= 1994–95 United States network television schedule =

Television schedule for the fall of 1994

The following is the 1994–95 network television schedule for the six major English language commercial broadcast networks in the United States. The schedule covers primetime hours from September 1994 through August 1995. The schedule is followed by a list per network of returning series, new series, and series cancelled after the 1993–94 season.

All times are Eastern and Pacific, with certain exceptions, such as Monday Night Football.

This was the first season in which the entirety of primetime network programming was presented in stereo sound.

Two new networks, the United Paramount Network and The WB Television Network, launched in January 1995. Both networks would ultimately shutdown and merge to form The CW in September 2006.

New series highlighted in bold.

Each of the 30 highest-rated shows is listed with its rank and rating in parentheses (#rank / rating), as determined by Nielsen Media Research.

Lime indicates the number-one watched program for the season.
Yellow indicates the programs in the top 10 for the season.
Cyan indicates the programs in the top 20 for the season.
Magenta indicates the programs in the top 30 for the season.

Other Legend

- Light blue indicates local programming.
- Gray indicates encore programming.
- Blue-gray indicates news programming.
- Light green indicates sporting events.
- Red indicates series being burned off and other irregularly scheduled programs, including specials and movies.
- Light gold indicates programming produced outside of the United States.
- Bronze indicates reairs of programming that originally aired on a cable channel.

PBS is not included; member stations have local flexibility over most of their schedules and broadcast times for network shows may vary.

== Sunday ==
| Network | | 7:00 PM | 7:30 PM | 8:00 PM | 8:30 PM | 9:00 PM | 9:30 PM | 10:00 PM | 10:30 PM |
|---|---|---|---|---|---|---|---|---|---|
| ABC | Fall | America's Funniest Home Videos | **On Our Own** | Lois & Clark: The New Adventures of Superman | | The ABC Sunday Night Movie (23/12.7) | | | |
| ABC | Winter | America's Funniest Home Videos | America's Funniest Home Videos (R) | Lois & Clark: The New Adventures of Superman | | The ABC Sunday Night Movie (23/12.7) | | | |
| ABC | Spring | America's Funniest Home Videos | America's Funniest Home Videos (R) | Lois & Clark: The New Adventures of Superman | | The ABC Sunday Night Movie (23/12.7) | | | |
| ABC | Summer | America's Funniest Home Videos | America's Funniest Home Videos (R) | Lois & Clark: The New Adventures of Superman | | The ABC Sunday Night Movie (23/12.7) | | | |
| CBS | Fall | 60 Minutes (6/17.2) | | Murder, She Wrote (8/15.6) (Tied with **Friends**) | | CBS Sunday Movie (18/13.7) | | | |
| CBS | Winter | 60 Minutes (6/17.2) | | Murder, She Wrote (8/15.6) (Tied with **Friends**) | | CBS Sunday Movie (18/13.7) | | | |
| CBS | Spring | 60 Minutes (6/17.2) | | Murder, She Wrote (8/15.6) (Tied with **Friends**) | | CBS Sunday Movie (18/13.7) | | | |
| CBS | Summer | 60 Minutes (6/17.2) | | **The Wright Verdicts** | | CBS Sunday Movie (18/13.7) | | | |
| CBS | Mid-summer | 60 Minutes (6/17.2) | | Murder, She Wrote (8/15.6) (Tied with **Friends**) | | CBS Sunday Movie (18/13.7) | | | |
| Fox | Fall | **Fortune Hunter** | | The Simpsons | **Hardball** | Married... with Children | **Wild Oats** | Local programming | |
| Fox | Mid-fall | Encounters: The Hidden Truth | | The Simpsons | The Simpsons (R) | Married... with Children | The George Carlin Show | Local programming | |
| Fox | Winter | The Simpsons (R) | **Get Smart** | The Simpsons | **House of Buggin'** | Married... with Children | Dream On (R) | Local programming | |
| Fox | Spring | Encounters: The Hidden Truth | | The Simpsons | The Critic | Married... with Children | Dream On (R) | Local programming | |
| Fox | Mid-spring | Special programming | | The Simpsons | The Critic | Married... with Children | Married... with Children (R) | Local programming | |
| Fox | Summer | **Sliders** (R) | | The Simpsons | The Critic | Married... with Children | **My Wildest Dreams** | Local programming | |
| Fox | Mid-summer | **Sliders** (R) | | The Simpsons | The Critic | Married... with Children | The George Carlin Show | Local programming | |
| Fox | Late summer | **Sliders** (R) | | The Simpsons | Living Single (R) | Married... with Children | The George Carlin Show | Local programming | |
| NBC | Fall | Unsolved Mysteries (R) | | seaQuest DSV | | NBC Sunday Night Movie (28/12.0) | | | |
| NBC | Mid-fall | **Earth 2** | | seaQuest DSV | | NBC Sunday Night Movie (28/12.0) | | | |
| NBC | Winter | **Earth 2** | | seaQuest DSV | | NBC Sunday Night Movie (28/12.0) | | | |
| NBC | Spring | **Earth 2** | | seaQuest DSV | | NBC Sunday Night Movie (28/12.0) | | | |
| NBC | Summer | **Time Life's Lost Civilizations** | | seaQuest DSV | | NBC Sunday Night Movie (28/12.0) | | | |

Notes: On FOX, The Great Defender aired its pilot episode on March 5, 1995 at 7pm, but was canceled by Fox before the second episode aired, with the remaining episodes already made before being cancelled were burned off on Mondays during the summer. House of Buggin' came back for three weeks in April on FOX; at 8:30PM ET on April 9th and April 16th and 9:30PM ET on April 23rd.

== Monday ==
| Network | | 8:00 PM | 8:30 PM | 9:00 PM | 9:30 PM | 10:00 PM | 10:30 PM |
|---|---|---|---|---|---|---|---|
| ABC | Fall | Coach | **Blue Skies** | ABC's Monday Night Football (5/17.7) | | | |
| ABC | Mid-fall | Coach | Coach (R) | ABC's Monday Night Football (5/17.7) | | | |
| ABC | Winter | Coach | **A Whole New Ballgame** | The ABC Monday Night Movie (29/11.7) (Tied with **Chicago Hope**, **The Martin Short Show** and Primetime Live) | | | |
| ABC | Spring | Special programming | | The ABC Monday Night Movie (29/11.7) (Tied with **Chicago Hope**, **The Martin Short Show** and Primetime Live) | | | |
| ABC | Summer | **The Marshal** (R) | | The ABC Monday Night Movie (29/11.7) (Tied with **Chicago Hope**, **The Martin Short Show** and Primetime Live) | | | |
| CBS | Fall | The Nanny (24/12.5) | Dave's World (21/12.9) | Murphy Brown (16/14.1) | Love & War | Northern Exposure | |
| CBS | Winter | The Nanny (24/12.5) | Dave's World (21/12.9) | Murphy Brown (16/14.1) | **Cybill** (22/12.8) | **Chicago Hope** (29/11.7) (Tied with The ABC Monday Night Movie, **The Martin Short Show** and Primetime Live) | |
| CBS | Spring | The Nanny (24/12.5) | Dave's World (21/12.9) | Murphy Brown (16/14.1) | **Cybill** (22/12.8) | **Chicago Hope** (29/11.7) (Tied with The ABC Monday Night Movie, **The Martin Short Show** and Primetime Live) | |
| CBS | Summer | The Nanny (24/12.5) | Dave's World (21/12.9) | Murphy Brown (16/14.1) | **Cybill** (22/12.8) | **Chicago Hope** (29/11.7) (Tied with The ABC Monday Night Movie, **The Martin Short Show** and Primetime Live) | |
| Fox | Fall | Melrose Place | | **Party of Five** | | Local programming | |
| Fox | Winter | Melrose Place | | Models Inc. | | Local programming | |
| Fox | Spring | Melrose Place | | **Medicine Ball** | | Local programming | |
| Fox | Summer | Models Inc. | | Dream On (R) | Dream On (R) | Local programming | |
| Fox | Mid-summer | Encounters: The Hidden Truth (R) | | **The Great Defender** | | Local programming | |
| Fox | Late summer | Encounters: The Hidden Truth (R) | | **New York Undercover** (R) | | Local programming | |
| NBC | Fall | The Fresh Prince of Bel-Air | Blossom | The NBC Monday Movie (19/13.6) | | | |
| NBC | Winter | The Fresh Prince of Bel-Air | Blossom | The NBC Monday Movie (19/13.6) | | | |
| NBC | Spring | The Fresh Prince of Bel-Air | **In the House** | The NBC Monday Movie (19/13.6) | | | |
| NBC | Summer | The Fresh Prince of Bel-Air | The Fresh Prince of Bel-Air (R) | The NBC Monday Movie (19/13.6) | | | |
| NBC | Mid-summer | The Fresh Prince of Bel-Air | **In the House** | The NBC Monday Movie (19/13.6) | | | |
| UPN (launched January 16, 1995) | Winter | **Star Trek: Voyager** | | **Platypus Man** | **Pig Sty** | Local programming | |
| UPN (launched January 16, 1995) | Spring | **Star Trek: Voyager** | | **Pig Sty** | **Platypus Man** | Local programming | |
| UPN (launched January 16, 1995) | Summer | **Star Trek: Voyager** | | **Legend** | | Local programming | |

(*) UPN premiered by airing the two-hour first episode of Star Trek: Voyager, with the network's Monday night comedies (Platypus Man and Pig Sty) debuting a week later.

== Tuesday ==
| Network | | 8:00 PM | 8:30 PM | 9:00 PM | 9:30 PM | 10:00 PM | 10:30 PM |
|---|---|---|---|---|---|---|---|
| ABC | Fall | Full House (25/12.4) | **Me and the Boys** (20/13.1) | Home Improvement (3/19.5) | Grace Under Fire (4/18.6) | NYPD Blue (7/16.5) | |
| ABC | Winter | Full House (25/12.4) | **Me and the Boys** (20/13.1) | Home Improvement (3/19.5) | Grace Under Fire (4/18.6) | NYPD Blue (7/16.5) | |
| ABC | Spring | Full House (25/12.4) | Thunder Alley | Home Improvement (3/19.5) | Ellen (R) | NYPD Blue (7/16.5) | |
| ABC | Summer | Full House (25/12.4) | Thunder Alley | Home Improvement (3/19.5) | Coach (R) | NYPD Blue (7/16.5) | |
| ABC | Late summer | Full House (25/12.4) | Roseanne (R) | Home Improvement (3/19.5) | Coach (R) | NYPD Blue (7/16.5) | |
| CBS | Fall | Rescue 911 | | CBS Tuesday Movie | | | |
| CBS | Winter | Rescue 911 | | CBS Tuesday Movie | | | |
| CBS | Spring | **Under One Roof** | | CBS Tuesday Movie | | | |
| CBS | Mid-spring | Rescue 911 | | CBS Tuesday Movie | | | |
| CBS | Summer | Rescue 911 | | CBS Tuesday Movie | | | |
| Fox | | Fox Tuesday Night Movie | | | | Local programming | |
| NBC | Fall | Wings (26/12.3) | **The Martin Short Show** (29/11.7) (Tied with **Chicago Hope**, The ABC Monday Night Movie and Primetime Live) | Frasier (15/14.3) | The John Larroquette Show | Dateline NBC | |
| NBC | Mid-fall | Wings (26/12.3) | Various programming | Frasier (15/14.3) | The John Larroquette Show | Dateline NBC | |
| NBC | Winter | Wings (26/12.3) | **Something Wilder** | Frasier (15/14.3) | The John Larroquette Show | Dateline NBC | |
| NBC | Spring | Wings (26/12.3) | **NewsRadio** | Frasier (15/14.3) | **Pride & Joy** | Dateline NBC | |
| NBC | Mid-spring | Wings (26/12.3) | **NewsRadio** | Frasier (15/14.3) | The John Larroquette Show | Dateline NBC | |
| NBC | Summer | Wings (26/12.3) | **Pride & Joy** | Frasier (15/14.3) | The John Larroquette Show | Dateline NBC | |
| NBC | Mid-summer | Wings (26/12.3) | **NewsRadio** | Frasier (15/14.3) | The John Larroquette Show | Dateline NBC | |
| UPN (launched January 17, 1995) | Winter | **Marker** | | **The Watcher** | | Local programming | |
| UPN (launched January 17, 1995) | Spring | **Legend** | | **Marker** | | Local programming | |
| UPN (launched January 17, 1995) | Summer | **Legend** | | **Marker** | | Local programming | |

== Wednesday ==
| Network | | 8:00 PM | 8:30 PM | 9:00 PM | 9:30 PM | 10:00 PM | 10:30 PM |
|---|---|---|---|---|---|---|---|
| ABC | Fall | Thunder Alley | **All-American Girl** | Roseanne (10/15.5) | Ellen (13/14.8) | Turning Point | |
| ABC | Mid-fall | Sister, Sister | **All-American Girl** | Roseanne (10/15.5) | Ellen (13/14.8) | Turning Point | |
| ABC | Winter | Sister, Sister | **All-American Girl** | Roseanne (10/15.5) | Ellen (13/14.8) | Primetime Live (29/11.7); Tied with **Chicago Hope**, The ABC Monday Night Movie and **The Martin Short Show**) | |
| ABC | Spring | Roseanne (10/15.5) | Ellen (13/14.8) | Grace Under Fire (4/18.6) | Coach | Primetime Live (29/11.7); Tied with **Chicago Hope**, The ABC Monday Night Movie and **The Martin Short Show**) | |
| ABC | Summer | **Me and the Boys** (R) | Ellen (13/14.8) | Grace Under Fire (4/18.6) | Roseanne (10/15.5) | Primetime Live (29/11.7); Tied with **Chicago Hope**, The ABC Monday Night Movie and **The Martin Short Show**) | |
| ABC | Late summer | Grace Under Fire (R) | Ellen (13/14.8) | Grace Under Fire (4/18.6) | **All-American Girl** | Primetime Live (29/11.7); Tied with **Chicago Hope**, The ABC Monday Night Movie and **The Martin Short Show**) | |
| CBS | Fall | **The Boys Are Back** | **Daddy's Girls** | **Touched by an Angel** | | 48 Hours | |
| CBS | Mid-fall | The Nanny (R) | **The Boys Are Back** | **Touched by an Angel** | | 48 Hours | |
| CBS | Winter | **Women of the House** | Hearts Afire | **Double Rush** | Love & War | Northern Exposure | |
| CBS | Spring | **The George Wendt Show** | **Double Rush** | CBS Wednesday Movie | | | |
| CBS | Mid-spring | Special programming | | CBS Wednesday Movie | | | |
| CBS | Summer | Christy | | **Under Suspicion** (R) | | **Under Suspicion** (R) | |
| CBS | Mid-summer | Christy | | Northern Exposure | | **Under Suspicion** (R) | |
| CBS | Late summer | The Nanny (R) | Dave's World (R) | CBS Wednesday Movie | | | |
| Fox | Fall | Beverly Hills, 90210 | | Models Inc. | | Local programming | |
| Fox | Winter | Beverly Hills, 90210 | | **Party of Five** | | Local programming | |
| Fox | Spring | Beverly Hills, 90210 | | **Sliders** | | Local programming | |
| Fox | Summer | Beverly Hills, 90210 | | **Party of Five** | | Local programming | |
| NBC | Fall | **The Cosby Mysteries** | | Dateline NBC | | Law & Order (27/12.2) | |
| NBC | Winter | **The Cosby Mysteries** | | Dateline NBC | | Law & Order (27/12.2) | |
| NBC | Spring | **The Cosby Mysteries** | | Dateline NBC | | Law & Order (27/12.2) | |
| NBC | Mid-spring | Special programming | | Dateline NBC | | Law & Order (27/12.2) | |
| NBC | Summer | **High Sierra Search and Rescue** | | Dateline NBC | | Law & Order (27/12.2) | |
| NBC | Late summer | Special programming | | Dateline NBC | | Law & Order (27/12.2) | |
| The WB (launched January 11, 1995) | Winter | **The Wayans Bros.** | **The Parent 'Hood** | **Unhappily Ever After** | **Muscle** | Local programming | |
| The WB (launched January 11, 1995) | Spring | **The Wayans Bros.** | **The Parent 'Hood** | **Unhappily Ever After** | **Muscle** | Local programming | |
| The WB (launched January 11, 1995) | Summer | **The Parent 'Hood** (R) | **The Parent 'Hood** | **The Wayans Bros.** | **Unhappily Ever After** | Local programming | |
| The WB (launched January 11, 1995) | Late summer | Sister, Sister (R) | **The Parent 'Hood** | **The Wayans Bros.** | **Unhappily Ever After** | Local programming | |

== Thursday ==
| Network | | 8:00 p.m. | 8:30 p.m. | 9:00 p.m. | 9:30 p.m. | 10:00 p.m. | 10:30 p.m. |
|---|---|---|---|---|---|---|---|
| ABC | Fall | **My So-Called Life** | | **McKenna** | | Primetime Live (29/11.7); Tied with **Chicago Hope**, The ABC Monday Night Movie and **The Martin Short Show**) | |
| ABC | Mid-fall | **My So-Called Life** | | Matlock | | Primetime Live (29/11.7); Tied with **Chicago Hope**, The ABC Monday Night Movie and **The Martin Short Show**) | |
| ABC | Winter | **My So-Called Life** | | Matlock | | Day One | |
| ABC | Mid-winter | Matlock | | The Commish | | Day One | |
| ABC | Late winter | **Extreme** | | The Commish | | Day One | |
| ABC | Spring | ABC Thursday Night Movie | | | | Day One | |
| ABC | Summer | Matlock | | The Commish | | Day One | |
| ABC | Mid-summer | Matlock | | **McKenna** | | Day One | |
| ABC | Late summer | Matlock | | The Commish | | Day One | |
| CBS | Fall | **Due South** | | **Chicago Hope** (29/11.7) (Tied with the ABC Monday Night Movie, **The Martin Short Show** and Primetime Live) | | Eye to Eye with Connie Chung | |
| CBS | Winter | **Due South** | | Eye to Eye with Connie Chung | | 48 Hours | |
| CBS | Spring | **Due South** | | Eye to Eye with Connie Chung | | 48 Hours | |
| CBS | Mid-spring | Special programming | | Eye to Eye with Connie Chung | | 48 Hours | |
| CBS | Summer | Burke's Law | | Eye to Eye with Connie Chung | | 48 Hours | |
| CBS | Late summer | Murder, She Wrote (R) | | Eye to Eye with Connie Chung | | 48 Hours | |
| Fox | Fall | Martin | Living Single | **New York Undercover** | | Local programming | |
| Fox | Winter | Martin | Living Single | **New York Undercover** | | Local programming | |
| Fox | Spring | Martin | Living Single | **New York Undercover** | | Local programming | |
| Fox | Summer | Living Single | Martin | **New York Undercover** | | Local programming | |
| NBC | Fall | Mad About You (11/15.2) | **Friends** (8/15.6) (Tied with Murder, She Wrote) | Seinfeld (1/20.6) | **Madman of the People** (12/14.9) | **ER** (2/20.0) | |
| NBC | Winter | Mad About You (11/15.2) | **Hope & Gloria** (14/14.6) | Seinfeld (1/20.6) | **Friends** (8/15.6) (Tied with Murder, She Wrote) | **ER** (2/20.0) | |
| NBC | Spring | Mad About You (11/15.2) | **Hope & Gloria** (14/14.6) | Seinfeld (1/20.6) | **Friends** (8/15.6) (Tied with Murder, She Wrote) | **ER** (2/20.0) | |
| NBC | Summer | Mad About You (11/15.2) | **Hope & Gloria** (14/14.6) | Seinfeld (1/20.6) | **Friends** (8/15.6) (Tied with Murder, She Wrote) | **ER** (2/20.0) | |
| NBC | Late summer | **Friends** (8/15.6) (Tied with Murder, She Wrote) | **Hope & Gloria** (14/14.6) | Seinfeld (1/20.6) | Mad About You (11/15.2) | **ER** (2/20.0) | |

== Friday ==
| Network | | 8:00 PM | 8:30 PM | 9:00 PM | 9:30 PM | 10:00 PM | 10:30 PM |
|---|---|---|---|---|---|---|---|
| ABC | Fall | Family Matters | Boy Meets World | Step by Step | Hangin' with Mr. Cooper | 20/20 (17/14.0) | |
| ABC | Winter | Family Matters | Boy Meets World | Step by Step | Hangin' with Mr. Cooper | 20/20 (17/14.0) | |
| ABC | Late winter | Family Matters | Boy Meets World | Step by Step | **On Our Own** | 20/20 (17/14.0) | |
| ABC | Spring | Family Matters | Sister, Sister | Step by Step | **On Our Own** | 20/20 (17/14.0) | |
| ABC | Mid-spring | Family Matters | Boy Meets World | Step by Step | Hangin' with Mr. Cooper | 20/20 (17/14.0) | |
| ABC | Summer | Family Matters | Boy Meets World | Step by Step | Hangin' with Mr. Cooper | 20/20 (17/14.0) | |
| CBS | Fall | Diagnosis: Murder | | **Under Suspicion** | | Picket Fences | |
| CBS | Winter | Diagnosis: Murder | | **Under Suspicion** | | Picket Fences | |
| CBS | Spring | Diagnosis: Murder | | **The Wright Verdicts** | | Picket Fences | |
| CBS | Mid-spring | Diagnosis: Murder | | Burke's Law | | Picket Fences | |
| CBS | Summer | Diagnosis: Murder | | **Due South** (R) | | Picket Fences | |
| CBS | Mid-summer | Diagnosis: Murder | | **Black Fox** | | | |
| CBS | Late summer | Diagnosis: Murder | | Picket Fences (R) | | Picket Fences | |
| Fox | Fall | **M.A.N.T.I.S.** | | The X-Files | | Local programming | |
| Fox | Winter | **M.A.N.T.I.S.** | | The X-Files | | Local programming | |
| Fox | Spring | **VR.5** | | The X-Files | | Local programming | |
| Fox | Summer | Encounters: The Hidden Truth (R) | | The X-Files | | Local programming | |
| Fox | Mid-summer | Tales from the Crypt (R) | Tales from the Crypt (R) | The X-Files | | Local programming | |
| Fox | Late summer | TV Nation | | The X-Files | | Local programming | |
| NBC | | Unsolved Mysteries | | Dateline NBC | | Homicide: Life on the Street | |

== Saturday ==
| Network | | 8:00 p.m. | 8:30 p.m. | 9:00 p.m. | 9:30 p.m. | 10:00 p.m. | 10:30 p.m. |
|---|---|---|---|---|---|---|---|
| ABC | Fall | **ABC Family Movie** | | | | The Commish | |
| ABC | Winter | **ABC Family Movie** | | | | **The Marshal** | |
| ABC | Spring | **ABC Family Movie** | | | | **The Marshal** | |
| ABC | Summer | **Me and the Boys** (R) | **Bringing up Jack** | ABC Saturday Night Movie | | | |
| ABC | Mid-summer | Special programming | | ABC Saturday Night Movie | | | |
| ABC | Late summer | Special programming | | | | | |
| CBS | Fall | Dr. Quinn, Medicine Woman | | **The 5 Mrs. Buchanans** | Hearts Afire | Walker, Texas Ranger | |
| CBS | Winter | Dr. Quinn, Medicine Woman | | **The Boys Are Back** | **The 5 Mrs. Buchanans** | Walker, Texas Ranger | |
| CBS | Late winter | Dr. Quinn, Medicine Woman | | **The Office** | **The 5 Mrs. Buchanans** | Walker, Texas Ranger | |
| CBS | Spring | Dr. Quinn, Medicine Woman | | **Touched by an Angel** | | Walker, Texas Ranger | |
| CBS | Summer | Dr. Quinn, Medicine Woman | | **Touched by an Angel** | | Walker, Texas Ranger | |
| Fox | | COPS | COPS (R) | America's Most Wanted | | Local programming | |
| NBC | Fall | **Something Wilder** | Empty Nest | **Sweet Justice** | | Sisters | |
| NBC | Mid-fall | NBC Saturday Night Movie | | | | Sisters | |
| NBC | Late fall | Empty Nest | Empty Nest | **Sweet Justice** | | Sisters | |
| NBC | Winter | Empty Nest | The Mommies | **Sweet Justice** | | Sisters | |
| NBC | Spring | **Amazing Grace** | | **Sweet Justice** | | Sisters | |
| NBC | Mid-spring | NBC Saturday Night Movie | | | | Special programming | |
| NBC | Summer | Empty Nest | The Mommies | The John Larroquette Show (R) | **Madman of the People** | Law & Order (R) | |
| NBC | Mid-summer | Empty Nest (R) | Empty Nest (R) | The John Larroquette Show (R) | The John Larroquette Show (R) | Law & Order (R) | |
| NBC | Late summer | Various programming | | | | | |

== By network ==
=== ABC ===
Returning series

- 20/20
- ABC's Monday Night Football
- The ABC Monday Night Movie
- ABC Saturday Night Movie
- The ABC Sunday Night Movie
- ABC Thursday Night Movie
- America's Funniest Home Videos
- Baseball Night in America
- Boy Meets World
- Coach
- The Commish
- Day One
- Ellen
- Family Matters
- Full House
- Grace Under Fire
- Hangin' with Mr. Cooper
- Home Improvement
- Lois & Clark: The New Adventures of Superman
- Matlock
- NYPD Blue
- Primetime Live
- Roseanne
- Sister, Sister
- Step by Step
- Thunder Alley
- Turning Point

New series

- **ABC Family Movie**
- **All-American Girl**
- **Blue Skies**
- **Bringing up Jack** *
- **Extreme** *
- **The Marshal** *
- **McKenna**
- **Me and the Boys**
- **My So-Called Life**
- **On Our Own**
- **A Whole New Ballgame** *

Not returning from 1993–94:

- America's Funniest People
- Birdland
- The Byrds of Paradise
- The Critic (moved to Fox)
- Dinosaurs
- FBI: The Untold Stories
- George
- Joe's Life
- Missing Persons
- Moon Over Miami
- The Paula Poundstone Show
- Phenom
- She TV
- Thea
- Where I Live

=== CBS ===
Returning series

- 48 Hours
- 60 Minutes
- Burke's Law
- CBS Sunday Movie
- Christy
- Dave's World
- Diagnosis: Murder
- Dr. Quinn, Medicine Woman
- Eye to Eye with Connie Chung
- Hearts Afire
- Love & War
- Muddling Through
- Murder, She Wrote
- Murphy Brown
- The Nanny
- Northern Exposure
- Picket Fences
- Rescue 911
- Walker, Texas Ranger

New series

- **The Boys Are Back**
- **Chicago Hope**
- **Cybill** *
- **Daddy's Girls**
- **Double Rush** *
- **Due South**
- **The 5 Mrs. Buchanans**
- **The George Wendt Show** *
- **The Office** *
- **Touched by an Angel**
- **Under One Roof** *
- **Under Suspicion**
- **Women of the House** *
- **The Wright Verdicts** *

Not returning from 1993–94:

- 704 Hauser
- America Tonight
- Angel Falls
- Family Album
- Good Advice
- Harts of the West
- Hotel Malibu
- It Had to Be You
- One West Waikiki
- The Road Home
- Second Chances
- South of Sunset
- Tom
- Traps

=== Fox ===
Returning series

- America's Most Wanted
- Beverly Hills, 90210
- Cops
- Dream On (Originally aired on HBO)
- The Critic (moved from ABC)
- Encounters: The Hidden Truth
- Fox Tuesday Night Movie
- The George Carlin Show
- Living Single
- Married... with Children
- Martin
- Melrose Place
- Models Inc.
- The Simpsons
- TV Nation (moved from NBC)
- The X-Files

New series

- **Fortune Hunter**
- **Get Smart** *
- **The Great Defender** *
- **Hardball**
- **House of Buggin'** *
- **M.A.N.T.I.S.**
- **Medicine Ball** *
- **My Wildest Dreams** *
- **New York Undercover**
- **Party of Five**
- **Sliders** *
- **VR.5** *
- **Wild Oats**

Not returning from 1993–94:

- The Adventures of Brisco County, Jr.
- Bakersfield P.D.
- Code 3
- Comic Strip Live
- Daddy Dearest
- The Front Page
- Herman's Head
- In Living Color
- Monty
- Roc
- The Sinbad Show
- South Central
- Townsend Television

=== NBC ===
Returning series

- Blossom
- Dateline NBC
- Empty Nest
- Frasier
- The Fresh Prince of Bel-Air
- Homicide: Life on the Street
- The John Larroquette Show
- Law & Order
- Mad About You
- The Mommies
- NBC Sunday Night Movie
- NBC's Saturday Movie Of The Week
- The NBC Monday Movie
- seaQuest DSV
- Seinfeld
- Sisters
- Unsolved Mysteries
- Wings

New series

- **Amazing Grace** *
- **The Cosby Mysteries**
- **Earth 2**
- **ER**
- **Friends**
- **High Sierra Search and Rescue** *
- **Hope & Gloria** *
- **In the House** *
- **Madman of the People**
- **The Martin Short Show**
- **NewsRadio**
- **Pride & Joy** *
- **Something Wilder**
- **Sweet Justice**
- **Time Life's Lost Civilizations** *

Not returning from 1993–94:

- Against the Grain
- Café Americain
- Getting By
- The Good Life
- I Witness Video
- L.A. Law
- Nurses
- Now with Tom Brokaw and Katie Couric
- Saved by the Bell: The College Years
- The Second Half
- Someone Like Me
- TV Nation (moved to Fox)
- Viper
- Winnetka Road

=== UPN ===
- **Legend**
- **Marker**
- **Pig Sty**
- **Platypus Man**
- **Star Trek: Voyager**
- **The Watcher**

=== The WB ===
- **Muscle**
- **The Parent 'Hood**
- **Unhappily Ever After**
- **The Wayans Bros.**

Note: The * indicates that the program was introduced in midseason.
