= 1995–96 United States network television schedule =

Television schedule for the fall of 1995

The 1995–96 network television schedule for the six major English language commercial broadcast networks in the United States covers the primetime hours from September 1995 to August 1996. The schedule is followed by a list per network of returning series, new series, and series canceled after the 1994–95 season.

PBS is not included; member stations have local flexibility over most of their schedules and broadcast times for network shows may vary.

Each of the 30 highest-rated shows released in May 1996 is listed with its rank and rating as determined by Nielsen Media Research.

The 1995–96 season marked the final time for the Prime Time Access Rule as it was permanently discontinued by the Federal Communications Commission on August 30, 1996.

This is the first fall season for The WB and UPN. The schedules of either network would not be constant until fall 1999, when the WB decided to air shows from Sunday through Friday and UPN would air Monday through Friday. This is also the first television season to officially end in the month of May.

New series highlighted in bold.

Repeat airings or same-day rebroadcasts are indicated by (R).

All times are U.S. Eastern and Pacific Time (except for some live sports or events). Subtract one hour for Central, Mountain, Alaska and Hawaii–Aleutian times.

All sporting events air live in all time zones in U.S. Eastern time, with local and/or late-night programming (including Fox affiliates during the 10 p.m. ET/PT hour) by affiliates after game completion.

== Legend ==
- Light blue indicates local programming.
- Gray indicates encore programming.
- Blue-gray indicates news programming.
- Light green indicates sporting events.
- Red indicates series being burned off and other irregularly scheduled programs, including specials and movies.
- Light gold indicates programming produced outside of the United States.
- highlight Yellow highlights indicates the top-10 most watched programs of the season.
- highlight Cyan highlights indicates numbers 11-20 most watched programs of the season.
- highlight Magenta highlights indicates numbers 21-30 most watched programs of the season.
- highlight Highlights indicates that it falls in multiple of the above categories.

== Sunday ==
Network		7:00 p.m.	7:30 p.m.	8:00 p.m.	8:30 p.m.	9:00 p.m.	9:30 p.m.	10:00 p.m.	10:30 p.m.
ABC	Fall	America's Funniest Home Videos		Lois & Clark: The New Adventures of Superman		The ABC Sunday Night Movie			
ABC	Summer	**Muppets Tonight**	America's Funniest Home Videos	Lois & Clark: The New Adventures of Superman		The ABC Sunday Night Movie			
CBS	Fall	60 Minutes (9/14.2)		Cybill	**Almost Perfect**	CBS Sunday Movie (24/11.4) (Tied with Law & Order, The Naked Truth and Can't Hurry Love)			
CBS	Winter	60 Minutes (9/14.2)		Cybill	**Bonnie**	CBS Sunday Movie (24/11.4) (Tied with Law & Order, The Naked Truth and Can't Hurry Love)			
CBS	Spring	60 Minutes (9/14.2)		Murder, She Wrote		CBS Sunday Movie (24/11.4) (Tied with Law & Order, The Naked Truth and Can't Hurry Love)			
CBS	Summer	60 Minutes (9/14.2)		Touched By An Angel (R)		CBS Sunday Movie (24/11.4) (Tied with Law & Order, The Naked Truth and Can't Hurry Love)			
Fox	Fall	**Space: Above and Beyond**		The Simpsons	**Too Something**	Married... with Children	**Misery Loves Company**	Local programming	
Fox	Late fall	**Space: Above and Beyond**		The Simpsons	Martin	Married... with Children	**What's So Funny?**	Local programming	
Fox	Winter	**Space: Above and Beyond**		The Simpsons	**The Show**	Married... with Children	**Local Heroes**	Local programming	
Fox	Spring	Special programming		The Simpsons	The Simpsons (R)	Married... with Children	Married... with Children (R)	Local programming	
Fox	Summer	Special programming		The Simpsons	**New York Daze**	Married... with Children	**The Crew**	Local programming	
Fox	Mid-summer	Party of Five (R)		The Simpsons	Married... with Children	New York Undercover (R)		Local programming	
NBC	Fall	**Brotherly Love**	**Minor Adjustments**	Mad About You	Hope & Gloria	NBC Sunday Night Movie (21/12.2)			
NBC	Late fall	Special programming		Mad About You	NewsRadio	NBC Sunday Night Movie (21/12.2)			
NBC	Winter	Dateline NBC		Mad About You	NewsRadio	NBC Sunday Night Movie (21/12.2)			
NBC	Summer	Dateline NBC		**3rd Rock from the Sun** (R)	**Boston Common** (8/15.6)	NBC Sunday Night Movie (21/12.2)			
The WB	Early fall	**Pinky and the Brain**	Sister, Sister (R)	**Kirk**	**Simon**	**Cleghorne!**	**First Time Out**	Local programming	
The WB	Fall	**Pinky and the Brain**	**Kirk**	Sister, Sister (R)	**Cleghorne!**	**First Time Out**	**Simon**	Local programming	
The WB	Winter	**Pinky and the Brain**	**Simon**	Sister, Sister (R)	**Kirk**	**Savannah**		Local programming	
The WB	Late winter	**Pinky and the Brain**	The Parent 'Hood (R)	Sister, Sister (R)	**Kirk**	**Savannah**		Local programming	
The WB	Summer	**Kirk**	**Brotherly Love** (R)	The Parent 'Hood (R)	Sister, Sister (R)	Unhappily Ever After (R)	The Parent 'Hood (R)	Local programming	

== Monday ==
Network		8:00 p.m.	8:30 p.m.	9:00 p.m.	9:30 p.m.	10:00 p.m.	10:30 p.m.
ABC	Fall	The Marshal		Monday Night Football (5/17.1)			
ABC	Winter	The ABC Monday Night Movie				**Murder One**	
ABC	Mid-winter	**Second Noah**		Special programming		**Murder One**	
ABC	Spring	**Second Noah**		**High Incident**		**Murder One**	
ABC	Summer	The Marshal		The ABC Monday Night Movie			
CBS	Fall	The Nanny (16/12.5) (Tied with Roseanne)	**Can't Hurry Love** (24/11.4) (Tied with Law & Order, the CBS Sunday Movie and The Naked Truth)	Murphy Brown (18/12.3) (Tied with Walker, Texas Ranger and Primetime Live)	**If Not for You**	Chicago Hope (23/11.9)	
CBS	Mid-fall	The Nanny (16/12.5) (Tied with Roseanne)	**Can't Hurry Love** (24/11.4) (Tied with Law & Order, the CBS Sunday Movie and The Naked Truth)	Murphy Brown (18/12.3) (Tied with Walker, Texas Ranger and Primetime Live)	**High Society**	Chicago Hope (23/11.9)	
CBS	Late winter	The Nanny (16/12.5) (Tied with Roseanne)	**Almost Perfect**	Murphy Brown (18/12.3) (Tied with Walker, Texas Ranger and Primetime Live)	**Good Company**	Chicago Hope (23/11.9)	
CBS	Spring	The Nanny (16/12.5) (Tied with Roseanne)	Dave's World	Murphy Brown (18/12.3) (Tied with Walker, Texas Ranger and Primetime Live)	Cybill (R)	Chicago Hope (23/11.9)	
CBS	Summer	The Nanny (16/12.5) (Tied with Roseanne)	**Almost Perfect** (R)	Murphy Brown (18/12.3) (Tied with Walker, Texas Ranger and Primetime Live)	Cybill (R)	Chicago Hope (23/11.9)	
Fox	Fall	Melrose Place		**Partners**	**Ned and Stacey**	Local programming	
Fox	Winter	Melrose Place		**Ned and Stacey**	**Partners**	Local programming	
Fox	Spring	Melrose Place		**Profit**		Local programming	
Fox	Late spring	**Ned and Stacey** (R)	**The Last Frontier**	**L.A. Firefighters**		Local programming	
Fox	Summer	Fox Movie Special				Local programming	
NBC	Fall	The Fresh Prince of Bel-Air	In the House	The NBC Monday Movie (14/12.9) (Tied with Coach)			
NBC	Winter	The Fresh Prince of Bel-Air	**Brotherly Love**	The NBC Monday Movie (14/12.9) (Tied with Coach)			
NBC	Spring	The Fresh Prince of Bel-Air	In the House	The NBC Monday Movie (14/12.9) (Tied with Coach)			
NBC	Summer	The Fresh Prince of Bel-Air	The Fresh Prince of Bel-Air	The NBC Monday Movie (14/12.9) (Tied with Coach)			
UPN	Fall	Star Trek: Voyager		**Nowhere Man**		Local programming	
UPN	Winter	Star Trek: Voyager		**Nowhere Man**		Local programming	
UPN	Spring	Star Trek: Voyager		**Nowhere Man**		Local programming	
UPN	Summer	In the House (R)		**Nowhere Man**		Local programming	

== Tuesday ==
Network		8:00 p.m.	8:30 p.m.	9:00 p.m.	9:30 p.m.	10:00 p.m.	10:30 p.m.
ABC	Fall	Roseanne (16/12.5) (Tied with The Nanny)	**Hudson Street**	Home Improvement (7/16.1)	Coach (14/12.9) (Tied with the NBC Monday Movie)	NYPD Blue (10/14.1)	
ABC	Winter	Roseanne (16/12.5) (Tied with The Nanny)	Coach (14/12.9) (Tied with the NBC Monday Movie)	Home Improvement (7/16.1)	**Champs**	NYPD Blue (10/14.1)	
ABC	Mid-winter	Roseanne (16/12.5) (Tied with The Nanny)	Coach (14/12.9) (Tied with the NBC Monday Movie)	Home Improvement (7/16.1)	Various programming	NYPD Blue (10/14.1)	
ABC	Late winter	Roseanne (16/12.5) (Tied with The Nanny)	Coach (14/12.9) (Tied with the NBC Monday Movie)	Home Improvement (7/16.1)	**The Dana Carvey Show** (30/11.2)	NYPD Blue (10/14.1)	
ABC	Spring	Roseanne (16/12.5) (Tied with The Nanny)	**The Drew Carey Show** (R)	Home Improvement (7/16.1)	Coach (R)	NYPD Blue (10/14.1)	
CBS	Fall	**The Client**		CBS Tuesday Movie			
CBS	Summer	Rescue 911 (R)		CBS Tuesday Movie			
Fox		Fox Tuesday Night Movie				Local programming	
NBC	Fall	Wings	NewsRadio	Frasier (11/13.6) (Tied with 20/20)	**The Pursuit of Happiness**	Dateline NBC (28/11.3)	
NBC	Late fall	Wings	NewsRadio	Frasier (11/13.6) (Tied with 20/20)	The John Larroquette Show	Dateline NBC (28/11.3)	
NBC	Winter	Wings	**3rd Rock from the Sun** (22/12.1)	Frasier (11/13.6) (Tied with 20/20)	The John Larroquette Show	Dateline NBC (28/11.3)	
NBC	Spring	**3rd Rock from the Sun** (22/12.1)	Wings	Frasier (11/13.6) (Tied with 20/20)	The John Larroquette Show	Dateline NBC (28/11.3)	
NBC	Late spring	**3rd Rock from the Sun** (22/12.1)	NewsRadio (R)	Frasier (11/13.6) (Tied with 20/20)	Wings (R)	Dateline NBC (28/11.3)	
NBC	Summer	Mad About You (R)	NewsRadio (R)	Frasier (11/13.6) (Tied with 20/20)	**Caroline in the City** (R)	Dateline NBC (28/11.3)	
UPN	Fall	**Deadly Games**		**Live Shot**		Local programming	
UPN	Winter	**Moesha**	**Minor Adjustments**	Special programming		Local programming	
UPN	Spring	**Moesha**	**Minor Adjustments**	**The Paranormal Borderline**		Local programming	

== Wednesday ==
Network		8:00 PM	8:30 PM	9:00 PM	9:30 PM	10:00 PM	10:30 PM
ABC	Fall	Ellen	**The Drew Carey Show**	Grace Under Fire (13/13.2)	**The Naked Truth** (24/11.4) (Tied with Law & Order, the CBS Sunday Movie and Can't Hurry Love)	Primetime Live (18/12.3) (Tied with Walker, Texas Ranger and Murphy Brown)	
ABC	Winter	Ellen	**The Faculty**	Grace Under Fire (13/13.2)	**Buddies**	Primetime Live (18/12.3) (Tied with Walker, Texas Ranger and Murphy Brown)	
ABC	Spring	Ellen	**The Drew Carey Show** (R)	Grace Under Fire (13/13.2)	**The Faculty**	Primetime Live (18/12.3) (Tied with Walker, Texas Ranger and Murphy Brown)	
ABC	Late spring	Ellen	**Hudson Street**	Grace Under Fire (13/13.2)	**The Faculty**	Primetime Live (18/12.3) (Tied with Walker, Texas Ranger and Murphy Brown)	
ABC	Summer	Ellen	**The Faculty** (R)	Grace Under Fire (13/13.2)	**Champs**	Primetime Live (18/12.3) (Tied with Walker, Texas Ranger and Murphy Brown)	
ABC	Mid-summer	Ellen	**The Faculty** (R)	Grace Under Fire (13/13.2)	**The Drew Carey Show** (R)	Primetime Live (18/12.3) (Tied with Walker, Texas Ranger and Murphy Brown)	
CBS	Fall	**Bless This House**	Dave's World	**Central Park West**		**Courthouse**	
CBS	Late fall	Dave's World	**Bless This House**	Special programming			
CBS	Winter	Dave's World	**Bless This House**	**Matt Waters**		**American Gothic**	
CBS	Mid-winter	Dave's World	**The Louie Show**	CBS Wednesday Movie			
CBS	Spring	Dave's World	**My Guys**	CBS Wednesday Movie			
CBS	Mid-spring	Special programming		CBS Wednesday Movie			
CBS	Late spring	Special programming		Picket Fences		**Central Park West**	
CBS	Summer	Dave's World (R)	**Can't Hurry Love** (R)	**American Gothic**			
CBS	Mid-summer	The Nanny (R)	Dave's World (R)	Various programming			
Fox	Fall	Beverly Hills, 90210		Party of Five		Local programming	
Fox	Spring	Beverly Hills, 90210		**Kindred: The Embraced**		Local programming	
Fox	Late spring	Beverly Hills, 90210		Party of Five (R)		Local programming	
NBC	Fall	seaQuest 2032		Dateline NBC (28/11.3)		Law & Order (24/11.4) (Tied with the CBS Sunday Movie, The Naked Truth and Can't Hurry Love)	
NBC	Winter	Special programming		Dateline NBC (28/11.3)		Law & Order (24/11.4) (Tied with the CBS Sunday Movie, The Naked Truth and Can't Hurry Love)	
NBC	Late winter	**JAG**		Dateline NBC (28/11.3)		Law & Order (24/11.4) (Tied with the CBS Sunday Movie, The Naked Truth and Can't Hurry Love)	
NBC	Summer	Wings (R)	The John Larroquette Show (R)	Dateline NBC (28/11.3)		Law & Order (24/11.4) (Tied with the CBS Sunday Movie, The Naked Truth and Can't Hurry Love)	
UPN	Spring (Starting in mid-March)	**The Sentinel**		**Swift Justice**		Local programming	
UPN	Summer	**The Sentinel**		Star Trek: Voyager (R)		Local programming	
The WB		Sister, Sister	The Parent 'Hood	The Wayans Bros.	Unhappily Ever After	Local programming	

== Thursday ==
Network		8:00 p.m.	8:30 p.m.	9:00 p.m.	9:30 p.m.	10:00 p.m.	10:30 p.m.
ABC	Fall	**Charlie Grace**		**The Monroes**		**Murder One**	
ABC	Mid-fall	The ABC Thursday Night Movie				**Murder One**	
ABC	Winter	Special programming					
ABC	Mid-winter	**World's Funniest Videos**	**Before They Were Stars**	The ABC Thursday Night Movie			
ABC	Summer	**High Incident**		The ABC Thursday Night Movie			
CBS	Fall	Murder, She Wrote		**New York News**		48 Hours	
CBS	Late fall	Murder, She Wrote		Various programming		48 Hours	
CBS	Winter	Murder, She Wrote		Rescue 911		48 Hours	
CBS	Summer	CBS Thursday Night Movie				48 Hours	
Fox	Fall	Living Single	**The Crew**	New York Undercover		Local programming	
Fox	Winter	Living Single	Martin	New York Undercover		Local programming	
Fox	Spring	Martin (R)	**The Show**	New York Undercover		Local programming	
Fox	Late spring	Martin (R)	Living Single (R)	New York Undercover		Local programming	
NBC	Fall	Friends (3/18.7)	**The Single Guy** (6/16.7)	Seinfeld (2/21.2)	**Caroline in the City** (4/18.0)	ER (1/22.0)	
NBC	Spring	Friends (3/18.7)	**Boston Common** (8/15.6)	Seinfeld (2/21.2)	**Caroline in the City** (4/18.0)	ER (1/22.0)	
NBC	Mid-spring	Friends (3/18.7)	**The Single Guy** (6/16.7)	Seinfeld (2/21.2)	**Caroline in the City** (4/18.0)	ER (1/22.0)	

== Friday ==
Network		8:00 p.m.	8:30 p.m.	9:00 p.m.	9:30 p.m.	10:00 p.m.	10:30 p.m.
ABC	Fall	Family Matters	Boy Meets World	Step by Step	Hangin' with Mr. Cooper	20/20 (11/13.6) (Tied with Frasier)	
ABC	Late Winter	Family Matters	**Muppets Tonight**	Step by Step	Hangin' with Mr. Cooper	20/20 (11/13.6) (Tied with Frasier)	
ABC	Spring	Family Matters	Boy Meets World	Step by Step	Hangin' with Mr. Cooper	20/20 (11/13.6) (Tied with Frasier)	
CBS	Fall	**Dweebs**	**The Bonnie Hunt Show**	Picket Fences		**American Gothic**	
CBS	Mid-fall	Due South		Diagnosis: Murder		Picket Fences	
CBS	Spring	Due South		Diagnosis: Murder		**Nash Bridges**	
CBS	Late spring	Due South		Diagnosis: Murder		**Central Park West**	
CBS	Summer	Due South		Diagnosis: Murder		**Nash Bridges**	
Fox	Fall	**Strange Luck**		The X-Files		Local programming	
Fox	Winter	Sliders		The X-Files		Local programming	
NBC		Unsolved Mysteries		Dateline NBC		Homicide: Life on the Street	

== Saturday ==
Network		8:00 p.m.	8:30 p.m.	9:00 p.m.	9:30 p.m.	10:00 p.m.	10:30 p.m.
ABC	Fall	**The Jeff Foxworthy Show**	**Maybe This Time**	ABC Saturday Night at the Movies			
ABC	Winter	**Hudson Street**	**Maybe This Time**	ABC Saturday Night at the Movies			
ABC	Late winter	Special programming					
ABC	Spring	**Second Noah** (R)		ABC Saturday Night at the Movies			
CBS		Dr. Quinn, Medicine Woman		Touched by an Angel		Walker, Texas Ranger (18/12.3) (Tied with Primetime Live and Murphy Brown)	
Fox	Fall	Martin	**The Preston Episodes**	COPS	America's Most Wanted	Local programming	
Fox	Late fall	COPS	COPS (R)	America's Most Wanted		Local programming	
NBC	Fall	**JAG**		The John Larroquette Show	**The Home Court**	Sisters	
NBC	Winter	**JAG**		Hope & Gloria	**The Home Court**	Sisters	
NBC	Late winter	**Malibu Shores**		Hope & Gloria	**The Home Court**	Sisters	
NBC	Spring	Special programming					
NBC	Summer	Various programming		NBC's Saturday Movie Of The Week			

Note: JAG was on Saturdays until February 3, 1996; then, on March 13, 1996, NBC moved the show to Wednesdays.

== By network ==
=== ABC ===
Returning series

- 20/20
- The ABC Monday Night Movie
- The ABC Sunday Night Movie
- ABC Saturday Night at the Movies
- The ABC Thursday Night Movie
- America's Funniest Home Videos
- Boy Meets World
- Coach
- The Commish
- Ellen
- Family Matters
- Grace Under Fire
- Hangin' with Mr. Cooper
- Home Improvement
- Lois & Clark: The New Adventures of Superman
- The Marshal
- Monday Night Football
- NYPD Blue
- Primetime Live
- Roseanne
- Step by Step
- Turning Point

New series

- **Aliens in the Family** *
- **Before They Were Stars** *
- **Buddies** *
- **Champs** *
- **Charlie Grace**
- **The Dana Carvey Show** *
- **The Drew Carey Show**
- **The Faculty** *
- **High Incident** *
- **Hudson Street**
- **The Jeff Foxworthy Show**
- **Maybe This Time**
- **The Monroes**
- **Muppets Tonight** *
- **Murder One**
- **The Naked Truth**
- **Second Noah** *
- **World's Funniest Videos** *

Not returning from 1994–95:

- ABC Family Movie
- All-American Girl
- Baseball Night in America
- Blue Skies
- Bringing up Jack
- Day One
- Extreme
- Full House
- Matlock
- McKenna
- Me and the Boys
- My So-Called Life
- On Our Own
- Sister, Sister (moved to The WB)
- Thunder Alley
- A Whole New Ballgame

=== CBS ===
Returning series

- 48 Hours
- 60 Minutes
- CBS Sunday Movie
- Chicago Hope
- Cybill
- Dave's World
- Diagnosis: Murder
- Dr. Quinn, Medicine Woman
- Due South
- Murder, She Wrote
- Murphy Brown
- The Nanny
- Picket Fences
- Rescue 911
- Touched by an Angel
- Walker, Texas Ranger

New series

- **Almost Perfect**
- **American Gothic**
- **Bless This House**
- **The Bonnie Hunt Show**
- **Can't Hurry Love**
- **Central Park West**
- **The Client**
- **Courthouse**
- **Dweebs**
- **Good Company** *
- **High Society** *
- **The Louie Show** *
- **Matt Waters** *
- **My Guys** *
- **Nash Bridges**
- **New York News**

Not returning from 1994–95:

- The Boys Are Back
- Burke's Law
- Christy
- Daddy's Girls
- Double Rush
- Eye to Eye with Connie Chung
- The 5 Mrs. Buchanans
- The George Wendt Show
- Hearts Afire
- Love & War
- Muddling Through
- Northern Exposure
- The Office
- Under One Roof
- Under Suspicion
- Women of the House
- The Wright Verdicts

=== Fox ===
Returning series

- America's Most Wanted
- Beverly Hills, 90210
- Cops
- Encounters: The Hidden Truth
- Fox Tuesday Night Movie
- Living Single
- Married... with Children
- Martin
- Melrose Place
- New York Undercover
- Party of Five
- The Simpsons
- Sliders
- The X-Files

New series

- **The Crew**
- **Kindred: The Embraced** *
- **L.A. Firefighters** *
- **The Last Frontier** *
- **Local Heroes** *
- **Misery Loves Company**
- **MADtv**
- **Ned and Stacey**
- **Partners**
- **The Preston Episodes**
- **Profit** *
- **The Show** *
- **Saturday Night Special**
- **Space: Above and Beyond**
- **Strange Luck**
- **Too Something**
- **What's So Funny?** *

Not returning from 1994–95:

- The Critic
- Dream On
- Fortune Hunter
- Get Smart
- The George Carlin Show
- The Great Defender
- Hardball
- House of Buggin'
- M.A.N.T.I.S.
- Medicine Ball
- Models Inc.
- My Wildest Dreams
- TV Nation
- VR.5
- Wild Oats

=== NBC ===
Returning series

- Dateline NBC
- ER
- Frasier
- The Fresh Prince of Bel-Air
- Friends
- Homicide: Life on the Street
- Hope & Gloria
- In the House
- The John Larroquette Show
- Law & Order
- Mad About You
- NBC Sunday Night Movie
- NBC's Saturday Movie Of The Week
- The NBC Monday Movie
- NewsRadio
- seaQuest 2032 (formerly known as seaQuest DSV)
- Seinfeld
- Sisters
- Unsolved Mysteries
- Wings

New series

- **3rd Rock from the Sun** *
- **Boston Common** *
- **Brotherly Love**
- **Caroline in the City**
- **The Home Court**
- **JAG**
- **Malibu Shores** *
- **Minor Adjustments** (moved to UPN)
- **The Pursuit of Happiness**
- **The Single Guy** *

Not returning from 1994–95:

- Amazing Grace
- Blossom
- The Cosby Mysteries
- Earth 2
- Empty Nest
- High Sierra Search and Rescue
- Madman of the People
- The Martin Short Show
- The Mommies
- Pride & Joy
- Something Wilder
- Sweet Justice
- Time Life's Lost Civilizations

=== UPN ===
Returning series

- Star Trek: Voyager

New series

- **Deadly Games**
- **Live Shot**
- **Minor Adjustments** (moved from NBC)
- **Moesha** *
- **Nowhere Man**
- **The Paranormal Borderline** *
- **The Sentinel** *
- **Swift Justice** *

Not returning from 1994–95:

- Legend
- Marker
- Pig Sty
- Platypus Man
- The Watcher

=== The WB ===
Returning series

- The Parent 'Hood
- Sister, Sister (moved from ABC)
- Unhappily Ever After
- The Wayans Bros.

New series

- **Cleghorne!**
- **First Time Out**
- **Kirk**
- **Pinky and the Brain**
- **Savannah** *
- **Simon**

Not returning from 1994–95:

- Muscle

Note: The * indicates that the program was introduced in midseason.
