= 1993–94 United States network television schedule =

Television schedule for the fall of 1993

The 1993–94 network television schedule for the four major English language commercial broadcast networks in the United States covers the primetime hours from September 1993 through August 1994. The schedule is followed by a list per network of returning series, new series, and series cancelled after the 1992–93 season.

PBS is not included; member stations have local flexibility over most of their schedules and broadcasts times for network shows may vary.

Each of the 30 highest-rated shows released in May 1994 is listed with its rank and rating as determined by Nielsen Media Research.

This is the first season in which Fox commenced television broadcasts on every night of the week from the beginning of the season onward.

New series are highlighted in bold.

Repeat airings or same-day rebroadcasts are indicated by (R).

All times are U.S. Eastern and Pacific Time (except for some live sports or events). Subtract one hour for Central, Mountain, Alaska and Hawaii–Aleutian times.

All sporting events air live in all time zones in U.S. Eastern time, with local and/or late-night programming scheduled by affiliates after game completion.

Note: From February 12 to 27, 1994, all of CBS' primetime programming was preempted in favor of coverage of the 1994 Winter Olympics in Lillehammer.

== Legend ==
- Light blue indicates local programming.
- Gray indicates encore programming.
- Blue-gray indicates news programming.
- Light green indicates sporting events.
- Red indicates series being burned off and other irregularly scheduled programs, including specials and movies.
- Light gold indicates programming produced outside of the United States.
- highlight Yellow highlights indicates the top-10 most watched programs of the season.
- highlight Cyan highlights indicates numbers 11-20 most watched programs of the season.
- highlight Magenta highlights indicates numbers 21-30 most watched programs of the season.
- highlight Highlights indicates that it falls in multiple of the above categories.

== Sunday ==
Network		7:00 p.m.	7:30 p.m.	8:00 p.m.	8:30 p.m.	9:00 p.m.	9:30 p.m.	10:00 p.m.	10:30 p.m.
ABC		America's Funniest Home Videos	The New America's Funniest People	**Lois & Clark: The New Adventures of Superman**		The ABC Sunday Night Movie (30/12.6) (Tied with Family Matters)			
CBS		60 Minutes (1/20.9)		Murder, She Wrote (11/16.0)		CBS Sunday Movie (10/16.2)			
Fox	Fall	**Townsend Television**		Martin	**Living Single**	Married... with Children	**Daddy Dearest**	Local programming	
Fox	Late fall	**Townsend Television**		Martin	**Living Single**	Married... with Children	Married... with Children (R)	Local programming	
Fox	Winter	Code 3 (R)		Martin	**Living Single**	Married... with Children	**The George Carlin Show**	Local programming	
Fox	Spring	Special programming		Martin	**Living Single**	Married... with Children	**The George Carlin Show**	Local programming	
Fox	Summer	**The Adventures of Brisco County, Jr.**		Martin	**Living Single**	Married... with Children	**The George Carlin Show**	Local programming	
Fox	Mid-summer	**The Adventures of Brisco County, Jr.**		The Simpsons (R)		Married... with Children	**The George Carlin Show**	Local programming	
NBC	Fall	I Witness Video		**seaQuest DSV**		NBC Sunday Night Movie			
NBC	Spring	NBA on NBC		**seaQuest DSV**		NBC Sunday Night Movie			
NBC	Summer	Special programming		**seaQuest DSV**		NBC Sunday Night Movie			

== Monday ==
Network		8:00 p.m.	8:30 p.m.	9:00 p.m.	9:30 p.m.	10:00 p.m.	10:30 p.m.
ABC	Fall	Day One		ABC's Monday Night Football (8/16.5)			
ABC	Winter	Day One		The ABC Monday Night Movie			
ABC	Summer	Coach (R)		Various programming			
CBS	Fall	Evening Shade (27/13.2) (Tied with Phenom and Rescue 911)	**Dave's World** (21/13.7) (Tied with The Fresh Prince of Bel-Air)	Murphy Brown (9/16.3)	Love & War (13/14.5)	Northern Exposure (14/14.4)	
CBS	Spring	**Dave's World** (21/13.7) (Tied with The Fresh Prince of Bel-Air)	**704 Hauser**	Murphy Brown (9/16.3)	Hearts Afire	Northern Exposure (14/14.4)	
CBS	Mid-spring	Evening Shade (27/13.2) (Tied with Phenom and Rescue 911)	Various programming	Murphy Brown (9/16.3)	Hearts Afire	Northern Exposure (14/14.4)	
CBS	Late spring	**Dave's World** (R)	**The Nanny** (R)	Murphy Brown (9/16.3)	Love & War (R)	Northern Exposure (14/14.4)	
CBS	Summer	**The Nanny** (R)	**Dave's World** (R)	Murphy Brown (9/16.3)	Love & War (R)	Northern Exposure (14/14.4)	
Fox		Fox Night at the Movies				Local programming	
NBC	Fall	The Fresh Prince of Bel-Air (21/13.7) (Tied with Dave's World)	Blossom	The NBC Monday Movie (23/13.6)			
NBC	Winter	The Fresh Prince of Bel-Air (21/13.7) (Tied with Dave's World)	**Someone Like Me**	The NBC Monday Movie (23/13.6)			
NBC	Spring	The Fresh Prince of Bel-Air (21/13.7) (Tied with Dave's World)	Blossom	The NBC Monday Movie (23/13.6)			

== Tuesday ==
Network		8:00 p.m.	8:30 p.m.	9:00 p.m.	9:30 p.m.	10:00 p.m.	10:30 p.m.
ABC	Fall	Full House (16/14.2)	**Phenom** (27/13.2) (Tied with Evening Shade and Rescue 911)	Roseanne (4/19.1)	Coach (6/17.4)	**NYPD Blue** (18/13.9) (Tied with Wings)	
ABC	Summer	Full House (16/14.2)	**Sister, Sister**	Roseanne (4/19.1)	Coach (6/17.4)	**NYPD Blue** (18/13.9) (Tied with Wings)	
ABC	Mid-summer	Full House (16/14.2)	**Sister, Sister**	Roseanne (4/19.1)	**These Friends of Mine**	**She TV**	
CBS		Rescue 911 (27/13.2) (Tied with Phenom and Evening Shade)		CBS Tuesday Movie (25/13.3) (Tied with Dr. Quinn, Medicine Woman)			
Fox	Fall	Roc	**Bakersfield P.D.**	America's Most Wanted		Local programming	
Fox	Winter	**Monty**	Roc	Front Page		Local programming	
Fox	Spring	**South Central**	Roc	Front Page		Local programming	
Fox	Mid-spring	**South Central**	Roc	Tales from the Crypt (R)		Local programming	
NBC	Fall	**Saved by the Bell: The College Years**	Getting By	**The John Larroquette Show**	**The Second Half**	Dateline NBC	
NBC	Winter	**Saved by the Bell: The College Years**	**The Good Life**	**The John Larroquette Show**	**Café Americain**	Dateline NBC	
NBC	Late winter	**The Good Life**	**The Second Half**	**The John Larroquette Show**	**The John Larroquette Show** (R)	Dateline NBC	
NBC	Spring	Special programming				Dateline NBC	
NBC	Summer	**TV Nation**		**The John Larroquette Show** (R)	Wings (R)	Dateline NBC	

== Wednesday ==
Network		8:00 p.m.	8:30 p.m.	9:00 p.m.	9:30 p.m.	10:00 p.m.	10:30 p.m.
ABC	Fall	**Thea**	**Joe's Life**	Home Improvement (2/20.4)	**Grace Under Fire** (5/17.7)	**Moon Over Miami**	
ABC	Late fall	**Thea**	**George**	Home Improvement (2/20.4)	**Grace Under Fire** (5/17.7)	Special programming	
ABC	Winter	**Thea**	**George**	Home Improvement (2/20.4)	**Grace Under Fire** (5/17.7)	**Birdland**	
ABC	Mid-winter	**Thea**	**The Critic**	Home Improvement (2/20.4)	**Grace Under Fire** (5/17.7)	**Birdland**	
ABC	Spring	Home Improvement (R)	**Thunder Alley** (12/15.9)	Home Improvement (2/20.4)	**These Friends of Mine**	**Turning Point** (20/13.8)	
ABC	Late Spring	Dinosaurs	**The Critic**	Home Improvement (2/20.4)	**Grace Under Fire** (R)	**Turning Point** (20/13.8)	
ABC	Summer	**Thunder Alley** (R)	**Phenom** (R)	Home Improvement (2/20.4)	**Grace Under Fire** (R)	**Turning Point** (20/13.8)	
CBS	Fall	MLB on CBS					
CBS	Mid-fall	Hearts Afire	**The Nanny**	Special programming		48 Hours	
CBS	Winter	**The Nanny**	Hearts Afire	In the Heat of the Night		48 Hours	
CBS	Late winter	**The Nanny**	**Tom**	In the Heat of the Night		48 Hours	
CBS	Spring	**The Nanny**	Good Advice	**America Tonight**		48 Hours	
CBS	Summer	**The Nanny**	**Muddling Through** (R)	**America Tonight**		48 Hours	
Fox	Fall	Beverly Hills, 90210		Melrose Place		Local programming	
Fox	Summer	Beverly Hills, 90210		**Models Inc.**		Local programming	
NBC		Unsolved Mysteries		**Now with Tom Brokaw and Katie Couric**		Law & Order	

Note: After airing only a single episode of South of Sunset on October 27, CBS cancelled the show and broadcast no further episodes.

== Thursday ==
Network		8:00 p.m.	8:30 p.m.	9:00 p.m.	9:30 p.m.	10:00 p.m.	10:30 p.m.
ABC	Fall	**Missing Persons**		Matlock		Primetime Live (17/14.0)	
ABC	Winter	**The Byrds of Paradise**		Matlock		Primetime Live (17/14.0)	
ABC	Summer	Matlock (R)				Primetime Live (17/14.0)	
ABC	Mid-summer	Matlock (R)		The Commish		Primetime Live (17/14.0)	
CBS	Fall	In the Heat of the Night		**Eye to Eye with Connie Chung**		**Angel Falls**	
CBS	Mid-fall	In the Heat of the Night		**Eye to Eye with Connie Chung**		Various programming	
CBS	Late fall	In the Heat of the Night		**Eye to Eye with Connie Chung**		**Second Chances**	
CBS	Winter	How'd They Do That?		**Eye to Eye with Connie Chung**		**Second Chances**	
CBS	Spring	**Christy**		**Eye to Eye with Connie Chung**		**Traps**	
CBS	Mid-spring	Special programming				**Eye to Eye with Connie Chung**	
CBS	Late spring	How'd They Do That?		**Eye to Eye with Connie Chung**		Picket Fences (R)	
CBS	Summer	In the Heat of the Night (R)		**Eye to Eye with Connie Chung**		Picket Fences (R)	
CBS	Mid-summer	**One West Waikiki**		**Eye to Eye with Connie Chung**		**Hotel Malibu**	
Fox	Fall	The Simpsons	**The Sinbad Show**	In Living Color	Herman's Head	Local programming	
Fox	Spring	The Simpsons	The Simpsons (R)	In Living Color	Various programming	Local programming	
Fox	Late spring	The Simpsons	**The Sinbad Show** (R)	In Living Color	Herman's Head (R)	Local programming	
Fox	Summer	The Simpsons	**The Sinbad Show** (R)	In Living Color	**Bakersfield P.D.**	Local programming	
Fox	Mid-summer	Martin (R)	**Living Single** (R)	In Living Color	**Bakersfield P.D.**	Local programming	
NBC	Fall	Mad About You	Wings (18/13.9) (Tied with NYPD Blue)	Seinfeld (3/19.4)	**Frasier** (7/16.8)	L.A. Law	
NBC	Winter	Mad About You	Wings (18/13.9) (Tied with NYPD Blue)	Seinfeld (3/19.4)	**Frasier** (7/16.8)	Homicide: Life on the Street (24/13.5)	
NBC	Mid-winter	Mad About You	Wings (18/13.9) (Tied with NYPD Blue)	Seinfeld (3/19.4)	**Frasier** (7/16.8)	L.A. Law	
NBC	Spring	Mad About You	Wings (18/13.9) (Tied with NYPD Blue)	Seinfeld (3/19.4)	**Frasier** (7/16.8)	Law & Order (R)	
NBC	Summer	Mad About You	Wings (18/13.9) (Tied with NYPD Blue)	Seinfeld (3/19.4)	**Frasier** (7/16.8)	Dateline NBC	

== Friday ==
Network		8:00 p.m.	8:30 p.m.	9:00 p.m.	9:30 p.m.	10:00 p.m.	10:30 p.m.
ABC	Fall	Family Matters (30/12.6) (Tied with The ABC Sunday Night Movie)	**Boy Meets World**	Step by Step	Hangin' with Mr. Cooper	20/20 (15/14.3)	
ABC	Spring	Family Matters (30/12.6) (Tied with The ABC Sunday Night Movie)	**Boy Meets World**	Step by Step	**Sister, Sister**	20/20 (15/14.3)	
ABC	Mid-spring	Family Matters (30/12.6) (Tied with The ABC Sunday Night Movie)	**Boy Meets World**	Step by Step	Hangin' with Mr. Cooper	20/20 (15/14.3)	
CBS	Fall	**It Had to Be You**	**Family Album**	Various programming			
CBS	Mid-fall	**Diagnosis: Murder**		Bob	**Family Album**	Picket Fences	
CBS	Late fall	**Diagnosis: Murder**		Special programming		Picket Fences	
CBS	Winter	**Diagnosis: Murder**		**Burke's Law**		Picket Fences	
Fox	Fall	**The Adventures of Brisco County, Jr.**		**The X-Files**		Local programming	
Fox	Summer	**Encounters: The Hidden Truth**		**The X-Files**		Local programming	
NBC	Fall	**Against the Grain**		NBC Friday Night Mystery			
NBC	Mid-fall	Special programming		NBC Friday Night Mystery			
NBC	Winter	**Viper**		NBC Friday Night Mystery			
NBC	Spring	Special programming		NBC Friday Night Mystery			
NBC	Summer	I Witness Video		NBC Friday Night Mystery			

Note: On CBS, Good Advice was to have returned on this night at 9 p.m., followed by Bob at 9:30 p.m. Late changes resulted in Bob beginning at 9 p.m., Family Album moving to 9:30 p.m. in mid-October, It Had to Be You being canceled at the same time, and Good Advice not returning till the following May. Additionally, Diagnosis: Murder premiered in late October to fill the 8–9 p.m. hour.

== Saturday ==
Network		8:00 p.m.	8:30 p.m.	9:00 p.m.	9:30 p.m.	10:00 p.m.	10:30 p.m.
ABC	Fall	The ABC Saturday Night Movie				The Commish	
ABC	Mid-fall	**George**	Where I Live	Various programming		The Commish	
ABC	Late fall	The ABC Saturday Night Movie				The Commish	
CBS	Fall	MLB on CBS					
CBS	Mid-fall	Dr. Quinn, Medicine Woman (25/13.3) (Tied with The CBS Tuesday Movie)		**Harts of the West**		Walker, Texas Ranger	
CBS	Late winter	Dr. Quinn, Medicine Woman (25/13.3) (Tied with The CBS Tuesday Movie)		**The Road Home**		Walker, Texas Ranger	
CBS	Spring	Dr. Quinn, Medicine Woman (25/13.3) (Tied with The CBS Tuesday Movie)		Various programming		Walker, Texas Ranger	
CBS	Late spring	Dr. Quinn, Medicine Woman (25/13.3) (Tied with The CBS Tuesday Movie)		**Harts of the West**		Walker, Texas Ranger	
CBS	Summer	Dr. Quinn, Medicine Woman (25/13.3) (Tied with The CBS Tuesday Movie)		**Muddling Through**	Hearts Afire	Walker, Texas Ranger	
Fox	Fall	COPS	COPS (R)	Front Page		Local programming	
Fox	Winter	COPS	COPS (R)	America's Most Wanted		Local programming	
NBC	Fall	**The Mommies**	**Café Americain**	Empty Nest	Nurses	Sisters	
NBC	Winter	**The Mommies**	Getting By	Empty Nest	Nurses	Sisters	
NBC	Late winter	Blossom	**The Mommies**	Empty Nest	Nurses	**Winnetka Road**	
NBC	Spring	Blossom	**The Mommies**	Empty Nest	Nurses	Sisters	
NBC	Late spring	**The Mommies** (R)	Getting By	Empty Nest	Nurses	Sisters	
NBC	Summer	NBC Saturday Night Movie				Sisters	
NBC	Mid-summer	**The Mommies** (R)	Empty Nest (R)	NBC Saturday Night Movie			

Note: NBC was scheduled to show its portion of Baseball Night in America in August and September 1994, but those games were cancelled by the Major League Baseball players' strike.

== By network ==
=== ABC ===
Returning series

- 20/20
- ABC's Monday Night Football
- The ABC Monday Night Movie
- The ABC Saturday Night Movie
- The ABC Sunday Night Movie
- America's Funniest Home Videos
- America's Funniest People
- Coach
- The Commish
- Day One
- Dinosaurs
- Family Matters
- FBI: The Untold Stories
- Full House
- Hangin' with Mr. Cooper
- Home Improvement
- Matlock
- Primetime Live
- Roseanne
- Step by Step
- Where I Live

New series

- **Baseball Night in America**
- **Birdland** *
- **Boy Meets World**
- **The Byrds of Paradise** *
- **The Critic** *
- **Ellen** *
- **George**
- **Grace Under Fire**
- **Joe's Life**
- **Lois & Clark: The New Adventures of Superman**
- **Missing Persons**
- **Moon Over Miami**
- **NYPD Blue**
- **The Paula Poundstone Show**
- **Phenom**
- **She TV** *
- **Sister, Sister** *
- **Thea**
- **Thunder Alley** *
- **Turning Point** *

Not returning from 1992–93:

- American Detective
- Camp Wilder
- Civil Wars
- Covington Cross
- Crossroads
- Delta
- Doogie Howser, M.D.
- Getting By (moved to NBC)
- Going to Extremes
- Home Free
- Homefront
- Jack's Place
- The Jackie Thomas Show
- Laurie Hill
- Life Goes On
- Perfect Strangers
- Room for Two
- Sirens (moved to syndication in 1994)
- Street Match
- The Wonder Years
- The Young Indiana Jones Chronicles
- Wild Palms

=== CBS ===
Returning series

- 48 Hours
- 60 Minutes
- Bob
- Dr. Quinn, Medicine Woman
- Evening Shade
- Good Advice
- Hearts Afire
- In the Heat of the Night
- Love & War
- Murder, She Wrote
- Murphy Brown
- Northern Exposure
- Picket Fences
- Rescue 911
- Walker, Texas Ranger

New series

- **704 Hauser** *
- **America Tonight** *
- **Angel Falls**
- **Burke's Law** *
- **Christy** *
- **Dave's World**
- **Diagnosis: Murder** *
- **Eye to Eye with Connie Chung**
- **Family Album**
- **Harts of the West**
- **Hotel Malibu** *
- **It Had to Be You**
- **Muddling Through** *
- **The Nanny**
- **One West Waikiki** *
- **The Road Home** *
- **Second Chances** *
- **South of Sunset**
- **Tom** *
- **Traps** *

Not returning from 1992–93:

- Angel Street
- Bodies of Evidence
- The Boys
- Brooklyn Bridge
- The Building
- Cutters
- Designing Women
- Dudley
- Family Dog
- Frannie's Turn
- The Golden Palace
- The Hat Squad
- How'd They Do That?
- Johnny Bago
- Knots Landing
- A League of Their Own
- Major Dad
- Middle Ages
- Raven
- Space Rangers
- Street Stories with Ed Bradley
- Top Cops
- Tall Hopes
- The Trouble with Larry

=== Fox ===
Returning series

- America's Most Wanted
- Beverly Hills, 90210
- Code 3
- Comic Strip Live
- Cops
- Fox Night at the Movies
- The Front Page
- Herman's Head
- In Living Color
- Married... with Children
- Martin
- Melrose Place
- Roc
- The Simpsons

New series

- **The Adventures of Brisco County, Jr.**
- **Bakersfield P.D.**
- **Daddy Dearest**
- **Encounters: The Hidden Truth** *
- **The George Carlin Show** *
- **Living Single**
- **Models Inc.**
- **Monty** *
- **The Sinbad Show**
- **South Central** *
- **Townsend Television**
- **The X-Files**

Not returning from 1992–93:

- Batman: The Animated Series (returned to daytime)
- The Ben Stiller Show
- Class of '96
- Danger Theatre
- Down the Shore
- The Edge
- Flying Blind
- Great Scott!
- The Heights
- Key West
- Likely Suspects
- Parker Lewis Can't Lose
- Shaky Ground
- Sightings (moved to syndication)
- TriBeCa
- Woops!

=== NBC ===
Returning series

- Blossom
- Dateline NBC
- Empty Nest
- The Fresh Prince of Bel-Air
- Getting By (moved from ABC)
- Homicide: Life on the Street
- I Witness Video
- L.A. Law
- Law & Order
- Mad About You
- NBC Sunday Night Movie
- The NBC Monday Movie
- Nurses
- Seinfeld
- Sisters
- Unsolved Mysteries
- Wings

New series

- **Against the Grain**
- **Café Americain**
- **Frasier**
- **The Good Life** *
- **The John Larroquette Show**
- **The Mommies**
- **Now with Tom Brokaw and Katie Couric** *
- **Saved by the Bell: The College Years**
- **seaQuest DSV**
- **The Second Half**
- **Someone Like Me** *
- **TV Nation** *
- **Viper** *
- **Winnetka Road** *

Not returning from 1992–93:

- Almost Home
- Black Tie Affair
- Cheers
- Crime & Punishment
- A Different World
- Final Appeal
- Here and Now
- I'll Fly Away
- Out All Night
- The Powers That Be
- Quantum Leap
- Reasonable Doubts
- Rhythm & Blues
- The Round Table
- Route 66
- Secret Service
- South Beach
- Super Bloopers and New Practical Jokes
- What Happened?

Note: The * indicates that the program was introduced in midseason.
