= The John Larroquette Show =

American sitcom (1993–1996)

- Genre: Sitcom
- Created by: Don Reo
- Starring: John Larroquette; Liz Torres; Gigi Rice; Daryl Mitchell; Chi McBride; Lenny Clarke; Elizabeth Berridge; John F. O'Donohue; Bill Morey; Alison La Placa; Jazzmun
- Opening theme: "Skrewy St. Louis Blues" by David Cassidy (1993–1995)
- Country of origin: United States
- Original language: English
- No. of seasons: 4
- No. of episodes: 84 (6 unaired)

Production
- Executive producers: Paul Junger Witt; Don Reo; Tony Thomas; John Larroquette
- Camera setup: Multi-camera
- Running time: 30 minutes
- Production companies: Impact Zone Productions; Port Street Films; Witt/Thomas Productions; Warner Bros. Television

Original release
- Network: NBC
- Release: September 2, 1993 – October 30, 1996

The John Larroquette Show is an American sitcom television series that was created by Don Reo for NBC. The John Larroquette Show was a star vehicle for John Larroquette following his run as Dan Fielding on Night Court. The series takes place in a seedy bus terminal in St. Louis, Missouri, and originally focused on the somewhat broken people who worked the night shift, and in particular, the lead character's battle with alcoholism. The series was produced by Reo's Impact Zone Productions, Larroquette's Port Street Films and Witt/Thomas Productions in association with Warner Bros. Television.

It premiered on September 2, 1993 and ended on October 30, 1996, with a total of 84 episodes over the course of four seasons, although six of those episodes were never aired. NBC canceled the series after airing only six episodes in season four.

== Plot ==
John Hemingway, recovering alcoholic, has been appointed to the role of night shift manager of the St. Louis bus depot. He must deal not only with the intricacies of keeping the station running smoothly, but also the employees and other personalities who frequent the station, all while dealing with his own demons. This was highlighted in the first episode, with a running gag of every character offering to buy him a drink upon his meeting them.

Most of the first season dealt with John's attempts to stay sober, with episodes representing each of the AA program's Twelve Steps. John constantly struggled to maintain control of the station, with regular conflicts with his secretary, Mahalia, the janitor, Heavy Gene, and most strongly with sandwich bar attendant Dexter, who had been turned down for the position to which John was appointed. Adding sexual tension to John's life was high class escort Carly, who was a friend of Dexter's.

Beginning with the second season, Hemingway (and the entire cast) changed from the night shift to the daytime hours, and the alcoholism sub-plot was de-emphasized.

== Cast ==
The show was unusual for occasionally addressing issues of race through a multiracial cast, unlike most American sitcoms in the 1990s.

- John Larroquette as John Hemingway
- Liz Torres as Mahalia Sanchez, John's secretary
- Gigi Rice as Carly Watkins, a high class escort and friend of Dexter's
- Daryl "Chill" Mitchell as Dexter Wilson, the depot's sandwich bar attendant and John's rival
- Chi McBride as Heavy Gene, a janitor at the depot
- Lenny Clarke as Officer Adam Hampton
- Elizabeth Berridge as Officer Eve Eggers
- Alison La Placa as Catherine Merrick (1994–1996)
- John F. O'Donohue as Max Dumas (1993–1994)
- Bill Morey as Oscar (1994–1996)
- Jazzmun as Pat (occasional, 1993–1995)

=== Recurring role ===
- David Crosby as Chester, John's AA sponsor.
- Omri Katz as Tony Hemingway, John's son. Katz would be replaced in an unaired fourth-season episode with Ryan Reynolds.
- Mayim Bialik as Rachel, John's daughter
- Ted McGinley as Karl Reese, Carly's boyfriend and future husband

Over the course of its run, the show also featured cameos from a number of celebrities. Betty White, Rue McClanahan and Estelle Getty played themselves in a Golden Girls/Sunset Boulevard inspired episode. Fellow Night Court actors Harry Anderson, Charles Robinson and Marsha Warfield each appeared in an episode. David Cassidy, who composed the theme song used for the show's first two seasons, fell down drunk in the bus station near the end of the second season. June Lockhart and Richard Mulligan appeared in separate episodes as John's parents. Boyz II Men appeared in a 1994 episode that saw their tour bus break down at John's station. Joe Pesci, Richard S. "Kinky" Friedman, Dennis Miller, George Hamilton and Ray Charles also appeared playing themselves in episodes.

Other notable guest appearances included Bobcat Goldthwait, Matthew Perry, Dick Martin, Phil Hartman, Rip Torn, Jane Lynch, Tim Daly, Marion Ross, Donna Mills, Art LaFleur, Joey Lawrence, Molly Shannon, Philip Baker Hall, Rob LaBelle, Len Lesser, Deezer D, Cheryl Tiegs, Dinah Manoff and Mila Kunis.

== Episodes ==
=== Series overview ===
Season	Episodes	Originally released	
Season	Episodes	First released	Last released
1	24	September 2, 1993	April 12, 1994
2	24	September 20, 1994	August 29, 1995
3	24	September 30, 1995	May 21, 1996
4	12	September 18, 1996	October 30, 1996

=== Season 1 (1993–94) ===
No. overall	No. in season	Title	Directed by	Written by	Original release date	Prod. code	US viewers (millions)
1	1	"Pilot"	John Whitesell	Don Reo	September 2, 1993	001	19.8
Recovering alcoholic John Hemingway takes the night manager position in a run-down bus station, where the staff's antics and the job's responsibilities test his resolve to stay sober.
2	2	"Thirty Day Chip"	John Whitesell	Don Reo & Judith D. Allison	September 7, 1993	002	18.1
Having managed thirty days of sobriety, John hopes to reconcile with his wife only to be served with divorce papers before he has the chance.
3	3	"Celibate!"	John Whitesell	James Vallely	September 14, 1993	003	14.7
In order to prove that he is serious about staying sober, John must promise his AA sponsor, Chester, that he will remain celibate for six months. This proves difficult when a young, unfulfilled, married woman passes through the depot.
4	4	"This Is Not a Step"	John Whitesell	Mitchell Hurwitz	September 21, 1993	004	14.6
John has to bail his con artist mother (June Lockhart) out of jail. Her reentry into his life conjures up painful memories of his childhood. Matters are further complicated when credit card slips go missing at the depot.
5	5	"The Unforgiven"	John Whitesell	Eva Needleman	September 28, 1993	005	13.1
John juggles helping a runaway teen and his promise to Chester that he will make a list of all his wrongdoings and share it with someone as part of his commitment to AA.
6	6	"Pros and Cons"	John Whitesell	Bill Richmond	October 5, 1993	006	13.3
A friend/con artist from John's drinking days offers to cut him in on a lucrative real-estate scam only to cheat Mahalia out of her savings. Meanwhile the regulars at the depot hatch a plan to aid the escape of a naive teenager from a bounty hunter's custody.
7	7	"Jumping Off the Wagon"	John Whitesell	Brenda Hampton	October 12, 1993	007	17.5
John's commitment to sobriety is tested by mounting pressure--including his sponsor's relapse and a petty gangster's protection racket.
8	8	"The Past Comes Back"	John Whitesell	Don Reo & Judith D. Allison	October 26, 1993	008	10.6
John questions his sexuality after he finds out that he may have been seduced by another man while he was blackout drunk.
9	9	"There's a Mister Hitler Here to See You"	John Whitesell	J.J. Wall	November 2, 1993	010	12.7
John lands in trouble with the ACLU when he refuses to charter a bus for a neo-Nazi group while Dexter is blackmailed by a corrupt health inspector, Meanwhile an old writer friend of John's returns and reveals that he has written John's past into a novel.
10	10	"Amends"	John Whitesell	Don Reo & Judith D. Allison	November 23, 1993	009	16.3
John visits his first ex-wife and his son, who John has not seen since he was a baby.
11	11	"Newcomer"	John Whitesell	Don Reo & Judith D. Allison	December 7, 1993	013	11.0
John's new love affair hits a road bump when his girlfriend joins AA and must observe celibacy for six months.
12	12	"My Hero"	John Whitesell	Bill Richmond	December 14, 1993	012	10.5
John has to talk sense into his alcoholic nephew who he introduced to drinking in the first place.
13	13	"God"	John Whitesell	James Vallely	December 21, 1993	011	12.4
John gets hooked into a crap game and is caught stealing money from the register by Mahalia, who forces John to pray to the almighty for forgiveness. Meanwhile, Dexter finds out that his new girlfriend is a call girl.
14	14	"The Big Slip"	John Whitesell	Michael Hurwitz & James Vallely	January 4, 1994	016	12.1
John is ordered to train his boss's unusual nephew (Bobcat Goldthwait) for a job at the station. It turns out that his eccentric behavior is the result of his being in AA for a year.
15	15	"Death and Dishonor"	John Whitesell	Don Reo & Judith D. Allison	January 11, 1994	015	11.3
John must handle a feud between Mahalia and her sister Linda while coping with the death of Chester.
16	16	"Don't Drink and Drive Nuclear Waste"	John Whitesell	J.J. Wall	January 18, 1994	018	13.0
John damages the official U.S. inch, and worries that one of the station's drivers is drinking on the job.
17	17	"Eggs"	John Whitesell	Eve Needleman	January 30, 1994	020	17.8
When Dexter's truck breaks down he ends up staying in a dingy motel with John and some crates
18	18	"Dirty Deeds"	John Whitesell	Don Reo & Judith D. Allison	February 1, 1994	014	13.0
John runs into his old college roommate dressed as Marlene Dietrich at a drag show. Mahalia is blackmailed over an appearance she made in a dirty movie.
19	19	"Another Average Night"	John Whitesell	Don Reo & Judith D. Allison	February 1, 1994	019	14.5
John discovers that his current girlfriend is married and is soon confronted at gunpoint by her husband. Mahalia's ex-husband (Miguel Perez) visits.
20	20	"John and Carol"	John Whitesell	Dorothy Reo	February 8, 1994	017	12.8
John and his ex-wife (John Larroquette, guest star Donna Mills) have an argument at the station when their son (guest star Omri Katz) appears on John's doorstep.
21	21	"Grit"	John Whitesell	J.J. Wall	March 15, 1994	022	12.4
Eggers (Elizabeth Berridge) develops a crush on John (John Larroquette) after he rescues her from a crazed gunman.
22	22	"Date Night"	John Whitesell	Don Reo & Judith D. Allison	March 22, 1994	023	9.7
Dexter is outraged when his sister strikes up a friendship with Hemingway; Mahalia is overjoyed to hear her first boyfriend is coming to visit; Carly reports to Hemingway that she was sent out on a house call-to his son.
23	23	"Wasted Lives"	John Whitesell	Mitchell Hurwitz & Jim Vallely	March 29, 1994	021	11.1
John becomes an AA sponsor but ends up accidentally eating a pot brownie and gets really high. Adam meets his estranged father who wants something from him. Also, actor Joe Pesci (playing himself) briefly visits Oscar for selfish reasons.
24	24	"A Dark and Stormy Night"	Greg Antonacci	Don Reo	April 12, 1994	024	11.3
John feels suicidal on his birthday, but discovers new meaning when the bus station is held hostage.

=== Season 2 (1994–95) ===
No. overall	No. in season	Title	Directed by	Written by	Original release date	Prod. code	US viewers (millions)
25	1	"Changes"	John Whitesell	Don Reo & Judith D. Allison	September 20, 1994	025	16.5
The show is retooled as John gets a new apartment, is moved to the day shift at the bus station, and strikes up a friendship with Catherine Merrick, a night shift nurse and potential love interest.
26	2	"Hiding Out"	John Whitesell	Don Reo & Judith D. Allison	September 27, 1994	026	16.0
27	3	"A Bird in the Hand"	John Whitesell	Don Reo & Judith D. Allison	October 4, 1994	027	17.5
28	4	"Good News/Bad News"	John Whitesell	Eve Needleman	October 18, 1994	029	15.1
29	5	"The Tutor"	John Whitesell	J.J. Wall	October 25, 1994	031	15.6
30	6	"Acting Alone"	John Whitesell	Mitchell Hurwitz	November 1, 1994	030	17.7
The guys find a film in a storage room that shows the JFK assassination from a different angle. Meanwhile, Eggers decides she wants John to sire her baby.
31	7	"Vacation"	John Whitesell	Don Reo & Judith D. Allison	November 8, 1994	032	13.7
32	8	"The Book of Rachel"	John Whitesell	Don Reo & Judith D. Allison	November 15, 1994	033	15.7
A free-spirited young hippie claims to be John's illegitimate daughter.
33	9	"Freedom's Just Another Word for Nothing Left to Lose, But Then So's Desperate"	John Whitesell	Don Reo & Judith D. Allison	November 22, 1994	034	17.1
Mahalia attracts an admirer who wants to buy her a cheese sandwich. Dexter's impression of Carly's lousy mood moves John to cheer her up with a dance but unfortunately, Catherine walks in on them.
34	10	"Just Like a Woman"	John Whitesell	Ron Zimmerman	November 29, 1994	035	16.3
Dexter dates a beautiful woman who shares John's name (the woman's father always wanted a boy). When Dexter kisses her he only sees John (Larroquette) with long hair.
35	11	"A Cult to the System"	John Whitesell	James Vallely	December 6, 1994	028	15.3
John learns that his estranged son has joined a cult and tries to discourage him away from it.
36	12	"The Job"	John Whitesell	Bill Richmond	December 13, 1994	036	16.0
John hears about a better paying job opening at the New Orleans bus station. When he arrives he finds his co-workers are also applying for the same job.
37	13	"Faith"	Gil Junger	David Richardson	January 10, 1995	037	17.6
A face appears on an outside wall of the bus station that has a very Jesus like look. Everyone but John thinks it is a sign and pray to it.
38	14	"The Defiant One"	John Whitesell	J.J. Wall	January 17, 1995	039	16.0
John sticks up for Dexter and Gene when they are profiled and arrested for just standing around outside a theater, but his tirade gets him arrested also.
39	15	"Wrestling Matches"	Gil Junger	James Vallely	January 31, 1995	038	13.8
John's old drunk acquaintance Jefferson Kelly (played by David Cassidy) shows up rolling down some stairs to the station floor. John decides to help him dry up.
40	16	"Whipping Post"	John Whitesell	David Richardson	February 7, 1995	040	14.3
Carley's brother (Joey Lawrence) visits the bus station and John realizes he can't read when he can't read the sign to Carley's Bar.
41	17	"Bad Pennies"	John Whitesell	Don Reo & Judith D. Allison	February 14, 1995	042	15.6
Catherine's ex-husband returns, drunk, in hopes of winning her back
42	18	"Time Out"	John Whitesell	Don Reo & Judith D. Allison	February 28, 1995	041	15.9
John is visited by a former schoolmate (Cheryl Tiegs) after Catherine puts their romance on hold.
43	19	"In the Pink"	John Whitesell	Teresa O'Neill	March 7, 1995	046	13.4
Dexter is left in charge of the bus station for one disastrous night.
44	20	"You Bet Your Life"	John Whitesell	Teresa O'Neill	March 14, 1995	043	14.3
45	21	"Rachel Redux"	John Whitesell	Don Reo & Judith D. Allison	May 9, 1995	048	16.0
46	22	"Several Unusual Love Stories"	John Whitesell	Dorothy Reo	May 23, 1995	045	15.1
47	23	"The Wedding"	John Whitesell	Mitchell Hurwitz & Jim Vallely	August 22, 1995	047	14.9
48	24	"And the Heat Goes On"	Gil Junger	Catherine LePard	August 29, 1995	044	12.9

=== Season 3 (1995–96) ===
No. overall	No. in season	Title	Directed by	Written by	Original release date	Prod. code	US viewers (millions)
49	1	"More Changes"	John Whitesell	Mitchell Hurwitz	September 30, 1995	049	10.6
John proposes to Catherine, but both of them fail to show up at their own wedding.
50	2	"Even More Changes"	John Whitesell	Mitchell Hurwitz	October 7, 1995	050	8.9
Even more changes rock their relationship after John and Catherine (John Larroquette and Alison La Placa) decide to try dating again.
51	3	"Rachel and Tony"	John Whitesell	Don Reo & Judith D. Allison	October 21, 1995	052	8.7
Unaware they are related, John's children (Mayim Bialik and Omri Katz), meet, hit it off and leave together.
52	4	"A Moveable Feast"	John Whitesell	Martin Weiss	November 4, 1995	051	8.0
A newspaper editor accuses John of committing plagiarism to win a writing contest.
53	5	"Johns"	John Whitesell	Michael Davidoff & Bill Rosenthal	November 14, 1995	053	15.0
John becomes jealous when another man named John asks Catherine out on a date.
54	6	"Night Moves"	John Whitesell	Michael Davidoff & Bill Rosenthal	December 12, 1995	059	14.5
Carly introduces her millionaire boyfriend, who has an unexpected connection to Dexter. Meanwhile, John and Catherine flirt with the danger of possible break-ins.
55	7	"An Odd Cup of Tea"	John Whitesell	John Ridley	December 19, 1995	055	18.5
To check items off his bucket list, John tries skydiving and visits his childhood home, and surprises ensue. Catherine displays her vocal chops, and Hampton does a sit-up and receives flowers.
56	8	"Love on the Line"	John Whitesell	John Ridley	December 26, 1995	057	13.1
Disguising his online identity, John uses the internet to make a date with Catherine.
57	9	"Master Class"	John Whitesell	Pam Brady	January 2, 1996	056	14.4
John's ego is shattered when he and Dexter enroll in a creative-writing class.
58	10	"Ring of Fire"	John Whitesell	Martin Weiss	January 9, 1996	058	19.1
Gene makes his professional boxing debut; John is seduced by Mahalia's younger sister.
59	11	"John's Lucky Day"	John Whitesell	Don Reo & Judith D. Allison	January 16, 1996	054	17.4
John's luck reaches an end when he bets Catherine's money and the bookie disappears with the winnings.
60	12	"Black and White and Red All Over"	John Whitesell	Ursula Ziegler & Steve Sullivan	January 30, 1996	061	16.5
A seductive performance artist invites John to her loft after John writes a scathing newspaper review of her work.
61	13	"The Housewarming"	John Whitesell	Pam Brady	February 6, 1996	063	18.8
John ends up sharing a house with his old flame Carley when he leases the house owned by her boyfriend.
62	14	"Cosmetic Perjury"	John Whitesell	Les Eberhard	February 13, 1996	065	16.1
Eve considers a breast reduction so John takes her to consult a plastic surgeon (Harry Anderson). When Eve calls John an older man, John then considers age reducing plastic surgery.
63	15	"The Train Wreck"	John Whitesell	Donald Seigel	February 20, 1996	062	17.2
John's romantic weekend plans with a Yoga Instructor get derailed when he spots Catherine with her old beau riding the same train to a mud bath health resort they had reserved before breaking up.
64	16	"Some Call Them Beasts"	John Whitesell	Martin Weiss	February 27, 1996	066	16.7
Disaster ensues when John finagles an invitation to a cocktail party hosted by his favorite author.
65	17	"Here We Go Again"	John Whitesell	Michael Davidoff & Bill Rosenthal & James Vallely & Mitchell Hurwitz	March 12, 1996	067	17.3
John and Catherine collaborate in a bus-station production of "Golden Girls: The Musical."
66	18	"The Dance"	John Whitesell	David Landsberg	March 26, 1996	060	17.5
John and Catherine start bickering when he gives her dance lessons to help her prepare for a wedding.
67	19	"A Night to Remember"	John Whitesell	Jim Vallely & Mitchell Hurwitz	April 9, 1996	064	17.1
After Gene finally cleans the men's bathroom, John suddenly remembers a night nine years ago when he passed through as a passenger.
68	20	"Independence Day"	John Whitesell	Pam Brady	April 23, 1996	069	17.7
John (John Larroquette) mistakenly is hailed as a new Hispanic leader after entering a writing contest. With Liz Torres.
69	21	"Hello, Baby, Hello"	John Whitesell	Jim Vallely & Mitchell Hurwitz	April 30, 1996	068	15.2
Gene becoming a father causes Catherine to realize she wants a baby. She asks John to be the father and he agrees, which causes an emotional roller coaster between the two of them. Meanwhile, Dexter joins a reality show "the Reality House".
70	22	"Intern Writer"	John Whitesell	Will Gluck	May 7, 1996	071	12.1
John gets an internship at a newspaper which doesn't turn out to be the dream job he pictured until he's tasked with the obits that turns into an investigation of the paper's publisher's death. And Gene struggles to comfort his newborn.
71	23	"Running for Carly"	John Whitesell	John Levenstein	May 14, 1996	070	13.2
As a favor to Carly, John reluctantly agrees to help her boyfriend, Karl, with his senate campaign. It becomes clear Karl's more into image than anything (which could hurt Carly), John throws his "ring into the hat" and runs himself.
72	24	"Happy Endings (Part 1)"	John Whitesell	Catherine LePard	May 21, 1996	072	14.5
John tries to keep his electric car charged. Carly breaks up with Karl and wants John back. Dexter warns John against it. Mahalia hits it off with John's landlord. There's a wedding and a giant shoe. Catherine has something to tell John.

=== Season 4 (1996) ===
No. overall	No. in season	Title	Directed by	Written by	Original release date	Prod. code	US viewers (millions)
73	1	"Untying the Knot (Part 2)"	David Trainer	Mitchell Hurwitz	September 18, 1996	073	11.4
On the day of Carly and John's wedding, Catherine tells John she's pregnant. When John tells Carly, Carly suggests Catherine stay with them. John wonders how he'll survive.
74	2	"Mother of the Year"	David Trainer	Pam Brady	September 25, 1996	075	9.1
As Mahalia is dealing with a custody battle, John writes an essay about her for a Mother of the Year contest. Her winning the contest sets off a series of unpleasant events.
75	3	"Bathing with Ernest Hemingway"	David Trainer	Donald Seigel	October 2, 1996	077	10.0
Feeling they aren't connecting like they should, fitness-freak Carly takes a literature course. In turn, brainy John decides to start working out, taking up Eggers's offer of her being his personal trainer at the police officers' gym.
76	4	"The Blues Traveler"	David Trainer	Paul Perlove	October 9, 1996	078	N/A
Carly and John break up after a therapy session. As a just friends favor, John goes to the airport to pick up Ray Charles, who's due to perform at Carly's bar, but he ends up leaving the musician behind and the bar without entertainment.
77	5	"Copies"	David Trainer	Tom Saunders & Kell Cahoon	October 16, 1996	076	N/A
Dexter invites his estranged father to watch a production of John's play; John misinterprets a sign from a man who doesn't speak English.
78	6	"Isosceles Love Triangle"	David Trainer	Will Gluck	October 30, 1996	079	10.7
After John gives Eggers advice on how to get the man of her dreams, she uses the opportunity to get him to agree to be her date for a Halloween party. Meanwhile, Gene must prove his mettle by cleaning up a toxic chemical spill. (Series Finale)
79	7	"Napping to Success"	David Trainer	John Levenstein	Unaired	080	N/A
80	8	"Cheeses H. Taste"	David Trainer	Pam Brady	Unaired	081	N/A
81	9	"When Yussel Learned to Yodel"	David Trainer	Tom Saunders & Kell Cahoon	Unaired	082	N/A
82	10	"Humble Pi"	David Trainer	Will Gluck	Unaired	083	N/A
83	11	"Friends"	David Trainer	Donald Seigel	Unaired	084	N/A
84	12	"Pandora's Box"	David Trainer	John Levenstein	Unaired	074	N/A

== History ==
Season	TV Season	Episodes	Time slot (ET)
1	1993–94	24	Thursday at 9:30 pm (Episode 1); Tuesday at 9:00 pm (Episodes 2–16, 18, 20–24); Sunday at 10:00 pm (Episode 17); Tuesday at 9:30 pm (Episode 19)
2	1994–95	24	Tuesday at 9:30 pm (Episodes 1-23); Tuesday at 8:30 pm (Episode 24)
3	1995–96	24	Saturday at 9:00 pm (Episodes 1–4); Tuesday at 9:30 pm (Episodes 5-24)
4	1996–97	12 (6 unaired)	Wednesday at 8:30 pm

Despite receiving early favorable critical reviews, the first season finished 96th overall, in part due to its time slot opposing Roseanne (which was fourth overall during the same season). By Larroquette's own admission, though, the show's first season wasn't prime-time material due to its dark nature – at least not for network television.

The show faced cancellation, until Larroquette requested the chance to retool the series, which NBC granted. Much of the dark humor was removed, for a more "toned-down" feel. The sets were brighter, and the cast were transferred from the night shift to day. John's dingy bed-sit was traded for a nice apartment. Oscar, the old bum who lived in one of the bus station phone booths, was cleaned up and became a shoeshine, and the prostitute character Carly (Gigi Rice) went "straight" – buying the bar and becoming a model citizen. The producers also gave John a wholesome romantic interest in the form of nurse Catherine Merrick, played by Alison La Placa. The series continued in this more prime-time-friendly format for two more years.

== Decline and cancellation ==
In an attempt to boost the third season opener, but without increasing the budget, it featured a faux guest appearance by Kelsey Grammer as Dr. Frasier Crane, whom John calls for advice (not knowing he is on Frasier's live radio program). Ratings did not improve, however. John and Carly got married in the third-season finale while Catherine was seemingly pregnant with John's child. It was revealed that Catherine was experiencing a phantom pregnancy and left the show. The John Larroquette Show was cancelled abruptly one month into its fourth season, the last episode airing on October 30, 1996, showing John and Officer Eggers on a date at a Halloween party. Six episodes remained unaired until being shown on the USA Network years later.

== Production ==
The series was originally to be called Crossroads; however, NBC wished to make the most of John Larroquette's popularity from his previous role on Night Court, and insisted on naming the show after him.

The show was videotaped, but processed by NBC to make it look like it was recorded on film. Reruns on other networks had the show in its original videotaped format.

== Subsequent airings and home release ==
The series was repeated several times, but by the early 2000's was no longer being transmitted on any terrestrial or cable television network globally.

The series has never been made available for home release and streaming. Online searches for access to the series would only lead to bootlegged copies of the series recorded off-air at some point in the later 1990's and in very poor quality.

In 2024, Rewind TV, broadcasting in some US states, ran the series in full. This was the first time the series was made available for consumption in over 2 decades.

== Theme song ==
The series' theme song, "The Skrewy St. Louis Blues", is a bluesy tune performed by David Cassidy on acoustic guitar with a scat vocal. A version of the performance lasting approximately one minute was used in the opening and closing sequences of the show during its first season. A much shorter edit of the song (lasting less than ten seconds) was heard only during the opening logo during the later seasons. An upbeat, jazzy instrumental tune was occasionally used for the closing theme in seasons three and four.

Steve Cochran, a former radio host on WGN Radio in Chicago, used the Cassidy song as the theme music for his own radio program up until he was fired.

== Critical reception ==
The Los Angeles Times once referred to the series as "sitcom noir".

The show was nominated and won several technical awards over its four-year run, and Larroquette was nominated in 1994 for Primetime Emmy Award for Outstanding Lead Actor in a Comedy Series. Guest star Betty White won the Primetime Emmy Award for Outstanding Guest Actress in a Comedy Series in 1996 for her appearance in the Season 3 episode "Here We Go Again".

Liz Torres, also nominated in 1994 for the Primetime Emmy Award for Outstanding Supporting Actress in a Comedy Series, won the NCLR/ALMA Award for Outstanding Individual Performance in a Comedy Series in 1996 for her role in the series. She would also win a Nosotros Golden Eagle Award for Outstanding Actress in a Television Series in 1997.

== Thomas Pynchon ==
After the series made several references to reclusive novelist Thomas Pynchon's work and reputation, Pynchon (through his agent) reportedly contacted the series' producers to offer suggestions and corrections. When a local Pynchon sighting became a major plot point in a 1994 episode of the series, Pynchon was sent the script for his approval; as well as providing the title of a fictitious work to be used in one episode ("Pandemonium of the Sun"), the novelist apparently vetoed a final scene that called for an extra playing him to be filmed from behind, walking away from the shot. Pynchon also insisted that it should be specifically mentioned in the episode that Pynchon was seen wearing a T-shirt showing psychedelic-rock musician Roky Erickson. According to the Los Angeles Times, this spurred an increase in sales of Erickson's albums.
