= Encounters (TV series) =

- Also known as: Encounters: The Hidden Truth
- Genre: Paranormal; Ufology; Conspiracy theory
- Directed by: John Jopson
- Country of origin: United States
- Original language: English
- No. of seasons: 3
- No. of episodes: 18

Production
- Running time: 60 minutes

Original release
- Network: Fox
- Release: 24 June 1994 – 23 January 1996

Related
- Sightings; Unsolved Mysteries

Encounters: The Hidden Truth is an hour-long television series featuring alleged accounts of paranormal phenomena. It was hosted by John Marshall and a team of reporters presenting three or four stories pertaining to UFOs, crop circles, exorcism, prophets, psychics, reincarnation, and other supernatural and paranormal phenomena per episode. In each installment, stories unfold through eyewitness interviews and reenactments of purported events in a news/documentary film style, and also feature the host and reporters discussing their reactions to some of the claims presented.

Encounters aired on Fox and was used mainly as a summer replacement series and fill-in show for other canceled series. The show first aired Fridays at 8:00 p.m. during the summer of 1994. The show then aired sporadically on different nights and at different times. In the final 3 editions of the show, Steven Williams (who played Mr. X on The X-Files) replaced John Marshall as the host. Two of those episodes aired in November 1995 and the final episode aired on January 23, 1996.

== Cast ==
- John Marshall - Host
- Russell Rhodes - Correspondent
- Sandra Pinckney - Correspondent
- Sandra Gin - Correspondent
- Linda Deleray - Correspondent
- Mark Thompson - Correspondent
- Vincent Neill - Director
- Steven Williams - Host, Season 3

== Broadcast history ==
| Season | Time |
|---|---|
| 1993–94 | Friday at 8:00 pm |
| 1994–95 | Sunday at 7:00 pm |
| 1995–96 | Saturday at 8:30 pm |

== Episodes ==
=== Special (1994) ===
| No. overall | No. in season | Title | Original release date | Viewers (millions) |
|---|---|---|---|---|
| S | 1 | "UFO Conspiracy" | February 22, 1994 | 7.3 |
UFO Conspiracy.

=== Season 1 (1994) ===
| No. overall | No. in season | Title | Original release date | Viewers (millions) |
|---|---|---|---|---|
| 1 | 1 | "Alien Contact" | June 24, 1994 | 5.5 |
Investigative reports on paranormal phenomena begin with alleged alien contacts. Included: mysterious crop circles; revelations by pilots and air-traffic controllers.
| 2 | 2 | "Cattle Mutilations" | July 1, 1994 | 4.6 |
Investigations into cattle mutilations; and an allegedly psychic family.
| 3 | 3 | "Exorcisms" | July 8, 1994 | 4.2 |
Pilot reports UFO, then disappears; events surrounding The Exorcist.
| 4 | 4 | "The Earthquake Sensitive" | July 15, 1994 | 4.9 |
Talks with people who claim to be earthquake sensitive. Also: modern-day prophets with predictions for the future.
| 5 | 5 | "UFO Home Videos" | July 22, 1994 | 5.5 |
Home videos of alleged UFOs; people who claim to have received implants from aliens; a UFO investigation organization.

=== Season 2 (1994–1995) ===
| No. overall | No. in season | Title | Original release date | Viewers (millions) |
|---|---|---|---|---|
| 6 | 1 | "Mars Formations" | October 9, 1994 | 4.9 |
Near-death experiences; formations on Mars that appear to have been constructed; research indicates an asteroid contains simple forms of life.
| 7 | 2 | "Bigfoot" | October 16, 1994 | 7.2 |
A search for Bigfoot; a mass UFO sighting by a group of schoolchildren; a haunted murder site.
| 8 | 3 | "Mars Wants Marilyn" | October 23, 1994 | 5.2 |
Allegations that Marilyn Monroe was killed to cover up her knowledge of extraterrestrials. Also: segments on exorcisms; children who claim to recall past lives; and a pilot who vanished after reporting a UFO sighting.
| 9 | 4 | "Astronaut UFO Encounters" | December 4, 1994 | 5.7 |
Alleged astronaut encounters with UFOs; a gravesite reported to contain the remains of an alien; a woman who claims to be Camelot's Guinevere reincarnated. Also: interest in the birth of a white buffalo.
| 10 | 5 | "Ghost Attack" | December 18, 1994 | 5.2 |
Reports of a ghost attack; film of alleged UFOs; a couple who claim to have contacted their murdered son; the continuing quest for the Loch Ness Monster.
| 11 | 6 | "Swarms of Birds and Bees" | January 13, 1995 | 5.6 |
People who experience constant low-pitched humming sounds; incidents involving swarming birds and bees. Also: a man who built a house shaped like a spaceship.
| 12 | 7 | "New England Vampires" | March 19, 1995 | 4.5 |
Alleged remains of a vampire; a house reportedly haunted by Elvis Presley; stones said to bring bad luck when removed from a volcano site in Hawaii.
| 13 | 8 | "Texas Schoolchildren Ghosts" | June 2, 1995 | 4.6 |
Stories about the alleged ghosts of schoolchildren who died in the 1930s; a segment on psychic hotlines; UFOs and aliens.
| 14 | 9 | "Genetic Hybrids" | June 9, 1995 | 4.4 |
Segments on genetic engineering; a California tourist attraction that's said to be haunted; and alleged clues to the location of Noah's Ark.

=== Season 3 (1995–1996) ===
| No. overall | No. in season | Title | Original release date | Viewers (millions) |
|---|---|---|---|---|
| 15 | 1 | "Psychics Among Us" | November 11, 1995 | 4.8 |
Psychics seek the Unabomber; forensic artist uses only skulls and bones to sculpt images; psychics' superhuman feats.
| 16 | 2 | "Future Fear" | November 18, 1995 | 4.0 |
Prospects for the next millennium, including technological and military developments. Also: Timothy Leary on cryogenics.
| 17 | 3 | "Mysteries of the Mind" | January 23, 1996 | 4.2 |
Rituals involving venomous snakes; instances of violent dreams; and the case of a handicapped woman struck by lightning.

== Releases ==
Encounters: The Hidden Truth has yet to be released on DVD or Blu-ray through Fox.

== See also ==
- Sightings (TV series)
- Unexplained Mysteries
