= Dream On =

Dream On may refer to:

== Film and television ==
- Dream On (film), a 2016 documentary starring John Fugelsang
- Dream On (30 for 30), a 2022 TV documentary about the US women's national basketball team of the mid-1990s
- Dream On (TV series), a 1990–1996 American sitcom

=== Television episodes ===
- "Dream On" (Degrassi High), 1989
- "Dream On" (Home Improvement), 1994
- "Dream On" (Beavis and Butt-Head), 1995
- "Dream On" (Pucca), 2006
- "Dream On" (Thomas & Friends), 2007
- "Dream On" (Glee), 2010
- "Dream On" (Stitch & Ai), 2017

== Literature ==
- Dream On, a 2002 novel by Bali Rai
- Dream On, a 2014 novel by Kerstin Gier

== Music ==
- Dream On (record label), a defunct label founded by Kid Cudi, Plain Pat, and Emile Haynie

=== Albums ===
- Dream On (album), by George Duke, or the title song, 1982
- Dream On, by Alice Boman, 2020
- Dream On, by Ernie Haase & Signature Sound, 2008
- Dream On, a disc in the deluxe edition of Katy Perry's album Teenage Dream, 2010

=== Songs ===
- "Dream On" (Aerosmith song), 1973
- "Dream On" (Amy Macdonald song), 2017
- "Dream On" (Christian Falk song), 2006
- "Dream On" (Depeche Mode song), 2001
- "Dream On" (Joan Kennedy song), 1993
- "Dream On" (Naoya Urata song), 2010
- "Dream On" (Nazareth song), 1982
- "Dream On" (Noel Gallagher's High Flying Birds song), 2012
- "Dream On" (The Righteous Brothers song), 1974; covered by the Oak Ridge Boys, 1979
- "Dream On (An Indian Lullaby)", written by Buddy DeSylva and Victor Herbert, 1922
- "Dream On", by Ben Rector from The Joy of Music, 2022
- "Dream On", by Blackfoot from Tomcattin', 1980
- "Dream On", by Britny Fox from Boys in Heat, 1989
- "Dream On", by Brotherhood of Man from Love and Kisses from Brotherhood of Man, 1976
- "Dream On", by the Chemical Brothers from Surrender, 1999
- "Dream On", by Dream Street from Dream Street, 2001
- "Dream On", by Dusty Springfield from Living Without Your Love, 1979
- "Dream On", by Gaither Vocal Band
- "Dream On", by Gotthard from Lipservice, 2005
- "Dream On", by Praise, 2000
- "Dream On", by Screaming Jets from Tear of Thought, 1992
- "Dream On", by Uriah Heep from Sea of Light, 1995

== See also ==
- Dream On
