= The Watcher (1995 TV series) =

- Genre: Anthology drama
- Created by: Christopher Crowe
- Written by: Harry Cason; Christopher Crowe; Andrew Mirisch; Robert Morgan Fisher; Dan Peterson
- Directed by: Vern Gillum; Keva Rosenfeld; Michael W. Watkins
- Starring: Sir Mix-a-Lot; Bobbie Phillips
- Narrated by: Sir Mix-a-Lot
- Composer: Joel Goldsmith
- Country of origin: United States
- Original language: English
- No. of seasons: 1
- No. of episodes: 13

Production
- Producer: Lindsley Parsons III
- Running time: 60 minutes
- Production companies: Christopher Crowe Productions; Paramount Television

Original release
- Network: UPN
- Release: January 17 – June 7, 1995

The Watcher is an American anthology drama series created by Christopher Crowe that premiered on UPN on January 17, 1995 and ended on June 7, 1995, during the network's inaugural season. The series aired Tuesday night at 9:00 p.m Eastern time.

== Synopsis ==
Set in Las Vegas, the series stars rapper Sir Mix-a-Lot as "The Watcher", an omniscient narrator who watches the activities of others all throughout the city of Las Vegas via all the monitors in his suite at the Riviera Hotel which are filming live from the hidden cameras all throughout the city. The Watcher also starred Bobbie Phillips as Lori Danforth, a limo driver.

The Watcher was one of five series that aired on UPN during its first year, joining other drama series Star Trek: Voyager and Marker and the sitcoms Pig Sty and Platypus Man. Like the latter three series, it was canceled following its one and only season.

== Guest stars ==
Guest stars include comedian and Howard Stern Show regular Jackie "The Jokeman" Martling, Max Wright, and comedians Gilbert Gottfried and D.L. Hughley, as well as the band Cheap Trick.

== Episodes ==
No.	Title	Original release date
1	"Pilot"	January 17, 1995
2	"Resurrection/Niles and Bob/Harry Stenz"	January 24, 1995
3	"Heartburned"	January 31, 1995
4	"A Change of Heart"	February 7, 1995
5	"Till There was You"	February 14, 1995
6	"No Hope for the Dead"	February 21, 1995
7	"Passion Plays"	February 28, 1995
8	"The Human Condition: The Blood of Our Children; Rita; The Comic"	March 14, 1995
9	"Missing Persons"	March 28, 1995
10	"Reversal of Fortune: The Last Act/Lucky Charm/Handle with Care"	April 4, 1995
11	"Second Chances: Last Time Around/Jack Flash/Hit Man"	April 11, 1995
12	"Apocalypse Now: Masters & Cherie/It Cuts Like a Knife/The Bet"	June 7, 1995
13	"Sudden Death: Dancing Bear/Life Lessons/The Stranger"	June 7, 1995
