= The Office (1995 TV series) =

1995 American television series

- Created by: Susan Beavers; Barbara Corday
- Written by: Susan Beavers; Ken Estin; Tami Yellin
- Directed by: Jay Sandrich
- Starring: Valerie Harper; Dakin Matthews; Debra Jo Rupp; Lisa Darr; Kristin Dattilo-Hayward; Kevin Conroy; Andrea Abbate; Gary Dourdan
- Composers: G*N*G Music
- Country of origin: United States
- Original language: English
- No. of seasons: 1
- No. of episodes: 6 (1 unaired)

Production
- Executive producers: Paul Junger Witt; Tony Thomas; Susan Beavers
- Producer: Gilbert Junger
- Production locations: Sunset Gower Studios; Hollywood, California
- Running time: 30 minutes
- Production companies: 5 a.m., Inc. Witt/Thomas Productions; Warner Bros. Television

Original release
- Network: CBS
- Release: March 11 – April 15, 1995

The Office is an American sitcom television series starring Valerie Harper that aired for six episodes on CBS from March 11 to April 15, 1995, as a mid-season replacement during the 1994–95 television season. The series, billed as an office comedy version of the British series Upstairs, Downstairs, centered on the camaraderie of executives and their secretaries of a busy corporate office at a design-packaging company.

== Synopsis ==
Rita Stone (Valerie Harper) is a divorcée and 19-year veteran of a secretarial pool at the executive office of a package design company in Chicago called Package Inc. She is outspoken and mainly the adhesive that holds things together at the company, seeing that everything gets done on time, mediating disputes and trying to be a good listener to both job-related and personal problems.

While Rita is responsible for the company's inept CEO, Frank (Dakin Matthews), she also manages three other secretaries: Beth (Debra Jo Rupp), a flustered mother of four who works for the company's only female executive, Natalie (Lisa Darr); Mae (Andrea Abbate), a free-spirited, thrice-divorced former temp who works for the firm's temperamental artist (Gary Dourdan); and Deborah (Kristin Dattilo-Hayward), a naive MBA student who works for a sleazy salesman (Kevin Conroy).

== Cast ==
- Valerie Harper as Rita Stone
- Dakin Matthews as Frank Gerard
- Debra Jo Rupp as Beth Avery
- Lisa Darr as Natalie Stanton
- Kristin Dattilo-Hayward as Deborah Beaumont
- Kevin Conroy as Steve Gilman
- Andrea Abbate as Mae D'arcy
- Gary Dourdan as Bobby Harold

== Episodes ==
No.	Title	Directed by	Written by	Original release date	Prod. code	Viewers (millions)
1	"Pilot: The Office"	Jay Sandrich	Story by : Susan Beavers & Barbara Corday; Teleplay by : Susan Beavers	March 11, 1995	001	12.8
Rita and the secretaries are upset and stage a job action when the boss announces that overtime pay is being eliminated by corporate headquarters.
2	"Laboring Pains"	Jay Sandrich	Susan Beavers	March 18, 1995	002	10.7
Beth is forced to bring her sick, havoc-wreaking 4-year-old son to the office on a day when Frank hopes to close a major deal.
3	"Rita & Frank"	Jay Sandrich	Ken Estin	March 25, 1995	004	7.5
Frank is jealous of Rita's new romance; meanwhile, Beth attempts to put the spark back into her marriage.
4	"Power Playing"	Jay Sandrich	Susan Beavers	April 8, 1995	003	9.0
Mae enjoys a position of power when a former boyfriend (Mars Callahan) visits and shows interest in Package Inc.
5	"Judgement Day"	Jay Sandrich	Susan Beavers	April 15, 1995	006	8.3
The staff is unhappy with newly instituted merit evaluations; meanwhile, Beth earns low marks on her household skills from Rita.
6	"My Guy"	Jay Sandrich	Ken Estin	Unaired	005	N/A
Rita mediates when Deborah and Natalie unwittingly date the same man.

== Reception ==
The Office was the fourth starring vehicle for Harper, following her previous television ventures in the sitcoms Rhoda (1974–78), Valerie (1986–87) and City (1990). However, the series did not catch on with the public and was cancelled after five episodes, with one episode remaining unaired. It was broadcast Saturday nights on CBS at 9:00 p.m. throughout its brief run.
