= House of Buggin' =

- Genre: Comedy
- Created by: David Bar Katz; John Leguizamo
- Starring: John Leguizamo; Jorge Luis Abreu; Tammi Cubilette; Yelba Osorio; David Herman; Luis Guzmán
- Country of origin: United States
- Original language: English
- No. of seasons: 1
- No. of episodes: 10

Production
- Running time: 30 minutes
- Production companies: Bregman/Baer Productions; HBO Independent Productions

Original release
- Network: Fox
- Release: January 8 – April 23, 1995

House of Buggin' was a Latino-themed sketch comedy television show which aired as a mid-season replacement from January to April 1995, starring John Leguizamo and Luis Guzmán. It was aired on the FOX Network, but removed from broadcasting schedules before the completion of the first season. According to Leguizamo's autobiography, the show was a replacement for In Living Color, using the same format, and was itself replaced by Mad TV.

== Broadcast history and ratings ==
The series primarily aired on Sundays on Fox. (Note: The Nielsen Ratings were retrieved from the Nielsen Media Research via USA Today, but have been archived online by ratingsryan.com)

Season	Episodes	Originally released		TV Season	Time	Rank
Season	Episodes	First released	Last released	TV Season	Time	Rank
1	10	January 8, 1995	April 23, 1995	1994–1995	Sunday 8:30 PM (1–8); Sunday 9:30 PM (10); Thursday 8:30 PM (9)	#95, 7.9 rating

== Episodes ==
No. in season	Title	Directed by	Written by	Original release date	Prod. code	US viewers (millions)
1	"Pilot"	Unknown	Unknown	January 8, 1995	9401	16.8
2	"West Side Story"	Unknown	Unknown	January 15, 1995	9404	16.6
3	"Job Interview with the Vampire"	Unknown	Unknown	January 22, 1995	9405	14.1
4	"Steve Mendoza: Reverse Psychologist"	Unknown	Unknown	February 12, 1995	9403	13.8
5	"Portrait of a Cockfighter"	Unknown	Unknown	February 19, 1995	9402	11.0
6	"Totally True Urban Legends"	Unknown	Unknown	February 26, 1995	9408	14.0
7	"Rapper Madness"	Unknown	Unknown	April 9, 1995	9409	7.7
8	"Institutional Gourmet"	Unknown	Unknown	April 16, 1995	9410	8.8
9	"The Hustler"	Unknown	Unknown	April 20, 1995	9407	9.4
10	"The Big Siblings of Flushing Queens"	Unknown	Unknown	April 23, 1995	9406	8.3

== Cancellation ==
By the end of the ten-episode season, ratings declined by 50% from the premiere episode. Fox suggested replacing the entire cast for the second season. Leguizamo refused, and the show was cancelled.
