= The Road Home (American TV series) =

- Series premiere print advertisement
- Genre: Family drama
- Created by: Bruce Paltrow; John Tinker
- Starring: Karen Allen; Terence Knox
- Country of origin: United States
- Original language: English
- No. of seasons: 1
- No. of episodes: 6

Production
- Executive producers: Bruce Paltrow; John Tinker
- Running time: 60 minutes
- Production companies: The Paltrow Group; CBS Productions

Original release
- Network: CBS
- Release: March 5 – April 16, 1994

The Road Home is an American family drama television series created by Bruce Paltrow and John Tinker. The series aired on CBS from March 5, 1994, to April 16, 1994. The series starred Karen Allen, Ed Flanders, Terence Knox, Frances Sternhagen, Jessica Bowman and Christopher Masterson. Just 6 episodes were produced. The series reunited Paltrow, Tinker, Flanders, and Knox, as they previously worked together on St. Elsewhere.

== Premise ==
The series focuses on Alison Matson and her family who returned home to North Carolina from Detroit to run her family's shrimp boat business.

== Cast ==
- Karen Allen as Alison Matson
- Terence Knox as Jack Matson
- Christopher Masterson as Sawyer Matson
- Jessica Bowman as Darcy Matson
- Gregory Perrelli as Calvin Matson
- Cecilley Carroll as Jinx Matson
- Ed Flanders as Walter Babineaux
- Frances Sternhagen as Charlotte Babineaux
- Bobby Fain as Arthur Dumas
- Alex McArthur as Dickie Babineaux

== Episodes ==
No.	Title	Directed by	Written by	Original release date
1	"Pilot"	Bruce Paltrow	John Tinker & Bruce Paltrow	March 5, 1994
2	"Cake Fear"	Tim Van Patten	John Tinker & Bruce Paltrow	March 12, 1994
3	"Look Back in Anger"	Tim Van Patten	Story by : John Tinker & Bruce Paltrow; Teleplay by : John Gregory Brown	March 19, 1994
4	"May I Cut In?"	Bruce Paltrow	Story by : John Tinker & Bruce Paltrow; Teleplay by : Lori Mozilo	March 26, 1994
5	"Whole in the Head"	Corey Allen	Story by : John Tinker & Bruce Paltrow; Teleplay by : Jason Katims	April 9, 1994
6	"Seven Year Pitch"	Unknown	Unknown	April 16, 1994
