= The Paula Poundstone Show =

- Genre: Variety show
- Starring: Paula Poundstone
- Country of origin: United States
- Original language: English
- No. of seasons: 1
- No. of episodes: 3 (1 unaired)

Production
- Camera setup: Multi-camera
- Running time: 60 minutes
- Production companies: ABC Productions; Burns & Burns

Original release
- Network: ABC
- Release: October 30 – November 6, 1993

The Paula Poundstone Show is an American variety show that aired on Saturday night from October 30, 1993 to November 6, 1993. The premiere episode aired at 10:00 pm before moving to 9:00 pm for its second episode. The second episode finished 96th in the Nielsen ratings. The show was canceled after airing its second episode.

== Premise ==
The show was a mix of topical comedy, music and audience participation.

== Episodes ==
No.	Title	Directed by	Written by	Original release date
1	"Episode One"	Art Wolff	Ken LaZebnik	October 30, 1993
Lily Tomlin is the guest. Paula uses Oreo cookies to explain TV ratings. She sends out a camera crew to find one of the Nielsen families, and she asks a group of economists questions while spinning in a teacup ride. Sam Donaldson reads Where the Wild Things Are in its entirety.
2	"Episode Two"	Unknown	Unknown	November 6, 1993
Carl Lewis, Sam Donaldson and Paul Simon are the guests. Paula travels to Boise, Idaho to talk to a movie theatre goer.
3	"Episode Three"	N/A	N/A	Unaired
Paula receives tips on auto maintenance, and she observes a group of penguins.
