= McKenna (TV series) =

American drama television series

- Genre: Drama
- Created by: Gil Grant
- Starring: Eric Close; Shawn Huff; Jennifer Love Hewitt; Rick Peters; Ashlee Lauren; Jacob Loyst; Jack Kehler; Chad Everett
- Composer: Bruce Rowland
- Country of origin: United States
- Original language: English
- No. of seasons: 1
- No. of episodes: 13 (8 unaired)

Production
- Executive producer: Gil Grant
- Running time: 60 minutes (with commercials)
- Production companies: GrantVision Productions; ABC Productions

Original release
- Network: ABC
- Release: September 15, 1994 – July 20, 1995

McKenna is an American drama television series that aired on ABC from September 15, 1994, to July 20, 1995. It starred Chad Everett and Jennifer Love Hewitt.

The series revolved around Brick McKenna (Eric Close), who returned to Oregon to take over his brother's business, McKenna Outfitters, after his death. He runs the business with help from his brother's widow, Leigh (Shawn Huff), and his father, Jack (Chad Everett). His sister, Cassidy "Cass" (Jennifer Love Hewitt), and his niece and nephew, Rose and Harry.

== Production ==
Although thirteen episodes were filmed, only five aired in the US. Three during September 1994, and the other two in July 1995. The series was broadcast in its entirety in Australia on the Nine Network (and its affiliate NBN Television).

The series was shot in and around Bend, Oregon.

Jennifer Love Hewitt was not cast until after the pilot episode was filmed. In the pilot, which aired as the first episode, her character was played by Vinessa Shaw.

== Cast ==
- Eric Close as Brick McKenna
- Shawn Huff as Leigh McKenna, Brick's sister-in-law and Rose & Harry's widowed mother
- Jennifer Love Hewitt as Cassidy "Cass" McKenna (role was played by Vinessa Shaw in the pilot), Brick's younger sister
- Rick Peters as Dale Goodwin
- Ashlee Lauren as Rose McKenna, Leigh's daughter and Brick's niece
- Jacob Loyst as Harry McKenna, Leigh's son and Brick's nephew
- Jack Kehler as Walter Maddock
- Chad Everett as Jack McKenna, Brick's widowed father
- Steve Buckley, stunt coordinator

== Episodes ==
No.	Title	Directed by	Written by	Original release date
1	"McKenna's Wonder"	Eric Laneuville	Gil Grant	September 15, 1994
2	"Splendor in the McKenna Grass"	Eric Laneuville	Gil Grant	September 22, 1994
3	"The Pony"	Kristoffer Tabori	Maryanne Melloan	September 29, 1994
4	"Racing in the Streets"	Kristoffer Tabori	Dennis Leoni	July 13, 1995
5	"Journey of Courage"	Eric Laneuville	Story by : Evan Katz & Stephen Zito and Richard Raskind; Teleplay by : Evan Katz & Stephen Zito	July 20, 1995
6	"The Pursuit"	TBD	TBD	Unaired
7	"Girl Gone"	TBD	TBD	Unaired
8	"The Hired Hand"	TBD	TBD	Unaired
9	"The Shooting"	TBD	TBD	Unaired
10	"The Trial"	TBD	TBD	Unaired
11	"The Bear"	TBD	TBD	Unaired
12	"Remember the Night?"	TBD	TBD	Unaired
13	"Same Time, Next Year"	TBD	TBD	Unaired
