= The Wright Verdicts =

- Genre: Drama
- Created by: Dick Wolf
- Starring: Tom Conti; Margaret Colin; Aida Turturro
- Composer: Mike Post
- Country of origin: United States
- Original language: English
- No. of seasons: 1
- No. of episodes: 13 (7 unaired)

Production
- Executive producer: Dick Wolf
- Producers: Arthur W. Forney; Peter R. McIntosh
- Running time: 42 minutes
- Production companies: Wolf Films; Universal Television

Original release
- Network: CBS
- Release: March 31 – June 11, 1995

The Wright Verdicts is an American drama television series created by Dick Wolf. The series stars Tom Conti, Margaret Colin and Aida Turturro. The series aired on CBS from March 31, 1995, to June 11, 1995.

== Cast ==
- Tom Conti as Charles Wright
- Margaret Colin as Sandy Hamor
- Aida Turturro as Lydia

== Episodes ==
No.	Title	Directed by	Written by	Original release date	Prod. code
1	"Pilot"	John Patterson	Dick Wolf	March 31, 1995	83585
2	"Ex-Corpus Delicti"	James A. Contner	Larry Moskowitz	April 7, 1995	70204
3	"Special Prosecutor"	Frederick King Keller	Barry M. Schkolnick	April 14, 1995	70203
4	"Sins of the Father"	Frederick King Keller	Mark St. Germain	April 23, 1995	70202
5	"The Eyes of God"	Martha Mitchell	Mark St. Germain	June 4, 1995	70205
6	"Family Matters"	Unknown	Unknown	June 11, 1995	70207
7	"Unlucky Star"	Martha Mitchell	Garth Twa	Unaired	70201
8	"Dear Lloyd"	TBD	TBD	Unaired	70210
9	"Fallen Angels"	TBD	TBD	Unaired	70211
10	"Pride"	TBD	TBD	Unaired	70212
11	"Jewish"	TBD	TBD	Unaired	70213
12	"Joy"	TBD	TBD	Unaired	70214
13	"Heaven"	TBD	TBD	Unaired	70215
