= Now with Tom Brokaw and Katie Couric =

American news magazine program (1993-1994)

Now with Tom Brokaw and Katie Couric, shortened to Now, is an American news magazine that aired on NBC from 1993 to 1994. It was hosted by Tom Brokaw and Katie Couric. The show was eventually merged into Dateline NBC.
