= Under Suspicion (TV series) =

1990s television series

- Genre: Police drama
- Created by: Jacqueline Zambrano
- Starring: Karen Sillas; Philip Casnoff; Paul McCrane; Seymour Cassel
- Composer: Joseph Vitarelli
- Country of origin: United States
- Original language: English
- No. of seasons: 1
- No. of episodes: 18

Production
- Executive producers: Robert Lieberman; Jacqueline Zambrano
- Producer: Marjorie David
- Production location: Portland, Oregon
- Editors: Michael B. Hoggan; James Galloway; Alan L. Shefland
- Running time: 60 minutes (with commercials)
- Production companies: Magdalene Productions; Lakeside Productions; Warner Bros. Television

Original release
- Network: CBS
- Release: September 16, 1994 – March 10, 1995

Under Suspicion is an American police drama television series set in Portland, Oregon. It was created by Jacqueline Zambrano. Its episodes were broadcast on the CBS network from September 16, 1994, to March 10, 1995. Though short-lived, the show premiered to fairly strong reviews, which praised lead Karen Sillas's performance and observed that the show functioned as a kind of Americanized Prime Suspect.

Filming occurred in Portland, with views of the South Park Blocks and Willamette River.

The show is rated M in New Zealand for violence, sexual references and offensive language.

== Cast ==
The show stars Karen Sillas as Detective Rose "Phil" Phillips, the only female detective in a male-dominated police squad.

The supporting cast includes Philip Casnoff as Internal Affairs Sergeant Jimmy Vitelli, veteran character actor Seymour Cassel (star of Faces and Minnie and Moskowitz) as Captain Mickey Schwartz, Ray Baker (Hard Rain) as Chief DeSort, Paul McCrane as Detective Clarke, Michael Beach as Detective Desmond Beck, Doug Baldwin as coroner Leon Hart, and Arabella Field as Patsi Moosekian.

== Plot ==
The harsh realities of discrimination are always apparent to Detective Rose "Phil" Phillips. In addition to coping with the daily pressures of being a detective, she must break down the barrier of crude sexist comments made by her fellow cops and force them to see her as an equal.

Sexy, tough and a good cop, Phil confronts her own feelings about being a woman in a man's world when she finds herself attracted to Sergeant Jimmy Vitelli of Internal Affairs, a handsome, arrogant cop on the rise.

Phil's determination, crime-solving skills and feminine perspective make her a detective, but she'll always be Under Suspicion as she struggles to prove that she's just "one of the boys."

== Episodes ==
No.	Title	Directed by	Written by	Original release date	Prod. code
1	"Pilot"	Robert Lieberman	Jacqueline Zambrano	September 16, 1994	291051
2	"Serial Killer: Part 1"	Vern Gillum	Lynn Mamet	September 23, 1994	291052
3	"Serial Killer: Part 2"	Vern Gillum	Lynn Mamet	September 30, 1994	291053
4	"Child Molester: Part 1"	Vern Gillum	Steven Phillip Smith	October 7, 1994	291054
5	"Child Molester: Part 2"	James Contner	Laurence Frank	October 14, 1994	291055
6	"Wife Abuse/Murder: Part 1"	Vern Gillum	Don Carlos Dunaway	October 28, 1994	291056
7	"Wife Abuse/Murder: Part 2"	James Quinn	Don Carlos Dunaway	November 4, 1994	291057
8	"Arson/Murder Story"	James Quinn	Don Carlos Dunaway	November 11, 1994	291058
9	"The Retarded Witness"	Michael Watkins	Gerry Conway	November 18, 1994	291059
10	"Father/Daughter Murder"	Vern Gillum	Laurence Frank	December 1, 1994	291060
11	"Sex Harassment/Corruption Case"	Michael Watkins	Anne Kenney	January 6, 1995	291061
12	"Koreatown Murder"	James Quinn	Rose Schacht & Ann Powell	January 13, 1995	291062
13	"Holy Suspect"	Kenneth Fink	Gerry Conway	January 20, 1995	291063
14	"A Haunting Case"	Vern Gillum	Marjorie David	January 27, 1995	291064
15	"Hostage Standoff"	Michael Watkins	Anne Kenney	February 3, 1995	291065
16	"Kinky Murder"	Dean Parisot	David Latt	February 24, 1995	291066
17	"Cop Killing"	James Quinn	Jacqueline Zambrano & Anne Kenney	March 3, 1995	291067
18	"Wrongful Shooting"	James Quinn	Jacqueline Zambrano	March 10, 1995	291068
