= ABC Saturday Movie of the Week =

American television series

- Genre: Film presentation
- Country of origin: United States
- Original language: English
- No. of seasons: 12
- No. of episodes: 178

Production
- Running time: 120–300 minutes (with commercials)

Original release
- Network: ABC
- Release: February 21, 2004 – present

Related
- Wonderful World of Disney

ABC Saturday Movie of the Week is the umbrella title of a weekly American film series that airs on ABC. The series began as the replacement for ABC's Big Picture Show and as a revival of ABC's Movie of the Week theme (the network used this theme from 1969 until 1976). Since its inception, it has been ABC's main platform for airing theatrical movies, although other movies air as part of the movie of the week format during the holiday season and as special presentations. Other presentations of Disney's animated films are placed under Wonderful World of Disney as an umbrella title.

== Overview ==
Beginning in 2009, with the December 2008 cancellation of Wonderful World of Disney as a regular series, ABC Saturday Movie of the Week has become ABC's main platform for all movies. Currently the title is used solely for internal scheduling purposes; either a short promotional piece listing the film coming up or a direct cut to a disclaimer that the film has been formatted to broadcast television presentation precedes the aired film, along with noting time stretching done with extra commercial breaks and "bonus content" to fill out the three-hour timeslot. The use of the second audio program also varies wildly, with some weeks featuring the film's Spanish language dub, and others with a Descriptive Video Service track.

Among the films which ABC had broadcast rights to are a package of DreamWorks films, which have since passed to NBC after Comcast's purchase of DreamWorks. The two lone permanent annual airings of any film in the series are those of The Ten Commandments, which has aired on ABC since 1973 and airs in an extended time slot each year on a Saturday before Easter (except 2020, 2022, 2023, and 2025 when the movie aired on a Saturday before Palm Sunday), and The Sound of Music, which has aired on ABC since 2002, and traditionally airs on a Sunday before Christmas (except 2026 when the movie aired on the Sunday following Thanksgiving). The Ten Commandments is also generally the most watched film of the series each year.

Generally, since the premiere of Saturday Night Football in 2006 and the major decline of new programming on all broadcast networks on Saturday nights, along with other factors such as networks ending their purchase of all but the most high-profile of films and the rise of streaming options, ABC's Saturday movie schedule is mainly only used to fill weeks where ABC has no sports or news programming to fill the timeslot. Saturday Night Football generally airs from September to mid-December and holiday specials in December, with NBA Saturday Primetime on ABC airing from mid-January until May into the NBA playoffs, the NHL's Stanley Cup playoffs, and encore episodes of other ABC series and re-compilation episodes of 20/20 filling other Saturday nights.
