= Amazing Grace (American TV series) =

American drama television series

- Genre: Drama
- Created by: Deborah Jones
- Starring: Patty Duke; Joe Spano; Lorraine Toussaint; Robin Gammell; Marguerite Moreau; Justin Garms; Gavin Harrison; Dan Lauria
- Composer: Ray Bunch
- Country of origin: United States
- Original language: English
- No. of seasons: 1
- No. of episodes: 5

Production
- Executive producers: Jonathan Estrin; Shelley List
- Producers: Joe Viola; Brooke Kennedy
- Running time: 42 minutes
- Production companies: List/Estrin Productions; Ma Pearce Productions; NBC Productions

Original release
- Network: NBC
- Release: April 1 – September 16, 1995

Amazing Grace is an American drama television series created by Deborah Jones. The series stars Patty Duke, Joe Spano, Lorraine Toussaint, Robin Gammell, Marguerite Moreau, Justin Garms, Gavin Harrison and Dan Lauria. The series aired on NBC from April 1, 1995, to September 16, 1995. Shot on location in Duke's adopted hometown of Coeur d'Alene, Idaho, the series featured Duke as a newly ordained minister who had experienced addiction to painkillers.

== Cast ==
- Patty Duke as Hannah Miller
- Joe Spano as Detective Dominick Corso
- Lorraine Toussaint as Yvonne Price
- Robin Gammell as Arthur Sutherland
- Marguerite Moreau as Jenny Miller
- Justin Garms as Brian Miller
- Gavin Harrison as Link
- Dan Lauria as Harry Kramer

== Episodes ==
No.	Title	Directed by	Written by	Original release date
1	"The Fugitive"	Unknown	Unknown	April 1, 1995
2	"Hallelujah"	Arthur Allan Seidelman	Sharon Elizabeth Doyle	April 8, 1995
3	"The Shooting"	Unknown	Unknown	April 15, 1995
4	"Family Values"	Unknown	Unknown	April 22, 1995
5	"Remember When"	Unknown	Unknown	September 16, 1995
