= Traps (TV series) =

- Created by: Stephen J. Cannell
- Starring: George C. Scott; Dan Cortese; Bill Nunn; Piper Laurie; Lindsay Crouse
- Composer: Mike Post
- Country of origin: United States
- Original language: English
- No. of seasons: 1
- No. of episodes: 6 (1 unaired)

Production
- Running time: 60 minutes
- Production companies: Stephen J. Cannell Productions; CBS Entertainment Productions

Original release
- Network: CBS
- Release: March 31 – April 27, 1994

Traps is an American police drama that aired on CBS from March 31 to April 27, 1994. The series was created by Stephen J. Cannell and produced by Stephen J. Cannell Productions in association with CBS Entertainment Productions.

== Premise ==
Joe Trapchek was a retired chief of police in Seattle, Washington who came out of retirement to consult on cases. Also seen were Detective Chris Trapchek, Joe's grandson, and Detective Jack Cloud, Chris's partner and the ex-partner of Chris's father who was killed in the line of duty.

== Cast ==
- George C. Scott as Joe Trapchek
- Dan Cortese as Detective Chris Trapchek
- Bill Nunn as Detective Jack Cloud
- Piper Laurie as Cora Trapchek
- Lindsay Crouse as Laura Parkhurst

== Episodes ==
| No. | Title | Directed by | Written by | Original release date |
|---|---|---|---|---|
| 1 | "The 24/24 Hour Rule" | Rob Bowman | Stephen J. Cannell | March 31, 1994 |
| 2 | "Retirement Party" | Unknown | Unknown | April 7, 1994 |
| 3 | "White Center" | Unknown | Unknown | April 14, 1994 |
| 4 | "Triage" | Unknown | Unknown | April 21, 1994 |
| 5 | "The Empty Kitchen" | Unknown | Unknown | April 27, 1994 |
| 6 | "The Devil's Tools" | TBD | TBD | UNAIRED |

== Bibliography ==
- Tim Brooks and Earle Marsh, The Complete Directory to Prime Time Network and Cable TV Shows 1946–Present, Ninth edition (New York: Ballantine Books, 2007) ISBN 978-0-345-49773-4
