= The Boys Are Back (TV series) =

- Genre: Sitcom
- Created by: Matthew Carlson
- Written by: Linwood Boomer; Matthew Carlson; Gary Murphy; Neil Thompson
- Directed by: Will Mackenzie
- Starring: Hal Linden; Suzanne Pleshette; George Newbern; Kevin Crowley; Bess Meyer; Ryan O'Donohue; Kelsey Mulrooney; Justin Cooper
- Composer: Jonathan Wolff
- Country of origin: United States
- Original language: English
- No. of seasons: 1
- No. of episodes: 18 (2 unaired)

Production
- Camera setup: Multi-camera
- Running time: 30 minutes
- Production companies: Vanity Logo Productions; ABC Productions

Original release
- Network: CBS
- Release: September 11, 1994 – January 28, 1995

The Boys Are Back is an American sitcom television series created by Matthew Carlson that was aired on CBS from September 11, 1994, to January 28, 1995. It stars Suzanne Pleshette and Hal Linden as parents Jackie and Fred Hansen. The show was broadcast on Wednesdays at 8 p.m. Eastern time.

== Cast ==
- Hal Linden as Fred Hansen
- Suzanne Pleshette as Jackie Hansen, Fred's wife
- George Newbern as Mike Hansen, Fred and Jackie's younger son
- Kevin Crowley as Rick Hansen, Fred and Jackie's older son
- Bess Meyer as Judy Hansen, Mike's wife
- Ryan O'Donohue as Peter Hansen, Rick's son
- Kelsey Mulrooney as Sarah Hansen, Mike and Judy's daughter
- Justin Cooper as Nicky Hansen, Mike and Judy's son

== Episodes ==
No.	Title	Directed by	Written by	Original release date	Viewers (millions)
1	"Pilot"	James Burrows	Matthew Carlson	September 11, 1994	18.5
2	"The First Day"	Will Mackenzie	Matthew Carlson	September 14, 1994	14.2
3	"Punch and Judy"	Unknown	Unknown	September 21, 1994	14.2
4	"Don't Tell Mom the Babysitters Rick"	Unknown	Unknown	September 28, 1994	13.6
5	"Mikey at Nike"	Will Mackenzie	Matthew Carlson	October 12, 1994	12.1
6	"The Good, the Bad and the Hansens"	Will Mackenzie	Linwood Boomer	October 19, 1994	11.4
7	"The Fishing Trip"	Will Mackenzie	Linwood Boomer	October 26, 1994	12.1
8	"The Favorite"	Unknown	Unknown	November 2, 1994	12.5
9	"Thanksgiving"	Will Mackenzie	Matthew Carlson	November 16, 1994	14.6
10	"A Tree Dies in Portland"	Will Mackenzie	Ron Darian	November 30, 1994	13.3
11	"The Christmas Snow"	Unknown	Unknown	December 14, 1994	10.4
12	"Fred Runs Away"	Will Mackenzie	Tom Reeder	December 21, 1994	11.2
13	"Get Me to the Church"	Will Mackenzie	Gary Murphy & Neil Thompson	January 7, 1995	12.3
14	"Bad Hair Day"	Unknown	Unknown	January 14, 1995	12.8
15	"Searching for Sarah Hansen"	Unknown	Unknown	January 21, 1995	10.5
16	"The French Class"	Will Mackenzie	Gary Murphy & Neil Thompson	January 28, 1995	11.6
17	"Where There's a Will, There's a Melee"	N/A	N/A	Unaired	N/A
18	"Rick and Judy End Up in a Seedy Motel Room"	N/A	N/A	Unaired	N/A
