= The Martin Short Show (1994 TV series) =

- Genre: Sitcom
- Created by: Martin Short; Paul Flaherty; Michael Short
- Directed by: Eugene Levy
- Starring: Martin Short; Jan Hooks; Noley Thornton; Zack Duhame; Andrea Martin; Brian Doyle-Murray
- Composer: Ed Alton
- Country of origin: United States
- Original language: English
- No. of seasons: 1
- No. of episodes: 13 (10 unaired)

Production
- Executive producer: Martin Short
- Camera setup: Multi-camera
- Running time: 30 minutes
- Production companies: Dolshor Productions; NBC Productions

Original release
- Network: NBC
- Release: September 15 – September 27, 1994

The Martin Short Show is an American sitcom television series created by Paul Flaherty, Michael Short, and star Martin Short, that aired on NBC from September 15 until September 27, 1994 on NBC, only three episodes of thirteen.

The Show Formerly Known as The Martin Short Show, a 90-minute special, aired 20 May 1995 on NBC, in Saturday Night Live's time slot as a summer replacement.

== Overview ==
The series focuses on Marty Short, a comedian who tries to balance his work life as a sketch show host, and his home life with his wife and children.

== Cast ==
- Martin Short - Marty Short
- Jan Hooks - Meg Harper Short
- Noley Thornton - Caroline Short
- Zack Duhame - Charlie Short
- Andrea Martin - Alice Manoogan
- Brian Doyle-Murray - Gary

== Episodes ==
No.	Title	Directed by	Written by	Original release date	Viewers (millions)
1	"Who's Afraid of Snowball Fortensky?"	John Whitesell	Paul Flaherty & Martin Short	September 15, 1994	20.8
2	"The Steve Martin Show"	Eugene Levy	Dick Blasucci & Martin Short	September 20, 1994	17.7
3	"A Hippo Never Forgets"	Eugene Levy	Howard Bendetson & Cindy Begel	September 27, 1994	16.1
4	"The Joker is Me"	Eugene Levy	Frank Mula	Unaired	N/A
5	"Me, the Jury"	Eugene Levy	Doug Steckler	Unaired	N/A
6	"Mommie-in-Law Dearest"	N/A	N/A	Unaired	N/A
7	"The Mother of All Blind Dates"	N/A	N/A	Unaired	N/A
8	"Movie of the Weak"	N/A	N/A	Unaired	N/A
9	"Alice's Date"	N/A	N/A	Unaired	N/A
10	"The Double Dare"	N/A	N/A	Unaired	N/A
11	"Marty See Marty Do"	N/A	N/A	Unaired	N/A
12	"Marty's Dance Break"	N/A	N/A	Unaired	N/A
13	"Gary's Big Strike"	N/A	N/A	Unaired	N/A

== Production ==
In an un-aired pilot, Dody Goodman plays Olive, Marty's mother-in-law, and Kristen Johnston plays a TV show production supervisor with a New York accent.
