= Turning Point (TV program) =

- Presented by: Diane Sawyer; Forrest Sawyer; Meredith Vieira; Peter Jennings; Barbara Walters; Charles Gibson
- Theme music composer: Bill Conti
- Country of origin: United States

Production
- Executive producers: Roone Arledge; Phyllis McGrady
- Running time: 60 minutes
- Production company: ABC News

Original release
- Network: ABC
- Release: March 9, 1994 – June 17, 1999

Turning Point is an ABC News program that aired from 1994 to 1999.

Turning Point was an hour-long documentary program focused on a single topic, making it similar to CBS' 48 Hours, which it ran directly opposite for some of its run. The program tended toward sensational topics, such as former members of Charles Manson's "Family" and much coverage of the O. J. Simpson murder case, which was current for much of the program's run. ABC News figures appearing regularly on the program included Diane Sawyer, Forrest Sawyer, Meredith Vieira, Peter Jennings and Barbara Walters.

This Turning Point is not to be confused with an ABC dramatic anthology series of the same title which ran during the 1952-53 television season.
