= Eye to Eye with Connie Chung =

- Presented by: Connie Chung
- Country of origin: United States
- Original language: English

Production
- Running time: 60 minutes

Original release
- Network: CBS

Eye to Eye With Connie Chung is an American news show that aired on CBS from 1993 to 1995. The show, hosted by Connie Chung as a second project from her time as co-anchoring the CBS Evening News with Dan Rather, she hosted and would often report, either on individual stories or doing interviews. The series typically ran about 4 or 5 stories in each one-hour installment.

== Kit Gingrich controversy ==
The show caused a great deal of controversy in early 1995 when Chung was interviewing then-Speaker of the House Newt Gingrich's mother, Kathleen. Chung asked her what her son thought of then-First Lady Hillary Clinton, and, when Kathleen said she couldn't answer, Connie said she could whisper, and it could be between them. Subsequently, Ms. Gingrich's microphone volume was turned up, and her reply was "she's a bitch", which sparked instant attention. Congressman Gingrich complained publicly, saying the network "took advantage" of his mother. The unwanted publicity to both Chung and CBS News contributed to Chung being dropped as co-anchor of the Evening News in May 1995, which prompted her to leave the network altogether. Eye to Eye would continue airing until that August, although "with Connie Chung" was dropped from the title.

== Correspondents ==
When Chung herself was not reporting or interviewing, the program's other stories were reported on by one of five correspondents. The correspondents were:

- Bernard Goldberg
- Edie Magnus
- Russ Mitchell
- Roberta Baskin
- Bill Lagattuta
