= Marker (TV series) =

American drama television series

- Genre: Drama
- Created by: Stephen J. Cannell
- Starring: Richard Grieco; Gates McFadden; Andy Bumatail
- Composer: Mark Spiro
- Country of origin: United States
- Original language: English
- No. of seasons: 1
- No. of episodes: 13

Production
- Executive producers: Philip DeGuere; Jerald J. Silverhardt
- Running time: 60 minutes
- Production companies: Stephen J. Cannell Productions; Paramount Television

Original release
- Network: UPN
- Release: January 17 – May 16, 1995

Marker is an American drama television series that premiered on UPN on January 17 and ended on May 16, 1995. It is set in and was filmed in Hawaii.

== Synopsis ==
The series' plot is about Richard DeMorra (played by Richard Grieco), a carpenter who travels to Hawaii to claim the estate of his estranged father after his father's death. Most of the father's estate was instead willed to his widow, Kimba (Gates McFadden). To claim his share of the estate, DeMorra must travel and redeem "markers": tokens distributed by his father which correspond to good deeds. Many of these good deeds correspond to detective work, such as in the first episode, where DeMorra is asked to locate a surfer's missing sister.

== Cast ==
- Richard Grieco as Richard DeMorra
- Gates McFadden as Kimba
- Andy Bumatai as Danny Kahala

== Episodes ==
No.	Title	Directed by	Written by	Original release date
1	"Pilot"	Dennis Dugan	Stephen J. Cannell	January 17, 1995
2	"Frank & Mike's"	David Hemmings	Philip DeGuere	January 24, 1995
3	"Cloud Warriors"	John Nicolella	Stephen J. Cannell	January 31, 1995
4	"High & Wild"	Guy Magar	Craig Volk	February 7, 1995
5	"Spanish Laughter"	David Hemmings	Philip DeGuere	February 14, 1995
6	"From Russia Without Love"	George Mendeluk	Craig Volk	February 21, 1995
7	"Spiked Through the Heart"	David Hemmings	Steven Phillip Smith	February 28, 1995
8	"Dead Man's Marker"	Kristoffer Tabori	Steven Phillip Smith	March 14, 1995
9	"The Pink Unicorn"	David Hemmings	Gordon Dawson	March 28, 1995
10	"Truth, Lies and Rock 'n' Roll"	Brad Turner	Erica Byrne	April 25, 1995
11	"Snowballs in Hawaii"	Kristoffer Tabori	Stephen J. Cannell	May 2, 1995
12	"Factor X"	Andrew Stevens	Philip DeGuere	May 9, 1995
13	"Discovery"	Sara Jane Rose	Martin Roth	May 16, 1995
