= Day One (TV program) =

American television news magazine program

Day One is a television news magazine produced by ABC News from 1993 to 1995, hosted by Forrest Sawyer and Diane Sawyer.

One of its stories, titled "Smoke Screen", was an important report on the cigarette industry's manipulation of nicotine during the manufacturing process. The piece won a George Polk award, but also led to a lawsuit from Philip Morris that ended with a settlement and apology from ABC.

The series also won a Peabody Award for its 1993 investigation titled "Scarred for Life" on female genital cutting.
