= 1994 in American television =

In 1994, television in the United States saw a number of significant events, including the debuts, finales, and cancellations of television shows; the launch, closure, and rebranding of channels; changes and additions to network affiliations by stations; controversies, business transactions, and carriage disputes; and the deaths of individuals who had made notable contributions to the medium.

== Notable events ==
=== January ===
Date	Event
18	The Peanuts special You're in the Super Bowl, Charlie Brown is broadcast by NBC. It will prove to be the last new Peanuts special broadcast on television for eight years until A Charlie Brown Valentine airs on ABC. It was the last special in creator Charles Schulz's lifetime to air on television and the gang's first appearance on NBC in over 25 years.
18	CBS wins the rights to broadcast the 1998 Winter Olympics from Nagano, Japan, after paying roughly $375 million.
22	NBC broadcasts the NHL All-Star Game for the fifth consecutive year. This would also mark the last time that NBC would broadcast a National Hockey League game for 12 years.
23	CBS, which had broadcast National Football League games since 1956, broadcasts its final NFL telecast after 38 years, with the Dallas Cowboys defeating the San Francisco 49ers in the NFC Championship Game, 38–21. CBS had been outbid during December 1993 for rights to the NFC package by the Fox Network. CBS, however, would eventually regain NFL rights (taking over the AFC rights from NBC) in 1998.
24	During a segment on NBC's Today, host Bryant Gumbel asks "What is the internet, anyway?"
30	NBC airs the Super Bowl for the second consecutive year. It's the first time that a network has aired two straight Super Bowls outright. While CBS did air the first two Super Bowls back to back, the first ever Super Bowl was actually a simulcast between CBS and NBC.
31	Bill Cosby returns to NBC for a two-hour movie, The Cosby Mysteries, after ending production of The Cosby Show 21 months earlier.

=== February ===
Date	Event
1	American pay television channel Encore launches seven new themed multiplex channels (Westerns, True Stories, Love Stories, WAM!: America's Kidz Network, Action and Mystery), primarily on TCI cable systems, becoming the first premium service to offer a suite of thematic channels. Starz, which features more recent movie fare than its parent channel, also debuts on this date as part of the Encore multiplex and would eventually become a rival to HBO, Showtime, Cinemax and The Movie Channel.
12	KTSP-TV in Phoenix changes its call letters to KSAZ-TV, reflecting its newly adopted "Spirit of Arizona" slogan.
19	During the opening monologue on Saturday Night Live, guest host Martin Lawrence makes sexually explicit jokes about female genitalia and feminine hygiene, which results in NBC banning him from appearing on the network (for the next year) and SNL (for life). In repeats of the episode, the offending section of the monologue is replaced by a title card read by an off-screen player (writer Jim Downey), saying that although SNL is neutral about the issues mentioned by Lawrence, network policy prevents his remarks from being re-broadcast, and that the incident almost cost the entire cast of SNL their jobs.
21	Sony Pictures Entertainment merged Columbia Pictures Television and TriStar Television into Columbia TriStar Television. Two of the Sony owned game shows (Wheel of Fortune and Jeopardy!) will be produced by the new unit for Sony's then-new future programs. CPT and TriStar Television are still in-active until 1999 and the beginning of 2001, respectively.
23	CBS's coverage of the short program in women's figure skating at the Winter Olympics in Lillehammer, Norway (fueled by the media coverage from a scandal in which associates of figure skater Tonya Harding attacked Nancy Kerrigan) immediately becomes one of the highest rated prime time television programs in American history.
25	Bob Costas hosts his final episode of Later on NBC with a one-hour retrospective titled "One Last Time".
28	Greg Kinnear debuts as host of NBC's Later.

=== March ===
Date	Event
1	The Pay television content advisory system, which describe the varying degrees of suggestive or explicit content in series and movies being broadcast by pay cable channels, are first implemented by HBO, Cinemax, Showtime and The Movie Channel. A streamlined version of the system—a categorized, ten-point system of content labels and abbreviated codes—was implemented on June 10.
11	Viacom assumes control of Paramount Pictures, which includes Paramount Television. Later during the year Paramount/Viacom announces plans to initiate a new over-the-air television network, in conjunction with United Television. The new network, the United Paramount Network (or UPN for short), is initiated during January 1995.
15	Major League Soccer with ESPN and ABC Sports announced the league's first television rights deal without any players, coaches, or teams in place. The three-year agreement committed 10 games on ESPN, 25 on ESPN2, and the MLS Cup on ABC. The deal gave MLS no rights fees but split advertising revenue between the league and networks.
31	Madonna appears on CBS's Late Show with David Letterman and makes headlines for going on a profanity-laden tirade—one of the most censored events of American talk-show history, swearing 13 times during the interview. Though infamous, it results in some of the highest ratings of Letterman's late-night career. (Robin Williams would later describe the segment as a "battle of wits with an unarmed woman.")

=== April ===
Date	Event
3	After 15 years, Charles Kuralt hosts CBS News Sunday Morning for the final time. He would be succeeded by Charles Osgood.
6	On the ESPN2 talk show Talk2 former Los Angeles Rams quarterback Jim Everett flips the table and attacks host Jim Rome in retaliation for Rome repeatedly calling Everett "Chris" in relation to female tennis player Chris Evert.
10	Pat Summerall makes his final assignment and on-camera appearance as a broadcaster for CBS Sports, the final round of the Masters.
14	Turner Classic Movies, an extension of Turner Broadcasting System, debuted on the 100th anniversary of the first public movie showing in New York City.
17	ABC affiliate KARD in Monroe, Louisiana, which carried Fox on a secondary basis, switches to be a primary Fox affiliate.
18	Arsenio Hall announces that he won't continue his late night talk show, with the final episode of The Arsenio Hall Show ultimately airing on May 27, 1994.
27	Major networks cover the state funeral of Richard Nixon.
28	The Simpsons broadcasts its 100th episode on Fox.

=== May ===
Date	Event
13	Johnny Carson makes a surprise appearance on the Late Show with David Letterman to deliver Letterman his "Top Ten Lists". This would prove to be Carson's final television appearance.
14	Phil Hartman along with Melanie Hutsell, Rob Schneider, Sarah Silverman, and Julia Sweeney appear in their final Saturday Night Live episode as cast members. Hartman is presented with a bronzed stick of glue, symbolizing how he had become "The Glue" of the show, a term coined by Adam Sandler.
23	New World Communications reaches a multi-year affiliation agreement with Fox among their entire station group, seven of which were in the former Storer Broadcasting chain, along with four stations purchased from Argyle Television and four stations from Citicasters. In turn, Fox parent News Corporation purchased a 20 percent stake in New World. The terms of the agreement calls for all stations to switch to Fox after their existing contracts are up, initiating a wide-ranging realignment of television stations and network affiliations.
23	Star Trek: The Next Generation concludes its seven-year run with the series finale, "All Good Things..." The two-hour finale was broadcast at 6 p.m. on most affiliates, rather than as part of the prime time lineup.
25	Shannen Doherty makes her final appearance as Brenda Walsh on Fox's Beverly Hills, 90210.
27	Airing in syndication, Ray Combs hosts his final episode of Family Feud. Combs' last taping session would see him abruptly leave the stage at its conclusion and leave the studio without acknowledging anyone on his way out.

=== June ===
Date	Event
11	World Wrestling Federation wrestler Hulk Hogan signs a deal with World Championship Wrestling on a live broadcast of WCW Saturday Night on TBS.
16	ABC and Scripps-Howard Broadcasting confirm a wide-ranging affiliation pact securing the network's links with WXYZ-TV in Detroit and WEWS-TV in Cleveland. At Scripps-Howard's insistence, it also calls for KNXV-TV in Phoenix, WFTS-TV in St. Petersburg/Tampa (both outgoing Fox affiliates) and WMAR-TV in Baltimore (the market's NBC affiliate) to switch to ABC. The deal comes at the expense of KTVK and WJZ-TV, whose long tenures with ABC spanned 40 years and 47 years, respectively.
17	Former NFL player O. J. Simpson, suspected in the murder of his former wife and her acquaintance, flees from police with his friend Al Cowlings in his white Ford Bronco; the low-speed chase ends with Simpson's surrender to police at his Brentwood mansion. All of the big three television networks are providing live coverage of the events, with ABC breaking away from 20/20, and CBS preempting a rerun of the Picket Fences episode "Remote Control", while NBC, who was broadcasting Game 5 of the NBA Finals between New York and Houston in the meantime, periodically covers the chase via a split-screen.
17	DirecTV, a direct broadcast satellite service, begins broadcasting in Jackson, Mississippi.
19	The World Wrestling Federation holds the second annual King of the Ring event on pay-per-view. The event in particular, is remembered among fans for featuring former National Football League player Art Donovan on commentary. Donovan seemingly had no familiarity with professional wrestling, and repeatedly asked the same questions throughout the event, notably, "How much does this guy weigh?"
20	NBC's Today moves into Studio 1A at Rockefeller Center.
23	The first ever Nurses Ball event airs on the ABC soap opera General Hospital.

=== July ===
Date	Event
9	British vintage puppet action series Thunderbirds is introduced to the United States when the series goes to air on Fox Kids on Saturday mornings with brand new music and voices.
11	PBS repackages their existing children's programs as a new block called PTV.
12	The 1994 Major League Baseball All-Star Game from Pittsburgh is broadcast on NBC (NBC's first Major League Baseball telecast since Game 5 of the 1989 National League Championship Series). The game is the first production of The Baseball Network, a joint venture between MLB, NBC, and ABC. Hampered by its much-criticized regional policy for game broadcasts and a players' strike that cancels the 1994 postseason, the venture will be termed a failure even before it dissolves at the end of the 1995 season.
14	Westinghouse Broadcasting agrees to affiliate all of their television stations with CBS, including long-tenured NBC affiliates WBZ-TV in Boston and KYW-TV in Philadelphia, along with outgoing ABC affiliate WJZ-TV in Baltimore. This deal consequently prompts CBS to sell WCAU-TV, owned by the network since 1957, and precipitated Westinghouse's outright buyout of CBS the following year.
16	Baseball Night in America premieres on ABC. This would mark the first time that Major League Baseball games would be broadcast on ABC since the 1989 World Series.

=== August ===
Date	Event
11	Tony Kubek makes what turns out to be his final Major League Baseball broadcast, which was a game between the New York Yankees and Toronto Blue Jays from Yankee Stadium for MSG Network. This also proved to be the final day of the 1994 Major League Baseball season due to a looming players' strike. Kubek soon retired from broadcasting altogether. and would later claim that he never watched another Major League Baseball game since.
12	The ABC soap opera All My Children broadcasts a memorial episode for original cast member Frances Heflin, who died during June. The memorial is in the form of a funeral service for Heflin's character, Mona Kane Tyler.
12	Fox broadcasts its first National Football League event, a pre-season game in San Francisco between the 49ers and Denver Broncos.
21	HBO broadcasts a concert appearance by Barbra Streisand, the entertainer's first public concert in 27 years.
29	Highlights from the NWA World Title Tournament from two days prior air on ECW Hardcore TV. It was at that particular event that the tournament winner, Shane Douglas threw down the NWA World Heavyweight Championship belt and proclaimed the ECW Heavyweight Championship to be a world championship. Douglas' speech presaged the emergence of ECW - renamed from Eastern Championship Wrestling to Extreme Championship Wrestling shortly after the event - as a nationally recognized promotion and the continued decline in the power and profile of the NWA.

=== September ===
Date	Event
3	WJW-TV in Cleveland is the first of the New World Communications stations to switch to Fox, ending a 40-year affiliation with CBS. Former Fox affiliate WOIO, in turn, joins CBS and takes over operations of independent WUAB (owned by Cannell Communications) via a local marketing agreement; this allows for WOIO to set up a news department using WUAB's personnel.
3	The made-for-television film Scooby-Doo! in Arabian Nights premieres in syndication. The film is notable for being the last film or television series in which Don Messick voices Scooby-Doo and Boo-Boo Bear before his retirement in 1996 (though he would voice Scooby-Doo one more time in the Scooby-Doo Mystery video game), and the last in which Allan Melvin voices Magilla Gorilla (as well as his last film role overall). It is also the last Scooby-Doo production to be produced entirely by Hanna-Barbera. Beginning with 1998's Scooby-Doo on Zombie Island, Scooby-Doo related animated films and television series would at the very least, co-produced by Warner Bros. Animation.
4	Fox covers regular season National Football League games for the first time with the launch of their pre-game program, Fox NFL Sunday.
5	Univision broadcasts the final of the 17th National OTI Festival live from Miami.
9	The National Hockey League reaches a five-year, US$155 million contract with Fox for the broadcast television rights to the league's games, beginning with the 1994–95 season.
11	The 46th Primetime Emmy Awards were presented on ABC.
12	New World station WDAF-TV in Kansas City ends a 45-year affiliation with NBC to join Fox, with former Fox affiliate KSHB-TV linking up with NBC.
12	New World station KSAZ-TV in Phoenix ends a 40-year connection to CBS, with former independent KPHO-TV joining CBS. Due to Fox affiliate KNXV-TV having a contract that ends three months later, KSAZ-TV operates as an independent for the interregnum. KNXV-TV begins taking ABC programming on a piecemeal basis from soon-to-be former affiliate KTVK, the market's new independent.
12	Original Family Feud host Richard Dawson returns to the series after nine years, replacing his successor, Ray Combs; the show also expands from half-hour to full-hour episodes.
12	ABC affiliate WEWS, who previously aired only the first hour of Good Morning America, begins airing the full two-hour version of the show, and as a result, The Morning Exchange was shifted an hour back.
14	Gaylord Broadcasting agrees to affiliate both KTVT in Dallas and KSTW in Tacoma/Seattle with CBS.
21	The sitcom Daddy's Girls debuts on CBS. Although it is abandoned after three episodes, it is notable as the first series in which a gay principal character is played by an openly gay actor, Harvey Fierstein.
21	Sam Waterston makes his first appearance on NBC's Law & Order as Executive Assistant District Attorney Jack McCoy.
21	Now with Tom Brokaw and Katie Couric is merged into Dateline NBC, creating a Wednesday version of the series.
22	The pilot episode for Friends airs on NBC. It will rank as being the fifteenth-most-watched television show of the week, scoring 14.7/23 Nielsen rating (each point represented 954,000 households) and nearly 22 million viewers.
23	UWF Blackjack Brawl airs live on SportsChannel America. This is the first and only major live television supercard event produced by Herb Abrams' Universal Wrestling Federation (UWF). The event was a successor to UWF's only pay-per-view event, Beach Brawl.
24	The Marvel Action Hour, featuring animated adaptations of Iron Man and the Fantastic Four introduced by Stan Lee, debuts in syndication.

=== October ===
Date	Event
1	Fox affiliate KITN-TV in Minneapolis/St. Paul changes its name to WFTC-TV.
7	NBC airs the two-hour television movie, Saved by the Bell: Wedding in Las Vegas, which concerns the lead-up to Zack and Kelly's wedding. This particular film in effect, served as the series finale for Saved by the Bell: The College Years. When aired in syndication, it is commonly split into two double-length episodes.

=== November ===
Date	Event
3	Various NBC comedies feature storylines centered on blackout events. This included Mad About You, Friends, and Madman of the People.
15	Fox sells KDAF in Dallas to Renaissance Broadcasting for $100 million as a consequence of the New World/Fox alliance (KDFW would take over as the market's Fox affiliate the following year). In turn, Renaissance sells KDVR in Denver to Fox for $70 million and agrees to switch KDAF to The WB.
21	CBS sells WCAU-TV in Philadelphia to NBC in a complex asset swap. In exchange for WCAU-TV, NBC agrees to sell to CBS KCNC-TV in Denver and KUTV in Salt Lake City, along with the channel 4 license and transmitter for WTVJ in Miami; in turn, NBC receives the channel 6 license and transmitter for WCIX, also in Miami. The intellectual properties for both WTVJ and WCIX are retained.
29	The made-for-television film Bionic Ever After? is broadcast on CBS. This is the third and final reunion film for the television series The Six Million Dollar Man and its spin-off The Bionic Woman, following The Return of the Six Million Dollar Man and the Bionic Woman (1987) and Bionic Showdown: The Six Million Dollar Man and the Bionic Woman (1989). Lee Majors and Lindsay Wagner once again reprise their roles as Steve Austin and Jaime Sommers along with Richard Anderson (Oscar Goldman) and Martin E. Brooks (Dr. Rudy Wells).

=== December ===
Date	Event
3	Roughly a month and a half after making his final World Wrestling Federation television appearance, Randy Savage makes his World Championship Wrestling television debut on a live edition of WCW Saturday Night on TBS.
11	New World station WITI in Milwaukee ends a 27-year affiliation with CBS (it had also been with CBS from 1959 to 1961) to join Fox. Outgoing Fox affiliate WCGV-TV and independent WVTV turn down CBS as it didn't align with the existing philosophy of Sinclair Broadcast Group (which operated both stations), with WCGV-TV choosing to join UPN. WVCY-TV refused to sell to the network, while talks with independent WDJT-TV (channel 58), owned by Weigel Broadcasting, broke down in late September. With CBS considering piping in network-owned WBBM-TV or WFRV-TV to area cable companies, Weigel officials and CBS resume talks, inking a deal with WDJT-TV on December 5, five days prior.
11	New World station WJBK-TV in Detroit ends a 44-year affiliation with CBS to join Fox. With former Fox affiliate WKBD owned by Paramount Stations Group and committed to UPN, and no other station in the market willing to affiliate or be acquired by the network, CBS purchases independent WGPR-TV (channel 62)—the first Black-owned television station in the mainland United States—from the International Free and Accepted Modern Masons. CBS takes over operations the day of the switch via a local marketing agreement.
11	New World station WAGA-TV in Atlanta ends a 43-year affiliation with CBS to join Fox. Initially unable to find a replacement affiliate during the summer of 1994, CBS purchases WVEU (channel 69) from local interests, but the startup process became moot when WGNX agreed to a deal with the network. WATL-TV is sold by Fox to Qwest Broadcasting and joins The WB.
12	New World station WTVT in St. Petersburg/Tampa ends a 39-year affiliation with CBS to join Fox. Former ABC affiliate WTSP joins CBS, while outgoing Fox affiliate WFTS-TV joins ABC and launches local newscasts the same day.
12	KNXV-TV in Phoenix ends their affiliation with Fox, allowing KSAZ-TV (temporarily operating as an independent) to join the network. As part of KTVK's slow disaffiliation from ABC, KNXV-TV begins carrying all ABC News programming, including World News Tonight and Nightline, while KTVK continues to run ABC's daytime and primetime lineups through the end of the year.

== Programs ==
=== Debuts ===
Date	Show	Network
January 2	The Mighty Jungle	The Family Channel
January 2	Viper	NBC
January 3	Intimate Portrait	Lifetime
January 5	Birdland	ABC
January 7	Burke's Law	CBS
January 7	Ancient Mysteries	A&E
January 9	America's Castles	A&E
January 11	Monty	Fox
January 16	The George Carlin Show	Fox
January 17	Can We Shop starring Joan Rivers	Syndication
January 17	Rolonda	Syndication
January 17	TekWar	Syndication
January 26	Babylon 5	PTEN
January 26	The Critic	ABC
January 30	The Good Life	NBC
February 5	Where on Earth Is Carmen Sandiego?	Fox Kids
February 6	Aladdin	Syndication and CBS
February 14	Trashed	MTV
February 28	Later with Greg Kinnear	NBC
March 2	Tom	CBS
March 3	The Byrds of Paradise	ABC
March 5	Duckman	USA Network
March 5	Weird Science	USA Network
March 5	Secret Life of Toys	The Disney Channel
March 7	Boggle	The Family Channel
March 7	Shuffle	The Family Channel
March 9	The Busy World of Richard Scarry	Showtime
March 9	Thunder Alley	ABC
March 9	Turning Point	ABC
March 12	Winnetka Road	NBC
March 14	Someone Like Me	NBC
March 25	Mysteries of the Bible	A&E
March 29	Ellen	ABC
March 31	Traps	CBS
April 1	Sister, Sister	ABC
April 3	Christy	CBS
April 5	South Central	Fox
April 11	704 Hauser	CBS
April 15	Space Ghost Coast to Coast	Cartoon Network
April 16	All That	Nickelodeon
April 22	Dennis Miller Live	HBO
June 1	Breakfast Time	FX
June 1	Personal fX: The Collectibles Show	FX
June 1	The Pet Department	FX
June 1	Sound fX	FX
June 1	Under Scrutiny with Jane Wallace	FX
June 1	Backchat	FX
June 13	Jumble	The Family Channel
June 15	Dead at 21	MTV
June 20	The Howard Stern Show	E!
June 24	Encounters	Fox
June 27	Free 4 All	USA Network
June 27	Quicksilver	USA Network
June 29	Models Inc.	Fox
July 4	Politics with Chris Matthews	America's Talking
July 9	Thunderbirds	Fox Kids
July 9	Muddling Through	CBS
August 4	Hotel Malibu	CBS
August 14	Inside the Actors Studio	Bravo
August 15	The Brothers Grunt	MTV
August 25	Heaven Help Us	Syndication
August 25	My So Called Life	ABC
August 26	M.A.N.T.I.S.	Fox
August 29	Masters of the Maze	The Family Channel
August 29	Maximum Drive	The Family Channel
September 1	The Head	MTV
September 3	VR Troopers	Syndication
September 4	Fortune Hunter	Fox
September 4	Hardball	Fox
September 4	Wild Oats	Fox
September 5	Extra	Syndication
September 8	New York Undercover	Fox
September 10	Bump in the Night	ABC
September 10	The Magic School Bus	PTV
September 10	Beethoven	CBS
September 10	The Tick	Fox Kids
September 11	The Boys Are Back	CBS
September 12	Party of Five	Fox
September 12	The Dennis Prager Show	Syndication
September 12	The Gordon Elliott Show	Syndication
September 12	Jones & Jury	Syndication
September 12	Judge for Yourself	Syndication
September 12	The New Price is Right	Syndication
September 12	The Newz	Syndication
September 12	The Suzanne Somers Show	Syndication
September 13	On Our Own	ABC
September 14	All American Girl	ABC
September 15	McKenna	ABC
September 15	Due South	CBS
September 15	The Martin Short Show	NBC
September 15	Sweet Justice	NBC
September 17	The Baby Huey Show	Syndication
September 18	Chicago Hope	CBS
September 19	ER	NBC
September 20	Me and the Boys	ABC
September 21	Daddy's Girls	CBS
September 21	Touched by an Angel	CBS
September 21	The Cosby Mysteries	NBC
September 22	Friends	NBC
September 22	Madman of the People	NBC
September 24	Free Willy	ABC
September 24	ReBoot	ABC
September 24	The 5 Mrs. Buchanans	CBS
October 1	Wild C.A.T.s	CBS
October 3	Tattooed Teenage Alien Fighters from Beverly Hills	USA Network
October 3	The Fox Cubhouse	Fox Kids
October 3	Jim Henson's Animal Show	Fox Kids
October 4	Johnson and Friends	Fox Kids
October 5	Rimba's Island	Fox Kids
October 8	The Secret World of Alex Mack	Nickelodeon
October 15	My Brother and Me	Nickelodeon
October 22	Aaahh!!! Real Monsters	Nickelodeon
October 24	Allegra's Window	Nick Jr.
October 24	Gullah Gullah Island	Nick Jr.
October 24	Gargoyles	Syndication
November 6	Earth 2	NBC
November 16	Essence of Emeril	Food Network
November 19	Spider-Man	Fox Kids
December 1	U to U	Nickelodeon
December 2	Prime Games	Game Show Network
December 18	Life with Louie	Fox Kids

=== Ending this year ===
Date	Show	Debut
January 2	Doug (returned in 1996)	1991
January 14	The Les Brown Show	1993
January 19	George	1993
January 23	The NFL on CBS (returned in 1998)	1956
January 28	Cadillacs and Dinosaurs	1993
January 30	CityKids	1993
February 8	Saved by the Bell: The College Years	1993
February 18	Thea	1993
February 23	Bonkers	1993
February 25	Later with Bob Costas	1988
April 21	Herman's Head	1991
April 21	The Sinbad Show	1993
May 10	Roc	1991
May 19	In Living Color	1990
May 19	L.A. Law	1986
May 22	The Adventures of Brisco County, Jr.	1993
May 23	Star Trek: The Next Generation	1987
May 23	Evening Shade	1990
May 27	The Arsenio Hall Show	1989
May 28	Café Americain	1993
June 10	Shuffle	1994
June 18	Getting By	1993
June 18	Harts of the West	1993
July 1	Love Connection (returned in 1998)	1983
July 10	I Witness Video	1992
July 20	Dinosaurs	1991
July 23	Trashed	1994
August 8	Droopy, Master Detective	1993
August 14	Bakersfield P.D.	1993
August 27	Baby Races	1993
August 28	America's Funniest People	1990
September 7	Now with Tom Brokaw and Katie Couric	1993
September 7	Dead at 21	1994
September 8	Hotel Malibu	1994
September 25	Wild Oats	1994
September 30	Shop 'til You Drop (returned in 1996)	1991
October 1	Clarissa Explains It All	1991
October 2	Fortune Hunter	1994
October 12	Daddy's Girls	1994
October 22	Cro	1993
November 4	Free 4 All	1994
November 18	Boggle	1994
November 26	Dog City	1992
November 26	The Little Mermaid	1992
December 3	Beethoven	1994
December 3	Sonic the Hedgehog	1993
December 10	Tales from the Cryptkeeper (returned in 1999)	1993
December 10	Garfield and Friends	1988
December 20	Romper Room	1953
December 30	Jumble	1994

=== Entering syndication this year ===
Show	Seasons	In Production	Source
Beverly Hills, 90210	4	Yes	
Doogie Howser, M.D.	4	No	
Evening Shade	4	No	
The Fresh Prince of Bel-Air	4	Yes	
Northern Exposure	5	Yes	
The Simpsons	5	Yes	

=== Resuming this year ===
Title	Final aired	Previous network	New title	Returning network	Date of return
America Tonight	1991	CBS	Same	Same	June 1
Tiny Toon Adventures	1992	Fox Kids	Same	Same	March 27
The Kidsongs TV Show	1988	Syndication	Same	Syndicated through PBS member stations	April 4

=== Changing networks ===
Show	Moved from	Moved to
Aladdin	Disney Channel	CBS
Sirens	ABC	Syndication

=== Made-for-TV movies and miniseries ===
Air date	Title	Channel
January 24	Pointman	PTEN
February 13	Knight Rider 2010	Action Pack
February 27	Heaven & Hell: North & South, Book III	ABC
May 8–12	The Stand	ABC
April 24	Barney's Imagination Island	NBC
May 24	Seasons of the Heart	NBC
September 12	Danielle Steel's A Perfect Stranger	NBC
October 11	Out There II	Comedy Central
October 30	Without Warning	CBS
November 13	Scarlett	CBS
November 19	How the West Was Fun	ABC
November 20	Million Dollar Babies	CBS
November 28	Following Her Heart	NBC

== Networks and services ==
=== Launches ===
Network	Type	Launch date	Notes	Source
Action	Cable television	Unknown		
Mystery	Cable television	Unknown		
Westerns	Cable television	Unknown		
Starz!	Cable and satellite	February 1		
Outdoor Channel	Cable television	April 1		
Turner Classic Movies	Cable and satellite	April 14		
Classic Arts Showcase	Cable television	May 3		
TV! Channel	Cable and satellite	June		
fX	Cable television	June 1		
Newsworld International	Satellite television	June 1		
Trio	Satellite television	June 1		
Bloomberg Direct	Cable and satellite	June 17		
Love Stories	Cable television	July 1		
MuchMusic USA	Cable and satellite	July 1		
America's Talking	Cable and satellite	July 4		
Independent Film Channel	Cable and satellite	September 1		
True Stories & Drama	Cable television	September 12		
WAM! America's Youth Network	Cable television	September 12		
TFC	Cable and satellite	September 24		
fXM: Movies from Fox	Cable and satellite	October 31		
Game Show Network	Cable and satellite	December 1		
Telenoticias	Cable television	December 1		
Sega Channel	Cable television	December 14		
HGTV	Cable and satellite	December 30		

== Television stations ==
=== Station launches ===
Date	City of license/Market	Station	Channel	Affiliation
January 26	Wichita, KS	K61CG	61	Independent
March 16	Salem, IN (Louisville, KY)	WFTE	58	Independent
April 1	Greenville, TX	KTAQ	47	Shop at Home Network (primary); Jewelry Television (secondary)
April 15	Shreveport, LA	KWLB	45	Independent
April 16	Bangor, ME	W30BF	30	PBS / MPTV+
May 10	Dalton, GA–Chattanooga, TN	WELF-TV	23	TBN
June 6	Orlando, FL	WRBW	65	Independent
June 16	Crockett, TX	K16BY (Note: Translator of KETK-TV.)	16	NBC
June 19	Minneapolis–Saint Paul, MN	KVBM	45	HSN
June 20	Gainesville, FL	W14CB	14	America One
July 18	Eugene, OR	KROZ	36	Independent
July 20	Eureka, CA	KBVU (Note: Semi-satellite of KCVU.)	28	Fox
July 20	Eureka, CA	KEUV-LP	31	Univision
August 1	Tampa, FL	WFCT	66	Independent
August 8	Medford–Klamath Falls, OR	KMVU	26	Fox
August 18	Danville, VA (Roanoke–Lynchburg)	WDRG	24	Independent
August 26	Honolulu, HI	K60FJ	60	Univision
August 31	Austin, TX	KNVA	54	Local weather
September 1	Fort Collins, CO	KFCT (Note: Semi-satellite of KDVR.)	22	Fox
September 4	Nuevo Laredo, Tamaulipas, MX (Laredo, TX)	XHFTX	57	Fox
September 4	Reynosa, Tamaulipas, MX (Harlingen, TX)	XHFOX	17	Fox
September 6	Elmira, NY	WYDC	48	Independent
September 20	Duluth, MN	KNLD	21	Independent
September 21	Albany, NY	W26BL	26	FamilyNet
September 21	Florence–Myrtle Beach, SC	WWMB	21	Independent
October 15	Kannapolis, NC (Charlotte)	WKAY	64	Independent
October 20	New Orleans, LA	WHNO	20	LeSEA
October 21	Rock Hill, SC (Charlotte)	WFVT-TV	55	Independent
October 31	Bryan, TX	KYLE-TV	28	Independent
December 29	Tulsa, OK	K50JG	50	TBN
December 31	Memphis, TN	WFBI	50	HSN
Unknown date	Minneapolis–Saint Paul, MN	K69GB	69	3ABN
Unknown date	Pittsburgh, PA	WBPA-LP	29	Independent
Unknown date	Victoria, TX	K64EQ	64	NBC

=== Stations changing network affiliation ===
Date	City of license/Market	Station	Channel	Prior affiliation	New affiliation
April 17	West Monroe–Monroe, LA–El Dorado, AR	KARD	14	ABC	Fox
September 3	Cleveland–Shaker Heights, OH	WJW-TV	8	CBS	Fox
September 3	Cleveland–Shaker Heights, OH	WOIO	19	Fox	CBS
September 12	Kansas City, MO	WDAF-TV	4	NBC	Fox
September 12	Kansas City, MO	KSHB-TV	41	Fox	NBC
September 12	Phoenix, AZ	KPHO-TV	5	Independent	CBS
September 12	Phoenix, AZ	KSAZ-TV	10	CBS	Independent
December 11	Atlanta, GA	WAGA-TV	5	CBS	Fox
December 11	Atlanta, GA	WATL-TV	36	Fox	Independent (Note: Joined The WB in January 1995.)
December 11	Atlanta, GA	WGNX	46	Independent	CBS
December 11	Detroit, MI	WJBK-TV	2	CBS	Fox
December 11	Detroit, MI	WKBD-TV	50	Fox	Independent (Note: Joined UPN in January 1995.)
December 11	Detroit, MI	WGPR-TV	62	Independent	CBS
December 11	Milwaukee, WI	WITI	6	CBS	Fox
December 11	Milwaukee, WI	WCGV-TV	24	Fox	Independent
December 11	Milwaukee, WI	WDJT-TV	58	Independent	CBS
December 12	Phoenix, AZ	KSAZ-TV	10	Independent	Fox
December 12	Phoenix, AZ	KTVK	3	ABC	Independent (Note: KTVK began dropping ABC programming on a piecemeal basis in the summer of 1994, much of which KNXV-TV added while still a Fox affiliate. While carrying the majority of ABC programming on December 12, 1994, KNVX did not officially become an ABC affiliate until January 9, 1995.)
December 12	Phoenix, AZ	KNXV-TV	15	Fox	ABC
December 12	Tampa–St. Petersburg, FL	WTSP	10	ABC	CBS
December 12	Tampa–St. Petersburg, FL	WTVT	13	CBS	Fox
December 12	Tampa–St. Petersburg, FL	WFTS-TV	28	Fox	ABC

== Births ==
Date	Name	Notability
January 19	Kristi Lauren	Actress (I Hate My Teenage Daughter)
January 21	Marny Kennedy	Australian actress (Mortified)
January 21	Chanelle Peloso	Canadian actress (Incredible Crew)
January 21	Booboo Stewart	Actor (Descendants)
February 1	Harry Styles	English actor and singer (One Direction)
February 6	Charlie Heaton	English actor (Stranger Things)
February 10	Makenzie Vega	Actress (The Geena Davis Show, The Good Wife) and sister of Alexa Vega
February 11	Dominic Janes	Actor (ER, Out of Jimmy's Head)
February 14	Allie Grant	Actress (Weeds, Suburgatory, All Night)
February 14	Paul Butcher	Actor (Zoey 101)
February 15	Corinne Foxx	Actress
February 21	Hayley Orrantia	Actress (The Goldbergs) and singer
February 23	Dakota Fanning	Actress (Taken)
February 23	Cameron Palatas	Actor
March 1	Justin Bieber	Canadian singer and actor (Saturday Night Live)
March 2	Kofi Siriboe	Actor
March 5	Aislinn Paul	Canadian actress (Wild Card, Degrassi: The Next Generation, Heroes Reborn)
March 10	JoJo	Ring announcer (WWE, Total Divas)
March 12	Christina Grimmie	American singer (The Voice) (d. 2016)
March 12	Tyler Patrick Jones	Actor (Ghost Whisperer)
March 14	Ansel Elgort	American actor
March 14	Frankie Ryan Manriquez	Actor (Life with Bonnie, Higglytown Heroes)
March 16	Sierra McClain	Actress
March 22	Serena Kerrigan	Voice actress (Alicia on Go, Diego, Go!)
April 2	Sofie Zamchick	Voice actress (Whoopi's Littleburg, Wonder Pets) and singer
April 4	Chris O'Neal	Actor (How to Rock)
April 4	Nadia Alexander	Actress
April 9	Joey Pollari	Actor
April 11	Dakota Blue Richards	British actress (Skins)
April 12	Saoirse Ronan	Canadian actress (Kingdom Hospital)
April 14	Skyler Samuels	Actress (The Nine Lives of Chloe King, Scream Queens)
April 15	Arif Zahir	Actor
April 16	Liliana Mumy	Actress (Lilo & Stitch: The Series, Higglytown Heroes, Catscratch, Chowder, The Cleaner, The Loud House) and singer
April 16	Midori Francis	Japanese-American actress (Dash & Lily)
April 18	Moisés Arias	Actor (Hannah Montana, Jean-Claude Van Johnson)
April 24	Jordan Fisher	Actor (Liv and Maddie, She-Ra and the Princesses of Power)
May 4	Alexander Gould	Actor (Weeds)
May 6	Noah Galvin	Actor
May 7	Dylan Gelula	Actress (Jennifer Falls, Chasing Life)
May 9	Braison Cyrus	Actor
May 10	Cazzie David	Actress
May 16	Miles Heizer	Actor (Parenthood)
May 20	Peyton Clark	Actor (I Didn't Do It)
May 24	Cayden Boyd	Australian actor
June 2	Jemma McKenzie-Brown	English actress
June 3	Anne Winters	Actress (Tyrant)
June 8	Liv Morgan	Pro wrestler
June 10	Deonna Purrazzo	Pro wrestler
June 11	Ivana Baquero	Spanish-American actress (The Shannara Chronicles)
June 15	Alice Englert	Australian actress (Jonathan Strange and Mr. Norrell)
June 16	Caitlyn Taylor Love	Actress (I'm in the Band, Ultimate Spider-Man)
June 23	Connor Jessup	Actor (Falling Skies)
June 24	Erin Moriarty	Actress (Red Widow, Jessica Jones)
June 29	Camila Mendes	Actress (Riverdale)
July 6	Camilla and Rebecca Rosso	Actresses (The Suite Life of Zack & Cody)
July 16	Mark Indelicato	Actor (Ugly Betty, Dead of Summer)
July 17	Jessica Amlee	Canadian actress (Heartland)
July 28	Tyler Peterson	Actor (How I Met Your Mother)
August 9	Forrest Landis	Actor
August 11	Alejandro Aranda	Singer (American Idol)
August 17	Taissa Farmiga	Actress (American Horror Story) and sister of Vera Farmiga
August 18	Michaela Jill Murphy	Voice actress (The Emperor's New School, Avatar: The Last Airbender)
August 18	Madelaine Petsch	Actress (Riverdale)
August 22	Israel Broussard	Actor
August 25	Natasha Liu Bordizzo	Actress
August 27	Ellar Coltrane	Actor
September 8	Cameron Dallas	Actor
September 13	Mitch Holleman	Actor (Reba)
September 16	Jesse Schwartz	Voice actor (Leo on Little Einsteins (2005–06))
September 17	Denyse Tontz	Actress (Big Time Rush, Dog with a Blog)
September 25	Jansen Panettiere	Voice actor (Truman X on The X's) (d. 2023)
September 29	Clara Mamet	Actress
October 9	Jodelle Ferland	Actress (Kingdom Hospital)
October 13	Noah Crawford	Actor (My Name is Earl, How to Rock)
October 24	Paola Lázaro	Actress
October 25	Chloe Rose	Canadian actress (Degrassi: The Next Generation)
October 26	Allie DeBerry	Actress (A.N.T. Farm) and model
October 26	Morgan Saylor	Actress (Homeland)
October 27	Eddie Alderson	Actor (One Life to Live)
November 1	Rocky Lynch	Actor and singer (R5)
November 8	Lauren Alaina	Singer (American Idol)
November 10	Zoey Deutch	Actress (Ringer)
November 11	Connor Price	Canadian voice actor (The Save-Ums!)
November 11	Lio Rush	Pro wrestler
November 13	David Levi	Actor (The Naked Brothers Band)
November 15	Emma Dumont	Actress (Bunheads, Aquarius)
November 16	India Ennenga	Actress (Pinky Dinky Doo, Treme, The Returned)
November 16	Brandon Larracuente	Actor
November 17	Raquel Castro	Actress
November 21	Victoria de Lesseps	Television personality
November 22	Dacre Montgomery	Australian actor (Stranger Things)
December 3	Jake T. Austin	Actor (Wizards of Waverly Place, The Fosters, Go, Diego, Go!)
December 11	Gabriel Basso	Actor (The Big C)
December 14	Joshua Dionisio	Filipino actor
December 15	Emma Lockhart	Actress
December 17	Nat Wolff	Actor (The Naked Brothers Band) and singer
December 23	Reed Alexander	Actor (iCarly)
December 24	LaShawn Tináh Jefferies	Voice actress (Uniqua on The Backyardigans)
December 26	Samantha Boscarino	Actress (Good Luck Charlie, How to Rock)

== Deaths ==
Date	Name	Age	Notability
January 1	Cesar Romero	86	Actor (The Joker on Batman)
January 8	Pat Buttram	78	Actor (Mr. Haney on Green Acres)
January 22	Telly Savalas	72	Actor (Theo Kojak on Kojak)
January 28	Hal Smith	77	Actor (Otis on The Andy Griffith Show, Dr. Seuss special)
February 11	Sorrell Booke	64	Actor (Boss Hogg on The Dukes of Hazzard)
February 11	William Conrad	73	Actor (Cannon, Jake and the Fatman, The Rocky and Bullwinkle Show)
February 24	Dinah Shore	76	Singer and talk show hostess (Dinah!)
March 4	John Candy	43	Comedian and actor (SCTV)
March 21	Dack Rambo	52	Actor (Jack Ewing on Dallas)
March 21	Macdonald Carey	81	Actor (Tom Horton in Days of Our Lives)
March 22	Walter Lantz	94	Cartoonist, creator of Woody Woodpecker
April 2	Betty Furness	78	Consumer advocate and spokesperson (The Today Show)
April 5	Kurt Cobain	27	Singer, songwriter, musician (Nirvana, Saturday Night Live [1992/93])
April 22	Richard Nixon	81	37th President of the United States
May 8	George Peppard	65	Actor (Banacek, Hannibal on The A-Team)
May 19	Jacqueline Kennedy	64	First Lady of the United States and spouse of President John F. Kennedy
June 1	Frances Heflin	73	Soap opera actress (All My Children)
June 11	Herbert Anderson	77	Actor (Henry Mitchell on Dennis the Menace)
June 14	Henry Mancini	70	Composer ("Peter Gunn Theme")
July 7	Cameron Mitchell	75	Actor (Uncle Buck on The High Chaparral)
July 8	Dick Sargent	64	Actor (Darrin Stephens #2 on Bewitched)
August 21	Danitra Vance	40	Comedian (the first African-American woman regular on Saturday Night Live)
September 3	James T. Aubrey	75	Head of programming at CBS (1963–64)
September 16	Jack Dodson	63	Actor (Howard Sprague on The Andy Griffith Show)
October 2	Harriet Nelson	85	Singer and actress (The Adventures of Ozzie and Harriet)
October 19	Martha Raye	78	Comic actress and singer (The Martha Raye Show)
October 25	Mildred Natwick	89	Actress (The Snoop Sisters)
November 8	Michael O'Donoghue	54	Comedy writer (Saturday Night Live)
November 9	Priscilla Morrill	67	Character actress (Mrs. Vanderkellen on Newhart)
November 11	Pedro Zamora	22	HIV-positive participant of (The Real World)
November 18	Cab Calloway	86	American jazz singer
November 30	Lionel Stander	86	Actor (Max on Hart to Hart)
December 18	Don Fedderson	81	Producer (My Three Sons)

== Television debuts ==
- C. Martin Croker - Space Ghost Coast to Coast

== See also ==
- 1994 in the United States
- List of American films of 1994
