= Jonathan Todd Ross =

American voice actor and writer (born 1978)

Jonathan Ross
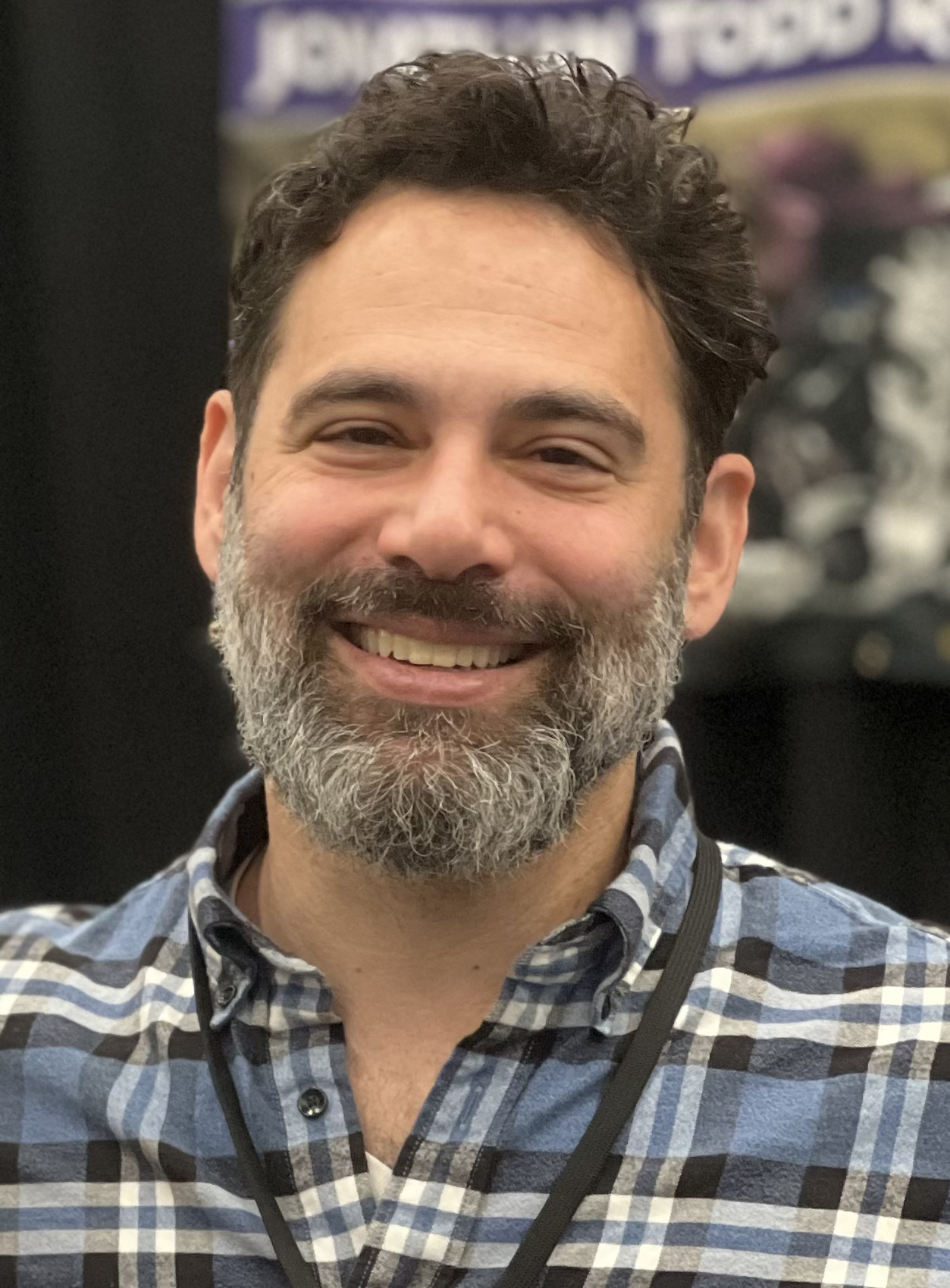
- Ross at SacAnime Roseville in 2025
- Born: Jonathan Todd Ross; May 30, 1978 (age 48); Chicago, Illinois, U.S.
- Occupations: Voice actor, writer
- Years active: 2000–present

Jonathan Todd Ross (born May 30, 1978) is an American voice actor and writer. He is known for providing voices on properties for 4Kids Entertainment, Central Park Media, Media Blasters, as well as audiobooks. He is also credited as Todd Garbeil. Ross is best known as the voice of Marik Ishtar and Yami Marik in the Yu-Gi-Oh! anime. He also voiced Slade Princeton in Yu-Gi-Oh! GX.

== Filmography ==
=== Television roles ===
Year	Title	Role	Notes
2007	Guiding Light	Tommy	Guest star
2007	One Life to Live	Delivery Man Tommy	Guest star
2007	The Bronx is Burning	Robert Violante	Guest star

=== Film roles ===
Year	Title	Role	Notes
2009	Cleansing	Ryan O'Connor	
2012	Bikes	Ryan	

=== Animation roles ===
- Genshiken - Genshiken President
- Kujibiki Unbalance - Mugio Rokuhara
- One Piece (4Kids dub edition) - Kohza, Ben Beckman
- Pokémon - Tommy, Robin, Watt, Vito
- Teenage Mutant Ninja Turtles - Sid Jones
- Time Bokan: Royal Revival - Ken the Eagle, Narrator
- Winx Club (4Kids Entertainment edit) - Additional voices
- Yu-Gi-Oh! - Marik Ishtar, Yami Marik, Strings, Additional voices
- Yu-Gi-Oh! GX - Jagger Princeton, Slade Princeton
- Yu-Gi-Oh! 5D's - Unnamed Yliaster member
- Shaman King (2021 series) - Kalim

=== Video games ===
- Yu-Gi-Oh! Capsule Monster Coliseum - Yami Marik, Marik Ishtar
- Yu-Gi-Oh! Duel Links - Yami Marik, Marik Ishtar

=== Audiobooks ===
- An Elegant Solution
- Animal Grossology
- Dirty Laundry
- Eating Animals
- Fake Mustache
- Fat Chance: Beating the Odds Against Sugar, Processed Food, Obesity, and Disease
- Finite and Infinite Games
- The Four
- Framed
- George Brown, Class Clown
- Goldberg Variations by Susan Isaacs
- Hero Type
- Hold Me Closer Necromancer
- Ignition! An Informal History of Liquid Rocket Propellants
- Kiss: I Wanna Rock and Roll All Night
- Leap
- Little Failure - A Memoir
- Lockstep
- Middle Men: Stories
- My Father's Business
- Necromancing the Stone
- No Time Like the Present
- Restart
- Rooftops of Tehran
- Slither: How Nature's Most Maligned Creatures Illuminate Our World
- Swindle
- The Men Can't Be Saved
- The Private Lives of Public Birds
- The TB12 Method: How to Achieve a Lifetime of Sustained Peak Performance
- The Son Also Rises: Surnames and the History of Social Mobility
- The Strange Case of Origami Yoda
- The Year of Living Biblically
- Ungifted
- Young Zeus
- Your Consent is Not Required: The Rise in Psychiatric Detentions, Forced Treatment, and Abusive Guardianships
- Zoobreak
