= You Gotta See This =

- Genre: Reality
- Presented by: Noah Crawford; Chris O'Neal
- Theme music composer: Brian Wayy
- Opening theme: "P.A.F."
- Country of origin: United States
- Original language: English
- No. of seasons: 1
- No. of episodes: 20 (8 unaired)

Production
- Executive producers: KP Anderson; Jay James; Gary Snegaroff
- Producer: Vanessa Rennard
- Running time: Approx. 23 minutes
- Production companies: Comcast Entertainment Studios; Nickelodeon Productions

Original release
- Network: Nickelodeon (2012); Nicktoons (2014)
- Release: July 21, 2012 – April 1, 2014

Related
- Ridiculousness

You Gotta See This is an American reality television series produced by Comcast Entertainment Studios for Nickelodeon. The series premiered on July 21, 2012. It was hosted by Noah Crawford and Chris O'Neal.

== Synopsis ==
Nickelodeon describes the series as combining "the best of the web, behind-the-scenes footage, celebrity interviews, pranks, bloopers" and as a 30-minute series that "rolls all the must-see clips of the week into one hilarious package".

== Production ==
A 20-episode season of You Gotta See This was ordered by Nickelodeon in 2012, with production underway by summer 2012. The series was cancelled by Nickelodeon after one season.

== Episodes ==
| No. | Title | Original release date | Prod. code | U.S. viewers (millions) |
|---|---|---|---|---|
| 1 | "Dancing Don'ts and Sneezy Cereal" | July 21, 2012 | 101 | 2.7 |
Noah and Chris show off the latest and craziest Internet clips, a prank on One Direction, Big Time Rush bloopers, and a backyard experiment.
| 2 | "Funny Foxes and Tumbling Toddlers" | July 28, 2012 | 103 | 2.4 |
Internet clips; One Direction introduces a sports clip; behind-the-scenes of iCarly.
| 3 | "Bouncing Babies and Water Wipeouts" | August 12, 2012 | 104 | N/A |
Wacky clips, One Direction introduces a hot new musical act, Crazy Jackson launches baking soda rockets, Noah & Chris have a dance-off.
| 4 | "Gamer Grandpas and Snappy Seagulls" | August 18, 2012 | 105 | 1.9 |
Sports bloopers; Internet videos. Also: One Direction battle with dart guns; Noah gets pranked on the set of How to Rock.
| 5 | "Playful Piggies and Fashion Falls" | August 19, 2012 | 106 | 1.6 |
One Direction plays foosball; Chris does a ribbon dance; Noah converses with a cat. Also: Internet videos and the stars of Victorious.
| 6 | "Homework Haters and Sneaky Snakes" | August 25, 2012 | 107 | 1.6 |
Internet videos and hilarious pranks; One Direction takes the cookie challenge; fails from around the world.
| 7 | "Clumsy Cowboys and Weird Weather" | October 11, 2012 | 111 | 1.2 |
Internet clips; Kendall Jenner is pranked by her sister Kylie; One Direction introduces a clip.
| 8 | "Epic Elephants and Wild Watermelons" | October 18, 2012 | 114 | 1.0 |
Silly Internet clips; explosive watermelon experiment; One Direction plays basketball.
| 9 | "Powder Pranks and Donkey Duets" | April 1, 2014 (Nicktoons) | 109 | N/A |
Internet videos; Chris and Noah break dance; Crazy Jackson mails pudding; One Direction plays charades.
| 10 | "Pic Pranks and Tiny Turtles" | April 1, 2014 (Nicktoons) | 117 | N/A |
Noah and Chris find the most awesome internet videos watch amazing voice impressions, and go on a photo-bombing adventure.
| 11 | "Pizza Pros and Basketball Bros" | April 1, 2014 (Nicktoons) | 110 | N/A |
Internet clips; Crazy Jackson walks on eggs; backstage with the cast of iCarly; Chris gets pranked.
| 12 | "Parent Pranks and Radical Rainbows" | April 1, 2014 (Nicktoons) | 113 | N/A |
Noah and Chris share the latest and greatest Internet videos including surprise scares and mega cheeseballs, and Noah gets pranked.
| 13 | "Sleepy Skiers and Wicked Wedgies" | Unaired | 118 | N/A |
Internet videos; the cast of iCarly; One Direction goes superhero.
| 14 | "Daring Ducks and Bumbling Bands" | Unaired | 112 | N/A |
Noah and Chris find the most hilarious web videos, hit the streets to discover swag-tasting talent, and One Direction introduces the latest Internet sensation.
| 15 | "Angry Alligators and Slippery Slides" | Unaired | 115 | N/A |
Noah and Chris share crazy internet videos including epic karate fails, angry animals and super sports clips, plus One Direction introduces a hilarious game.
| 16 | "Fake Fame and Wet Weddings" | Unaired | 116 | N/A |
Noah and Chris show off epic Internet videos, One Direction introduces a hot new video, and a lucky kid gets a taste of fame for a day.
| 17 | "Karate Cats and Groovin' Grandmas" | November 2, 2012 (Amazon Prime Video) | 102 | N/A |
Internet videos; Ciara Bravo gets pranked; the boys from One Direction take the stacking challenge; Crazy Jackson creates an ice cream sundae slide.
| 18 | "Window Wipers and Dazzling Dragons" | Unaired | 119 | N/A |
Internet videos; backstage with the cast of Marvin Marvin; One Direction shows off a new talent.
| 19 | "Gossiping Goats and Dizzy Dudes" | Unaired | 108 | N/A |
Silly Internet clips; epic trampoline fails; Crazy Jackson tries to break a world record; a talking goat.
| 20 | "Penguin Play and Bike Bails" | Unaired | 120 | N/A |
Noah and Chris share Internet clips including double fails, a musical mash-up and One Direction bloopers.

== Broadcast ==
You Gotta See This premiered on Nickelodeon on July 21, 2012. Eight episodes of the series aired before it was pulled from the network. On April 1, 2014, four episodes of the series made their U.S. debut on Nicktoons. Eight episodes were never aired in the U.S.

The series premiered on Nickelodeon Canada, Nickelodeon (Philippines) and Nickelodeon U.K. and Ireland and Nickelodeon Southeast Asia in January 2013, and on Nickelodeon (Australia) in February 2013. In May 2013, these countries began to air the remaining episodes that hadn't been aired in the United States at the time.

In June 2013, Nickelodeon confirmed that You Gotta See This would premiere on Nickelodeon Brazil and Nickelodeon Latin America on July 5, 2013.
