= Jonathan Beard =

American orchestrator and composer

- Born: 1981 (age 44–45)
- Genres: Film score, classical, electroacoustic
- Occupations: Composer, orchestrator, educator
- Instruments: Cello, piano
- Years active: 2003–present
- Label: Lakeshore Records
- Website: jonathanbeard.com

Jonathan Beard is an American orchestrator and composer for media and the concert stage. His credits include Us, The Handmaid's Tale, Despicable Me 3, Star Wars: Battlefront II, and Wicked. Beard also works as an educator, and currently teaches at the UCLA Herb Alpert School of Music.

== Background ==
Beard finished Summerfield Waldorf School in Santa Rosa in 1999. He majored in musical composition at Stanford University, and received a master's degree from UCLA.

== Career ==
As a composer, Beard has worked on a variety of projects for chamber music, stage performances, and visual media. His composed the music for the documentary 3 Seconds in October - The Killing of Andy Lopez, which won the Emmy Award for Societal Concerns from the San Francisco/Northern California Chapter of the National Academy of Television Arts and Sciences. Other recent projects include his electroacoustic suite Ritual, his opera Cesare, Child of Night (OPERA UCLA premiere Fall 2021), the film scores to What Still Remains, Heavenquest, and Frank vs. God; and De tu puño y letra, an electronic video-sound collaboration with artist Suzanne Lacy. He has served on the composing teams for video games such as Star Wars: Battlefront I and II, and guest-composed for ABC's Once Upon a Time. For the stage, Beard co-composed the oratorio The Passion of Anne Frank for the Los Angeles Master Chorale as part of their Voices Within residency, and his original theatre-score for Driving Miss Daisy received an NAACP Theatre Award nomination.

As an orchestrator, Beard has collaborated with other composers on more than 100 film, TV, and video game titles, including Minions: The Rise of Gru, The Handmaid's Tale, King Richard, The Mandalorian, and God of War. He has worked extensively with composers such as Junkie XL (Alita: Battle Angel; Deadpool), Bear McCreary (Godzilla: King of the Monsters; 10 Cloverfield Lane), Pinar Toprak (Stargirl), Kris Bowers (Green Book), Michael Abels (Us, Nope), Heitor Pereira (Despicable Me 3), among others. He is the co-founder of Tutti Music Partners, a boutique orchestration firm that specializes in providing support to other composers throughout the industry.

Beard has often talked about his passion for musical color extending into synthesis and sound design. He has many hybrid and fully electronic projects to his name, including Cesare, Child Of Night; A Killer of Men; and his electroacoustic commission for the Pacific Symphony, Chaos in the Garden: A Rewrite of Spring.

In 2011 he joined the faculty at his alma mater, UCLA, where he teaches electronic music composition and music technology in the Herb Alpert School of Music. Beard has also worked extensively throughout the Los Angeles Area, working as co-conductor of the LA’s Best-ETM LA After-School Youth Orchestra, as a lecturer for the Cal State Northridge music department, and with the Pacific Symphony to help educate casual symphonic listeners about orchestration.

== Filmography ==
=== Films ===
==== Feature films ====
Year	Title	Occupation(s) and role(s)	Note
2003	12	Music producer Music orchestrator Music composer	—N/a
2006	The Insatiable	Music orchestrator	—N/a
2007	Dark and Bloody Ground	Music composer	—N/a
2007	Return to House on Haunted Hill	Co-music editor Synthesizer programmer	—N/a
2007	The Reaping	MIDI editor Assistant to music composer	—N/a
2008	House	Musician	—N/a
2008	Pig Hunt	Musician	—N/a
2008	Rest Stop: Don't Look Back	Music composer	Special features only
2009	Countdown: Jerusalem	Music orchestrator	—N/a
2009	From Mexico with Love	Assistant to music composer	—N/a
2009	Stories from Baghdad USA	Music composer	—N/a
2009	Without a Paddle: Nature's Calling	Music composer	Special features only
2010	New Kids Turbo	Additional music composer Music orchestrator	—N/a
2010	Step Up 3D	Music orchestrator	—N/a
2011	The Heineken Kidnapping	Additional music composer	—N/a
2011	There Be Dragons	Electronic music consultant Orchestral assistant	—N/a
2012	Three Days (of Hamlet)	Music orchestrator Music composer	—N/a
2013	Collision	Cellist	—N/a
2013	Romeo & Juliet	Orchestral assistant	—N/a
2014	At the Devil's Door	Music producer	—N/a
2014	Frank vs. God	Music producer Music composer	—N/a
2014	Justice League: War	Additional music composer	—N/a
2015	Black Mass	Music preparation	—N/a
2015	Minions	Music orchestrator	—N/a
2015	Point Break	Music orchestrator	—N/a
2015	Run All Night	Music orchestrator	—N/a
2015	The True Cost	Orchestral assistant	—N/a
2016	10 Cloverfield Lane	Cellist; Music orchestrator	—N/a
2016	Brimstone	Music orchestrator	—N/a
2016	Central Intelligence	Additional music orchestrator	—N/a
2016	Deadpool	Music orchestrator	—N/a
2016	Eloise	Music consultant	—N/a
2016	Jack Reacher: Never Go Back	Additional music orchestrator	—N/a
2016	Spectral	Music orchestrator	—N/a
2016	True Memoirs of an International Assassin	Music consultant	—N/a
2017	Animal Crackers	Music consultant	—N/a
2017	Annabelle: Creation	Music orchestrator	—N/a
2017	Despicable Me 3	Music orchestrator	—N/a
2017	Girls Trip	Music creator	—N/a
2017	Happy Death Day	Music consultant	—N/a
2017	Jumanji: Welcome to the Jungle	Additional music orchestrator	—N/a
2017	Kingsman: The Golden Circle	Additional music orchestrator	—N/a
2017	Kong: Skull Island	Additional music orchestrator	—N/a
2017	The Dark Tower	Music orchestrator	—N/a
2017	The Death of Stalin	Music consultant Music orchestrator	—N/a
2017	The Unknown Soldier	Music consultant	—N/a
2018	Creed II	Music orchestrator	—N/a
2018	Goosebumps 2: Haunted Halloween	Music orchestrator	—N/a
2018	Green Book	Music orchestrator	—N/a
2018	Mortal Engines	Music orchestrator	—N/a
2018	Puzzle	Music consultant	—N/a
2018	Ralph Breaks the Internet	Additional music orchestrator	—N/a
2018	Smallfoot	Music orchestrator	—N/a
2018	The Cloverfield Paradox	Music orchestrator	—N/a
2018	The Nun	Music preparation	—N/a
2018	The Predator	Music orchestrator	—N/a
2018	Tomb Raider	Music orchestrator	—N/a
2018	Venom	Music orchestrator	—N/a
2018	What Still Remains	Music composer	—N/a
2019	Alita: Battle Angel	Music orchestrator	—N/a
2019	Child's Play	Lead music orchestrator	—N/a
2019	Godzilla: King of the Monsters	Music orchestrator	—N/a
2019	Happy Death Day 2U	Music consultant	—N/a
2019	Jumanji: The Next Level	Music orchestrator	—N/a
2019	Rim of the World	Music consultant	—N/a
2019	Terminator: Dark Fate	Music orchestrator	—N/a
2019	The Personal History of David Copperfield	Music orchestrator	—N/a
2019	The Professor and the Madman	Music consultant	—N/a
2019	Togo	Music creator	—N/a
2019	Us	Music orchestrator	—N/a
2020	Freaky	Music consultant	—N/a
2020	Heavenquest: A Pilgrim’s Progress	Additional percussion arranger Music producer Associate producer Music composer	—N/a
2020	Mank	Music preparation	—N/a
2020	Scoob!	Music orchestrator	—N/a
2020	Sonic the Hedgehog	Music orchestrator	—N/a
2021	Chaos Walking	Music consultant	—N/a
2021	Fear Street Part One: 1994	Music orchestrator	—N/a
2021	Fear Street Part Two: 1978	Music orchestrator	—N/a
2021	Fear Street Part Three: 1666	Music orchestrator	—N/a
2021	King Richard	Music orchestrator	—N/a
2021	Respect	Music orchestrator	—N/a
2021	Ron's Gone Wrong	Music orchestrator	—N/a
2021	Space Jam: A New Legacy	Music orchestrator	—N/a
2021	The Suicide Squad	Music orchestrator	—N/a
2021	The United States vs. Billie Holiday	Music orchestrator	—N/a
2021	Venom: Let There Be Carnage	Music orchestrator	—N/a
2021	Zack Snyder's Justice League	Music orchestrator	—N/a
2022	Chevalier	Music orchestrator	—N/a
2022	Doctor Strange in the Multiverse of Madness	Music orchestrator	—N/a
2022	Lyle, Lyle, Crocodile	Additional music orchestrator	—N/a
2022	Minions: The Rise of Gru	Music orchestrator	—N/a
2022	Nope	Music orchestrator	—N/a
2022	Paws of Fury: The Legend of Hank	Music consultant	—N/a
2022	Shotgun Wedding	Music orchestrator	—N/a
2022	Slumberland	Music orchestrator	—N/a
2022	Sonic the Hedgehog 2	Music orchestrator	—N/a
2022	Spirited	Music orchestrator	—N/a
2022	Strange World	Music orchestrator	—N/a
2022	The 355	Music orchestrator	—N/a
2022	The Gray Man	Additional music orchestrator	—N/a
2022	The Lost City	Music orchestrator	—N/a
2022	Three Thousand Years of Longing	Music orchestrator	—N/a
2023	Family Switch	Music orchestrator	—N/a
2023	Fool's Paradise	Music orchestrator	—N/a
2023	Guardians of the Galaxy Vol. 3	Music orchestrator	—N/a
2023	Merry Little Batman	Music orchestrator	—N/a
2023	Old Dads	Music consultant	—N/a
2023	On a Wing and a Prayer	Music orchestrator	—N/a
2023	Pet Sematary: Bloodlines	Music orchestrator	—N/a
2023	Rebel Moon – Part One: A Child of Fire	Music orchestrator	—N/a
2023	Thanksgiving	Music consultant	—N/a
2023	The Color Purple	Music orchestrator	—N/a
2023	The Nun II	Music orchestrator	—N/a
2024	Beating Hearts	Music orchestrator	—N/a
2024	Beetlejuice Beetlejuice	Music orchestrator	—N/a
2024	Furiosa: A Mad Max Saga	Music orchestrator	—N/a
2024	Godzilla x Kong: The New Empire	Music orchestrator	—N/a
2024	Imaginary	Music consultant	—N/a
2024	Lonely Planet	Supervising music orchestrator	—N/a
2024	Rebel Moon – Part Two: The Scargiver	Music orchestrator	—N/a
2024	Sonic the Hedgehog 3	Music orchestrator	—N/a
2024	Venom: The Last Dance	Music orchestrator	—N/a
2024	Wicked	Music orchestrator Additional song arranger	—N/a
2025	How to Train Your Dragon	Music orchestrator	—N/a
2025	Superman	Music orchestrator	—N/a
TBA	Persephone Speaks: The Forgotten Women of Bosnia	Music composer	—N/a

==== Short films ====
Year	Title	Occupation(s) and role(s)
2006	Still	Solo cellist
2007	Eddie Pepitone’s Ransom	Music composer
2007	The Depressed Rapper	Music composer
2007	The Heckler	Music composer Music producer
2009	Twirl	Music producer Music composer
2010	Bike Love	Music composer
2011	Library of Dust	Music composer
2012	The Luckiest Man Alive	Music composer
2015	A Killer of Men	Music composer
2015	Frieda’s Turn	Music composer
2020	A Concerto Is a Conversation	Music orchestrator Music copyist
2020	Mickey & Minnie’s Runaway Railway	Music orchestrator
2021	3 Seconds in October	Music composer
2024	Nocturne	Music composer

=== Television ===
==== TV series ====
Year	Title	Occupation(s) and role(s)	Note
2004	Battle Plan Under Fire	Musician	—N/a
2007	Moonlight	Assistant to music composer	1 episode only
2007	The Suite Life of Zack & Cody	Orchestral assistant	1 episode only
2008	Dexter	Musician; Assistant music engineer Assistant music mixer Assistant music recording engineer Music mixer Music programmer Music recording engineer	6 episodes only
2008	Eleventh Hour	Musician	6 episodes only
2008	Ski Patrol	Additional music composer	2 episodes only
2010	Caprica	Music recording engineer	1 episode only
2010	Human Target	Orchestral assistant	11 episodes only
2010	Is She Really Going Out with Him?	Additional music composer	1 episode only
2010	Pit Boss	Additional music composer	3 episodes only
2010	The Millionaire Matchmaker	Additional music composer	16 episodes only
2010–2011	Eureka	Orchestral assistant Music recording engineer	4 episodes only
2010–2011	Nikita	Music orchestrator	2 episodes only
2010–2019	The Walking Dead	Music orchestrator Orchestral assistant Music recording engineer	6 episodes only
2011	So You Think You Can Dance	Additional music composer	1 episode only
2014	Defiance	Music orchestrator	1 episode only
2014	Outlander	Music consultant	1 episode only
2014–2015	Da Vinci's Demons	Music orchestrator	5 episodes only
2014–2018	Agents of S.H.I.E.L.D.	Music orchestrator	87 episodes only
2015	Constantine	Music orchestrator	2 episodes only
2015	Once Upon a Time	Additional music composer	2 episodes only
2015	Revenge	Music orchestrator	1 episode only
2015–2016	Penny Dreadful	Music orchestrator	16 episodes only
2017–2022	The Handmaid's Tale	Music orchestrator	18 episodes only
2018	Luke Cage	Music orchestrator	13 episodes only
2019	The Mandalorian	Music orchestrator	3 episodes only
2020	Your Honor	Music conductor Music orchestrator	4 episodes only
2020–2021	Stargirl	Music orchestrator	19 episodes only
2021	Animaniacs	Song orchestrator	8 episodes only
2021	Masters of the Universe: Revelation	Music consultant	10 episodes only
2022–2024	The Lord of the Rings: The Rings of Power	Music orchestrator	16 episodes only
2023	The Wonderful World of Mickey Mouse	Music orchestrator	1 episode only
2023–2024	Percy Jackson and the Olympians	Music orchestrator	8 episodes only

==== TV miniseries ====
Year	Title	Occupation(s) and role(s)	Note
2006	California and the American Dream	Music composer	1 episode only
2006	Ten Days That Unexpectedly Changed America	Assistant music editor Musician; Synthesizer programmer	1 episode only
2009	Deep Sea Salvage	Additional music composer	4 episodes only
2009	Maneater	Assistant to music composer	—N/a
2011	The Cape	Orchestral assistant	—N/a
2014–2015	Manny in Real Life	Music composer	—N/a
2018–2019	Tuntematon sotilas	Music orchestrator	—N/a

==== TV movies ====
Year	Title	Occupation and role
2003	MLK Boulevard	Music editor
2008	Another Day in Paradise	Synthesizer programmer
2008	Gym Teacher: The Movie	Assistant to music composer
2008	The Memory Keeper's Daughter	Assistant to music composer
2011	Red Faction: Origins	Supervising music editor

==== TV specials ====
Year	Title	Occupation and role
2006	Karaoke Superstars	Musician

=== Video games ===
Year	Title	Occupation(s) and role(s)
2011	SOCOM 4 U.S. Navy SEALs	Assistant music orchestrator
2015	Batman: Arkham Knight	Music consultant
2015	Star Wars: Battlefront	Additional music composer Music orchestrator
2015	Star Wars: The Old Republic - Knights of the Fallen Empire	Music composer
2017	Star Wars: Battlefront II	Additional music composer
2018	God of War	Music orchestrator
2019	Death Stranding	Music orchestrator
2019	Gears 5	Additional music orchestrator
2019	Madden NFL 20	Music orchestrator
2021	Call of Duty: Vanguard	Music orchestrator
2021	Death Stranding Director’s Cut	Music orchestrator
2022	God of War Ragnarök	Music orchestrator
2023	God of War Ragnarök: Valhalla	Music orchestrator
2023	Spider-Man 2	Music orchestrator

=== Podcasts ===
Year	Title	Role	Note
2022	The Temple of Geek Podcast	Himself	1 episode only
