= Tagged (web series) =

American psychological thriller web series

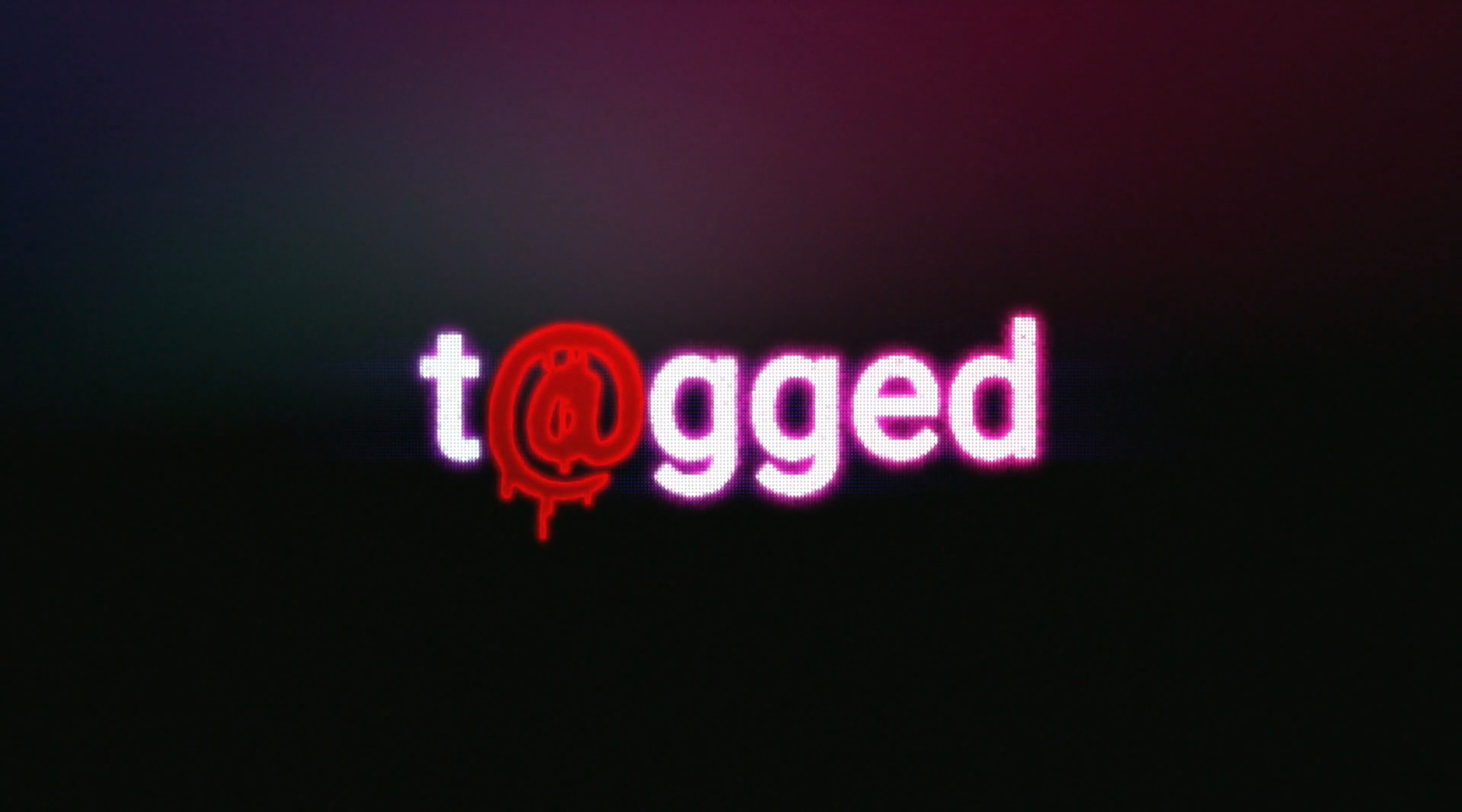
- Genre: Web series; Teen drama; Thriller; Horror
- Created by: Hannah Macpherson
- Written by: Hannah Macpherson
- Directed by: Hannah Macpherson
- Starring: Lia Marie Johnson; Lulu Antariksa; Katelyn Nacon
- Theme music composer: Frederik Weidmann
- Composer: Frederik Weidmann
- Country of origin: United States
- Original language: English
- No. of seasons: 3
- No. of episodes: 35

Production
- Running time: 22 minutes
- Production company: AwesomenessTV

Original release
- Network: go90 (seasons 1–2); Hulu (season 3)
- Release: July 19, 2016 – December 10, 2018

Tagged (stylized as T@gged) is an American teen psychological thriller web series, starring Lia Marie Johnson, Lulu Antariksa, and Katelyn Nacon. The series is produced by AwesomenessTV. The first season premiered on July 19, 2016 on go90, with the second season premiering on go90 on May 9, 2017. The third and final season was released via streaming on Hulu on December 7, 2018.

== Plot ==
T@gged follows three high school girls, Hailey, Rowan, and Elisia, whose online profiles get tagged in violent videos. Their social media profiles clue someone in on a lot of things about them, including where they live. The only way to save their lives is to figure out who's doing this, before the killer gets to them first. The thriller series T@gged takes the issue of privacy to the extreme and shows what happens when your social media profile falls into the wrong hands.

== Cast ==
- Lia Marie Johnson as Hailey (seasons 1–2; guest, season 3)
- Lulu Antariksa as Rowan
- Katelyn Nacon as Elisia
- Timothy Granaderos as Ash
- Tristin Mays as Brie (season 1; main for one episode of season 3)
- Danielle Savre as Ms. Dawson (seasons 1–2)
- Brendan Meyer as Eric/Dunbar Rakes (season 1 main; guest for one episode of season 3)
- Nick Fink as Jake
- Lukas Gage as Brandon
- Kurt Caceres as Fricks
- Claudia Sulewski as Nicki
- JC Caylen as Sean
- Rajiv Dhall as Stinger (seasons 2–3)
- Braeden Lemasters as Trevor (seasons 2–3)
- Noah Centineo as Hawk (seasons 2–3)
- Emma Dumont as Zoe (seasons 2–3)
- Hana Hayes as Tessa (season 3)
- Fivel Stewart as Jai (season 3)
- Chelsea Lopez as Alison (season 3)
- Ava Capri as Olive (season 3)

== Production ==
In September 2016, it was announced that T@gged was renewed for a second season, slated for a 2017 premiere. On May 1, 2017, before the season 2 premiere, AwesomenessTV announced that they had renewed T@gged for a third season. The third season was released on December 7, 2018 on Hulu, after go90 was shut down by Verizon.

=== Filming ===
T@gged was filmed in New Mexico. Production for the first season began in early 2016. The second season began production in September 2016. Production for the third season began in October 2017 and wrapped in December 2017.

== Episodes ==
Season	Episodes	Originally released		
Season	Episodes	First released	Last released	Network
1	11	July 19, 2016	September 13, 2016	go90
2	12	May 9, 2017	July 11, 2017	go90
3	12	December 7, 2018		Hulu

=== Season 1 (2016) ===
No. overall	No. in season	Title	Original release date
1	1	"#Shotgun"	July 19, 2016
When former best friends Rowan and Hailey find themselves tagged in an online video showcasing a murder, they begrudgingly team up in a quest to find the third girl tagged, outcast named Elisia, to determine if the video is real or a prank.
2	2	"#Realorfake"	July 19, 2016
Mysterious user "monkeyman" invites the girls to meet him at midnight, while Rowan's hacker sister, Brie, discovers he's not only sending them clues via text, but also posting stalker videos of them online.
3	3	"#Parentalguidance"	July 19, 2016
When the virtual threats escalate to the point of revealing the girls' biggest secrets, they have no choice but to meet Monkeyman at an old motel.
4	4	"#Nameofthegame"	July 26, 2016
After receiving a hostage video, the girls are forced to keep quiet until they figure out who Monkeyman is before time runs out.
5	5	"#Rememberme"	August 2, 2016
With no other choice, but to loop in Elisia's drug dealer ex-boyfriend, Ash, on their secret, the girls make a desperate plan to save their friend before it's too late.
6	6	"#Underpressure"	August 9, 2016
The countdown continues and Hailey receives a threat that she'll become the next victim. When she goes to visit Ash for a fix to help calm her anxiety, she discovers the threat of Monkeyman is real and very deadly.
7	7	"#Twoface"	August 16, 2016
With Monkeyman threatening the school assembly tomorrow and the countdown at 48 hours (the night of the big party), the girls list possible suspects and find a surprising one in their midst.
8	8	"#Sexliesandvideo"	August 23, 2016
The girls focus on stopping the school assembly from happening before Monkeyman hurts anyone. In apparent retribution, Monkeyman begins revealing their biggest secrets.
9	9	"#Yourturn"	August 30, 2016
As the girls get closer to exposing Monkeyman's identity, they are made to pay the price. Exhausted and defeated, Rowan is terrified to learn that she is next on the chopping block.
10	10	"#Crushed"	September 6, 2016
The girls get closer on their hunt for why Monkeyman is after them. However, a corrupt hard drive appears revealing something they never expected.
11	11	"#Monkeyman"	September 13, 2016
The group heads to the big party on the final night of the countdown. The final puzzle pieces are placed together and the truth is revealed.

=== Season 2 (2017) ===
No. overall	No. in season	Title	Original release date
12	1	"Resurrection"	May 9, 2017
Fixated on Dunbar's suicide, Rowan's as surprised as anybody to see Hailey back at school. Cryptic messages from monkeyman's account keep Rowan on high alert.
13	2	"Digging"	May 9, 2017
Zoe, a new student, buddies up to Rowan in class. Rowan lets Hailey and Elisia in on the suspicious messages she's been receiving, and an univited audience crashes Hailey's audition for the school play.
14	3	"Spotlight"	May 9, 2017
While Hailey gets acquainted to her new tutor, Hawk, Rowan discovers some unsettling information about the aftermath of Dunbar's suicide, and Elisia is attacked at the Grotto.
15	4	"Nicki"	May 16, 2017
Nicki falls into the mystery as Rowan searches Brandon's house for anything to support her nagging speculation, Hawk pushes Hailey to snap out of her apathetic haze, and the Zoo threatens a new target.
16	5	"Edit Tricks"	May 23, 2017
Rowan, Elisia, and Hailey meet Stinger who's done some digging on the Zoo, and later, a startling video stops Hailey in her tracks. Ash gets a mysterious text. Hailey and Sean finally decide to be together.
17	6	"Runaway"	May 30, 2017
The threat of the Zoo intensifies when it's clear that they're not going to limit themselves to scare tactics, and the girls begin to wonder if there's someone else who's also receiving messages.
18	7	"New Friends"	June 6, 2017
Rowan's haunted by the memory of Dunbar's suicide when she returns to Nicki's house, and girls night in takes an unexpected turn.
19	8	"Confrontation"	June 13, 2017
Elisia begins to suspect that Nicki could be the fourth target, and unusual happenings suggest that there may be outside influences motivating individuals' behavior.
20	9	"Chemistry"	June 20, 2017
Nicki comes forward with what she's been hiding from the girls, Rowan remains focused, and while new romances blossom, Elisia receives a message that changes everything.
21	10	"Control"	June 27, 2017
Rowan designs a plan to outsmart KingCobra that demands all hands on deck, but the Zoo makes it clear that they won't be beat at their own game.
22	11	"KingCobra"	July 4, 2017
With Hailey's help, Rowan attends a Zoo party in order to find KingCobra; however, Elisia's failure to act in accordance with their plan presents a new host of problems.
23	12	"Snaked"	July 11, 2017
Unsure of Ash's fate, Rowan, Hailey, and Elisia attend a heart-wrenching funeral service. With their number one suspect in police custody, the girls enjoy a fleeting respite.

=== Season 3 (2018) ===
No. overall	No. in season	Title	Original release date
24	1	"REWIND"	December 7, 2018
After the bonfire, Rowan and Elisia are determined to confront KingCobra, convinced they now know who it is.
25	2	"HELLO and GOODBYE"	December 7, 2018
Rowan’s and Trevor's worlds collide as they learn some interesting news, while Elisia continues her search for answers surrounding Ash's shooting.
26	3	"PROMISES"	December 7, 2018
Tessa approaches Rowan hoping she may be able to help her understand Nicki's suicide, while Rowan and Elisia learn about a dark web leader that may pose more of a threat than KingCobra.
27	4	"ANONYMOUS"	December 7, 2018
The guys head to prep school to learn what they can about Zoe’s past, while Elisia learns disturbing information surrounding the night Ash was shot.
28	5	"POSSESSED"	December 7, 2018
Trevor tries to convince Rowan to give Brandon another chance, and Elisia develops a new friendship.
29	6	"DEAD END"	December 7, 2018
Elisia realizes her relationship with Ash might be in trouble while Rowan meets Alison to discuss what she knows about the new threat.
30	7	"DEEP END"	December 7, 2018
Tessa turns to Elisia when she realizes she may be in great danger, while Rowan and Trevor follow a coded message to a strange location.
31	8	"MIRROR IMAGE"	December 7, 2018
The girls interrogate Jai to figure out what she's hiding.
32	9	"UPSIDE DOWN"	December 7, 2018
Ash looks for his little sister while Elisia and Rowan learn the hard way that you can't always trust those closest to you.
33	10	"GOOD NIGHT"	December 7, 2018
After a terrifying showdown, the girls realize where they have to go if they want to end this once and for all.
34	11	"SEE YOU LATER"	December 7, 2018
When Rowan and Elisia wake up in an unfamiliar place, they learn the hard way that there are always two sides to every story.
35	12	"SURRENDER"	December 7, 2018
Rowan and Elisia learn that listening to a friend when they need you and leaning on family when you need them is not a sign of weakness but a sign of courage and strength.
