= Swindle (2013 film) =

TV film by Jonathan Judge

- Promotional poster
- Genre: Comedy
- Based on: Swindle by Gordon Korman
- Written by: Eric Freiser; Bill Motz; Bob Roth
- Directed by: Jonathan Judge
- Starring: Jennette McCurdy; Noah Crawford; Chris O'Neal; Ciara Bravo; Fred Ewanuick; Sandy Robson; Gardiner Millar; Mitchell Duffield; Ariana Grande; Noah Munck
- Theme music composer: John Van Tongeren
- Countries of origin: United States; Canada
- Original language: English

Production
- Producers: Scott McAboy, Amy Sydorick
- Cinematography: Tom Harting
- Editor: Anita Brandt-Burgoyne
- Running time: 91 minutes
- Production company: Pacific Bay Entertainment (Vancouver)

Original release
- Network: Nickelodeon
- Release: August 24, 2013

Swindle is a 2013 television film starring Noah Crawford, Chris O'Neal, Jennette McCurdy, Noah Munck, Ariana Grande, Ciara Bravo, and Fred Ewanuick. Based on Gordon Korman's novel of the same name, the film tells the story of Griffin (Noah Crawford), a boy who retrieves his friend's valuable baseball card from an unscrupulous collectibles dealer with the help of his friends. Sneak peeks promoting the film aired on Nickelodeon during three Sam & Cat episodes and the final episode of Big Time Rush. The film premiered August 24, 2013 to an audience of over 4.2 million viewers. The film was released on DVD on March 19, 2014, and on Blu-ray on December 4, 2015.

== Plot ==
Teenager Griffin Bing is known for helping out friends in times of need. His friend Ben Dupree's family are preparing to sell their home as a result of Ben's father's failed inventions, one of which punches a hole in the wall, and the boys find a Honus Wagner baseball card inside. They sell it to pawn store owner Paul Swindell for $350.

The next morning Griffin and Ben see on the news that Swindell plans to sell it for $1.2 million, claiming to have found it himself. They confront Swindell who refuses to return the card. Griffin plans a heist to take the card back with a team consisting of cheerleader Amanda Benson, actress Savannah Westcott, and “the muscle” Darren Vader, but he rejects his younger sister, hacker Melissa's bid to join the team.

The team sneaks into Swindell's shop and Griffin finds the card, but worries that they would be prime suspects in the robbery and is forced to come up with another plan. He lets Melissa join the team after she saves them by hacking the shop's alarm. Wealthy businessman Anton Lefevre invites Swindell to auction off the card to him. Amanda, after inadvertently revealing her geeky nature to the group, borrows two "Captain Cybertor" action figures, one with the intended blue hair, and a rare accidentally red-headed version worth $80,000 from fellow geek friend Eddie Goldmeyer in exchange for a date.

Swindell plans to sell the card at the Lakeshore Hotel auction. Posing as Swindell's bratty daughter, Savannah obtains his crown suite room key, while Melissa hacks the hotel's system and gives Swindell a cheap room. Savannah and Darren let Swindell lie to them about the red-headed Captain Cybertor's actual price, and sell it to him for $10. Disguised as Lefevre, Griffin informs Swindell of a collector named Ivan Volkov who is searching for a red-headed Captain Cybertor.

Amanda switches the Cybertor boxes. Swindell sells it to Volkov for $80,000 before seeing through Ben's disguise and entering the gang's room. The gang tells him about the Cybertor switch and offer him the red-haired Cybertor in return for the Honus Wagner card, showing him footage of a furious Volkov. Swindell lunges for the red toy which falls off the balcony onto a couple's wedding cake. They all chase after it, crashing the wedding. Meanwhile, Ben's father is also at the hotel showing his new invention, the "iGotit", competing for a cash prize in an invention game show.

The gang retrieves the Cybertor and exchanges it with Swindell for the card. Swindell gives the Cybertor to Volkov who orders him to flee. Volkov is revealed to actually be Savannah's father, enlisted to help. The gang reveals themselves to Lefevre as the actual owners of the card and he invites them to the auction. While leaving, Swindell spills his case revealing a load of fake Honus Wagner cards with Swindell's face on them. He is presented with the $35,000 bill for the Crown Suite, much to his shock.

Ben rewards the gang with $25,000 for their help, explaining his family no longer need the money because his father's invention won the cash prize. Ben also pays for a real honeymoon for the wedding couple, pays for the group's college, and lets himself and his team spend the rest. A little girl asks for Griffin's help retrieving her rare-breed bird, worth $20,000, from a fake groomer. Griffin decides that the group should use the rest of the money to continue to foil swindlers.

== Cast ==
=== Main ===
- Noah Crawford as Griffin Bing ("The Brain")
- Chris O'Neal as Ben Dupree ("The Best Friend")
- Jennette McCurdy as Savannah Westcott ("The Actress")
- Noah Munck as Darren Vader ("The Muscle")
- Ariana Grande as Amanda "Mandy" Benson ("The Gymnast" / "Mandy the Mutant")
- Ciara Bravo as Melissa Bing, Griffin's younger sister ("The Hacker")
- Fred Ewanuick as Paul Swindell ("The Swindler")

=== Supporting ===
- Sandy Robson as Anton Leferve ("The Auctioner")
- Gardiner Millar as Ivan Volkov/Mr. Westcott, Savannah's father ("The Actor")
- Mitchell Duffield as Eddie Goldmeyer
- Ecstasia Sanders as Hotel Manager
- Chris Shields as Mr. Dupree
- Lucia Walters as Mrs. Dupree
- Farrah Aviva as The Bride
- Aurelio DiNunzio as The Bride's Father
- Phillip Lee as Joy The Jock
- Marrett Green as News Reporter

== Production ==
Swindle was filmed in Vancouver in the autumn of 2012.

== Reception ==
Emily Ashby of Common Sense Media gave the film a rating of 4 out of 5 stars, stating that "Nickelodeon alums team up in funny book-inspired heist film." David Hinckley gave the film a glowing review in New York Daily News.
