= Lulu Antariksa =

American actress and singer (born 1995)

- Born: Lauren Marie-Elizabeth Antariksa; August 22, 1995 (age 31); Los Angeles County, California
- Education: Valencia High School
- Occupations: Actress, singer
- Years active: 2002–present
- Spouse: Matthew Heller (m. 2023)

Lulu Antariksa (born August 22, 1995) is an American actress and singer. She is best known for her role in The CW show Legacies as Penelope Park. She also starred in the web series T@gged on the streaming website go90 as Rowan Fricks.

== Early life and education ==
Antariksa was born Lauren Marie-Elizabeth Antariksa on August 22, 1995 in Los Angeles County, California to an Indonesian father and a German mother. She graduated from Valencia High School in 2011.

== Career ==
Antariksa's breakout role was as Stevie Baskara in the 2012 Nickelodeon sitcom How to Rock. The show premiered February 4, 2012, and ran for 25 episodes. It was not renewed for a second season.

Antariksa's other television acting credits include American Family, According to Jim, ER, Head Cases, Monk, Zoey 101, and Gemini Division.

Antariksa played high-schooler Rowan Fricks in the go90 web series T@gged from 2016 to 2018.

She played the lead role in the 2018 post-apocalyptic thriller film What Still Remains alongside Colin O'Donoghue. The film received mixed reviews, with the Los Angeles Times' review stating: "...though it gets more tense in its second half, the movie overall is a bit too sedate. Still, a great cast... brings Mendoza’s ideas to life," while Rob Hunter for Film School Rejects wrote "Antariksa does good work and convinces as a young woman who’s fully able to care for herself while still being someone in need of human contact". Screenanarchy.com's review stated: "the lead performances are very solid" and Decider called the film "a hidden gem".

Antariksa was next seen in the role of Penelope Park in the first season of The CW television series Legacies. She then starred in the short film The Lonely Host, where one reviewer called her performance "impeccable" and appeared in the film Witch Hunt, which premiered at the South by Southwest film festival in March 2021.

== Personal life ==
On January 16, 2022, Antariksa became engaged to Matthew Heller. They married on December 2, 2023 in Los Angeles, California.

== Filmography ==
Television roles
Year	Title	Role	Notes
2002	American Family	Lina	Episode: "The Masked Eagle: Part 1"
2003	According to Jim	Madeline	Episode: "Slumber Party"
2004	ER	Anna	Episode: "Touch and Go"
2005	Head Cases	Erica	Episode: "Malpractice Makes Perfect"
2006	Monk	Whispering Child #1	Episode: "Mr. Monk and the Garbage Strike"
2008	Zoey 101	7th Grade Girl	Episode: "Anger Management"
2008	Gemini Division	Young Anna	Episode: "In the Region of Ice"
2012	How to Rock	Stevie Baskara	Main role (25 episodes)
2012	Figure It Out	Herself	Panelist; 7 episodes
2013	Jessie	Victoria Montesano	Episode: "Break-Up and Shape-Up"
2014	Kickin' It	Grey Cole	Episode: "Return of Spyfall"
2016	Crazy Ex-Girlfriend	Kayla	Episode: "I'm Back at Camp with Josh!"
2018	Impulse	Patty Yang	Episode: "Pilot"
2018–2019	Legacies	Penelope Park	7 episodes
2023	The Rookie: Feds	Cleo	1 episode
2023	Station 19	Sara Grossman	1 episode

Film roles
Year	Title	Role	Notes
2018	What Still Remains	Anna	Lead role
2019	The Lonely Host	Silvia	Short film
2020	Witch Hunt	Jen	
2020	Dear Veronica	Veronica	Short film

Web series roles
Year	Title	Role	Notes
2013–2015	Side Effects	Lexi Connolly	Main role
2016–2018	T@gged	Rowan Fricks	Main role (35 episodes)

Music video roles
Year	Title	Director	Notes
2012	"Lightning"	Kurt Hugo Schneider	Alex Goot's love interest
2012	"Maroon 5 Medley"	Kurt Hugo Schneider	Cameo
2012	"All Your Love"	Daniel Durston	Sung with Daniel Durston

== Discography ==
=== Singles ===
Title	Year	Album
"All Your Love"	2012	non-album single

=== Guest appearances ===
List of non-single guest appearances, with other performing artists, showing year released and album name
Title	Year	Other artist(s)	Album
"Sweet Little Pill"	2013	Chester See, Meg DeLacy, Cade Canon Ball, Finn Roberts	Side Effects: The Music, Episode 1 (Music From the Web Series)
"C'mon"	2013	Meg DeLacy	Side Effects: The Music, Episode 1 (Music From the Web Series)
"Hot n Cold"	2013	Keli Price	Side Effects: The Music, Episode 1 (Music From the Web Series)
"Bad Day"	2013	Chester See, Meg DeLacy, Cade Canon Ball, Finn Roberts	Side Effects: The Music, Episode 1 (Music From the Web Series)
"Try"	2013	Kelli Price	Side Effects: The Music, Episode 1 (Music From the Web Series)
"Cups"	2014	Cade Canon Ball, Meg DeLacy, Keli Price, Finn Roberts, Chester See	Side Effects: The Music, Episode 2 (Music From the Web Series)
"Boom Boom"	2014	Meg DeLacy	Side Effects: The Music, Episode 2 (Music From the Web Series)
"Put Yourself First"	2016	Crazy Ex-Girlfriend Cast, Marisa Davila, Jazz Raycole	Crazy Ex-Girlfriend: Season 1 (Original Television Soundtrack, Vol. 2)
