= Next Avengers: Heroes of Tomorrow =

2008 animated film

- Official poster
- Directed by: Jay Oliva; Gary Hartle
- Written by: Christopher L. Yost; Greg Johnson; Craig Kyle
- Produced by: Gary Hartle
- Starring: Noah Crawford; Aidan Drummond; Brenna O'Brien; Dempsey M. Pappion; Adrian Petriw; Tom Kane; Fred Tatasciore
- Edited by: Ken Cravens; Aeolan Kelly
- Music by: Guy Michelmore
- Production companies: Lionsgate; MLG Productions; Marvel Studios
- Distributed by: Lionsgate Home Entertainment
- Release date: September 2, 2008
- Running time: 78 minutes
- Country: United States
- Language: English

Next Avengers: Heroes of Tomorrow (or simply known as Next Avengers) is a 2008 American animated superhero film directed by Jay Oliva and Gary Hartle and starring the voices of Noah Crawford, Aidan Drummond, Brenna O'Brien, Dempsey M. Pappion, Adrian Petriw, Tom Kane and Fred Tatasciore. The fifth installment in the Marvel Animated Features (MAF) film series, it follows a group of young superheroes who are the children of the original group of Avengers and must defeat Ultron.

Next Avengers was released direct-to-video by Lionsgate Home Entertainment on September 2, 2008, and received mixed reviews from critics. From May to October 2010, Marvel Comics published a comic-book sequel to Next Avengers as the first storyline of Brian Michael Bendis's and John Romita Jr.'s Avengers (vol. 4).

== Premise ==
The Avengers are killed in a battle with Ultron, whose machine army takes control of the world. Before his death, Captain America tells Tony Stark to take the Avengers' children to a fortified refuge hidden above the Arctic Circle. Stark agrees, and he raises the four children—James, Torunn, Azari, and Pym—in secret, training them in the powers they inherited from their parents.

Twelve years later, Vision emerges from hiding and arrives at the refuge to inform Stark that he has found Hawkeye's son. While the curious children eavesdrop on the conversation, James accidentally activates the "Iron Avengers", a series of robots built by Stark that mimic the appearance and abilities of the deceased Avengers. Because they are programmed to defeat Ultron upon activation, they take off to do so. Ultron easily defeats the Iron Avengers, reprogramming them to follow his commands. Having traced their flight path, he locates the refuge and attacks. Stark dons his Iron Man armor and stalls Ultron long enough for the children to escape, but he is eventually subdued and captured.

Seeking to rescue Stark, the children infiltrate Ultra City, an Ultron-controlled city built upon the ruins of New York City. There, they encounter Francis Barton, the new Hawkeye, and agree to team up with his group of resistance fighters, the Scavengers. The five manage to free Stark from Ultron's citadel and escape with Betty Ross to the desert. There, they find Bruce Banner, who has been hiding in isolation to keep people safe from his rampages as the Hulk. When Banner refuses to help them, James comes up a plan to lure Ultron there to force Banner to transform and destroy the robot.

Ultron is successfully lured to their location, along with the Iron Avengers. The children fight the mechanical doubles of their parents, and manage to awaken the Hulk, who defeats the Iron Avengers. However, Ultron defeats Hulk and attacks the children, nearly killing them. Pym revives Hulk, who then ultimately destroys Ultron, ripping him in two, but is subdued by Ross before he can turn on the children. To stop Ultron from rebuilding himself, Torunn takes the two halves into space and throws them away. She nearly suffocates and freezes in the process, until being rescued by her father, Thor, who explains why he left her on Earth. Though Thor invites Torunn to join him in Asgard, she chooses to return to her family on Earth, and Thor sends her back to Earth in full Asgardian armor. With Ultron defeated, Stark and the children decide to liberate Ultra City from Ultron's remaining forces as the new Avengers.

== Cast ==
- Noah Crawford as James Rogers, son of Captain America and Black Widow
- Brenna O'Brien as Torunn Thorsdóttir, daughter of Thor and Sif
- Dempsey M. Pappion as Azari Munroe, son of Black Panther and Storm
- Aidan Drummond as Henry Pym Jr., son of Giant-Man and Wasp
- Adrian Petriw as Francis Barton, son of Hawkeye and Mockingbird
- Tom Kane as Iron Man and Ultron
- Fred Tatasciore as Hulk
- Shawn MacDonald as Vision
- Michael Adamthwaite as Thor
- Ken Kramer as Bruce Banner
- Nicole Oliver as Betty Ross

== Production ==
In January 2007, Craig Kyle, the vice president of creative development for animation at Marvel Studios, announced that an animated film titled Teen Avengers would be released as part of the Marvel Animated Features (MAF) series. The film was later retitled to Avengers Reborn, and then Next Avengers.

Next Avengers was written by Christopher Yost, a regular comic book writer for Marvel Comics. Speaking about the film in an interview on Marvel.com, Yost stated, "This is a fun adventure film, starring a really young cast of kids. But at the same time, the stakes are incredibly high, literally the survival of humanity. The situation is grim. And while all that seems like it could be a big bummer, we keep the kids so busy running for their lives that they don't have a lot of time to think about it."

== Release ==
In March 2008, a trailer for Next Avengers was released by Marvel. The film was released direct-to-video by Lionsgate Home Entertainment on September 2, 2008.

== Reception ==
David Cornelius of DVD Talk gave the film a negative review, criticizing its "unimpressive, repetitive action sequences" and "thin story." Nancy Davis Kho of Common Sense Media gave the film a positive review, praising its characters. Christopher Monfette of IGN also gave the film a positive review, calling it "a hugely watchable piece of animated entertainment."

== Sequel ==
From May to October 2010, Marvel Comics published a comic-book sequel to Next Avengers as the first storyline of Brian Michael Bendis's and John Romita Jr.'s Avengers (vol. 4). In the storyline, after a returned Ultron once again takes over the world, the Next Avengers fight back against him, under the leadership of Felicity Hardy / Spider-Girl (daughter of Peter Parker / Spider-Man and Felicia Hardy / Black Cat), Iron Man, and the Maestro.
