= What Still Remains =

- Directed by: Josh Mendoza
- Written by: Josh Mendoza
- Produced by: Nicholas Lazo; Gregg Meller; Josh Mendoza
- Starring: Lulu Antariksa; Colin O'Donoghue; Peter O'Brien; Dohn Norwood; Jeff Kober; Mimi Rogers
- Cinematography: Matthew Edwards
- Edited by: R. J. Daniel Hanna
- Music by: Jonathan Beard
- Production company: Strike the Sun Entertainment
- Distributed by: Gravitas Ventures
- Release date: August 10, 2018
- Running time: 91 minutes
- Country: United States
- Language: English
- Box office: $1,759

What Still Remains is a 2018 American post-apocalyptic thriller written and directed by Josh Mendoza. Lulu Antariksa stars as a young adult who loses her family. She comes upon a man from a religious commune, played by Colin O'Donoghue, who invites her to join them.

== Plot ==
A viral pandemic causes people to become violent and bestial. Twenty-five years later, young adult Anna and her brother, David, scavenge through the ruins of a nearby city. Spooked by the arrival of a ragged survivor, they flee back into the woods. David injures his ankle and urges Anna to leave him behind, believing their sick mother needs protection. Anna lies to her mother, assuring her that David will return shortly from a hunting trip. When Anna wakes the next morning, her mother is dead.

While gathering water, another stranger follows her back to her shack and introduces himself as Peter. After he agrees to surrender his weapons, Anna invites him in. Impressed with her self-sufficiency and skill, Peter reveals that he comes from a nearby religious commune. Noting the shack's religious iconography, Peter asks if she is a believer. Excited to find she was raised Christian, he invites her to join the commune. Although she initially declines, Anna accompanies Peter after remembering her mother's last wish – that she join other survivors.

On the way, Peter injures his leg in a trap. They bond further as Anna helps him. Peter explains that his parents either died or abandoned him, and the religious commune took him in. Encountering more ragged people, Peter explains they are Berserkers – pagans who worship the plague and act as if they are infected. Eventually, they come upon an old man at a campfire. Peter advises avoiding him, saying he may have set the trap. Anna frustrates Peter by hailing the old man. When they join him, his son comes out of hiding and disarms them. Anna angers Peter by inviting the men to the commune without consulting him. The old man says he has had bad dealings with the commune and pressures Anna to stay with them. Peter kills the men with a hidden knife, saying they would have raped Anna.

Although upset at what she believes to be Peter's unnecessary violence, Anna reluctantly surrenders her weapons to the religious commune when they arrive. Before she can be officially inducted into their community, she finds that a prisoner is to be judged. It turns out to be the man who chased her and David through the woods earlier, and Anna accuses him of killing David. Ben, the head of security, wants to release the prisoner, but Peter and Zack, the religious leader, vote to kill him for his sins. Anna is surprised to learn she must be baptised despite being a Christian. The other women in the commune seem to consider it a sort of marriage ceremony, further worrying her. When she expresses misgivings to Ben, he warns her that such talk could result in being labeled a heretic.

After the baptism, Peter forcefully kisses her. When Zack intimates that her duties include bearing children for the village elders, including Zack and Peter, Anna attempts to leave the commune. Peter stops her, saying God has given her to him. Ben interrupts them to warn that the Berserkers are massing for an attack. Peter, Ben, Anna, and several guards lead the prisoner out of the village, attempting to trade the prisoner's release for the commune's safety. Anna escapes when Berserkers attack them. She is stunned to find David among them. David hides her, and she watches him as he executes Ben. The Berserker who was their prisoner attempts to punish David, upset that he let his sister escape. Anna returns to save David, but he refuses to leave the Berserkers, who he says have taught him to become strong.

Confused, Anna leaves David behind, encountering Peter again. Peter points out that the commune has been razed, and he insists on starting a new one with Anna as his wife. When she refuses, he attempts to rape her. She kills him, and he forgives her with his last words. Back at the commune, Anna finds only one survivor – Judith, Zack's wife. Judith, who hid while the others were tortured, says the harsh world has changed everyone for the worse, but Anna says all involved have simply chosen to act immorally.

== Cast ==
- Lulu Antariksa as Anna
- Colin O'Donoghue as Peter
- Dohn Norwood as Ben
- Peter O'Brien as the prisoner
- Mimi Rogers as Judith
- Jeff Kober as Zack
- Roshon Fegan as David

== Production ==
What Still Remains is the feature film debut of writer-director Josh Mendoza. Composer Jonathan Beard had previously worked with producer Gregg Meller and Mendoza on a short film that was directed by Meller. To emphasize Anna's morality, Beard used acoustic strings for her theme. The religious commune and the Berserkers were given harsher instrumentation to highlight their more questionable morality.

== Release ==
Gravitas Ventures gave the film a limited release on August 10, 2018. It was released via video on demand four days later.

== Reception ==
Rotten Tomatoes, a review aggregator, reports that 90% of 10 surveyed critics gave the film a positive review; the average rating is 6.3/10. Noel Murray of the Los Angeles Times wrote the first half of the film, though slow-paced, shows why someone might join a cult. Murray says that the second half, though still "a bit too sedate", is a fascinating "what if" scenario. Writing for Starburst, John Higgins rated it 8/10 stars. Higgins said it has more hope and is more enjoyable than The Road courtesy of influence from Mad Max. Higgins concluded that it is "a great showcase for both the acting and technical teams". At Screen Anarchy, Peter Martin called the film "intriguing" and praised the film's atmosphere of dread, which avoids becoming too pushy or aggressive, though Martin said this may not play well to fans of more extreme exploitation films. Shawn Macomber of Rue Morgue wrote that although the themes are not unique, "it is sobering and thrilling to see such ideas and implications explored so seriously and with such panache". In rating it 2.5/5 stars, Patrick Bromley of Daily Dead called it "a perfectly solid genre thriller" that adds nothing new to the standard theme of "people are the worst monsters" found in most post-apocalyptic films.
