= Swindle (novel) =

2008 novel by Gordon Korman

- Author: Gordon Korman
- Cover artist: Jennifer Taylor
- Language: English
- Genre: Adventure; Children's heist
- Publisher: Scholastic
- Publication date: 2008
- Publication place: United States
- Media type: Print
- Pages: 252
- ISBN: 978-0-439-90345-5
- OCLC: 264041941
- LC Class: PZ7.K8369 Sw 2008
- Followed by: Zoobreak

Swindle is a 2008 children's novel by Gordon Korman. It is a caper story about the retrieval of a valuable baseball card. The book was the first of a series, followed by Zoobreak, Framed!, Showoff, Hideout, Jackpot, Unleashed, and Jingle. The book's cover signifies the plot's main thread about baseball cards, and features the characters running around a Baseball diamond.

== Plot ==
A smart, young boy named Griffin Bing decides to invite his entire class grade over for a sleepover in an old, abandoned house that is slated to be demolished after the town's plan for using as a new space in their town to make a skate park was thrown out because of their youth. However, on the night of the sleepover, only Griffin and his best friend Ben Slovak show up. Griffin finds a vintage baseball card, a 1920 Babe Ruth trading card worth hundreds of thousands of dollars. S. Wendell Palomino, or Swindle as the boys call him, stiffs them and gives Griffin only $120 for the card, half of which he gives to Ben. The boys attempt to steal the card from a safe in Palomino's shop, but it has been moved. After discovering that it is in his house, they group up with a few other people and decide to steal the card back in an elaborate heist. The team consists of Griffin, Ben, Melissa, Savannah, and Pitch, but Darren blackmails them into letting him also join the team. They steal the card, but leave a little evidence to their identity, and they are caught. However, news of Swindle's swindling comes out in the newspaper, and he does not press charges—instead, he gets a dose of karma and his shop does not see many visitors anymore. The card goes on auction, selling for $974,000, with the money eventually going to a town museum and the skate park.

== Characters ==
- Griffin Bing: a 6th grade school student, and ringleader of the card heist. Nicknamed 'The Man with the Plan".
- Ben Slovak: a 6th grade school student, Griffin's best friend, and lookout of the card heist. Ben becomes a lookout after revealing to Griffin that he has narcolepsy.
- Savannah Drysdale: a 6th grade school student. Savannah is great with animals and is brought onto the card heist to calm Swindle's dog Luthor.
- Antonia "Pitch" Benson: a 6th grade school student. Pitch is an expert climber and is brought onto the card heist to bring them onto the roof of Swindle's building.
- Logan Kellerman: a 6th grade school student. Logan is an actor who is trying to get into a commercial when he is brought onto the card heist to distract Swindle's neighbor.
- Melissa Dukakis a 6th grade school student. Melissa is a shy girl who was brought into the plan when Griffin Bing wants a girl specialized in computers.

== Film ==
A TV movie Swindle based on the novel was released on Nickelodeon in 2013.
