= U to U =

- Presented by: Ali Rivera; Sertrone Starks
- Opening theme: "U to U" Theme
- Country of origin: United States
- Original language: English
- No. of episodes: 20

Production
- Running time: 30 minutes

Original release
- Network: Nickelodeon
- Release: October 3, 1994 – 1996

U to U, sometimes labeled as U-2-U, is a Nickelodeon television series that aired weekly from 1994 to 1996. The show focused on displaying viewer-submitted work and ideas in their "Straight From U" segment where viewers were able to submit their work via mail, e-mail, fax, or telephone.

The show included short stories and comic strips written by viewers that were turned into animated shorts, and songs that were written and made into music videos. The interaction of series allowed viewers to play games over the phone, ask questions to celebrities, meet pen pals from other countries, and read letters aloud.

The show also featured an online presence in the Prodigy Internet service where viewers could create and send content for show consideration as well as participate in bulletin board conversations.
