= Chris O'Neal =

American actor

- Born: Christopher Richard O'Neal; April 4, 1994 (age 32)
- Education: Teaneck High School
- Occupation: Actor
- Years active: 2011–present

Christopher Richard O'Neal (born April 4, 1994) is an American actor. He is known for his role in the 2012 Nickelodeon television series How to Rock.

== Early life ==
O'Neal, a resident of Teaneck, New Jersey, attended Teaneck High School. He appeared in several commercials and in a Saturday Night Live skit before getting his first recurring role.

== Career ==
O'Neal's first major role was in the 2012 Nickelodeon comedy series How to Rock, playing the role of Kevin Reed, a high school freshman who is the drummer for the band Gravity 5. The same year he also co-hosted the Nickelodeon series, You Gotta See This, with Noah Crawford.

In 2013 O'Neal had a starring role in the 2013 Nickelodeon television film Swindle. In 2016 he was cast in a starring role on the 2017 Netflix drama series Greenhouse Academy.

In 2014 O'Neal released his EP Just getting started.

== Personal life ==
On March 16, 2026, O'Neal was arrested for participating in a home invasion with two other people in Malibu, California.

== Filmography ==
Television and film roles
Year	Title	Role	Notes
2012	How to Rock	Kevin Reed	Main role; as Christopher O'Neal
2012	You Gotta See This	Himself	Co-host
2013	Swindle	Ben Dupree	Television movie
2015	Raven's Touch	Jack	Film
2015	K.C. Undercover	River	Episode: "All Howl's Eve"
2016	Here We Go Again	Kevin	Episode: "Second Time Around"
2017–2020	Greenhouse Academy	Daniel Hayward	Main role
2018	Colin in Black & White	Dwayne	Episode: "Road Trip"
2018, 2020	5th Ward	Bam	Main role
