= Framed (Korman novel) =

2010 novel by Gordon Korman

- Author: Gordon Korman
- Cover artist: Jennifer Taylor
- Language: English
- Series: Swindle
- Genre: Adventure; Children's
- Publisher: Scholastic
- Publication date: 2010
- Publication place: United States
- Media type: Print
- Pages: 234
- ISBN: 978-0-545-17849-5
- OCLC: 55356980
- LC Class: PZ7.K8369 Fr 2010
- Preceded by: Zoobreak
- Followed by: Showoff

Framed is a 2010 children's novel written by Gordon Korman. It is the third installation in the Swindle series.

== Plot summary ==
The story takes place in Cedarville, while 'The Man with the Plan' Griffin Bing is having a hard time adjusting to his school's new atmosphere, which is more like a strict boot camp than a middle school. His new football fanatic principal, Dr. Egan, does not like Griffin, due to his past. To make matters worse, somebody has stolen the priceless Super Bowl ring that was in the school's showcase, with Griffin's retainer that he recently lost left in its place. Things only go from bad to worse when Griffin is accused of stealing it by Egan, and Griffin is sent to a state school for juvenile delinquents. Griffin realizes he has been framed by somebody and calculates a list of suspects:

- Dr. Egan, (dubbed Dr. Evil) the principal who hates Griffin and could gain the ring as a football collector's item, as he loves the sport.
- Celia White, a nosy reporter who is digging up dirt on Griffin. She often twists his words, and she will do anything to make him look guilty, possibly to gain a promotion.
- Darren Vader, a burly boy who annoys Griffin. He could steal the ring after finding Griffin's retainer in order to gain profit. His motive for framing Griffin would be to distract the police from him. He was one of the seven in Swindle to help Griffin retrieve a Babe Ruth Baseball card.
- Tony Bartholomew, a boy who claims he is the rightful owner of the Super Bowl ring.

Griffin tries to get the suspects through a metal detector at the courthouse after sending them an anonymous e-mail stating that a buyer was interested in purchasing a valuable possession that "recently" came to them. Griffin unfortunately discovers that Dr. Egan is the only suspect left. Logan, Griffin's friend and amateur actor, agrees to get to know Egan's daughter so he can search the house and find the ring, getting him off the hook. The plan fails when they discover Egan does not have the ring. Griffin is placed under house arrest, where his friends meet him via video chat and formulate a final plan to clear their friend's name. Savannah, the animal lover of the group, finds that a type of rat is attracted to shiny objects and may have found Griffin's lost retainer then swapped it out with the ring. Melissa, the computer expert, hacks into Griffin's house arrest system that allows him to leave the house without the alarm coming off while his parents are out. At the school during its play, Hail Caesar!, Griffin leads Egan to the pack rat's nest and clears his name. He is then raced home and resets his house arrest anklet as his parents arrive. Egan, who got Griffin home in time, clears up matters and apologizes to Griffin, saying that he was wrong to judge him. Also, Celia White shows up in an attempt to get a story on him. Before she can twist the words, however, Egan makes her stop and makes sure she won't be doing it again. After this, Griffin asks the court if it will take a truly good-hearted friend, Sheldon Brickhaus (dubbed Shank), out of the state school, so he can have a chance at life. They accept and it is implied that life will be better for Griffin and his friends.

== Sequel ==
A sequel called Showoff was released in January 2012, and it was followed by

- Hideout (published in 2013),
- Jackpot (published in 2014),
- Unleashed (January 2015), and
- Jingle (published in 2016), being the most recent in the series.
