= Noah Crawford =

American actor and singer (born 1994)

- Born: Noah Caleb Crawford; October 13, 1994 (age 31); Oklahoma City, Oklahoma, U.S.
- Occupations: Actor, singer
- Years active: 2005–present

Noah Caleb Crawford (born October 13, 1994) is an American actor and singer. He is best known as Nelson Baxter from his time in the Nickelodeon sitcom How to Rock, as well as portraying Young Earl Hickey in My Name Is Earl.

== Life and career ==
Crawford was born in Oklahoma City, Oklahoma to Rich (who commutes between Oklahoma and California while running a pet sales business) and Jennifer Crawford. He has 3 younger sisters: Hannah, Oliviah and Bellah, and an older sister Lindsey who lives in Norman, Oklahoma with her husband Josh and daughter Lucca. He started acting lessons in Oklahoma when he was only 5 years old.

From 2005 to 2009, he appeared as Young Earl in the sitcom My Name Is Earl, for which he earned a Young Artist Award nomination in 2007. Shortly after he did the voice work for James Rogers (the son of Captain America and The Black Widow) in the direct-to-DVD film Next Avengers: Heroes of Tomorrow. In addition, he has guest starred in the television series Pair of Kings and True Jackson, VP. In 2012, Crawford co-starred as Nelson Baxter in the Nickelodeon sitcom How to Rock, which was produced for one season.

== Filmography ==
Year	Series	Role	Notes
2005–2009	My Name Is Earl	Young Earl	Recurring role
2006	Abe & Bruno	Shawn	
2008	Happy Holidays	Young Kirby	Scenes deleted
2008	Next Avengers: Heroes of Tomorrow	James Rogers	Voice
2009	Land of the Lost	Teenager	
2010	The Killer Inside Me	Mike (at 15)	
2010	Trust	Tyler	
2010	Pair of Kings	No-Beard	Episode: "Oh Brother, Where Arr Thou?"
2011	True Jackson, VP	Stan	Episode: "True Mall'"
2012	How to Rock	Nelson Baxter	Main Cast
2012–2013	Figure It Out	Himself	Panelist (Episode 10, 14, 26, 35, 37, 45, 46)
2012	You Gotta See This	Himself	Co-host with How to Rock co-star Chris O'Neal
2013	Swindle	Griffin Bing	Lead Role
2014	Major Crimes	Conner	Episode: "Sweet Revenge"
2015	K.C. Undercover	Gabriel	
2015	Criminal Minds	Matt Franks	
2016	Rizzoli & Isles	Nicky Bartulis	
2016	The Real O'Neals	Drew	
2019	Bizaardvark	Ernie	Episode: "Bernie's Cousin Ernie"
2024	Snowpiercer	Rat	Recurring role; Season 4

== Awards and nominations ==
Year	Award	Category	Work	Outcome
2007	Young Artist Award	Recurring Young Actor	My Name Is Earl	Nominated
