= Zoobreak =

2009 children's novel by Gordon Korman

- Author: Gordon Korman
- Cover artist: Jennifer Taylor
- Language: English
- Series: Swindle
- Genre: Comedy; Mystery; Children's novel
- Publisher: Scholastic
- Publication date: 2009
- Publication place: United States
- Media type: Print
- Pages: 230
- ISBN: 9780545124997
- OCLC: 741464474
- LC Class: PZ7.K8369 Zoo 2009
- Preceded by: Swindle
- Followed by: Framed

Zoobreak is a 2009 children's novel by Gordon Korman and is the sequel to the 2008 book Swindle. The book was released in September 2009 by Scholastic and follows Savannah as she has to rescue her monkey after it has been kidnapped by the corrupt zoo keeper of a zoo boat. The entry was followed by Framed! in 2010. Zoobreak won an Arkansas's Charlie May Simon Children's book Award in 2012.

== Plot ==
Savannah has lost her pet monkey named Cleopatra. Griffin and his friend Ben are trying to help her get it back, but they have no such luck until they take a field trip to a zoo boat that has made a stop in Long Island. Savannah makes a scene when she sees the zoo's newest attraction, Eleanor, whom she believes is her monkey, Cleo. Griffin and Ben believe her after they see just how nasty the zookeeper, Mr. Nastase, really is. Griffin and Ben must gather the team of the strength, animal smarts, acting skills, the team leader, height, computer skills, and climbing. They do not realize the zoo is heavily guarded by a seemingly mean security guard named Klaus. Soon, they find out all the animals are actually pets stolen by Nastase, and Klaus knows nothing about it. So, now they must free all the animals from Nastase's cruel hands and get Cleo back. But the plan fails and they must not only free the entire zoo, but keep the animals hidden until they find a "better" zoo to stash the animals, and also stop Nastase from stealing all the animals from both zoos.

== Reception ==
Reception for Zoobreak was mostly positive, with Kirkus Reviews giving a positive review and calling it "a Disney movie waiting to happen". The School Library Journal also praised the entry, saying that although parts of the book were predictable Korman made his main characters likable.
