= How to Rock =

2012 American television sitcom

- Genre: Teen sitcom
- Created by: Jim O'Doherty
- Based on: How to Rock by Meg Haston
- Developed by: David M. Israel
- Showrunner: David M. Israel
- Starring: Cymphonique Miller; Samantha Boscarino; Max Schneider; Lulu Antariksa; Halston Sage; Noah Crawford; Christopher O'Neal
- Opening theme: "Only You Can Be You" by Cymphonique Miller
- Composers: Toby Gad; Jared Cotter; Cymphonique & P.R. Miller
- Country of origin: United States
- Original language: English
- No. of seasons: 1
- No. of episodes: 25

Production
- Executive producers: David M. Israel; Gina Girolamo; Leslie Morgenstein
- Producer: Melanie Patterson
- Cinematography: Alan Walker
- Editors: Cheryl Campsmith; Cole Kennedy; George Mandl
- Running time: 24 and 46 minutes
- Production companies: On the Emmus Productions; Alloy Entertainment; Nickelodeon Productions

Original release
- Network: Nickelodeon
- Release: February 4 – December 8, 2012

How to Rock is an American teen sitcom created by Jim O'Doherty and developed by David M. Israel that ran on Nickelodeon from February 4 to December 8, 2012. It stars singer Cymphonique Miller, who previously sang the theme song for Nickelodeon's Winx Club. It also co-stars Samantha Boscarino, Max Schneider, Lulu Antariksa, Halston Sage, Noah Crawford, and Christopher O'Neal. The series is based on the 2011 book How to Rock Braces and Glasses by Meg Haston, which was published by Little Brown Books For Young Readers and Alloy Entertainment. The series was officially green-lit on May 23, 2011, with a 20-episode production order, later increased to 26. Two of the ordered episodes were merged into a special episode, so 25 episodes actually aired. The series began filming in August 2011. It is the first television sitcom to be produced by Alloy Entertainment.

It was confirmed by the series' showrunner Israel on August 26, 2012, that How to Rock would not be returning for a second season.

== Premise ==
Kacey Simon (Cymphonique Miller) is a popular girl who was once mean, but whose status goes down after she must briefly wear braces and glasses. Ignored by her fellow mean girls, Kacey finds a new way to express herself through music by becoming the lead singer of the pop/hip-hop band, Gravity 4 with Stevie (Lulu Antariksa), Zander (Max Schneider), Nelson (Noah Crawford), and Kevin (Christopher O'Neal). The success of the band, now renamed Gravity 5, begins a rivalry with Kacey's former group The Perfs, a rival band featuring her former friends, and now archrivals, Molly (Samantha Boscarino) and Grace (Halston Sage).

== Characters ==
=== Main ===
- Kacey Simon (Cymphonique Miller) is the former leader of the Perfs ("perf" is the abbreviation for "perfect") and the lead singer of Gravity 5. Kacey is the co-leader of Gravity 5 with Zander. After getting glasses and braces, her social status takes a dive. Although she originally ridiculed the Gravity 5 band members, Zander convinces her to join. Kacey is confident, bold, self-centered, and now on a campaign to take her new friends and bandmates to the top of the school social ladder. With the help of her new friends, Kacey learns to look past appearances and accept herself and others as they are. Her and Molly's last names are references to 1960s singing duo Simon & Garfunkel.
- Molly Garfunkel (Samantha Boscarino) is the new leader of the Perfs and the antagonist of the series. Molly is competitive, popular, and a talented singer/dancer. She is Kacey's former best friend and it is implied that Kacey treated Molly badly when she was the leader of the Perfs. Molly is insecure and jealous of Kacey, and often tries to humiliate her and Gravity 5. Her best friend is Grace King, whose kindness serves as a counterpoint to Molly's snarky nature. Over the course of the series, she becomes kinder towards the Gravity 5 members, partly due to her crush on Zander and her reconciliation with Kacey.
- Zander Robbins (Max Schneider) is the new kid at Brewster High School who acts as the guitarist, keyboardist, and DJ for Gravity 5 as well as its leader. Zander is cool, handsome, and sometimes vain. A running gag in the show is that he can never stop staring at himself in the mirror or combing his hair. Because he is new, he is oblivious to the Perf's bullying behavior and is more inclined to believe the best in them. In the episode "How to Rock a High School Sensation," Zander is shown to have a crush on Molly. In "How to Rock a Yearbook," it is shown that Zander constantly takes bad yearbook pictures and has a younger sister.
- Stevie Baskara (Lulu Antariksa) is Gravity 5's smart, sarcastic, tough bass player. The Perfs always call her "Loserberry," much to her annoyance. She is a tomboy and has a number of unfeminine habits, including burping on command. She has four older brothers, and the only clothes she gets offered are sweatpants and sweat socks. Throughout the series, she works in food service at Danny Mango's and the school cafeteria. In addition to playing the bass, Stevie also plays the violin and the cello. Stevie was not featured in the 2011 novel.
- Grace King (Halston Sage) is Molly's gorgeous but naïve sidekick, as well as the second-in-command of the Perfs. Although she tries to emulate Molly's cruel attitude, Grace can never find it in herself to be mean to others. In "How to Rock Cee Lo," Grace temporarily leaves the Perfs due to Molly's mean attitude but later reconciles with Molly. She has a mutual crush on Nelson.
- Nelson Baxter (Noah Crawford) is the tech-savvy, sci-fi loving keyboard player for Gravity 5. He is also Kevin's best friend. Nelson gets socially awkward and tongue-tied around girls,. Nelson is the treasurer of the science club and has a love for video games. He has a mutual crush on Grace. Along with Kevin, he was briefly addicted to the video game Furious Pigeons, a parody of Angry Birds. In "How to Rock a Lunch Table," it is shown that Nelson still sleeps with his baby blanket, which he calls Captain Blankie. In "How to Rock a Birthday Party," Kacey and Nelson are revealed to have the same birthday and to have known each other since grade school.
- Kevin Reed (Christopher O'Neal) is the drummer for Gravity 5 and Nelson's best friend. He is obsessed with food and is socially awkward with the girls. He is athletic enough to join various sports teams, but too lazy to be a good player. He is demonstrated to be a terrible liar and a bit of a nervous wreck. He shares Nelson's love of video games and also loves to make and hear bad puns; he often gives Nelson a high-five when they hear one. He has a crush on Kacey, but also finds Molly attractive. In the episode "How to Rock an Election," Kevin is shown to be somewhat of a skilled rapper. In "How to Rock a Lunch Table," it is shown that he still sleeps with an old stuffed animal named "Mikey the Manatee."

=== Recurring ===
- Andy Bartlet (Jacob Houston) is an odd but well-meaning student who goes to Brewster High School. Most of the school sees him as a geek, but despite his quirks, the Gravity 5 members see him as a dependable friend. He tries to make friends but has many disgusting habits that turn others away from him. He is shown to like "Furious Pigeons" along with Nelson and Kevin, and he is impressed by Stevie's burping skills. In "How to Rock Cee Lo," he auditioned to be the new lead singer of Gravity 5.
- Mr. March (Kirk Fox) is the history teacher at Brewster High School. His catchphrase is "What's up?!" and he often tries to talk like a young person. He serves as a mentor for the Gravity 5 members.
- Iverne (Fuschia J. Walker) is the ill-tempered school lunch lady of Brewster High School. She has an unrequited crush on Mr. March. The food she makes is often reviled by the students.
- Danny Mango (T.J. Miller) is the eccentric owner and namesake of Danny Mango's, a fruit smoothie store in the mall. He also works as a driving instructor. He is Stevie's boss, as well as Kacey's temporary boss in "How to Rock a Part-Time Job." He has a habit of referring to himself in the third person at all times.
- Dahlia (HaleyAnn Johnson) is a student who goes to Brewster High School. She has an obsessive crush on Zander. She served as a moderator of the Class President debate and works on the school newspaper.
- Mall Cop (Jason Sims-Prewitt) is the frustrated security guard at the mall where Stevie works. He is occasionally irritated by the antics of Gravity 5, especially Zander. He was also a Security Guard for Cee Lo Green at his concert.

== Episodes ==
No.	Title	Directed by	Written by	Original release date	Prod. code	US viewers (millions)
1	"How to Rock Braces and Glasses"	Eric Dean Seaton	Story by : Jim O'Doherty; Teleplay by : Jim O'Doherty	February 4, 2012	101	3.3
After getting braces and glasses, Kacey Simon (Cymphonique Miller) falls from the popular group. She forges unlikely friendships with the members of the band Gravity 4 featuring Stevie (Lulu Antariksa), Zander (Max Schneider), Kevin (Christopher O'Neal), and Nelson (Noah Crawford). As lead singer, Kacey takes Gravity 5's musical success to new heights while igniting a musical rivalry with The Perfs featuring her former best friends and fellow performers, Molly (Samantha Boscarino) and Grace (Halston Sage). Note: There was an early release of this episode posted on the iTunes Store for free. Songs featured: "Only You Can Be You", "Rules for Being Popular", and "I'll Be There" Guest star: Kirk Fox
2	"How to Rock a Messy Bet"	Roger S. Christiansen	Nina Bargiel	February 4, 2012	105	3.2
When Gravity 5's hangout is messy beyond repair, they start a bet that challenges each of them to give up their favorite habit and the last one standing gets to watch the others clean. Kacey thinks giving up her phone will be a piece of cake. Stevie is forced to pair up with The Perfs for chemistry without "slamming" them, and gets help from Molly, who convinces Kacey's crush and one of the hottest boys in school, Tony Cardella, to text her, which he does to ask her out. Kevin and Nelson try to find a way to satisfy their need of their favorite game, "Furious Pidgeon". Zander has to go on without looking in a mirror, as he's always "checking himself out" and showing a little vanity. Kacey breaks everyone in the band except for Stevie. Then, Molly, knowing that Kacey won't break anytime soon, begins to text Tony, trying to make Kacey uncomfortable, but Stevie defends Kacey from further harassment by shooting a nasty comment at Molly (which is slamming, meaning she lost the bet). In the end, Kacey wins the bet, and she and Tony head off to get smoothies at the mall happily. Kacey then tells Tony that he should come to her gig, which he does. Note: The episode's fictional game, Furious Pigeons, is a parody of Angry Birds. Song featured: "Go With Gravity"
3	"How to Rock a Guest List"	Rich Correll	Bill Martin & Mike Schiff	February 11, 2012	106	2.9
When Justin Cole, the most popular guy in school, hands out invitations for his party, the biggest party of the year, Kacey stands up for Gravity 5 to be invited too. But now, she feels pressure to make sure they fit in with the cool kids because Molly and Grace said that if her bandmates aren't cool enough, they'll brand her as a loser. Launching into action, Kacey schools her bandmates on being cool, but later learns that asking her friends to change is the wrong approach, because at the party, things go downhill: Zander starts to get sweaty, Kevin and Nelson are fooling around (such as wanting to get into the V.I.P. area by forcing Zander to fake an injury and playing with the chocolate fountain), and Stevie, learning the Justin likes her and finds her cool, starts leg wrestling him. After Kacey freaks out, Justin nearly kicks her out, saying her band mates are already cool and that she's actually being uncool by trying to change them, and despite Kacey constantly trying to force them into being something they're not, her friends stand by her and stick up for her, saying that if Kacey's out, they're out. Song featured: "Hey Now" Guest star: Jack Depew
4	"How to Rock a Statue"	Rich Correll	Erica Spates & Sam Littenberg-Weisberg	February 18, 2012	107	2.6
When Zander enters a school art contest to impress his latest crush Dana Blaire, Kacey offers to "help" by being his muse. Unfortunately her attempts to help are anything but helpful and when she breaks Zander's magnum opus, she must quickly find a way to recreate his piece of art. She decides to paint herself silver and replace the broken statue with herself, but Zander eventually finds out. While posing as Zander's piece of art, Kacey over-hears Molly and Grace insulting Zander behind his back, claiming he made the statue all wrong, and Molly saying she never actually painted her self-portrait because she paid her art teacher to do it for her. So, Andy Bartlet (Jacob Houston) wins. Meanwhile, Stevie, Kevin and Nelson have a bet when Kevin and Nelson try to prove that they are smarter than Stevie's science project: hamster intelligence. Guest star: Kirk Fox
5	"How to Rock a Music Video"	Roger S. Christiansen	Yamara Taylor & Lena D. Waithe	February 25, 2012	104	2.7
After The Perfs' music video goes viral on the internet, skyrocketing them to fame (complete with a merchandising line at school), Kacey rallies Gravity 5 to make a video of their own to out-do the Perfs. However, Kacey's bossy stubbornness reaches new heights and causes a rift in Gravity 5. Kacey rejoins with the Perfs, but she realizes that she's just being used (after Molly makes Kacey get coffee for the rest of Perfs).Kacey makes up with Gravity 5 and make a music video that becomes more popular than the Perfs video. Songs featured: "Good Life" and "Rules for Being Popular"
6	"How to Rock an Election" "How to Rock with Big Time Rush"	Adam Weissman	Bill Martin & Mike Schiff	March 3, 2012	114	3.2
Kacey is running against Molly for class president, and the polls show that the race is very close. In order to capture the nerd vote, Kacey convinces Kevin to run and then drop out at the last minute, giving his supporters to her. Kacey is so confident this plan is going to work that she is already planning the Victory party and has promised that she will get the band Big Time Rush to come perform. But something happens to Kevin when he gets a taste of popularity, and the race is actually between Kacey, Molly and Kevin now. Kacey realizes that her friendship is more important than winning- she pulls through to support Kevin and even comes through on her promise to bring BTR to their school. Special guest stars: Big Time Rush - Kendall Schmidt, James Maslow, Carlos Pena & Logan Henderson as themselves Song featured: "Music Sounds Better with U" (by Big Time Rush) Note: This is the second time that Cymphonique Miller worked with Big Time Rush, the first time was on the Big Time Rush episode, "Big Time Girl Group".
7	"How to Rock a Newscast"	David DeLuise	Bill Martin & Mike Schiff	March 17, 2012	112	N/A
The gang is in charge of the school news broadcast and both Kacey and Molly are vying to be Head Reporter. As the producer, Stevie gets to choose and picks Molly because she's generally more serious. Kacey feels slighted and sets out to prove that she can do a better job. Stevie decides she'll let them compete, but when Molly files a hard-hitting report about the chlorine content in the school pool, Kacey can't find a story big enough to match it. Desperate to beat Molly, Kacey goes live with a story based on hearsay and sends the whole school into a mad panic. When Kacey realizes that the fungus that she found was just mold, not at all harmful, she feels pressure from her bandmates to tell Stevie the truth, especially since the jocks from the football team are allowed to work out in Gravity 5's practice room due to the gym being shut down. Songs featured: "You Want News, Babe" and "Today's School News" Guest star: Kirk Fox
8	"How to Rock a Prank"	Eric Dean Seaton	Lena D. Waithe & Yamara Taylor	March 24, 2012	108	2.4
Kacey has a crush on a senior boy, Dean Hollis. Just as she's about to get a date with him, Molly pulls a prank, leaving Kacey humiliated. Gravity 5 pulls a revenge prank on The Perfs, but it backfires, leaving Kacey and Zander's hands glued together. The situation threatens to sabotage Kacey's big date with Dean.
9	"How to Rock a Secret Agent"	Eric Dean Seaton	David Sacks	March 31, 2012	103	4.4
Kacey is determined to outshine Molly at the school dance. She sends Stevie undercover to find out what Molly will be wearing. Then, The Perfs over-shine Stevie, Stevie takes the form of an actual Perf and forgetting all about her friends. When Stevie realizes she's being used, she comes up with a plan of her own. Meanwhile, the boys have a bet; whoever doesn't get a date to the dance has to wear a dress to it. After Zander slips up and a girl turns him down and goes with Kevin, he is devastated, as no girl ever rejected him in his life. Kacey goes to the dance with Nelson to make Zander wear a dress. As Stevie and Molly start spending time together, Grace feels left out, as she used to be Molly's right hand girl, but now Molly is ignoring her completely. Stevie goes back to Gravity 5, and Grace is once again the second Perf. At the dance it turns out that Stevie had planned to have Kacey and Molly wear the same dress, which works. Unfortunately, Zander is also wearing the same dress. Song featured: "Move With the Crowd"
10	"How to Rock a Lunch Table"	Eric Dean Seaton	Steven James Meyer	April 7, 2012	102	2.5
Kacey misses sitting at her old lunch table and will stop at nothing to take it back from The Perfs. Meanwhile, Kevin and Nelson lead a protest against the lunch ladies, who turn all of their favorites foods into gross stews. Song featured: "Go With Gravity"
11	"How to Rock a Birthday Party"	Sheldon Epps	Erica Spates & Sam Littenberg-Weisberg	April 14, 2012	111	2.6
Kacey and Nelson have the same birthday, so Kacey decides to share her birthday party with him. But in planning the party, Kacey ignores Nelson's input, leaving him feeling hurt, and her feeling like a bad friend. Song featured: "Last 1 Standing"
12	"How to Rock a Part-Time Job"	Eric Dean Seaton	David Sacks	April 21, 2012	109	N/A
Stevie helps Kacey get a part-time job at Danny Mangos to pay her mom back for a huge credit card bill. However, when Kacey finds out that employees can get free smoothies, she accidentally gives away too many free smoothies, getting herself and Stevie fired. Meanwhile, Zander tries to play his ukulele at the mall without the mall cop finding out, and Nelson and Kevin try to give out coupons from the places they are working at. Guest star: T.J. Miller as Danny Mango Song featured: "Last 1 Standing"
13	"How to Rock Halloween"	Rich Correll	Nina Bargiel	April 28, 2012	116	2.3
Halloween has arrived and Kacey is torn between going trick-or-treating with Gravity 5 or going to a Perf party. After dozing off, Kacey ends up in a dream where the Perfs have turned into vampires, Gravity 5 transforms into werewolves and Kacey is "the chosen one". The two groups begin to compete for Kacey's allegiance and now she must choose which identity is hers. Song featured: "War on the Dance Floor" Guest star: Kirk Fox
14	"How to Rock a Basketball Team"	Adam Weissman	Nina Bargiel	May 5, 2012	113	2.0
When every kid in school is required to join a sports team, Kacey reluctantly joins Stevie's basketball team, only to discover she's really good. But Kacey's drive to win puts their friendship to the test! Meanwhile, Nelson creates a snacking machine for him, Kevin, and Zander. When the guys accidentally set it on warp speed, Nelson and the guys are forced to destroy it. Song featured: "How You Do It" Guest star: Kirk Fox
15	"How to Rock a Love Song"	Sean Lambert	David Sacks	June 30, 2012	115	2.8
Zander is writing a love song, but he won't let anyone see the lyrics until he's done. Kacey and Stevie are too curious to wait, so they sneak a peek. Each of them becomes convinced that they are Zander's secret crush, but he reveals to them that it's really about his dog "Lady" by singing the song to them (much to their surprise). Meanwhile, Kevin and Nelson accidentally break Kevin's drums while on a zip line, so they have to try to figure out a way to raise money in order to replace it. Song featured: "Lady"
16	"How to Rock Cee Lo"	Eric Dean Seaton	David M. Israel	August 18, 2012	123–124	2.1
The Perfs have front row seats for a Cee Lo Green concert; Gravity 5 can't get tickets. Masquerading as arena employees, Gravity 5 sneaks into the concert through the back way, but when security catches on, they have to run for their lives. Cee Lo Green decides he wants Gravity 5 to tour with him. But there's a misunderstanding – the star only wants Kacey. Gravity 5 is happy for Kacey, but the Battle of the Bands is approaching and now they have no singer. Note: While this was broadcast as one episode it counts as two for the production order. Songs featured: "Rules for Being Popular", "All About Tonight" and "Crazy" Special guest star: Cee Lo Green Guest star: Kirk Fox
17	"How to Rock a Singing Telegram"	Adam Weissman	David Sacks	September 22, 2012	125	2.0
Stevie is too shy to ask her crush to the school dance so Kacey asks him for her through a singing telegram and gets an unexpected response. Zander, Kevin and Nelson are all assigned telegrams that wildly backfire. Song featured: "Rock with Me" Guest star: Kirk Fox
18	"How to Rock a Yearbook"	Roger S. Christiansen	David Sacks	September 29, 2012	118	1.9
Gravity 5 tries to get their own yearbook page, just like The Perfs have. The Perfs, of course, are two steps ahead. You'll also learn why Zander is so secretive about last year’s yearbook from his old school, and why Stevie and Kevin will stop at nothing to uncover the secret. Meanwhile, the Perfs get many more people to join Gravity 5, right before their performance. Can Kacey and the gang find out a way to make it work? Song featured: "Just Do Me"
19	"How to Rock High School Sensation"	Sheldon Epps	Nina Bargiel	October 13, 2012	119	2.0
Gravity 5 and the Perfs team up to make an audition tape for the TV show "High School Sensation." The whole group is crushed when Kevin forgets to send their tape, so he tracks down the show's host (Romeo Miller) to fix his mistake. Song featured: "Me, Myself and I" Guest stars: Romeo Miller, Kirk Fox Note: Romeo Miller is Cymphonique's brother.
20	"How to Rock a Good Deed"	David DeLuise	Bill Martin & Mike Schiff	October 20, 2012	120	2.1
Kacey is not happy that the Perfs' volunteer project is getting more attention than Gravity 5's project, so she uses a foot injury to get special attention. When her friends find out, they plot revenge. Song featured: "Just Do Me"
21	"How to Rock Camping"	Shannon Flynn	Erica Spates & Sam Littenberg-Weisberg	October 27, 2012	121	1.7
On a school camping trip, Gravity 5 and the Perfs have to rough it like prisoners to get a passing grade. Out in the wild, it's not Kacey or Molly but Grace who has the skills to lead, and her leadership skills get tested. Song featured: "Only You Can Be You" (Acoustic) Guest star: Kirk Fox
22	"How to Rock a Fashion Victim"	Sean Lambert	Bill Martin & Mike Schiff	November 3, 2012	122	1.9
Kacey is used to being great at everything, but when she has to design her own clothing line as part of a competition to win an internship with a famous designer, she doesn't rock the competition as much as she had hoped. Meanwhile, Kevin opens a mobile bistro at lunch time with Nelson and Zander after being fed up with the school's nasty lunches.
23	"How to Rock a Uniform"	Shannon Flynn	Bill Martin & Mike Schiff	November 10, 2012	117	1.8
The principal (Greg Grunberg) imposes a new school-uniform policy in response to Kacey and Molly's intense fashion rivalry, and the girls must join forces to get it overthrown. Guest star: Greg Grunberg, Kirk Fox
24	"How to Rock a Tennis Ball"	Sheldon Epps	David Sacks	December 1, 2012	126	1.6
Kacey has the responsibility of keeping an eye on Mr. March's tennis ball — until she loses it and has to get it back. Guest stars: Kirk Fox, T.J. Miller
25	"How to Rock Christmas"	Neal Israel	Sam Littenberg-Weisberg & Erica Spates	December 8, 2012	110	1.6
Nelson and Kevin get jobs taking pictures of children with Santa Claus while dressed as elves. Gravity 5 gets stuck in Danny Mango's during the Christmas holiday. They try crawling through the vents to get out, and they end up in a department store. However, things soon get wild when they discover the Perfs are there too. Song featured: "Deck the Halls"

== Music featured in each episode ==
- "Only You Can Be You" – Gravity 5 ("How to Rock Braces and Glasses"; "How to Rock Camping")
- "Rules for Being Popular" – The Perfs ("How to Rock Braces and Glasses"; "How to Rock a Music Video"; "How to Rock a Lunch Table"; "How to Rock Cee Lo"; "How to Rock a Yearbook")
- "I'll Be There" – Kacey Simon ("How to Rock Braces and Glasses")
- "Go With Gravity" – Gravity 5 ("How to Rock a Messy Bet"; "How to Rock a Lunch Table")
- "Hey Now" – Gravity 5 ("How to Rock a Guest List") [writer: Livvi Franc]
- "Good Life" – Gravity 5 ("How to Rock a Music Video")
- "Music Sounds Better with U" – Big Time Rush ("How to Rock an Election")
- "Today's School News/You Want News, Babe" – Gravity 5 ("How to Rock a Newscast")
- "Move With the Crowd" – Gravity 5 ("How to Rock a Secret Agent"; "How to Rock an Election"; "How to Rock a Love Song")
- "Last 1 Standing" – Gravity 5 ("How to Rock a Birthday Party"; "How to Rock a Part-Time Job")
- "War on the Dance Floor" – Kacey Simon ("How to Rock Halloween")
- "How You Do It" – Gravity 5 ("How to Rock a Basketball Team")
- "Lady" – Zander Robbins ("How to Rock a Love Song")
- "All About Tonight" – Kacey Simon ("How to Rock Cee Lo")
- "Crazy" – Kacey and Cee Lo ("How to Rock Cee Lo")
- "Rock with Me" – Gravity 5 ("How to Rock a Singing Telegram")
- "Just Do Me" – Gravity 5 ("How to Rock a Yearbook"; "How to Rock a Good Deed")
- "Me, Myself and I" – Gravity 5, The Perfs and Trey Grant ("How to Rock a High School Sensation")
- "Deck the Halls" – Gravity 5 ("How to Rock Christmas")

== Broadcast ==
The series began broadcasting on the Nickelodeon channels on February 4, 2012, in U.S.; June 4, 2012, in Canada; May 20, 2013, in UK and Ireland; and August 13, 2013, in Australia; and December 3, 2023, in Middle East & North Africa.
