= List of programs previously broadcast by NBC =

This is a list of television programs once broadcast by the American television network NBC that have ended their runs on the network.

== Drama ==
Title	Premiere date	Finale	Notes	Seasons
Kraft Television Theatre	May 7, 1947	October 1, 1958		11
Barney Blake, Police Reporter	April 22, 1948	July 8, 1948		1
The Philco Television Playhouse	October 3, 1948	October 2, 1955		7
Colgate Theatre (1949)	January 3, 1949	June 25, 1950		2
Lights Out	July 12, 1949	September 29, 1952		3
Robert Montgomery Presents	January 30, 1950	June 24, 1957		8
Armstrong Circle Theatre	June 6, 1950	June 25, 1957	Seasons 1–7 only Moved to CBS for seasons 8–14	7
Saturday Roundup	June 10, 1951	September 1, 1951		1
Dangerous Assignment	September 1, 1951	June 1, 1952		1
Goodyear Television Playhouse	October 14, 1951	September 29, 1957		6
Dragnet (1951)	December 14, 1951	August 23, 1959		8
Your Prize Story	April 2, 1952	May 28, 1952		1
The Doctor	August 24, 1952	June 28, 1953		1
Medic	September 13, 1954	August 27, 1956		2
Fury	October 15, 1955	March 19, 1960		5
Sneak Preview	July 3, 1956	August 14, 1956		1
The Adventures of Sir Lancelot	September 24, 1956	September 16, 1957		1
Tales of Wells Fargo	March 18, 1957	June 2, 1962		6
Wagon Train	September 18, 1957	June 13, 1962	Seasons 1–5 only Moved to ABC for seasons 6–8	5
M Squad	September 20, 1957	June 21, 1960		3
Northwest Passage	September 20, 1957	August 28, 1959		1
The Restless Gun	September 23, 1957	June 22, 1959		2
The Californians	September 24, 1957	May 26, 1959		2
Goodyear Theatre	September 30, 1957	May 23, 1960		3
Decision	July 6, 1958	September 28, 1958		1
Colgate Theatre (1958)	August 19, 1958	October 7, 1958		1
The Thin Man	September 14, 1958	March 13, 1959		1
Peter Gunn	September 22, 1958	June 27, 1960	Seasons 1–2 only Moved to ABC for season 3	2
Behind Closed Doors	October 2, 1958	April 9, 1959		1
Bat Masterson	October 8, 1958	June 1, 1961		3
The Troubleshooters	September 11, 1959	April 1, 1960		1
Bonanza	September 12, 1959	January 16, 1973		14
The Deputy	September 12, 1959	July 1, 1961		2
The Man and the Challenge	September 12, 1959	June 11, 1960		1
Laramie	September 15, 1959	May 21, 1963		4
Law of the Plainsman	October 1, 1959	September 22, 1960		1
Man from Interpol	January 30, 1960	October 22, 1960		1
Tate	June 8, 1960	September 14, 1960		1
Thriller	September 13, 1960	April 30, 1962		2
National Velvet	September 18, 1960	September 17, 1962		2
Dan Raven	September 23, 1960	January 6, 1961		1
Alfred Hitchcock Presents (1960)	September 27, 1960	May 10, 1965	Seasons 6–7, 10 only Seasons 1–5, 8–9 aired on CBS	3
Outlaws	September 29, 1960	May 10, 1962		2
Klondike	October 10, 1960	February 13, 1961		1
Acapulco	February 27, 1961	April 24, 1961		1
Great Ghost Tales	July 6, 1961	September 21, 1961		1
Cain's Hundred	September 19, 1961	May 15, 1962		1
Dr. Kildare	September 28, 1961	August 30, 1966		5
Sam Benedict	September 15, 1962	March 31, 1963		1
The Virginian	September 19, 1962	March 24, 1971		9
Wide Country	September 20, 1962	April 25, 1963		1
The Eleventh Hour	October 3, 1962	April 22, 1964		2
Temple Houston	September 19, 1963	April 2, 1964		1
Mr. Novak	September 24, 1963	April 27, 1965		2
Flipper	September 19, 1964	April 15, 1967		3
The Man from U.N.C.L.E.	September 22, 1964	January 15, 1968		4
Daniel Boone	September 24, 1964	May 7, 1970		6
Branded	January 24, 1965	April 24, 1966		2
Run for Your Life	September 13, 1965	March 27, 1968		3
I Spy	September 15, 1965	April 15, 1968		3
Laredo	September 16, 1965	April 7, 1967		2
Star Trek	September 8, 1966	June 3, 1969		3
Tarzan	September 8, 1966	April 5, 1968		2
The Girl from U.N.C.L.E.	September 13, 1966	April 11, 1967		1
T.H.E. Cat	September 16, 1966	March 31, 1967		1
Dragnet (1967)	January 12, 1967	April 16, 1970		4
The High Chaparral	September 10, 1967	March 17, 1971		4
Ironside (1967)	September 14, 1967	January 16, 1975		8
Columbo	February 20, 1968	May 13, 1978	Seasons 1–7 only Moved to ABC for seasons 8–10	7
The Name of the Game	September 20, 1968	March 19, 1971		3
Adam-12	September 21, 1968	May 20, 1975		7
The Bold Ones: The New Doctors	September 14, 1969	May 4, 1973		4
Then Came Bronson	September 17, 1969	April 1, 1970		1
Bracken's World	September 19, 1969	December 25, 1970		2
The Bold Ones: The Lawyers	September 21, 1969	February 13, 1972		3
The Bold Ones: The Protectors	September 28, 1969	March 8, 1970		1
The Bold Ones: The Senator	March 21, 1970	February 28, 1971		1
Four in One	September 16, 1970	March 10, 1971		1
McCloud	September 16, 1970	April 17, 1977		7
Night Gallery	December 16, 1970	May 27, 1973		3
Nichols	September 16, 1971	March 14, 1972		1
McMillan & Wife	September 17, 1971	April 24, 1977		6
Sarge	September 21, 1971	January 11, 1972		1
Emergency!	January 15, 1972	May 28, 1977		6
Banacek	March 20, 1972	March 12, 1974		2
Ghost Story	September 15, 1972	March 30, 1973	Renamed Circle of Fear on January 5, 1973	1
Madigan	September 20, 1972	February 28, 1973		1
The Magician	March 17, 1973	April 15, 1974		1
Chase (1973)	September 11, 1973	April 10, 1974		1
Police Story	September 25, 1973	April 5, 1977		5
Love Story	October 3, 1973	January 2, 1974		1
Movin' On	May 8, 1974	March 2, 1976		2
Little House on the Prairie	September 11, 1974	March 21, 1983		9
Lucas Tanner	September 11, 1974	April 9, 1975		1
Petrocelli	September 11, 1974	March 26, 1976		2
Police Woman	September 13, 1974	March 29, 1978		4
The Rockford Files	September 13, 1974	January 10, 1980		6
The Invisible Man	September 8, 1975	January 26, 1976		1
Joe Forrester	September 9, 1975	May 3, 1976		1
Ellery Queen	September 11, 1975	April 4, 1976		1
City of Angels	February 3, 1976	May 18, 1976		1
Baa Baa Black Sheep	September 23, 1976	April 6, 1978		2
Quincy, M.E.	October 3, 1976	May 11, 1983		8
Gibbsville	November 11, 1976	December 30, 1976		1
Once an Eagle	December 2, 1976		Miniseries	1
Quinn Martin's Tales of the Unexpected	February 2, 1977	August 24, 1977		1
The Life and Times of Grizzly Adams	February 9, 1977	May 12, 1978		2
Seventh Avenue	February 10, 1977	February 24, 1977	Miniseries	1
Rosetti and Ryan	May 9, 1977	November 10, 1977		1
Mulligan's Stew	June 20, 1977	December 13, 1977		1
James at 15	September 5, 1977	June 29, 1978		1
The Bionic Woman	September 10, 1977	May 3, 1978	Season 3 only Seasons 1–2 aired on ABC	1
CHiPs	September 15, 1977	May 1, 1983		6
Big Hawaii	September 21, 1977	November 23, 1977		1
The Oregon Trail	September 21, 1977	October 26, 1977		1
Man from Atlantis	September 22, 1977	June 6, 1978		1
What Really Happened to the Class of '65?	December 8, 1977	March 25, 1978		1
The Dark Secret of Harvest Home	January 23, 1978	January 24, 1978	Miniseries	1
Project U.F.O.	February 19, 1978	July 19, 1979		2
Holocaust	April 16, 1978	April 19, 1978	Miniseries	1
The Eddie Capra Mysteries	September 8, 1978	January 12, 1979		1
Sword of Justice	September 10, 1978	July 11, 1979		1
Centennial	October 1, 1978	February 4, 1979	Miniseries	1
David Cassidy: Man Undercover	November 2, 1978	July 12, 1979		1
$weepstake$	January 26, 1979	March 30, 1979		1
Supertrain	February 7, 1979	May 5, 1979		1
B. J. and the Bear	February 10, 1979	May 9, 1981		3
Cliffhangers	February 27, 1979	May 1, 1979		1
Mrs. Columbo	February 26, 1979	March 19, 1980	Renamed Kate the Detective on October 18, 1979	2
The Duke	April 5, 1979	May 18, 1979	Miniseries	1
Buck Rogers in the 25th Century	September 20, 1979	April 16, 1981		2
Shirley	October 26, 1979	January 25, 1980		1
Here's Boomer	March 14, 1980	August 14, 1982		2
Flamingo Road	May 12, 1980	May 4, 1982		2
Shōgun	September 15, 1980	September 19, 1980	Miniseries	1
Hill Street Blues	January 15, 1981	May 12, 1987		7
Nero Wolfe	January 16, 1981	August 25, 1981		1
Father Murphy	November 3, 1981	September 18, 1983		2
Bret Maverick	December 1, 1981	May 4, 1982		1
Fame	January 7, 1982	April 17, 1983	Seasons 1–2 only Moved to first-run syndication for seasons 3–6	2
Chicago Story	March 6, 1982	June 11, 1982		1
McClain's Law	March 20, 1982	August 24, 1982		1
Born to the Wind	August 19, 1982	September 5, 1982		1
The Powers of Matthew Star	September 17, 1982	April 8, 1983		1
Knight Rider (1982)	September 26, 1982	April 4, 1986		4
Remington Steele	October 1, 1982	February 17, 1987		5
Voyagers!	October 3, 1982	July 10, 1983		1
Gavilan	October 26, 1982	March 18, 1983		1
St. Elsewhere	October 26, 1982	May 25, 1988		6
The A-Team	January 23, 1983	March 8, 1987		5
Bare Essence	February 15, 1983	June 13, 1983		1
V	May 1, 1983	May 2, 1983	Miniseries	1
Manimal	September 30, 1983	December 17, 1983		1
The Rousters	October 1, 1983	July 21, 1984		1
The Yellow Rose	October 2, 1983	May 12, 1984		1
Bay City Blues	October 25, 1983	November 15, 1983		1
Riptide	January 3, 1984	April 22, 1986		3
Legmen	January 20, 1984	March 16, 1984		1
The Master	January 20, 1984	August 31, 1984		1
Celebrity	February 12, 1984	February 14, 1984	Miniseries	1
V: The Final Battle	May 6, 1984	May 8, 1984	Miniseries	1
Miami Vice	September 16, 1984	June 28, 1989		5
Hunter	September 18, 1984	April 26, 1991		7
Highway to Heaven	September 19, 1984	August 4, 1989		5
Hot Pursuit	September 22, 1984	December 28, 1984		1
Partners in Crime	September 27, 1984	December 29, 1984		1
V: The Series	October 26, 1984	March 22, 1985		1
Berrenger's	January 5, 1985	March 9, 1985		1
Evergreen	February 24, 1985	February 26, 1985	Miniseries	1
Stingray	July 14, 1985	May 8, 1987		2
Hell Town	September 11, 1985	December 25, 1985		1
Alfred Hitchcock Presents (1985)	September 29, 1985	May 4, 1986	Season 1 only Moved to USA Network for seasons 2–4	1
Amazing Stories	September 29, 1985	April 10, 1987		2
Misfits of Science	October 4, 1985	February 21, 1986		1
Blacke's Magic	January 5, 1986	May 7, 1986		1
The Last Precinct	January 26, 1986	May 30, 1986		1
Peter the Great	February 2, 1986	February 5, 1986	Miniseries	1
Matlock	March 3, 1986	May 8, 1992	Seasons 1–6 only Moved to ABC for seasons 7–9	6
Our House	September 11, 1986	May 8, 1988		2
L.A. Law	September 15, 1986	May 19, 1994		8
Crime Story	September 18, 1986	May 10, 1988		2
A Year in the Life	December 15, 1986	April 13, 1988		1
The Bronx Zoo	March 19, 1987	June 29, 1988		2
Private Eye	September 13, 1987	January 8, 1988		1
J.J. Starbuck	September 26, 1987	June 28, 1988		1
Beverly Hills Buntz	November 5, 1987	May 20, 1988		1
Sonny Spoon	February 12, 1988	December 16, 1988		2
Noble House	February 21, 1988	February 24, 1988	Miniseries	1
In the Heat of the Night	March 6, 1988	May 19, 1992	Seasons 1–5 only Moved to CBS for seasons 6–7	5
Aaron's Way	March 9, 1988	May 25, 1988		1
Something Is Out There	May 8, 1991	December 9, 1991		1
Midnight Caller	October 25, 1988	May 10, 1991		3
Tattingers	October 26, 1988	April 26, 1989		1
Favorite Son	October 30, 1988	November 1, 1988	Miniseries	1
Father Dowling Mysteries	January 20, 1989	March 10, 1989	Season 1 only Moved to ABC for seasons 2–3	1
Nightingales	January 21, 1989	April 26, 1989		1
Quantum Leap (1989)	March 26, 1989	May 5, 1993		5
Dream Street	April 13, 1989	June 7, 1989		1
Baywatch	April 23, 1989	April 6, 1990	Season 1 only Moved to first-run syndication for seasons 2–11	1
Hardball	September 21, 1989	June 29, 1990		1
Mancuso, F.B.I.	October 13, 1989	April 24, 1990		1
Shannon's Deal	April 16, 1990	May 21, 1991		2
Hull High	August 20, 1990	December 30, 1990		1
Dark Shadows	January 13, 1991	March 22, 1991		1
The 100 Lives of Black Jack Savage	March 31, 1991	May 26, 1991		1
Sisters	May 11, 1991	May 4, 1996		6
Eerie, Indiana	September 15, 1991	April 12, 1992		1
Reasonable Doubts	September 26, 1991	April 27, 1993		2
I'll Fly Away	October 7, 1991	February 5, 1993		2
Nightmare Cafe	January 29, 1992	April 3, 1992		1
Mann & Machine	April 5, 1992	July 14, 1992		1
Secret Service	August 16, 1992	June 23, 1993		1
The Round Table	September 18, 1992	October 16, 1992		1
Homicide: Life on the Street	January 31, 1993	May 21, 1999		7
Crime & Punishment	March 3, 1993	April 7, 1993		1
South Beach	June 6, 1993	August 12, 1993		1
Route 66	June 8, 1993	July 6, 1993		1
SeaQuest DSV	September 12, 1993	June 9, 1996		3
Against the Grain	October 1, 1993	December 4, 1993		1
Viper	January 2, 1994	April 1, 1994	Season 1 only Moved to first-run syndication for seasons 2–4	1
Winnetka Road	March 12, 1994	April 16, 1994		1
The Cosby Mysteries	September 21, 1994	April 12, 1995		1
Sweet Justice	September 15, 1994	August 12, 1995		1
ER	September 19, 1994	April 2, 2009		15
Earth 2	November 6, 1994	June 4, 1995		1
Amazing Grace	April 1, 1995	September 16, 1995		1
The Beast	April 28, 1996	April 29, 1996	Miniseries	1
JAG	September 23, 1995	May 22, 1996	Season 1 only Moved to CBS for seasons 2–10	1
Malibu Shores	March 9, 1996	June 1, 1996		1
The Pretender	September 19, 1996	May 13, 2000		4
Dark Skies	September 21, 1996	May 31, 1997		1
Profiler	September 21, 1996	July 1, 2000		4
Crisis Center	February 28, 1997	April 4, 1997		1
Prince Street	March 6, 1997	March 12, 1997		1
Players	October 17, 1997	April 17, 1998		1
Sleepwalkers	November 1, 1997	May 31, 1998		1
House of Frankenstein	November 2, 1997	November 3, 1997	Miniseries	1
Trinity	October 16, 1998	November 6, 1998		1
Providence	January 8, 1999	December 20, 2002		5
The West Wing	September 22, 1999	May 14, 2006		7
Third Watch	September 23, 1999	May 6, 2005		6
Cold Feet	September 24, 1999	October 29, 1999		1
Freaks and Geeks	September 25, 1999	October 17, 2000		1
The Others	February 5, 2000	June 10, 2000		1
The 10th Kingdom	February 27, 2000	March 6, 2000	Miniseries	1
Mysterious Ways	July 24, 2000	August 3, 2001		2
Deadline	October 2, 2000	April 7, 2001		1
Titans	October 4, 2000	December 8, 2000		1
Ed	October 8, 2000	February 6, 2004		4
Crossing Jordan	September 24, 2001	May 16, 2007		6
Law & Order: Criminal Intent	September 30, 2001	May 21, 2007	Seasons 1–6 only Moved to USA Network for seasons 7–10	6
UC: Undercover	September 30, 2001	March 23, 2002		1
American Dreams	September 29, 2002	March 30, 2005		3
Boomtown	September 29, 2002	December 28, 2003		2
Mister Sterling	January 10, 2003	March 14, 2003		1
Kingpin	February 2, 2003	February 18, 2003		1
Las Vegas	September 22, 2003	February 15, 2008		5
The Lyon's Den	September 28, 2003	November 30, 2003		1
Hawaii	September 1, 2004	October 13, 2004		1
Medical Investigation	September 9, 2004	May 25, 2005		1
LAX	September 14, 2004	April 16, 2005		1
Medium	January 3, 2005	June 1, 2009	Seasons 1–5 only Moved to CBS for seasons 6–7	5
Law & Order: Trial by Jury	March 3, 2005	May 6, 2005		1
Revelations	April 13, 2005	May 18, 2005	Miniseries	1
Surface	September 19, 2005	February 6, 2006		1
E-Ring	September 21, 2005	February 1, 2006		1
Inconceivable	September 23, 2005	November 4, 2005		1
The Book of Daniel	January 6, 2006	January 20, 2006		1
Conviction	March 3, 2006	May 19, 2006		1
Heist	March 22, 2006	April 19, 2006		1
Windfall	June 8, 2006	August 31, 2006		1
Studio 60 on the Sunset Strip	September 18, 2006	June 28, 2007		1
Kidnapped	September 20, 2006	August 11, 2007		1
Heroes	September 25, 2006	February 8, 2010		4
Friday Night Lights	October 3, 2006	February 11, 2011		5
The Black Donnellys	February 26, 2007	May 14, 2007		1
Raines	March 15, 2007	April 27, 2007		1
Chuck	September 24, 2007	January 27, 2012		5
Journeyman	September 24, 2007	December 19, 2007		1
Bionic Woman	September 26, 2007	November 28, 2007		1
Life	September 26, 2007	April 8, 2009		2
Lipstick Jungle	February 7, 2008	January 9, 2009		2
Quarterlife	February 26, 2008	March 9, 2008		1
Fear Itself	June 5, 2008	July 31, 2008		1
Knight Rider (2008)	September 24, 2008	March 4, 2009		1
My Own Worst Enemy	October 13, 2008	December 15, 2008		1
Crusoe	October 17, 2008	January 31, 2009		1
Kings	March 15, 2009	July 25, 2009		1
Southland	April 9, 2009	May 21, 2009	Season 1 only Moved to TNT for seasons 2–5	1
Merlin	June 21, 2009	August 23, 2009	Season 1 only Moved to Syfy for seasons 2–5	1
The Philanthropist	June 24, 2009	August 12, 2009		1
Mercy	September 23, 2009	May 12, 2010		1
Trauma	September 28, 2009	April 26, 2010		1
Parenthood	March 2, 2010	January 29, 2015		6
Persons Unknown	June 7, 2010	August 28, 2010		1
Outlaw	September 15, 2010	November 13, 2010		1
Chase (2010)	September 20, 2010	May 21, 2011		1
The Event	September 20, 2010	May 23, 2011		1
Undercovers	September 22, 2010	December 29, 2010		1
Law & Order: LA	September 29, 2010	July 11, 2011		1
The Cape	January 9, 2011	March 11, 2011		1
Harry's Law	January 17, 2011	May 27, 2012		2
Love Bites	June 2, 2011	July 21, 2011		1
The Playboy Club	September 19, 2011	October 3, 2011		1
Prime Suspect	September 22, 2011	January 22, 2012		1
Grimm	October 28, 2011	March 31, 2017		6
The Firm	January 8, 2012	July 14, 2012		1
Smash	February 6, 2012	May 26, 2013		2
Awake	March 1, 2012	May 24, 2012		1
Saving Hope	June 7, 2012	August 30, 2012	Season 1 only Moved to Ion Television for seasons 2–5	1
Revolution	September 17, 2012	May 24, 2014		2
Deception	January 7, 2013	July 18, 2013		1
Do No Harm	January 31, 2013	September 7, 2013		1
Hannibal	April 4, 2013	August 29, 2015		3
Crossing Lines	June 23, 2013	August 18, 2013	Season 1 only Moved to Ovation for seasons 2–3	1
Siberia	July 1, 2013	September 16, 2013		1
Camp	July 10, 2013	September 11, 2013		1
The Blacklist	September 23, 2013	July 13, 2023		10
Ironside (2013)	October 2, 2013	October 23, 2013		1
Dracula	October 3, 2013	January 24, 2014		1
Believe	March 10, 2014	June 15, 2014		1
Crisis	March 16, 2014	June 21, 2014		1
Rosemary's Baby	May 11, 2014	May 15, 2014	Miniseries	1
Taxi Brooklyn	June 25, 2014	September 10, 2014		1
The Night Shift	May 27, 2014	August 31, 2017		4
Crossbones	May 30, 2014	August 2, 2014		1
The Mysteries of Laura	September 17, 2014	March 12, 2016		2
Constantine	October 24, 2014	February 13, 2015		1
State of Affairs	November 17, 2014	February 16, 2015		1
Allegiance	February 5, 2015	March 5, 2015		1
The Slap	February 12, 2015	April 12, 2015	Miniseries	1
American Odyssey	April 5, 2015	June 28, 2015		1
A.D. The Bible Continues	April 5, 2015	June 21, 2015		1
Aquarius	May 28, 2015	September 10, 2016		2
Blindspot	September 21, 2015	July 23, 2020		5
Heroes Reborn	September 24, 2015	January 21, 2016	Miniseries	1
The Player	September 24, 2015	November 19, 2015		1
Shades of Blue	January 7, 2016	August 19, 2018		3
You, Me and the Apocalypse	January 28, 2016	March 16, 2016		1
Heartbeat	March 22, 2016	May 25, 2016		1
Game of Silence	April 12, 2016	June 5, 2016		1
This Is Us	September 20, 2016	May 24, 2022		6
Timeless	October 3, 2016	December 20, 2018		2
Emerald City	January 6, 2017	March 3, 2017		1
The Blacklist: Redemption	February 23, 2017	April 13, 2017		1
Taken	February 27, 2017	June 30, 2018		2
Chicago Justice	March 1, 2017	May 14, 2017		1
Midnight, Texas	July 24, 2017	December 28, 2018		2
The Brave	September 25, 2017	January 29, 2018		1
Law & Order True Crime	September 26, 2017	November 14, 2017		1
Good Girls	February 26, 2018	July 22, 2021		4
Rise	March 13, 2018	May 15, 2018		1
Reverie	May 12, 2018	August 8, 2018		1
Manifest	September 24, 2018	June 10, 2021	Seasons 1–3 only Moved to Netflix for season 4	3
New Amsterdam	September 25, 2018	January 17, 2023		5
The Enemy Within	February 25, 2019	May 20, 2019		1
The Village	March 19, 2019	May 21, 2019		1
The InBetween	May 29, 2019	August 14, 2019		1
Bluff City Law	September 23, 2019	November 25, 2019		1
Zoey's Extraordinary Playlist	January 7, 2020	May 16, 2021		2
Lincoln Rhyme: Hunt for the Bone Collector	January 10, 2020	March 13, 2020		1
Council of Dads	March 24, 2020	July 2, 2020		1
Debris	March 1, 2021	May 28, 2021		1
Law & Order: Organized Crime	April 1, 2021	November 20, 2025	Episodes of season 5 were broadcast second-run on NBC after premiering on Peacock	5
Ordinary Joe	September 20, 2021	January 24, 2022		1
La Brea	September 28, 2021	February 13, 2024		3
The Endgame	February 21, 2022	May 2, 2022		1
The Thing About Pam	March 8, 2022	April 12, 2022	Miniseries	1
Quantum Leap (2022)	September 19, 2022	February 20, 2024		2
Magnum P.I.	February 19, 2023	January 3, 2024	Season 5 only Seasons 1–4 aired on CBS	1
The Irrational	September 25, 2023	March 25, 2025		2
Found	October 3, 2023	May 15, 2025		2
Brilliant Minds	September 23, 2024	July 1, 2026		2
The Hunting Party	January 19, 2025	May 7, 2026		2
Grosse Pointe Garden Society	February 23, 2025	May 16, 2025		1
Suits LA	February 23, 2025	May 18, 2025		1

== Comedy ==
Title	Premiere date	Finale	Notes	Seasons
Mary Kay and Johnny	October 10, 1948	March 11, 1950	Season 2 only Season 1 aired on the DuMont Television Network	1
The Aldrich Family	October 2, 1949	September 12, 1953		4
The Life of Riley	October 4, 1949	May 3, 1958		7
Boss Lady	July 1, 1952	September 23, 1952		1
Mister Peepers	July 3, 1952	June 12, 1955		3
I Married Joan	October 15, 1952	March 23, 1955		3
Ethel and Albert	April 25, 1953	December 25, 1954	Seasons 1–2 only Moved to CBS for season 3 and ABC for season 4	2
My Little Margie	September 2, 1953	August 24, 1955	Seasons 3–4 only Seasons 1–2 aired on CBS	2
Dear Phoebe	September 10, 1954	April 8, 1955		1
The Bob Cummings Show	January 2, 1955	September 15, 1959	Seasons 1, 4–5 only Moved to CBS for seasons 2–3	3
Norby	January 5, 1955	April 6, 1955		1
Father Knows Best	August 31, 1955	June 11, 1958	Seasons 2–4 only Seasons 1, 5–6 aired on CBS	3
The People's Choice	October 6, 1955	September 25, 1958		3
Stanley	September 24, 1956	March 11, 1957		1
Blondie	January 4, 1957	June 28, 1957		1
Sally	September 15, 1957	March 30, 1958		1
Bachelor Father	September 17, 1959	July 6, 1961	Seasons 3–4 only Season 1–2 aired on CBS; Moved to ABC for season 5	2
Love and Marriage	September 21, 1959	January 25, 1960		1
Happy	June 8, 1960	April 7, 1961		2
The Tab Hunter Show	September 18, 1960	April 30, 1961		1
Peter Loves Mary	October 12, 1960	March 31, 1961		1
Westinghouse Preview Theatre	July 14, 1961	September 22, 1961		1
Car 54, Where Are You?	September 17, 1961	April 13, 1963		2
The Joey Bishop Show	September 20, 1961	April 25, 1964	Seasons 1–3 only Moved to CBS for season 4	3
Hazel	September 28, 1961	March 25, 1965	Seasons 1–4 only Moved to CBS for season 5	4
Ensign O'Toole	September 23, 1962	May 5, 1963		1
Harry's Girls	September 13, 1963	January 3, 1964		1
The Bill Dana Show	September 22, 1963	January 17, 1965		2
The Jack Benny Program	September 9, 1964	April 4, 1965	Season 15 only Seasons 1–14 aired on CBS	1
The Rogues	September 13, 1964	April 18, 1965		1
Kentucky Jones	September 19, 1964	April 10, 1965		1
90 Bristol Court	October 5, 1964	January 4, 1965		1
Harris Against the World	October 5, 1964	January 4, 1965		1
Karen	October 5, 1964	April 19, 1965		1
Tom, Dick, and Mary	October 5, 1964	January 4, 1965		1
My Mother the Car	September 14, 1965	April 5, 1966		1
Please Don't Eat the Daisies	September 14, 1965	April 22, 1967		2
Mona McCluskey	September 16, 1965	April 14, 1966		1
Camp Runamuck	September 17, 1965	April 15, 1966		1
Get Smart	September 17, 1965	March 29, 1969	Seasons 1–4 only Moved to CBS for season 5	4
Hank	September 17, 1965	April 15, 1966		1
Mister Roberts	September 17, 1965	September 2, 1966		1
I Dream of Jeannie	September 18, 1965	May 26, 1970		5
The Wackiest Ship in the Army	September 19, 1965	April 17, 1966		1
Hey, Landlord	September 11, 1966	April 23, 1967		1
The Monkees	September 12, 1966	March 25, 1968		2
Occasional Wife	September 13, 1966	April 29, 1967		1
The Mothers-in-Law	September 10, 1967	April 13, 1969		2
Accidental Family	September 15, 1967	January 5, 1968		1
Julia	September 17, 1968	March 23, 1971		3
The Ghost & Mrs. Muir	September 21, 1968	March 29, 1969	Season 1 only Moved to ABC for season 2	1
The Bill Cosby Show	September 14, 1969	March 21, 1971		2
My World and Welcome to It	September 15, 1969	March 9, 1970		1
The Debbie Reynolds Show	September 16, 1969	April 14, 1970		1
Nancy	September 17, 1970	January 7, 1971		1
From a Bird's Eye View	September 18, 1970	April 21, 1971		1
The Good Life (1971)	September 18, 1971	January 8, 1972		1
The Partners	September 18, 1971	September 8, 1972		1
The Jimmy Stewart Show	September 19, 1971	March 2, 1972		1
Sanford and Son	January 14, 1972	March 25, 1977		6
The Brian Keith Show	September 15, 1972	March 29, 1974		2
Diana	September 10, 1973	January 7, 1974		1
Lotsa Luck	September 10, 1973	March 15, 1974		1
The Girl with Something Extra	September 14, 1973	March 15, 1974		1
Needles and Pins	September 21, 1973	December 28, 1973		1
Chico and the Man	September 13, 1974	July 21, 1978		4
The Bob Crane Show	March 6, 1975	June 12, 1975		1
Fay	September 4, 1975	June 2, 1976		1
The Montefuscos	September 4, 1975	October 23, 1975		1
The Dumplings	October 4, 1975	March 31, 1976		1
Grady	December 4, 1975	March 11, 1976		1
The Practice	January 30, 1976	January 26, 1977		2
Comedy Theatre (1976)	July 26, 1976	June 28, 1979		2
C.P.O. Sharkey	December 1, 1976	April 28, 1978		2
The McLean Stevenson Show	December 1, 1976	March 23, 1977		1
Sirota's Court	December 1, 1976	April 13, 1977		1
Rollergirls	April 24, 1977	May 28, 1977		1
Quark	May 7, 1977	April 7, 1978		1
Comedy Time	July 6, 1977	September 1, 1977		1
The Kallikaks	August 3, 1977	August 31, 1977		1
Sanford Arms	September 16, 1977	October 14, 1977		1
Joe & Valerie	April 24, 1978	January 19, 1979		2
Grandpa Goes to Washington	September 7, 1978	January 16, 1979		1
The Waverly Wonders	September 7, 1978	October 6, 1978		1
Who's Watching the Kids?	September 22, 1978	December 15, 1978		1
Diff'rent Strokes	November 3, 1978	May 4, 1985	Seasons 1–7 only Moved to ABC for season 8	7
Brothers and Sisters	January 21, 1979	April 6, 1979		1
Hello, Larry	January 26, 1979	April 30, 1980		2
Turnabout	January 26, 1979	March 30, 1979		1
Hizzonner	May 10, 1979	June 14, 1979		1
The Facts of Life	August 24, 1979	May 7, 1988		9
The Misadventures of Sheriff Lobo	September 18, 1979	May 5, 1981		2
United States	March 11, 1980	April 29, 1980		1
Sanford	March 15, 1980	July 10, 1981		2
Harper Valley PTA	January 16, 1981	August 14, 1982		2
Comedy Theater (1981)	July 17, 1981	August 28, 1981		1
Love, Sidney	October 28, 1981	June 6, 1983		2
Gimme a Break!	October 29, 1981	May 12, 1987		6
Lewis & Clark	October 29, 1981	July 30, 1982		1
One of the Boys (1982)	January 23, 1982	April 24, 1982		1
Family Ties	September 22, 1982	May 14, 1989		7
Silver Spoons	September 25, 1982	May 11, 1986	Seasons 1–4 only Moved to first-run syndication for season 5	4
Cheers	September 30, 1982	May 20, 1993		11
Taxi	September 30, 1982	June 15, 1983	Season 5 only Seasons 1–4 aired on ABC	1
Mama's Family	January 22, 1983	April 7, 1984	Seasons 1–2 only Moved to first-run syndication for seasons 3–6	2
Buffalo Bill	June 1, 1983	March 29, 1984		2
We Got It Made	September 8, 1983	March 10, 1984	Season 1 only Moved to first-run syndication for season 2	1
Mr. Smith	September 23, 1983	December 16, 1983		1
Jennifer Slept Here	October 21, 1983	September 5, 1984		1
Night Court (1984)	January 4, 1984	May 31, 1992		9
Double Trouble	April 4, 1984	March 30, 1985		2
The Duck Factory	April 12, 1984	July 11, 1984		1
Punky Brewster	September 16, 1984	March 9, 1986	Seasons 1–2 only Moved to first-run syndication for seasons 3–4	2
The Cosby Show	September 20, 1984	April 30, 1992		8
It's Your Move	September 26, 1984	February 23, 1985		1
Spencer	December 1, 1984	May 11, 1985	Renamed Under One Roof on March 23, 1985	1
Sara	January 23, 1985	May 8, 1985		1
The Golden Girls	September 14, 1985	May 9, 1992		7
227	September 14, 1985	May 6, 1990		5
The Last Precinct	January 26, 1986	May 30, 1986		1
You Again?	February 27, 1986	January 7, 1987		2
The Hogan Family	March 1, 1986	May 7, 1990	Seasons 1–5 only Moved to CBS for season 6	5
All Is Forgiven	March 20, 1986	June 12, 1986		1
Fathers and Sons	April 6, 1986	May 4, 1986		1
Easy Street	September 13, 1986	April 29, 1987		1
ALF	September 22, 1986	March 24, 1990		4
Amen	September 27, 1986	May 11, 1991		5
The Tortellis	January 22, 1987	May 12, 1987		1
Rags to Riches	March 9, 1987	January 15, 1988		2
Roomies	March 19, 1987	May 15, 1987		1
Nothing in Common	April 2, 1987	June 3, 1987		1
Sweet Surrender	April 18, 1987	July 8, 1987		1
The Days and Nights of Molly Dodd	May 21, 1987	June 29, 1988	Seasons 1–2 only Moved to Lifetime for seasons 3–5	2
Mama's Boy	September 19, 1987	August 6, 1988		1
My Two Dads	September 20, 1987	April 30, 1990		3
A Different World	September 24, 1987	July 9, 1993		6
Day by Day	February 29, 1988	June 4, 1989		2
Baby Boom	September 10, 1988	July 13, 1989		1
Dear John	October 6, 1988	July 22, 1992		4
Empty Nest	October 8, 1988	June 15, 1995		7
The Jim Henson Hour	April 14, 1989	July 30, 1989		1
One of the Boys (1989)	April 15, 1989	May 20, 1989		1
Seinfeld	July 5, 1989	May 14, 1998		9
Sister Kate	September 16, 1989	September 1, 1990		1
The Nutt House	September 20, 1989	October 25, 1989		1
Ann Jillian	November 30, 1989	August 19, 1990		1
Grand	January 18, 1990	December 27, 1990		2
Carol & Company	March 31, 1990	May 4, 1991		2
Down Home	April 12, 1990	May 18, 1991		2
Working Girl	April 16, 1990	July 30, 1990		1
Wings	April 19, 1990	May 21, 1997		8
Blossom	July 5, 1990	May 22, 1995		5
Parenthood	August 20, 1990	August 11, 1991		1
Working It Out	August 22, 1990	December 12, 1990		1
Ferris Bueller	August 23, 1990	August 11, 1991		1
The Fanelli Boys	September 8, 1990	February 16, 1991		1
The Fresh Prince of Bel-Air	September 10, 1990	May 20, 1996		6
American Dreamer	September 20, 1990	June 22, 1991		1
Nurses	September 14, 1991	May 7, 1994		3
Man of the People	September 15, 1991	July 13, 1992		1
Pacific Station	September 15, 1991	January 3, 1992		1
Flesh 'n' Blood	September 19, 1991	November 15, 1991		1
The Torkelsons	September 21, 1991	June 12, 1993	Renamed Almost Home on February 6, 1993	2
Walter & Emily	November 16, 1991	February 22, 1992		1
The Powers That Be	March 7, 1992	January 2, 1993		2
California Dreams	September 12, 1992	December 14, 1996		5
Here and Now	September 19, 1992	January 3, 1993		1
Out All Night	September 19, 1992	July 9, 1993		1
Mad About You	September 23, 1992	May 24, 1999		7
Rhythm & Blues	September 24, 1992	October 24, 1992		1
Saved by the Bell: The College Years	May 22, 1993	February 8, 1994		1
The John Larroquette Show	September 1, 1993	October 30, 1996		4
The Second Half	September 7, 1993	April 12, 1994		1
Frasier	September 16, 1993	May 13, 2004		11
Café Americain	September 18, 1993	May 28, 1994		1
The Mommies	September 18, 1993	June 10, 1995		2
Getting By	September 21, 1993	June 18, 1994	Season 2 only Season 1 aired on ABC	1
The Good Life (1994)	January 3, 1994	April 12, 1994		1
Someone Like Me	March 14, 1994	April 25, 1994		1
The Martin Short Show	September 15, 1994	September 27, 1994		1
Friends	September 22, 1994	May 6, 2004		10
Madman of the People	September 22, 1994	June 17, 1995		1
Something Wilder	October 1, 1994	June 13, 1995		1
Hope & Gloria	March 9, 1995	June 22, 1996		2
NewsRadio	March 21, 1995	May 4, 1999		5
Pride & Joy	March 21, 1995	May 2, 1995		1
In the House	April 10, 1995	May 13, 1996	Seasons 1–2 only Moved to UPN for seasons 3–4 and first-run syndication for season 5	2
Minor Adjustments	September 16, 1995	November 26, 1995	The first eight episodes only The remaining twelve episodes were released on UPN	1
Brotherly Love	September 16, 1995	April 1, 1996	Season 1 only Moved to The WB for season 2	1
The Pursuit of Happiness	September 19, 1995	November 7, 1995		1
Caroline in the City	September 21, 1995	April 26, 1999		4
The Single Guy	September 21, 1995	April 14, 1997		2
The Home Court	September 30, 1995	June 22, 1996		1
3rd Rock from the Sun	January 9, 1996	May 22, 2001		6
Boston Common	March 21, 1996	April 28, 1997		2
Something So Right	September 16, 1996	May 6, 1997	Season 1 only Moved to ABC for season 2	1
Men Behaving Badly	September 18, 1996	December 17, 1997		2
Suddenly Susan	September 19, 1996	December 26, 2000		4
The Jeff Foxworthy Show	September 23, 1996	May 5, 1997	Season 2 only Season 1 aired on ABC	1
Mr. Rhodes	September 23, 1996	March 10, 1997		1
Chicago Sons	January 8, 1997	July 2, 1997		1
The Naked Truth	January 16, 1997	May 25, 1998	Seasons 2–3 only Season 1 aired on ABC	2
Just Shoot Me!	March 4, 1997	November 26, 2003		7
Fired Up	April 10, 1997	February 9, 1998		2
Built to Last	September 24, 1997	October 17, 1997		1
The Tony Danza Show	September 24, 1997	December 10, 1997		1
Union Square	September 25, 1997	January 22, 1998		1
Veronica's Closet	September 25, 1997	December 7, 2000		3
Jenny	September 28, 1997	January 12, 1998		1
Working	October 8, 1997	January 25, 1999		2
House Rules	March 9, 1998	June 8, 1998		1
For Your Love	March 17, 1998	May 5, 1998	Season 1 only Moved to The WB for seasons 2–5	1
LateLine	March 17, 1998	March 16, 1999		2
Conrad Bloom	September 21, 1998	December 21, 1998		1
Will & Grace	September 21, 1998	April 23, 2020		11
Encore! Encore!	September 22, 1998	January 27, 1999		1
Jesse	September 24, 1998	May 25, 2000		2
Everything's Relative	April 6, 1999	April 27, 1999		1
The Mike O'Malley Show	September 21, 1999	September 28, 1999		1
Stark Raving Mad	September 23, 1999	July 13, 2000		1
Battery Park	March 23, 2000	April 13, 2000		1
Daddio	March 23, 2000	October 23, 2000		2
M.Y.O.B.	June 6, 2000	June 27, 2000		1
Tucker	October 2, 2000	October 23, 2000		1
The Michael Richards Show	October 24, 2000	December 19, 2000		1
Cursed	October 26, 2000	April 26, 2001	Renamed The Weber Show on January 4, 2001	1
DAG	November 14, 2000	May 29, 2001		1
Three Sisters	January 9, 2001	February 5, 2002		2
The Fighting Fitzgeralds	March 6, 2001	May 15, 2001		1
Kristin	June 5, 2001	July 10, 2001		1
Go Fish	September 19, 2001	July 3, 2001		1
Emeril	September 25, 2001	December 11, 2001		1
Inside Schwartz	September 27, 2001	January 3, 2002		1
Scrubs	October 2, 2001	May 8, 2008	Seasons 1–7 only Moved to ABC for seasons 8–9	7
Imagine That	January 8, 2002	January 15, 2002		1
Watching Ellie	February 26, 2002	May 20, 2003		2
Leap of Faith	February 28, 2002	April 4, 2002		1
Hidden Hills	September 24, 2002	January 21, 2003		1
In-Laws	September 24, 2002	January 14, 2003		1
Good Morning, Miami	September 26, 2002	December 18, 2003		2
A.U.S.A.	February 2, 2003	April 1, 2003		1
Happy Family	September 9, 2003	April 20, 2004		1
Whoopi	September 9, 2003	April 20, 2004		1
Coupling	September 25, 2003	October 23, 2003		1
Miss Match	September 26, 2003	December 15, 2003		1
The Tracy Morgan Show	December 2, 2003	March 20, 2004		1
Joey	September 9, 2004	March 7, 2006		2
Committed	January 4, 2005	March 15, 2005		1
The Office	March 24, 2005	May 16, 2013		9
My Name Is Earl	September 20, 2005	May 24, 2009		4
Four Kings	January 5, 2006	March 16, 2006		1
Teachers	March 28, 2006	May 2, 2006		1
30 Rock	October 11, 2006	January 31, 2013		7
Twenty Good Years	October 11, 2006	November 1, 2006		1
Andy Barker, P.I.	March 15, 2007	April 14, 2007		1
Kath & Kim	October 9, 2008	March 12, 2009		1
Parks and Recreation	April 9, 2009	February 24, 2015		7
Ctrl	July 14, 2009	August 25, 2009		1
Community	September 17, 2009	April 17, 2014	Seasons 1–5 only Moved to Yahoo! Screen for season 6	5
100 Questions	May 27, 2010	July 1, 2010		1
Outsourced	September 23, 2010	May 12, 2011		1
Perfect Couples	December 20, 2010	April 7, 2011		1
The Paul Reiser Show	April 14, 2011	April 21, 2011		1
Friends with Benefits	August 5, 2011	September 9, 2011		1
Free Agents	September 14, 2011	October 5, 2011	The first four episodes only The remaining four episodes were released on Hulu	1
Up All Night	September 14, 2011	December 13, 2012		2
Whitney	September 22, 2011	March 27, 2013		2
Are You There, Chelsea?	January 11, 2012	March 28, 2012		1
Bent	March 21, 2012	April 4, 2012		1
Best Friends Forever	April 4, 2012	June 1, 2012		1
Go On	August 8, 2012	April 11, 2013		1
Animal Practice	August 12, 2012	November 28, 2012		1
The New Normal	September 10, 2012	April 2, 2013		1
Guys with Kids	September 11, 2012	February 27, 2013		1
1600 Penn	December 17, 2012	March 28, 2013		1
Save Me	March 23, 2013	June 13, 2013		1
The Michael J. Fox Show	September 26, 2013	January 23, 2014		1
Sean Saves the World	October 3, 2013	March 24, 2014		1
Welcome to the Family	October 3, 2013	October 17, 2013		1
Growing Up Fisher	February 23, 2014	June 11, 2014		1
About a Boy	February 22, 2014	July 20, 2015		2
Working the Engels	March 12, 2014	August 7, 2014		1
Undateable	May 29, 2014	January 29, 2016		3
Welcome to Sweden	July 10, 2014	July 26, 2015	The first four episodes of the second season only The remaining six episodes were released on NBC.com	2
A to Z	October 2, 2014	January 22, 2015		1
Bad Judge	October 2, 2014	January 22, 2015		1
Marry Me	October 14, 2014	February 17, 2015		1
One Big Happy	March 17, 2015	April 28, 2015		1
Mr. Robinson	August 5, 2015	August 19, 2015		1
The Carmichael Show	August 26, 2015	August 9, 2017		3
Truth Be Told	October 16, 2015	December 25, 2015		1
Superstore	November 30, 2015	March 25, 2021		6
Telenovela	December 7, 2015	February 22, 2016		1
Crowded	March 15, 2016	May 22, 2016		1
The Good Place	September 19, 2016	January 30, 2020		4
Powerless	February 2, 2017	April 20, 2017		1
Trial & Error	March 14, 2017	August 23, 2018		2
Great News	April 25, 2017	January 25, 2018		2
Marlon	August 16, 2017	July 12, 2018		2
A.P. Bio	February 1, 2018	June 13, 2019	Seasons 1–2 only Moved to Peacock for seasons 3–4	2
Champions	March 8, 2018	May 25, 2018		1
I Feel Bad	September 19, 2018	December 27, 2018		1
Brooklyn Nine-Nine	January 10, 2019	September 16, 2021	Seasons 6–8 only Seasons 1–5 aired on Fox	3
Abby's	March 28, 2019	September 13, 2019		1
Perfect Harmony	September 26, 2019	January 23, 2020		1
Sunnyside	September 26, 2019	October 17, 2019	The first four episodes only The remaining seven episodes were released on NBC.com	1
Indebted	February 6, 2020	April 16, 2020		1
Connecting...	October 8, 2020	October 29, 2020	The first four episodes only The remaining four episodes were released on Peacock	1
Mr. Mayor	January 7, 2021	May 17, 2022		2
Kenan	February 16, 2021	January 31, 2022		2
Young Rock	February 16, 2021	February 24, 2023		3
American Auto	December 13, 2021	April 18, 2023		2
Grand Crew	December 14, 2021	April 28, 2023		2
Lopez vs Lopez	November 4, 2022	February 7, 2025		3
Night Court (2023)	January 17, 2023	May 6, 2025		3
Extended Family	December 23, 2023	March 26, 2024		1
Stumble	November 7, 2025	March 13, 2026		1

== Animation ==
=== Adult animation ===
- Jokebook (1982)
- Stressed Eric (1998) (Note: American dub, series 1 only)
- God, the Devil and Bob (2000; moved to Adult Swim)
- Sammy (2000)
- Father of the Pride (2004–05)

=== Children's animation ===
- The Bullwinkle Show (1961–64)
- The Famous Adventures of Mr. Magoo (1964–65)
- The Flintstone Primetime Specials (1980–81)

== Unscripted ==
=== Docuseries ===
- This Is Your Life (1952–61)
- Victory at Sea (1952–53)
- Japan Spectacular Show (1959)
- NBC White Paper (1960–87)
- Wild Kingdom (1963–71)
- C. Everett Koop, M.D. (1991)
- National Geographic Specials (1995–99)
- Who Do You Think You Are? (2010–12; 2022)
- The Widower (2021)
- LA Fire & Rescue (2023)
- Surviving Earth (2026)

=== Game shows ===
- Americana (1947–49)
- Who Said That? (1948–55)
- Break the Bank (1949–52; 1953; 1956–57)
- Quiz Kids (1949–53)
- Twenty Questions (1949)
- The Mystery Chef (1949)
- You Bet Your Life (1950–61)
- The Big Payoff (1951–53)
- It Pays to Be Ignorant (1951)
- Masquerade Party (1952; 1957; 1958–59; 1960)
- Pantomime Quiz (1952)
- Two For the Money (1952–53)
- Winner Take All (1952)
- Bride and Groom (1953)
- Name That Tune (1953–59; 1974–75; 1977)
- Place the Face (1953–55)
- Bank on the Stars (1954)
- Dollar A Second (1954; 1955; 1957)
- People Are Funny (1954–60)
- Truth or Consequences (1954–65)
- Two in Love (1954)
- The Big Surprise (1955–57)
- Make the Connection (1955)
- Musical Chairs (1955)
- Choose Up Sides (1956)
- Down You Go (1956)
- It Could Be You (1956–61)
- The Price Is Right (1956–63)
- Queen for a Day (1956–60)
- Tic-Tac-Dough (1956–59)
- Twenty-One (1956–58; 2000–01)
- High-Low (1957)
- Hold That Note (1957)
- Treasure Hunt (1957–59)
- The Big Game (1958)
- Brains & Brawn (1958)
- Concentration (1958–73)
- Dotto (1958 Primetime only)
- Dough Re Mi (1958–60)
- Haggis Baggis (1958–59)
- Music Bingo (1958)
- Jackpot Bowling (1959–61)
- Laugh Line (1959)
- Play Your Hunch (1959–63)
- Split Personality (1959–60)
- Say When!! (1961–65)
- The Match Game (1962–69)
- Your First Impression (1962–64)
- College Bowl (1963–70; previously aired on NBC Radio Network)
- Let's Make a Deal (1963–68; 1990–91; 2003)
- Missing Links (1963–64)
- People Will Talk (1963)
- You Don't Say! (1963–69)
- Jeopardy! (1964–75; 1978–79)
- What's This Song? (1964–65)
- Call My Bluff (1965)
- I'll Bet (1965)
- Eye Guess (1966–69)
- Hollywood Squares (1966–80)
- Showdown (1966)
- Personality (1967–69)
- Reach for the Stars (1967)
- Snap Judgment (1967–69)
- It Takes Two (1969–70)
- Letters to Laugh-In (1969)
- Lohman & Barkley's Name Droppers (1969–70)
- Sale of the Century (1969–73; 1983–89)
- Storybook Squares (1969; 1976–77)
- The Who, What, or Where Game (1969–74)
- You're Putting Me On (1969)
- Memory Game (1971)
- Three on a Match (1971–74)
- Runaround (1972–73)
- Baffle (1973–74)
- The Wizard of Odds (1973–74)
- Celebrity Sweepstakes (1974–76)
- High Rollers (1974–76; 1978–80)
- Jackpot! (1974–75)
- Winning Streak (1974–75)
- Blank Check (1975)
- The Magnificent Marble Machine (1975–76)
- Three for the Money (1975)
- Wheel of Fortune (1975–89; 1991)
- 50 Grand Slam (1976)
- The Fun Factory (1976)
- The Gong Show (1976–78)
- Stumpers (1976)
- It's Anybody's Guess (1977)
- Knockout (1977–78)
- Shoot for the Stars (1977)
- To Say the Least (1977–78)
- Card Sharks (1978–81)
- All Star Secrets (1979)
- Mindreaders (1979–80)
- Password Plus (1979–82)
- Blockbusters (1980–82; 1987)
- Chain Reaction (1980)
- Gambit (1980–81)
- Las Vegas Gambit (1980–81)
- Battlestars (1981–83)
- Fantasy (1982–83)
- Dream House (1983–84)
- Go (1983–84)
- Hit Man (1983)
- Just Men! (1983)
- Match Game-Hollywood Squares Hour (1983–84)
- Hot Potato (1984)
- Scrabble (1984–90; 1993)
- Super Password (1984–89)
- Time Machine (1985)
- Your Number's Up (1985)
- Wordplay (1986–87)
- Classic Concentration (1987–91)
- I'm Telling! (1987–88)
- Win, Lose or Draw (1987–89)
- To Tell the Truth (1990–91)
- Double Up (1992)
- Brains & Brawn (1993)
- Caesars Challenge (1993–94)
- Family Secrets (1993)
- Scattergories (1993)
- Weakest Link (2001–02; 2020–24)
- National Heads Up Poker Championship (2005–11; 2013)
- Deal or No Deal (2005–09)
- 1 vs. 100 (2006–08)
- Identity (2006–07)
- Poker After Dark (2007–11)
- The Singing Bee (2007)
- Amne$ia (2008)
- Celebrity Family Feud (2008)
- Face The Ace (2009–10)
- Minute to Win It (2010–11)
- It's Worth What? (2011)
- Who's Still Standing? (2011–12)
- Take It All (2012)
- The Winner Is (2013)
- Hollywood Game Night (2013–20)
- The Million Second Quiz (2013)
- Ellen's Game of Games (2017–21)
- Genius Junior (2018)
- Cannonball (2020)
- Small Fortune (2021)
- Family Game Fight! (2021–22)
- The Wheel (2022)

=== Reality ===
- Real People (1979–84)
- Unsolved Mysteries (1987–97)
- The Adventures of Mark & Brian (1991)
- I Witness Video (1992–94)
- What Happened? (1992)
- World's Most Amazing Videos (1999–2001)
- Fear Factor (2001–06; 2011–12)
- Spy TV (2001–02)
- Forensic Files (2002)
- Crime & Punishment (2002–04)
- Dog Eat Dog (2002–03)
- Meet My Folks (2002)
- Nashville Star (2003–08)
- America's Most Talented Kid (2003)
- Last Comic Standing (2003–04; 2006–08; 2010; 2014–15)
- For Love or Money (2003–04)
- Who Wants to Marry My Dad? (2003–04)
- Race to the Altar (2003)
- The Restaurant (2003–04)
- Average Joe (2003–05)
- The Apprentice (2004–17)
- Next Action Star (2004)
- The Biggest Loser (2004–16; moved to USA Network)
- The Contender (2005)
- Hit Me, Baby, One More Time (2005)
- The Law Firm (2005)
- Tommy Lee Goes to College (2005)
- The Apprentice: Martha Stewart (2005)
- Three Wishes (2005)
- Celebrity Cooking Showdown (2006)
- Treasure Hunters (2006)
- Grease: You're the One That I Want! (2007)
- Thank God You're Here (2007)
- The Real Wedding Crashers (2007)
- Age of Love (2007)
- Phenomenon (2007)
- Clash of the Choirs (2007)
- American Gladiators (2008)
- My Dad Is Better than Your Dad (2008)
- Celebrity Circus (2008)
- The Baby Borrowers (2008)
- America's Toughest Jobs (2008)
- Momma's Boys (2008–09)
- Superstars of Dance (2009)
- Howie Do It (2009)
- The Chopping Block (2009)
- The Great American Road Trip (2009)
- The Sing-Off (2009–11; 2013–14)
- The Marriage Ref (2010–11)
- School Pride (2010)
- Love in the Wild (2011–12)
- Betty White's Off Their Rockers (2012–13)
- Fashion Star (2012–13)
- Escape Routes (2012)
- Stars Earn Stripes (2012)
- Take It All (2012)
- Ready for Love (2013)
- Get Out Alive with Bear Grylls (2013)
- American Dream Builders (2014)
- Food Fighters (2014–15)
- Running Wild with Bear Grylls (2014–18)
- Caught on Camera with Nick Cannon (2014–16)
- The Island (2015)
- I Can Do That (2015)
- Best Time Ever with Neil Patrick Harris (2015)
- Little Big Shots (2016–20)
- Strong (2016)
- Better Late Than Never (2016–18)
- First Dates (2017)
- World of Dance (2017–20)
- Little Big Shots: Forever Young (2017)
- Making It (2018–21)
- The Titan Games (2019–20)
- America's Got Talent: The Champions (2019–20)
- Songland (2019–20)
- Bring the Funny (2019)
- Ellen's Greatest Night of Giveaways (2019)
- Home Sweet Home (2021; moved to Peacock)
- America's Got Talent: Extreme (2022)
- The Courtship (2022; moved to USA Network)
- American Song Contest (2022)
- Dancing with Myself (2022)
- America's Got Talent: All-Stars (2023)
- Hot Wheels: Ultimate Challenge (2023)
- America's Got Talent: Fantasy League (2024)
- Deal or No Deal Island (2024–25)
- Yes, Chef! (2025)
- On Brand with Jimmy Fallon (2025)

=== Variety ===
- Kraft Television Theatre (1947–53; 1955–58)
- Texaco Star Theater (1948–56)
- The Mystery Chef (1949)
- The Colgate Comedy Hour (1950–55)
- Four Star Revue (1950–53)
- The Paul Winchell Show (1950–54)
- Your Show of Shows (1950–54)
- The Dinah Shore Show (1951–57)
- Hallmark Hall of Fame (1951–79)
- Henry Morgan's Great Talent Hunt (1951)
- The Ernie Kovacs Show (1952–53)
- Letter to Loretta (1953–61)
- Caesar's Hour (1954–57)
- The George Gobel Show (1954–59)
- The Martha Raye Show (1954–56)
- Tonight Starring Steve Allen (1954–57)
- The Perry Como Show (1955–67)
- The Dinah Shore Chevy Show (1956–63)
- The Ford Show (1956–61)
- The Nat King Cole Show (1956–57)
- The NBC Comedy Hour (1956)
- The Steve Allen Show (1956–60)
- Tonight Starring Jack Paar (1957–62)
- The Bell Telephone Hour (1959–68)
- Startime (1959–60)
- Five Star Jubilee (1961)
- Sing Along With Mitch (1961–66)
- The Andy Williams Show (1962–67; 1969–71)
- The Tonight Show Starring Johnny Carson (1962–92)
- The Dean Martin Show (1965–74)
- Rowan & Martin's Laugh-In (1968–73)
- The Don Knotts Show (1970–71)
- The Flip Wilson Show (1970–74)
- Dinah! (1970–74)
- The Midnight Special (1972–81)
- The Tomorrow Show (1973–82)
- The Richard Pryor Show (1977)
- America Alive! (1978–79)
- Barbara Mandrell & the Mandrell Sisters (1980–82)
- The Big Show (1980)
- The David Letterman Show (1980)
- Pink Lady and Jeff (1980)
- The Regis Philbin Show (1981–82)
- SCTV Network 90 (1981–83)
- Late Night with David Letterman (1982–93)
- Friday Night Videos (1983–95)
- Later (1988–2001)
- A Closer Look with Faith Daniels (1990–93)
- The Marsha Warfield Show (1990)
- Hot Country Nights (1991–92)
- One on One with John Tesh (1991–92)
- The Tonight Show with Jay Leno (1992–2009; 2010–14)
- Dr. Dean (1992)
- John and Leeza from Hollywood (1993–94)
- Late Night with Conan O'Brien (1993–2009)
- The Jane Whitney Show (1994)
- Leeza (1994–99)
- The Other Side (1994–95)
- Later Today (1999–2000)
- Today's Take (2000–17)
- Last Call with Carson Daly (2002–19)
- The Rerun Show (2002)
- Most Outrageous Moments (2005–06; 2008–09)
- In the Loop with iVillage (2006–07)
- Today with Kathie Lee and Hoda (2008–19)
- Late Night with Jimmy Fallon (2009–14)
- The Tonight Show with Conan O'Brien (2009–10)
- The Jay Leno Show (2009–10)
- Maya & Marty (2016)
- Megyn Kelly Today (2017–18)
- A Little Late with Lilly Singh (2019–21)

== Soap operas ==
Title	Premiere date	Finale	Notes	Seasons
These Are My Children	January 31, 1949	March 4, 1949		1
One Man's Family	November 4, 1949	June 21, 1952		3
Hawkins Falls, Population 6200	June 17, 1950	July 1, 1955		5
Miss Susan	March 12, 1951	December 28, 1951		1
Fairmeadows USA	1951	1952		1
Three Steps to Heaven	August 5, 1953	December 31, 1954		1
The Bennetts	1953	1953		1
Follow Your Heart	1953	1954		1
The World of Mr. Sweeney	June 30, 1954	December 1955		1
Concerning Miss Marlowe	July 5, 1954	July 1, 1955		1
First Love	July 5, 1954	December 30, 1955		1
Golden Windows	July 5, 1954	April 1, 1955		1
Modern Romances	October 4, 1954	May 12, 1958		5
The Greatest Gift	1954	1955		1
A Time to Live	1954	1954		1
A Date with Life	1955	1956		1
From These Roots	June 30, 1958	December 29, 1961		3
Young Doctor Malone	December 29, 1958	March 29, 1963		6
Kitty Foyle	1958	1958		1
Today Is Ours	1958	1958		1
The House on High Street	1959	1960		1
Our Five Daughters	January 2, 1962	September 28, 1962		1
Ben Jerrod	April 1, 1963	June 28, 1963		1
The Doctors	April 1, 1963	December 31, 1982		20
Another World	May 4, 1964	June 25, 1999		35
Moment of Truth	January 4, 1965	November 5, 1965		1
Morning Star	September 27, 1965	July 1, 1966		1
Paradise Bay	September 27, 1965	July 1, 1966		1
Days of Our Lives	November 8, 1965	September 8, 2022	Seasons 1–57 only Moved to Peacock for season 58–present	57
Hidden Faces	December 30, 1968	June 27, 1969		1
Bright Promise	September 29, 1969	March 31, 1972		3
Somerset	March 30, 1970	December 31, 1976		6
Return to Peyton Place	April 3, 1972	January 4, 1974		3
How to Survive a Marriage	January 7, 1974	April 17, 1975		1
Lovers and Friends	January 3, 1977	September 29, 1978		2
Texas	August 4, 1980	December 31, 1982		2
Search for Tomorrow	March 29, 1982	December 26, 1986	Seasons 31–35 only Seasons 1–30 aired on CBS	5
Santa Barbara	July 30, 1984	January 15, 1993		9
Generations	March 29, 1989	January 25, 1991		2
Sunset Beach	January 6, 1997	December 31, 1999		3
Passions	July 5, 1999	September 7, 2007	Seasons 1–8 only Moved to The 101 Network for season 9	8

== Film presentations ==
- NBC Saturday Night at the Movies (1961–78)
- The NBC Monday Movie (1963–2003)

== News programming ==
- Camel News Caravan (1949–56)
- The Huntley–Brinkley Report (1956–70)
- Weekend (1974–79)
- Early Today (1982–83)
- NBC News Overnight (1982–83)
- Monitor (1983)
- NBC News at Sunrise (1983–99)
- 1986 (1986)
- Real Life with Jane Pauley (1990–91)
- NBC Nightside (1991–98)
- Now with Tom Brokaw and Katie Couric (1993–94)
- 1st Look (2008–23)
- Rock Center with Brian Williams (2011–13)
- Sunday Night with Megyn Kelly (2017)
- Megyn Kelly Today (2017–18)

== Saturday mornings ==
- 2 Hip 4 TV (1988)
- 3-2-1 Penguins! (2006–09; 2010)
- 3-2-1 Penguins! and LarryBoy Stories (2006–2010)
- Adventure Camp (2003)
- The Adventures of Super Mario Bros. 3 (1990)
- ALF (1987–90)
- ALF Tales (1988–90)
- Alvin and the Chipmunks (1983–90)
- Around the World in Eighty Days (1972–73)
- Astro Boy (1966–78)
- Astroblast! (2014–16)
- The Atom Ant/Secret Squirrel Show (1965–67)
- Babar (2006–07; 2008; 2009–12)
- Baggy Pants and the Nitwits (1977)
- The Banana Splits Adventure Hour (1968–70)
- The Barkleys (1972)
- Batman and the Super 7 (1980–81)
- Big John, Little John (1976)
- Birdman and the Galaxy Trio (1967–68)
- The Bugaloos (1970–72)
- The Bullwinkle Show (1963–64; 1981–82)
- Buford and the Galloping Ghost (1978)
- Butch Cassidy and the Sundance Kids (1973)
- Camp Candy (1989–91)
- Captain N: The Game Master (1989–91)
- Casper and the Angels (1979)
- CB Bears (1977)
- The Chica Show (2013–16)
- Chip and Pepper's Cartoon Madness (1991–92)
- City Guys (1997–2001)
- Clangers (2015–16)
- The Completely Mental Misadventures of Ed Grimley (1988)
- Cool McCool (1966–67)
- The Daffy Duck Show (1978–82)
- Darcy's Wild Life (2004–06)
- Doctor Dolittle (1970–71)
- Dragon (2006–08)
- Drawing Power! (1980–81)
- Dynomutt, Dog Wonder (1980)
- Earth to Luna! (2015–16)
- Emergency +4 (1973–74)
- Endurance (2002–06)
- Fabulous Funnies (1978–79)
- Fireball XL5 (1963–65)
- Flight 29 Down (2005–06)
- The Flintstone Comedy Show (1980–81)
- The Flintstone Funnies (1982–84)
- The Flintstones (1967–70; 1981)
- Floogals (2016)
- Foofur (1986–88)
- Fred and Barney Meet the Shmoo (1979–80)
- Fred and Barney Meet the Thing (1979)
- The Funky Phantom (1980)
- Galaxy Goof-Ups (1978–79)
- The Gary Coleman Show (1982)
- Give (2016–18)
- Godzilla (1978–79)
- The Go-Go Globetrotters (1978)
- Going Bananas (1984)
- Gravedale High (1990)
- Gummi Bears (1985–88)
- Guys Next Door (1990–91)
- H.R. Pufnstuf (1969)
- Hang Time (1995–2000)
- Health + Happiness with Mayo Clinic (2018)
- The Hector Heathcote Show (1963–65)
- Here Comes the Grump (1969–70)
- Hong Kong Phooey (1980–81)
- Hoppity Hooper (1964–67)
- Hot Dog (1970–71)
- The Houndcats (1972)
- Howdy Doody (1947–60)
- I Am the Greatest: The Adventures of Muhammad Ali (1977)
- I'm Telling! (1987–88)
- The Incredible Hulk (1982–83)
- It's Punky Brewster (1985–86)
- Jacob Two-Two (2006–07; 2009)
- Jana of the Jungle (1978)
- Jane and the Dragon (2006–08; 2009–10; 2012)
- Jeff Corwin Unleashed (2005–06)
- The Jetsons (1965–67; 1971–76; 1979–81; 1982–83)
- Jim Henson's Fraggle Rock (1987)
- Jonny Quest (1978–79)
- Josie and the Pussycats (1975–76)
- Journey with Dylan Dreyer (2016–18)
- Justin Time (2012–14)
- The Karate Kid (1989)
- Kenny the Shark (2003–06)
- Kid 'n Play (1990)
- The Kid Super Power Hour with Shazam! (1981–82)
- Kidd Video (1984–85)
- King Leonardo and His Short Subjects (1960–63)
- Kissyfur (1986–88)
- The Krofft Superstar Hour (1978–79)
- Land of the Lost (1974–76)
- Larryboy: The Cartoon Adventures (2006–07)
- Lazer Tag Academy (1986)
- LazyTown (2012–16)
- The Magic School Bus (2010–12)
- Make Way for Noddy (2013–14)
- Mister T (1983–85)
- My Friend Rabbit (2007–09)
- Natutally, Danny Seo (2016–19)
- NBA Inside Stuff (1990–2002)
- The New Adventures of Huckleberry Finn (1968–69)
- The New Adventures of Flash Gordon (1979–82)
- The New Archie and Sabrina Hour (1977)
- The New Archies (1987)
- The New Fantastic Four (1978)
- The New Fred and Barney Show (1979)
- The New Shmoo (1979–80)
- Nina's World (2016)
- Noodle and Doodle (2012–16)
- One to Grow On (1983–89)
- Operation Junkyard (2002–03)
- Pajanimals (2012–14)
- Pearlie (2010–12)
- The Pink Panther Show (1969–78)
- Poppy Cat (2012–13; 2014–15)
- Postman Pat (2007–08)
- Prehistoric Planet (2002–03)
- ProStars (1991)
- The Red Hand Gang (1977)
- Return to the Planet of the Apes (1975)
- The Roman Holidays (1972)
- The Ruff and Reddy Show (1957–60; 1962–64)
- Ruff-Ruff, Tweet and Dave (2015–16)
- Run, Joe, Run (1974–75)
- Runaround (1972–73)
- Samson & Goliath (1967–68)
- Saturday Morning Videos (1990–92)
- Saved by the Bell (1989–93)
- Saved by the Bell: The New Class (1993–2000)
- Scout's Safari (2002–04)
- Sealab 2020 (1972)
- Search and Rescue: The Alpha Team (1977–78)
- The Secret Lives of Waldo Kitty (1975)
- The Shari Lewis Show (1960–63)
- Shelldon (2009–12)
- Shirley Temple's Storybook (1958–61)
- Shirt Tales (1982–83)
- Sigmund and the Sea Monsters (1973–75)
- Skunked TV (2004)
- The Smurfs (1981–89)
- Snorks (1984–87)
- Space Cats 1991–92)
- Space Ghost and Frankenstein Jr. (1976–77)
- The Space Kidettes (1966–67)
- Space Sentinels (1977)
- Space Stars (1981–82)
- Special Treat (1975-86)
- Spider-Man and His Amazing Friends (1981–83)
- Sport Billy (1982)
- Star Trek: The Animated Series (1973–74)
- Strange Days at Blake Holsey High (2002–06)
- The Super 6 (1966–69)
- The Super Globetrotters (1979)
- Super President (1967–68)
- Super Mario World (1991)
- Take a Giant Step/Talking with a Giant (1971–73)
- Telecomics (1950–51)
- Terrific Trucks (2016)
- Thundarr the Barbarian (1983)
- Thunder (1977–78)
- Time Warp Trio (2005–06)
- Top Cat (1965–66; 1967–69)
- Trading Spaces: Boys vs. Girls (2003–06)
- Tree Fu Tom (2013–16)
- Turbo Dogs (2008–09; 2010–12)
- Tutenstein (2003–06)
- Underdog (1964–66; 1968–70; 1972–73)
- VeggieTales (2006–09)
- The Voyager with Josh Garcia (2016–19)
- Watch Mr. Wizard (1951–65)
- Westwind (1975)
- Wheelie and the Chopper Bunch (1974)
- Wilderness Vet with Dr. Oakley (2016–18)
- The Wiggles (2012–13)
- Willa's Wild Life (2009–12)
- Wish Kid (1991)
- Yo Yogi! (1991)
- Yogi's Space Race (1978)
- Zou (2014)
- The Zula Patrol (2008–09; 2012)

== Specials ==
- One Hour in Wonderland (December 25, 1950)
- The Ford 50th Anniversary Show (June 15, 1953)
- Mister Magoo's Christmas Carol (December 18, 1962)
- The Story of Christmas (December 22, 1963)
- Return to Oz (February 9, 1964)
- Rudolph the Red-Nosed Reindeer (December 6, 1964)
- The Danny Thomas TV Family Reunion (February 14, 1965)
- The Jack Benny Hour (November 3, 1965)
- Frank Sinatra: A Man and His Music (November 24, 1965)
- The Jack Benny Hour (December 1, 1966)
- Jack and the Beanstalk (February 26, 1967)
- Cricket on the Hearth (December 18, 1967)
- The Fabulous Funnies (February 11, 1968)
- Carnival Nights (March 20, 1968)
- 20th Primetime Emmy Awards (May 19, 1968)
- Mitzi (October 14, 1968)
- The Tennessee Ernie Ford Special (November 16, 1968)
- Jack Benny's Bag (November 16, 1968)
- The Mouse on the Mayflower (November 23, 1968)
- Elvis (December 3, 1968)
- The Little Drummer Boy (December 19, 1968)
- The Bob Hope Christmas Special: Around the World with the USO (January 16, 1969)
- The Jack Benny Birthday Special (February 17, 1969)
- Mitzi's 2nd Special (October 13, 1969)
- Uncle Sam Magoo (February 15, 1970)
- The Return of the Smothers Brothers (February 16, 1970)
- Carol Channing's Mad English Tea Party (September 9, 1970)
- Jack Benny's 20th Anniversary TV Special (November 16, 1970)
- Swing Out, Sweet Land (November 29, 1970)
- Dick Van Dyke Meets Bill Cosby (December 5, 1970)
- Everything You Always Wanted to Know About Jack Benny But Were Afraid to Ask (March 10, 1971)
- 43rd Academy Awards (April 15, 1971)
- 23rd Primetime Emmy Awards (May 9, 1971)
- The Grand Opening of Walt Disney World (October 29, 1971)
- Festival at Ford's (November 15, 1971)
- 44th Academy Awards (April 10, 1972)
- The Special London Bridge Special (May 7, 1972)
- Liza with a "Z" (September 10, 1972)
- Timex All-Star Swing Festival (November 29, 1972)
- Tennessee Ernie Ford's White Christmas (December 23, 1972)
- Jack Benny's First Farewell Special (January 18, 1973)
- The Bob Hope Mardi Gras Special (March 7, 1973)
- 45th Academy Awards (March 27, 1973)
- Ann-Margret: When You're Smiling (April 4, 1973)
- Timex Presents Opryland U.S.A. (October 23, 1973)
- Sammy! The Sammy Davis, Jr. Special (November 16, 1973)
- Magnavox Presents Frank Sinatra (November 18, 1973)
- The Bear Who Slept Through Christmas (December 17, 1973)
- Jack Benny's Second Farewell Special (January 24, 1974)
- 46th Academy Awards (April 2, 1974)
- 26th Primetime Emmy Awards (May 28, 1974)
- The Dean Martin Celebrity Roast (October 31, 1974 – December 7, 1984)
- The 1974 Annual Las Vegas Entertainment Awards (November 20, 1974)
- Christmas with the Bing Crosbys (December 15, 1974)
- 47th Academy Awards (April 8, 1975)
- Texaco Presents: A Quarter Century of Bob Hope on Television (October 24, 1975)
- The First Christmas: The Story of the First Christmas Snow (December 19, 1975)
- Joys! (March 5, 1976)
- The First Easter Rabbit (April 9, 1976)
- Bob Hope's Bicentennial Star Spangled Spectacular (July 4, 1976)
- Bob Hope's World of Comedy (October 29, 1976)
- NBC: The First Fifty Years (November 21, 1976)
- Peter Pan (December 12, 1976)
- The Little Drummer Boy, Book II (December 13, 1976)
- Bob Hope's Christmas Comedy Special (December 13, 1976)
- Bob Hope's All-Star Comedy Spectacular from Lake Tahoe (January 21, 1977)
- King of the Beasts (April 9, 1977)
- Ann-Margret: Rhinestone Cowgirl (April 26, 1977)
- Mac Davis: Sounds Like Home (June 16, 1977)
- US Against the World (September 7, 1977)
- 29th Primetime Emmy Awards (September 11, 1977)
- Life Goes to War: Hollywood and the Home Front (September 18, 1977)
- NBC: The First Fifty Years – A Closer Look (October 23, 1977)
- A Flintstone Christmas (December 7, 1977)
- The Bob Hope All Star Christmas Comedy Special (December 19, 1977)
- The Fourth King (December 23, 1977)
- 50 Years of Country Music (January 22, 1978)
- NBC: The First Fifty Years – A Closer Look, Part Two (January 31, 1978)
- A Special Valentine with the Family Circus (February 10, 1978)
- A Tribute to 'Mr. Television' Milton Berle (March 26, 1978)
- The Flintstones: Little Big League (April 6, 1978)
- Happy Birthday, Bob (May 29, 1978)
- NBC Salutes the 25th Anniversary of the Wonderful World of Disney (September 13–17, 1978)
- Witch's Night Out (October 27, 1978)
- Steve Martin: A Wild and Crazy Guy (November 22, 1978)
- A Mac Davis Special: Christmas Odyssey – 2010 (December 12, 1978)
- Bob Hope All Star Christmas Special (December 22, 1978)
- The Stingiest Man in Town (December 23, 1978)
- Legends of the Superheroes (January 18 – 25, 1979)
- Cher... and Other Fantasies (March 7, 1979)
- Bob Hope on the Road to China (September 16, 1979)
- The Flintstones Meet Rockula and Frankenstone (October 30, 1979)
- Casper's Halloween Special (October 30, 1979)
- The Berenstain Bears' Christmas Tree (December 3, 1979)
- The Little Rascals Christmas Special (December 3, 1979)
- Jack Frost (December 13, 1979)
- Casper's First Christmas (December 18, 1979)
- A Family Circus Christmas (December 18, 1979)
- A Christmas Special... With Love, Mac Davis (December 24, 1979)
- Sinatra: The First 40 Years (January 3, 1980)
- Sensational Shocking Wonderful Wacky 70's (January 4, 1980)
- Lucy Moves to NBC (February 8, 1980)
- Daffy Duck's Easter Show (April 1, 1980)
- Last of the Red-Hot Dragons (April 1, 1980)
- Mac Davis 10th Anniversary Special: I Still Believe in Music (May 20, 1980)
- 32nd Primetime Emmy Awards (September 7, 1980)
- The Flintstones' New Neighbors (September 26, 1980)
- The Harlem Globetrotters Meet Snow White (September 27—October 18, 1980)
- Bob Hope for President (November 1, 1980)
- The Flintstones: Fred's Final Fling (November 7, 1980)
- George Burns in Nashville??? (November 13, 1980)
- Daffy Duck's Thanks-for-Giving Special (November 20, 1980)
- The Berenstain Bears Meet Bigpaw (November 20, 1980)
- Alan King's Thanksgiving Special: What Have We Got to Be Thankful For? (November 25, 1980)
- The Bob Hope Christmas Show and All-Star Comedy Special (December 16, 1980)
- A Love Letter to Jack Benny (February 5, 1981)
- The Berenstain Bears' Easter Surprise (April 14, 1981)
- Dennis the Menace in Mayday for Mother (May 8, 1981)
- Here Come the Smurfs (June 19, 1981)
- The Funtastic World of Hanna-Barbera Arena Show (June 25, 1981)
- The Flintstones: Wind-Up Wilma (October 4, 1981)
- The Flintstones: Jogging Fever (October 11, 1981)
- The George Burns (Early) Early, Early Christmas Special (November 16, 1981)
- Sinatra: The Man and His Music (November 22, 1981)
- A Chipmunk Christmas (December 14, 1981)
- The Berenstain Bears' Comic Valentine (February 13, 1982)
- Women I Love: Beautiful But Funny (February 28, 1982)
- A Family Circus Easter (April 8, 1982)
- The Smurfs Springtime Special (April 8, 1982)
- George Burns and Other Sex Symbols (November 8, 1982)
- The Smurfs Christmas Special (December 12, 1982)
- Christmas in Washington (December 13, 1982—December 1997)
- The Merriest of the Merry: Bob Hope's Christmas Show, A Bagful of Comedy (December 20, 1982)
- My Smurfy Valentine (February 13, 1983)
- The Berenstain Bears Play Ball (May 6, 1983)
- Happy Birthday, Bob! (May 23, 1983)
- Big Bird in China (May 29, 1983)
- George Burns Celebrates 80 Years in Show Business (September 19, 1983)
- Bob Hope's Salute to NASA: 25 Years of Reaching for the Stars (September 19, 1983)
- 35th Primetime Emmy Awards (September 25, 1983)
- Deck the Halls with Wacky Walls (December 11, 1983)
- Bob Hope's USO Christmas in Beirut (January 15, 1984)
- I Love the Chipmunks Valentine Special (February 12, 1984)
- The Stars Salute the U.S. Olympic Team (March 5, 1984)
- The Homemade Comedy Special (April 8, 1984)
- The Smurfic Games (May 20, 1984)
- Bob Hope's Unrehearsed Antics of the Stars (September 28, 1984)
- Mickey's Christmas Carol (December 10, 1984)
- A Christmas Dream (December 16, 1984)
- It's Ho-Ho Hope's Jolly Christmas Hour (December 16, 1984)
- Smurfily Ever After (February 13, 1985)
- Disneyland's 30th Anniversary Celebration (February 18, 1985)
- A Chipmunk Reunion (April 13, 1985)
- Motown Returns to the Apollo (May 19, 1985)
- Bob Hope Buys NBC? (September 17, 1985)
- Andy Williams and the NBC Kids Search for Santa (December 20, 1985)
- NBC 60th Anniversary Celebration (May 12, 1986)
- Disneyland's Summer Vacation Party (May 23, 1986)
- Bob Hope's High-Flying Birthday (May 26, 1986)
- 38th Primetime Emmy Awards (September 21, 1986)
- Amy Grant: Headin' Home for the Holidays (December 21, 1986)
- Down and Out with Donald Duck (March 22, 1987)
- Andy Williams and the NBC Kids: Easter in Rome (April 17, 1987)
- Disney's Golden Anniversary of Snow White and the Seven Dwarfs (May 22, 1987)
- An All New Adventure of Disney's Sport Goofy (May 27, 1987)
- Sport Goofy in Soccermania (May 27, 1987)
- 'Tis the Season to Be Smurfy (December 13, 1987)
- Motown Merry Christmas (December 14, 1987)
- Disney's Magic in the Magic Kingdom (February 12, 1988)
- Happy Birthday, Bob: 50 Stars Salute Your 50 Years with NBC (May 16, 1988)
- Mickey's 60th Birthday (November 13, 1988)
- Bob Hope's Jolly Christmas Show (December 17, 1988)
- Seasons Greetings: An Evening with John Williams and the Boston Pops Orchestra (December 23, 1988)
- Sesame Street... 20 Years & Still Counting (April 7, 1989)
- All-Star Tribute to Kareem Abdul-Jabbar (May 12, 1989)
- Hound Town (September 1, 1989)
- Bob Hope's Love Affair with Lucy (September 23, 1989)
- The Wickedest Witch (October 30, 1989)
- Spy Magazine Presents How to Be Famous (April 4, 1990)
- Cartoon All-Stars to the Rescue (April 21, 1990)
- The Muppets at Walt Disney World (May 6, 1990)
- ...Where's Rodney? (June 11, 1990)
- The Jackie Bison Show (July 2, 1990)
- Turner & Hooch (July 9, 1990)
- Rockin' Through the Decades (December 9, 1990)
- A Very Retail Christmas (December 24, 1990)
- Bob Hope's Christmas Cheer from Saudi Arabia (January 12, 1991)
- Bob Hope and Other Young Comedians: The World Laughs, Young and Old (March 14, 1992)
- Noël (December 4, 1992)
- Inspector Gadget Saves Christmas (December 4, 1992)
- Bob Hope's Four-Star Christmas Fiesta from San Antonio (December 19, 1992)
- Bob Hope: The First 90 Years (May 14, 1993)
- The Defense Rests: A Tribute to Raymond Burr (October 22, 1993)
- The Town Santa Forgot (December 3, 1993)
- The Twelve Days of Christmas (December 3, 1993)
- Bob Hope's Bag Full of Christmas Memories (December 15, 1993)
- Legend to Legend Night: A Celebrity Cavalcade (December 28, 1993)
- You're in the Super Bowl, Charlie Brown (January 18, 1994)
- Bob Hope's Birthday Memories (May 14, 1994)
- Bob Hope's Young Comedians: Making America Laugh (August 27, 1994)
- Hopes for the Holidays (December 14, 1994)
- Bob Hope's Young Comedians: A New Generation of Laughs (March 25, 1995)
- Bob Hope: Memories of World War II (August 5, 1995)
- The Omen (September 8, 1995)
- Kelsey Grammer Salutes Jack Benny (November 30, 1995)
- Bob Hope: Laughing with the Presidents (November 23, 1996)
- Monsters vs. Aliens: Mutant Pumpkins from Outer Space (October 28, 2009)
- Merry Madagascar (November 17, 2009)
- Scared Shrekless (October 28, 2010)
- Kung Fu Panda Holiday (November 24, 2010)
- Peter Pan Live! (December 4, 2014)
- The Wiz Live! (December 3, 2015)
- Hairspray Live! (December 7, 2016)
- Trolls Holiday (November 24, 2017)
- Jesus Christ Superstar Live in Concert (April 1, 2018)
- How to Train Your Dragon: Homecoming (December 3, 2019)
- Trolls: Holiday in Harmony (November 26, 2021)

== Pro wrestling ==
- WWE Saturday Night's Main Event (1985–91; 2006–09; 2024–25)
- WWF The Main Event (1988–91)
- WWE Tribute to the Troops (2008–14)
- WWE WrestleMania (2010–14)

== Sports programming ==
- Army–Navy Game (1945–53; 1955–59; 1964–65)
- Gillette Cavalcade of Sports (1946–60)
- Major League Baseball on NBC (1947–89; 1994–2000)
- Belmont Stakes (1950–52; 01–2005; 2011–22)
- CFL on NBC (1954; 1982; 2012–13)
- Blue–Gray Football Classic (1958–63)
- NCAA Cotton Bowl (1953–57; 1993–95)
- NBA on NBC (1954–62; 1990–2002)
- NCAA Rose Bowl (1952–88)
- NCAA Sugar Bowl (1959–69)
- NCAA Orange Bowl (1965–95)
- NCAA Fiesta Bowl (1978–95)
- NHL on NBC (1966; 1972–75; 1990–94; 2005–21)
- FIFA World Cup (1966; 1986)
- Sportsworld (1978–92)
- CART (1979–90; 1994)
- The Championships, Wimbledon (1969–2011)
- PBA on NBC (1984–91)
- NCAA Citrus Bowl (1984–85)
- Superstars (1985–90)
- NCAA Outback Bowl (1988–92)
- Association of Volleyball Professionals (1990–2009)
- Gator Bowl (1996–2006)
- WNBA on NBC (1997–2002)
- American Le Mans Series (1999–2004; 2007–08)
- XFL on NBC (2001)
- 2002 FIBA World Championship (2002)
- AFL on NBC (2003–06)
- Champ Car World Series (2005–07)
- Hambletonian Stakes (2007–12)
- MLS on NBC (2012–14)
- Formula One on NBC (2013–17)
- Red Bull Global Rallycross (2014–17)
- Premier Boxing Champions (2015–17)
- IndyCar Series on NBC (2019–24)
- USFL (2022–23)

== Television films ==
=== 1960s ===
- See How They Run (October 7, 1964)
- The Hanged Man (November 18, 1964)
- Fame Is the Name of the Game (November 26, 1966)
- The Doomsday Flight (December 13, 1966)
- How I Spent My Summer Vacation (January 7, 1967)
- The Longest Hundred Miles (January 21, 1967)
- Stranger on the Run (October 31, 1967)
- Companions in Nightmare (November 23, 1968)
- Something for a Lonely Man (November 26, 1968)
- Trial Run (January 18, 1969)
- Fear No Evil (March 3, 1969)
- The Lonely Profession (October 21, 1969)
- Destiny of a Spy (October 27, 1969)
- Run a Crooked Mile (November 18, 1969)

=== 1970s ===
- Ritual of Evil (February 23, 1970)
- Lost Flight (August 12, 1970)
- A Clear and Present Danger (August 29, 1970)
- The Aquarians (October 24, 1970)
- The Intruders (November 10, 1970)
- Breakout (December 8, 1970)
- Who Killed the Mysterious Mr. Foster? (February 1, 1971)
- Hitched (March 31, 1971)
- River of Mystery (October 1, 1971)
- The Harness (November 12, 1971)
- The Snow Goose (November 15, 1971)
- Cutter (January 26, 1972)
- The Man Who Came to Dinner (November 29, 1972)
- The Judge and Jake Wyler (December 2, 1972)
- The Great Man's Whiskers (February 13, 1973)
- Poor Devil (February 14, 1973)
- The Norliss Tapes (February 21, 1973)
- Partners in Crime (March 24, 1973)
- Chase (March 24, 1973)
- Savage (March 31, 1973)
- Drive Hard, Drive Fast (September 11, 1973)
- The Questor Tapes (January 23, 1974)
- A Case of Rape (February 20, 1974)
- Rex Harrison Presents Stories of Love (May 1, 1974)
- The Underground Man (May 6, 1974)
- The Cay (October 21, 1974)
- The Law (October 22, 1974)
- Brief Encounter (November 12, 1974)
- This Is the West That Was (December 17, 1974)
- Sarah T. - Portrait of a Teenage Alcoholic (February 11, 1975)
- The Last Day (February 15, 1975)
- One of Our Own (May 5, 1975)
- The Invisible Man (May 6, 1975)
- Guilty or Innocent: The Sam Sheppard Murder Case (November 17, 1975)
- The Manhunter (April 3, 1976)
- Law and Order (May 6, 1976)
- Gemini Man (May 10, 1976)
- The Return of the World's Greatest Detective (June 16, 1976)
- Sherlock Holmes in New York (October 18, 1976)
- Richie Brockelman: The Missing 24 Hours (October 27, 1976)
- The Savage Bees (November 22, 1976)
- Flood! (November 24, 1976)
- The Loneliest Runner (December 20, 1976)
- The City (January 12, 1977)
- Stonestreet: Who Killed the Centerfold Model? (January 16, 1977)
- Yesterday's Child (February 3, 1977)
- Tail Gunner Joe (February 6, 1977)
- Dead of Night (March 29, 1977)
- The Possessed (May 1, 1977)
- Code Name: Diamond Head (May 3, 1977)
- Fire! (May 8, 1977)
- Pine Canyon Is Burning (May 18, 1977)
- Spectre (May 21, 1977)
- The Man with the Power (May 24, 1977)
- Ransom for Alice! (June 2, 1977)
- Charlie Cobb: Nice Night for a Hanging (June 9, 1977)
- The 3,000 Mile Chase (June 16, 1977)
- Exo-Man (June 18, 1977)
- Sharon: Portrait of a Mistress (October 31, 1977)
- The Hobbit (November 27, 1977)
- The Ghost of Flight 401 (February 18, 1978)
- Love Is Not Enough (June 12, 1978)
- Frankie & Annette: The Second Time Around (November 18, 1978)
- Someone's Watching Me! (November 29, 1978)
- The New Adventures of Heidi (December 13, 1978)
- Mandrake (January 24, 1979)
- Women in White (February 8, 1979)
- Sooner or Later (March 25, 1979)
- The Legend of the Golden Gun (April 10, 1979)
- When Hell Was in Session (October 8, 1979)
- Undercover with the KKK (October 23, 1979)
- The Man in the Santa Claus Suit (December 23, 1979)

=== 1980s ===
- Brave New World (March 7, 1980)
- Alex and the Doberman Gang (April 11, 1980)
- Cry of the Innocent (June 19, 1980)
- The Great American Traffic Jam (October 2, 1980)
- Enola Gay: The Men, the Mission, the Atomic Bomb (November 23, 1980)
- Children of Divorce (November 24, 1980)
- The Day the Women Got Even (December 4, 1980)
- Elvis and the Beauty Queen (March 1, 1981)
- The Archer: Fugitive from the Empire (April 12, 1981)
- The Star Maker (May 11, 1981)
- Death of a Centerfold: The Dorothy Stratten Story (November 1, 1981)
- Fire on the Mountain (November 23, 1981)
- Child Bride of Short Creek (December 7, 1981)
- Two Guys from Muck (March 29, 1982)
- Sister, Sister (June 7, 1982)
- Flash Gordon: The Greatest Adventure of All (August 21, 1982)
- The Facts of Life Goes to Paris (September 25, 1982)
- Knight Rider (September 26, 1982)
- Remembrance of Love (December 6, 1982)
- The Invisible Woman (February 13, 1983)
- The Night the Bridge Fell Down (February 28, 1983)
- Jacobo Timerman: Prisoner Without a Name, Cell Without a Number (May 22, 1983)
- Adam (October 10, 1983)
- The Jerk, Too (January 6, 1984)
- Family Secrets (May 13, 1984)
- Hunter (September 18, 1984)
- The Burning Bed (October 8, 1984)
- Shattered Vows (October 29, 1984)
- Victims for Victims: The Theresa Saldana Story (November 12, 1984)
- Florence Nightingale (April 7, 1985)
- Wallenberg: A Hero's Story (April 8–9, 1985)
- Playing with Fire (April 14, 1985)
- Family Ties Vacation (September 23, 1985)
- Streets of Justice (November 10, 1985)
- Perry Mason Returns (December 1, 1985)
- Return to Mayberry (April 13, 1986)
- Perry Mason: The Case of the Notorious Nun (May 25, 1986)
- Adam: His Song Continues (September 29, 1986)
- Perry Mason: The Case of the Notorious Nun (November 9, 1986)
- Christmas Eve (December 22, 1986)
- Blood Vows: The Story of a Mafia Wife (January 18, 1987)
- Convicted: A Mother's Story (February 2 ,1987)
- Perry Mason: The Case of the Lost Love (February 23, 1987)
- The Facts of Life Down Under (February 15, 1987)
- The Abduction of Kari Swenson (March 8, 1987)
- Stone Fox (March 30, 1987)
- The Return of the Six Million Dollar Man and the Bionic Woman (May 17, 1987)
- Perry Mason: The Case of the Sinister Spirit (May 24, 1987)
- Bates Motel (July 5, 1987)
- Perry Mason: The Case of the Murdered Madam (October 4, 1987)
- Stamp of a Killer (November 1, 1987)
- Perry Mason: The Case of the Scandalous Scoundrel (November 15, 1987)
- Fatal Confession: A Father Dowling Mystery (November 30, 1987)
- Downpayment on Murder (December 6, 1987)
- The Little Match Girl (December 21, 1987)
- The Ann Jillian Story (January 4, 1988)
- Man Against the Mob (January 10, 1988)
- Perry Mason: The Case of the Avenging Ace (February 28, 1988)
- Crash Course (January 17, 1988)
- The Taking of Flight 847: The Uli Derickson Story (May 2, 1988)
- Perry Mason: The Case of the Lady in the Lake (May 15, 1988)
- The Incredible Hulk Returns (May 22, 1988)
- To Heal a Nation (May 29, 1988)
- A Father's Homecoming (June 19, 1988)
- Nightingales (June 27, 1988)
- Out of Time (July 17, 1988)
- Desert Rats (August 7, 1988)
- Shooter (September 11, 1988)
- The People Across the Lake (October 3, 1988)
- Dear John (October 6, 1988)
- The Secret Life of Kathy McCormick (October 7, 1988)
- Going to the Chapel (October 9, 1988)
- Winnie (October 10, 1988)
- Crossing the Mob (October 14, 1988)
- Double Standard (October 17, 1988)
- Glitz (October 21, 1988)
- Dance 'til Dawn (October 23, 1988)
- A Stoning in Fulham County (October 24, 1988)
- The Great Escape II: The Untold Story (November 6–7, 1988)
- Too Good to Be True (November 14, 1988)
- Goddess of Love (November 20, 1988)
- Take My Daughters, Please (November 21, 1988)
- Killer Instinct (November 22, 1988)
- In the Line of Duty: The F.B.I. Murders (November 27, 1988)
- Shootdown (November 28, 1988)
- Maybe Baby (December 5, 1988)
- I'll Be Home for Christmas (December 12, 1988)
- She Was Marked for Murder (December 18, 1988)
- Marcus Welby, M.D.: A Holiday Affair (December 19, 1988)
- Miracle at Beekman's Place (December 26, 1988)
- The Cover Girl and the Cop (January 16, 1989)
- She Knows Too Much (January 29, 1989)
- Full Exposure: The Sex Tapes Scandal (February 5, 1989)
- Perry Mason: The Case of the Lethal Lesson (February 12, 1989)
- The Hijacking of the Achille Lauro (February 13, 1989)
- Swimsuit (February 19, 1989)
- Original Sin (February 20, 1989)
- The Revenge of Al Capone (February 26, 1989)
- Those She Left Behind (March 6, 1989)
- Quantum Leap (March 26, 1989)
- Your Mother Wears Combat Boots (March 27, 1989)
- The Case of the Hillside Stranglers (April 2, 1989)
- Love Is Murder (April 3, 1989)
- Perry Mason: The Case of the Musical Murder (April 9, 1989)
- Baywatch: Panic at Malibu Pier (April 23, 1989)
- Bionic Showdown: The Six Million Dollar Man and the Bionic Woman (April 30, 1989)
- Dark Holiday (May 1, 1989)
- The Trial of the Incredible Hulk (May 7, 1989)
- Amityville 4: The Evil Escapes (May 12, 1989)
- Nasty Boys (September 22, 1989)
- Settle the Score (October 30, 1989)
- Perry Mason: The Case of the All-Star Assassin (November 19, 1989)
- Turn Back the Clock (November 20, 1989)
- Little White Lies (November 27, 1989)
- Man Against the Mob: The Chinatown Murders (December 10, 1989)
- Lady in the Corner (December 11, 1989)

=== 1990s ===
- Without Her Consent (January 14, 1990)
- Perry Mason: The Case of the Poisoned Pen (January 21, 1990)
- The Death of the Incredible Hulk (February 18, 1990)
- Too Young to Die? (February 26, 1990)
- The Old Man and the Sea (March 25, 1990)
- The Girl Who Came Between Them (April 1, 1990)
- Fall from Grace (April 29, 1990)
- Hiroshima: Out of the Ashes (August 6, 1990)
- Joshua's Heart (September 10, 1990)
- Babies (September 17, 1990)
- Casey's Gift: For Love of a Child (September 24, 1990)
- The Love She Sought (October 21, 1990)
- Thanksgiving Day (November 19, 1990)
- In the Line of Duty: A Cop for the Killing (November 25, 1990)
- Night Visions (November 30, 1990)
- Good Cops, Bad Cops (December 9, 1990)
- The Marla Hanson Story (February 4, 1991)
- The Chase (February 10, 1991)
- The Summer My Father Grew Up (March 3, 1991)
- Daughters of Privilege (March 17, 1991)
- Don't Touch My Daughter (April 7, 1991)
- White Hot: The Mysterious Murder of Thelma Todd (May 5, 1991)
- In the Line of Duty: Manhunt in the Dakotas (May 12, 1991)
- Knight Rider 2000 (May 19, 1991)
- Wild Texas Wind (September 23, 1991)
- And While She Was Gone (September 29, 1991)
- I Still Dream of Jeannie (October 20, 1991)
- She Says She's Innocent (October 28, 1991)
- The Return of Eliot Ness (November 10, 1991)
- Deadly Medicine (November 11, 1991)
- Deception: A Mother's Secret (November 24, 1991)
- A Mother's Justice (November 25, 1991)
- The Story Lady (December 9, 1991)
- Back to the Streets of San Francisco (January 27, 1992)
- In the Best Interest of the Children (February 16, 1992)
- What She Doesn't Know (February 23, 1992)
- Woman with a Past (March 2, 1992)
- In the Shadow of a Killer (April 27, 1992)
- In the Line of Duty: Street War (May 11, 1992)
- Yesterday Today (July 3, 1992)
- Danger Island (September 20, 1992)
- In the Deep Woods (October 26, 1992)
- Fatal Memories (November 9, 1992)
- Revenge on the Highway (December 6, 1992)
- Love Can Be Murder (December 14, 1992)
- Through the Eyes of a Killer (December 15, 1992)
- Amy Fisher: My Story (December 28, 1992)
- Elvis and the Colonel: The Untold Story (January 10, 1993)
- Darkness Before Dawn (February 15, 1993)
- Miracle on Interstate 880 (February 22, 1993)
- Born Too Soon (April 25, 1993)
- The Return of Ironside (May 4, 1993)
- For the Love of My Child: The Anissa Ayala Story (May 10, 1993)
- In the Line of Duty: Ambush in Waco (May 23, 1993)
- Without Warning: Terror in the Woods (May 26, 1993)
- The Flood: Who Will Save Our Children? (October 10, 1993)
- House of Secrets (November 1, 1993)
- A Matter of Justice (November 7, 1993)
- Fatal Deception: Mrs. Lee Harvey Oswald (November 15, 1993)
- A Family Torn Apart (November 21, 1993)
- Staying Afloat (November 26, 1993)
- David Copperfield (December 10, 1993)
- A Perry Mason Mystery: The Case of the Wicked Wives (December 17, 1993)
- Secret Sins of the Father (January 9, 1994)
- Murder Between Friends (January 10, 1994)
- In the Line of Duty: The Price of Vengeance (January 23, 1994)
- I Know My Son Is Alive (February 20, 1994)
- Stalker: Shadow of Obsession (April 10, 1994)
- Search and Rescue (March 27, 1994)
- Heart of a Child (May 9, 1994)
- A Perry Mason Mystery: The Case of the Lethal Lifestyle (May 10, 1994)
- Ray Alexander: A Taste for Justice (May 13, 1994)
- Tears and Laughter: The Joan and Melissa Rivers Story (May 15, 1994)
- Jonathan Stone: Threat of Innocence (May 18, 1994)
- Justice in a Small Town (September 23, 1994)
- A Friend to Die For (September 26, 1994)
- A Perry Mason Mystery: The Case of the Grimacing Governor (November 9, 1994)
- While Justice Sleeps (December 5, 1994)
- Take Me Home Again (December 18, 1994)
- In the Line of Duty: Kidnapped (March 12, 1995)
- Awake to Danger (March 13, 1995)
- A Perry Mason Mystery: The Case of the Jealous Jokester (April 10, 1995)
- The Return of Hunter: Everyone Walks in L.A. (April 30, 1995)
- Ray Alexander: A Menu for Murder (May 20, 1995)
- Problem Child 3: Junior in Love (May 13, 1995)
- Beauty's Revenge (September 25, 1995)
- In the Line of Duty: Hunt for Justice (October 1, 1995)
- Terror in the Shadows (October 16, 1995)
- Her Hidden Truth (November 12, 1995)
- Visitors of the Night (November 27, 1995)
- Deadly Family Secrets (December 4, 1995)
- Gridlock (January 14, 1996)
- The Babysitter's Seduction (January 22, 1996)
- In the Line of Duty: Smoke Jumpers (February 11, 1996)
- Terminal (February 12, 1996)
- No One Would Tell (May 6, 1996)
- Twisted Desire (May 13, 1996)
- A Friend's Betrayal (May 19, 1996)
- Abducted: A Father's Love (May 31, 1996)
- Remembrance (September 2, 1996)
- The Lottery (September 29, 1996)
- Mother, May I Sleep with Danger? (September 30, 1996)
- Buried Secrets (November 4, 1996)
- What Kind of Mother Are You? (November 18, 1996)
- In the Line of Duty: Blaze of Glory (January 5, 1997)
- Dying to Belong (February 24, 1997)
- NightScream (April 14, 1997)
- On the Edge of Innocence (April 20, 1997)
- Perfect Body (September 8, 1997)
- Silencing Mary (March 8, 1998)
- I've Been Waiting for You (March 22, 1998)
- Brave New World (April 19, 1998)
- Exiled: A Law & Order Movie (November 8, 1998)
- The Tempest (December 13, 1998)
- Vanished Without a Trace (February 1, 1999)
- The Jesse Ventura Story (May 23, 1999)
- Road Rage (October 3, 1999)
- Mr. Rock 'n' Roll: The Alan Freed Story (October 31, 1999)
- The Magical Legend of the Leprechauns (November 7, 1999)

=== 2000s ===
- Little Richard (February 20, 2000)
- Dying to Dance (August 12, 2001)
- Carrie (November 4, 2002)
- It's a Very Merry Muppet Christmas Movie (November 29, 2002)
- Martha, Inc.: The Story of Martha Stewart (May 19, 2003)
