= Chipped beef =

Sliced dried beef product

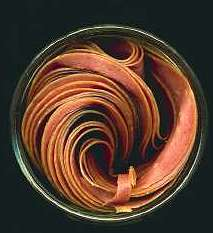
Modern chipped beef product in packaging

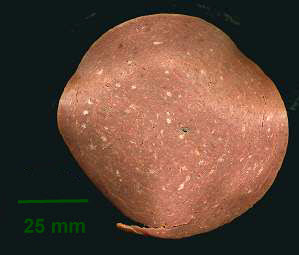
Individual sliver

Chipped beef is a form of pressed, salted and dried beef that has been sliced into thin pieces. Some makers smoke the dried beef for more flavor. The modern product consists of small, thin, flexible leaves of partially dried beef, generally sold compressed together in jars or flat in plastic packets. The processed meat producer Hormel once described it as "an air-dried product that is similar to bresaola, but not as tasty."

== History ==
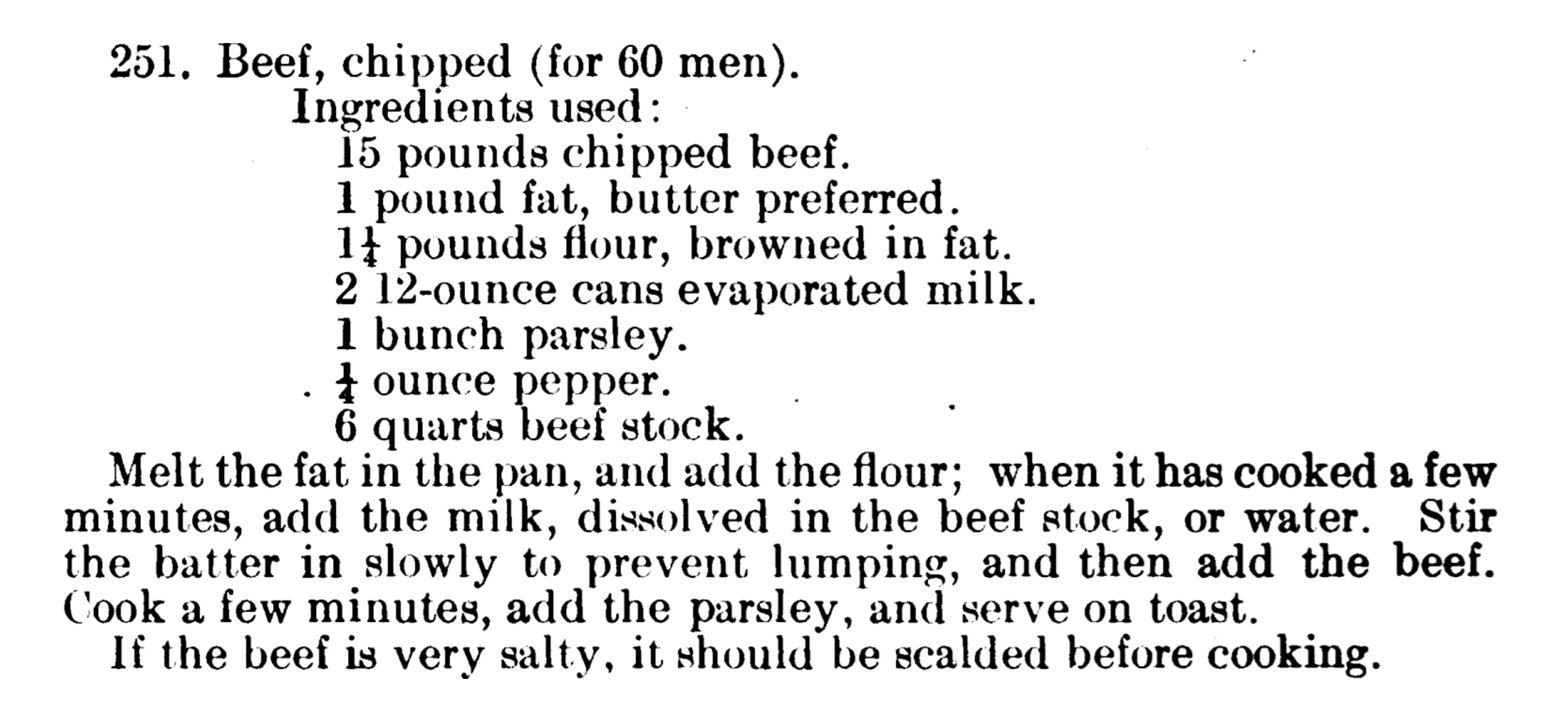
"Beef, chipped" in Manual for Army Cooks (1910)

Chipped beef on toast (or creamed chipped beef on toast) is a dish comprising a white sauce and rehydrated slivers of dried beef, served on toasted bread. In the United States, chipped beef on toast was commonly served to service members of the United States Armed Forces from World War I through Vietnam, where it had a mixed reception. According to We Are The Mighty, a recipe for chipped beef first appears in the 1910 Manual for Army Cooks.

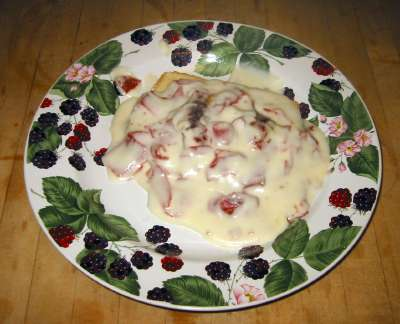
Chipped beef on toast, served on a plate with bechamel sauce

Chipped beef was popular throughout the 1930s in the United States. After rehydrating the beef in boiling water, cooks served it creamed, in scrambled eggs, or as part of a sauce similar to the American Welsh rarebit sauce. Creamed chipped beef, served over toast, split biscuits, or waffles was considered a masculine, hearty meal. A more unusual application was put forward by the cooking radio show host John MacPherson, who on his show The Mystery Chef aimed to produce affordable, gourmet meals. To produce such a meal with chipped beef, MacPherson combined it with pineapple, which by this time remained a popular ingredient.

Another dish eaten in the 1930s using chipped beef was known as "Burning Bush", and was made with cream cheese inserted into an eggplant. A contemporary cookbook explained: "Inserted into a polished eggplant to resemble a bush in autumn foliage, these are too attractive not to be noticed." Into the 1940s, Burning Bush was a popular dish served at cocktail parties.

Creamed chipped beef fell from popularity after World War II, when American troops had grown sick of it, nicknaming it "SOS" ("Shit on a Shingle"). (Note: Shit on a Shingle was also used to refer to a dish of creamed, canned corned beef also served on toast.) Shingle had become a term for slices of toast around 1935 in the US army, becoming most used in the phrase "Shit on a Shingle" during World War II.

By the mid-1990s, chipped beef was difficult to find in US supermarkets.

== See also ==
- Biscuits and gravy
- List of dried foods
- List of toast dishes
- Military rations

== Sources ==
- Lovegren, Sylvia (1995). Fashionable Food: Seven Decades of Food Fads. New York: Macmillan. ISBN 978-0-02-575705-9.
