= Edward Edwards (actor) =

American film and television actor

- Occupations: Film and television actor
- Years active: 1974–present

Edward Edwards is an American film and television actor.

Edwards attended and graduated at Sunset High School in Dallas, Texas. He had minor roles in over fifty different television shows since his acting debut in 1974, in shows such as The Dukes of Hazzard, The Ropers, Family Ties, ALF, Fresh Prince Of Bel Air, House, Desperate Housewives, 24, Commander in Chief, Boston Legal, Without a Trace, CSI: Crime Scene Investigation, NYPD Blue, Monk, Criminal Minds, Frasier and JAG.

Edwards has also appeared in minor roles in films such as Gang Related (1997), Bounce (2000) and Duplex (2003).

== Filmography ==
Year	Title	Role	Notes
1981	Elvis and the Beauty Queen	Sam Thompson	
1987	RoboCop	Officer Manson	
1997	Gang Related	Sgt. Gardner	
1998	Children of the Corn V: Fields of Terror	Lilly's Father	
2000	Bounce	Ron Wachter	
2000	Stalled	Ward	
2003	Duplex	Antique Dealer	
2006	Jesse Stone: Death in Paradise	Hank Bishop	
2009	Wake	Mr. Reitman	
2012	The Undershepherd	Doctor	
2013	Last Vegas	Floor Manager	
