= Richard C. Goddard =

American set decorator

- Born: Richard Curtis Goddard
- Occupation: Set decorator
- Years active: 1973–2006

Richard Curtis Goddard is an American set decorator. He won two Primetime Emmy Awards in the category Outstanding Art Direction for his work on the television program Little Women, and the television film Ziegfeld: The Man and His Women.

In 2007, he was awarded the Lifetime Achievement Award by the Set Decorators Society of America.
