= Ann Dusenberry =

American actress (b. 1953)

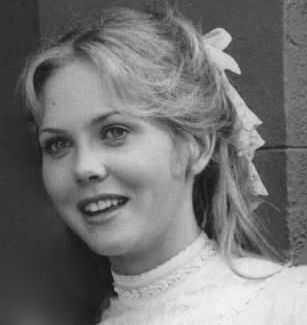
- Dusenberry in Captains and the Kings (1976)
- Born: September 13, 1953 (age 72); Tucson, Arizona, U.S.
- Education: Occidental College
- Occupation: Actress
- Years active: 1972–present
- Known for: Jaws 2; Heart Beat; Cutter's Way; Little Women
- Spouse: Brad Fiedel (m. 1993)
- Children: 2

Ann Dusenberry (born September 13, 1953) is an American film, television, and stage actress. She appeared in about 50 film and television productions from the early 1970s to the early 1990s. Among her best-known roles are those of Tina Wilcox in the horror film Jaws 2 (1978), Stevie in the romantic drama film Heart Beat (1980) and Valerie in the thriller Cutter's Way (1981). After her retirement from the film industry in 1992, she remained active as an actress on stage, performing sporadically.

== Biography ==
=== Early life and education ===
Ann Dusenberry was born in Tucson, Arizona as the daughter of Bruce and Katie Dusenberry. Dusenberry studied theater arts for four years, first at the University of Arizona, then Occidental College, where she earned her degree. She got her first role by circulating her resume and photograph within the Universal Studios offices using internal envelopes obtained by her boyfriend, a truck driver for Universal. She then signed a seven-year contract with Universal.

=== Acting career ===
Dusenberry made her acting debut in 1972 in Pocket Money followed by a small role as a barmaid in the film White Line Fever (1975). She gained attention in 1978 for the role of Tina Wilcox in Jaws 2, the sequel to Steven Spielberg's 1975 classic. Dusenberry was hired as a contract actress by Universal for the role. Due to the long shooting time away from her home in Los Angeles, she actually had no interest in playing the role. While the film originally directed by John D. Hancock, he was fired after a short time of shooting and replaced by Jeannot Szwarc. This also resulted in the dismissal of many actors who had already signed on. Dusenberry's role, however, was still expanded during script changes and she received co-starring credit. She had another success in 1978 with the role of Amy March in the miniseries Little Women, an adaptation of the novel of the same name. She also took on the role in the short-lived 1979 television series based on it, but the show was canceled after four episodes.

Dusenberry's best-known film appearances in the 1980s include her role as Stevie in Heart Beat alongside Nick Nolte, Sissy Spacek, and John Heard; and as Valerie in Cutter's Way alongside Jeff Bridges and Heard again. In the 1986 film The Men's Club, she again starred alongside Roy Scheider, her co-star from Jaws 2. In addition to her appearances in films, she mainly played roles for television. In 1977 she starred alongside Harrison Ford, shortly before the latter's breakthrough with Star Wars, in the television thriller The Possessed. Other television roles included that of Amory (aka Angel Collins) in Stonestreet: Who Killed the Centerfold Model? (1977) and the dual role of Joy Morgan and Elaine Steel in Killjoy (1981) alongside Kim Basinger. She also appeared in numerous successful series of the period, including Magnum, P.I. (1982), Remington Steele (1983) and Murder, She Wrote (1986 and 1987). In 1986, she starred as the daughter of Lucille Ball's character in the short-lived series Life with Lucy.

After co-starring in the 1992 thriller Play Nice and a guest appearance in the series The Commish (1992), she retired from acting in front of the camera. However, Dusenberry continues to be active as a stage actress. Among other roles, she played Mrs. Gibbs in the play Our Town (1998). Other plays have included 2014's Noises Off and 2021's Ripcord.

== Personal life ==
She is married to composer Brad Fiedel, with whom she lives in Santa Barbara, California. They have two daughters. She received an MA degree in Marriage and Family Therapy, and works as Artistic Director of the Actors' Conservatory Theatre in Santa Barbara.

== Filmography ==
=== Film ===
| Year | Title | Role | Notes |
|---|---|---|---|
| 1972 | Pocket Money | | |
| 1975 | White Line Fever | Barmaid | |
| 1975 | Speeding | Girl in Corvette | Short film |
| 1978 | Goodbye, Franklin High | Sharon Browne | |
| 1978 | Jaws 2 | Tina Wilcox | |
| 1978 | Tarzana | Thelma | Short film |
| 1980 | Heart Beat | Stevie | |
| 1981 | Cutter's Way | Valerie Duran | |
| 1982 | National Lampoon's Movie Madness | Dominique Corsaire | segment: Success Wanters |
| 1983 | Lies | Robyn Wallace | |
| 1985 | Basic Training | Melinda | |
| 1986 | The Men's Club | Page | |
| 1991 | Rich Girl | Additional Voices | Voice role |
| 1992 | Play Nice | Pam Crichmore | |
| 2012 | Roaring Camp | | Short film |

=== Television ===
| Year | Title | Role | Notes |
|---|---|---|---|
| 1976 | Captains and the Kings | Anne-Marie | 2 Episodes |
| 1976 | The Six Million Dollar Man | Clerk | Episode: "A Bionic Christmas Carol" |
| 1976 | McCloud | Peggy | Episode: "'Twas the Fight Before Christmas..." |
| 1977 | Emergency! | Candy Striper | Episode: "Loose Ends" |
| 1977 | Stonestreet: Who Killed the Centerfold Model? | Amory Osborn alias Angel Collins | Television film |
| 1977 | The Possessed | Weezie Sumner | Television film |
| 1978 | Eight Is Enough | Andrea Jenkins | Episode: "Poor Little Rich Girl" |
| 1978 | Little Women | Amy March | Miniseries |
| 1978 | Desperate Women | Joanna Dance | Television film |
| 1979 | Little Women | Amy March | 4 Episodes (Follow-up series to the 1978 miniseries) |
| 1979 | Buck Rogers in the 25th Century | Ariela Dyne | Episode: "Planet of the Amazon Women" |
| 1980 | The Secret War of Jackie's Girls | Donna | Television film |
| 1981 | Elvis and the Beauty Queen | Jeannie | Television film |
| 1981 | Killjoy | Joy Morgan / Elaine Steel | Television film |
| 1982 | Magnum, P.I. | Katrina Tremaine | Episode: "Italian Ice" |
| 1982 | Trapper John, M.D. | Maggie Nolan | Episode: "Medicine Man" |
| 1982 | Seven Brides for Seven Brothers | Molly McGraw | Episode: "I Love You Molly McGraw" |
| 1983 | Confessions of a Married Man | Jennifer | Television film |
| 1983 | The Family Tree | Molly Nichols Tanner | Episode: "Tess's Birthday" |
| 1983 | Remington Steele | Tracy Crockett / Roxie Tyler | Episode: "My Fair Steele" |
| 1983 | Simon & Simon | Frankie Gillard - Compulsive Gambler | Episode: "All Your Favourite Games" |
| 1984 | Hardcastle and McCormick | Casey O'Bannon | Episode: "Whistler's Pride" |
| 1984 | Emerald Point N.A.S. | Betsy | Episode: "Secrets" |
| 1984 | He's Not Your Son | Holly Barnes | Television film |
| 1985 | MacGruder and Loud | Elaine Kinney | Episode: "For Better or for Worse" |
| 1986 | Murder, She Wrote | Elizabeth Gordon | Episode: "Murder by Appointment Only" |
| 1986 | Long Time Gone | Marilyn | Television film |
| 1986 | Life with Lucy | Margo Barker McGibbon | Main role (13 Episodes) |
| 1987 | Murder, She Wrote | Carol Selby | Episode: "Simon Says, Color Me Dead" |
| 1988 | Jake and the Fatman | Leslie Randall | Episode: "It Had to Be You" |
| 1989 | Paradise | Lorna | Episode: "Treasure" |
| 1989 | Designing Women | Belva McPherson | Episode: "The Proxy Pig and Great Pretenders" |
| 1991 | Matlock | Amy Boggs | Episode: "The Parents" |
| 1992 | The Commish | Laura Daley | Episode: "Skeletons" |

== Theatre ==
- Our Town (1998) - Mrs Gibbs
- Noises Off (2014)
- Full Circle (2020)
- Ripcord (2021)
