= Little Women (1978 miniseries) =

American television miniseries

- Genre: Drama; Family; Historical; Romance
- Based on: Little Women by Louisa May Alcott
- Written by: Suzanne Clauser
- Directed by: David Lowell Rich
- Starring: Meredith Baxter Birney; Susan Dey; Ann Dusenberry; Eve Plumb; Dorothy McGuire; Greer Garson; Robert Young
- Music by: Elmer Bernstein
- Country of origin: United States
- Original language: English
- No. of seasons: 1 (regular series)
- No. of episodes: 2 (miniseries); 6 (regular series; 2 unaired in the US)

Production
- Producer: David Victor
- Production locations: Colonial Street, Backlot, Universal Studios - 100 Universal City Plaza, Universal City, California
- Cinematography: Joseph Biroc
- Editors: Jim Benson; Donald Douglas
- Running time: 200 minutes (miniseries); 46-60 minutes (regular series)
- Production companies: Groverton Productions; Universal Television

Original release
- Network: NBC
- Release: October 2 – October 3, 1978
- Release: February 8 – March 8, 1979

Related
- Little Women (1994 film)

Little Women is a 1978 American television miniseries directed by David Lowell Rich and written by Suzanne Clauser based on the 1868–69 two-volume novel of the same name by Louisa May Alcott. The cast includes Susan Dey, Meredith Baxter Birney, Ann Dusenberry, Eve Plumb, Dorothy McGuire, William Schallert, Greer Garson, Robert Young, Richard Gilliland, William Shatner and John de Lancie.

The three-hour miniseries was produced by Universal Television and originally aired in two parts on NBC on October 2–3, 1978.

A brief follow-up series aired from February 8 to March 8, 1979. Unlike the miniseries, it featured original storylines not based on Louisa May Alcott’s novels and included a partial cast change. Eve Plumb was among the cast members who returned (although her character Beth had died in the miniseries, as she had in the original book), playing a cousin of the family named Lissa. Six episodes were produced, but the series was cancelled after only four had been broadcast in the US. Nevertheless, the complete series was exported internationally, including to Australia and Italy.

== Plot ==
The miniseries chronicles the lives and loves of the four March sisters – Jo (Susan Dey), Meg (Meredith Baxter Birney), Amy (Ann Dusenberry) and Beth (Eve Plumb) – growing up in Concord, Massachusetts during the American Civil War. While their father leaves for battle, the sisters must rely on each other for strength in the face of tragedies both large and small.

=== Part One ===
In this particular adaptation, Jo works as narrator opening the story upon Christmas of 1861 in Concord, Massachusetts. She lives with three other sisters, their mother (Marmee), and their housemaid. She identifies them: Meg (16) is a governess, Jo (15) is an aspiring writer and hot-tempered, Beth (13) is timid and sweet and fond of playing the piano, while Amy (12) is the youngest with a predilection for art. Their father is fighting with the Union placing the Marches in a less well-off living situation than they had been in previously.

Meg and Jo are meant to take Amy to school, bemoaning school, she wishes she could stay home like Beth, who is homeschooled due to her severe social anxiety. As she takes her time, Jo starts a snowball fight with Meg, but the snowball misses and strikes the Lawrence's window catching Laurie's attention and embarrassing ever proper Meg.

This adaptation works more to establish the relationship between Mr. Lawrence and his grandson, Laurie and their conflict. Laurie is playing their piano, much to the disapproval of his grandfather as it reminds him of Laurie's parents and the loss of his daughter. Laurie, who is a hermit of sorts, is told he should be out engaging with his peers.

Mr. Lawrence runs into Beth at the post office. She reminds him of his dead daughter who also loved to play piano, he remarks that he can hear Beth's playing from outside the March residence and offers to let her use his own piano as it is nicer and in tune. Later, she takes him up on his offer, but when she starts playing Mr. Lawrence mistakes her playing for Laurie's and comes out admonishing who he thinks is his grandson for playing during his tutoring session. Timid Beth is horrified and absconds, regretting his rashness he then gifts her a nice piano as an apology.

Meg and Jo arrive at Sally Gardner's party, a rich, albeit snobby childhood friend of theirs. Meg yearns for nice things like the other girls feeling out of place in the same dress she wore to Sally's party the year prior. Pitying her, her rich friends give her a makeover. Meanwhile, trying to follow Meg's advice on proper etiquette, Jo stands apart from the party, trying to keep the back of her dress out of sight as it is scorched. Trying to keep herself hidden, she maneuvers herself into a back room and backs into Laurie, who like her is also something of a wallflower. This is their first real meeting and they bond over what marks them each as Peculiar, they end up dancing together but out of sight because of Jo's marred dress. Later, champagne-drunk, Meg twists her ankle in her high heels, and Laurie offers to take the March sisters home.

Amy's teacher strikes her hands with a ruler at school, prompting Marmee to pull her out for homeschooling. Excited, she goes and tells Jo, ecstatic that they can now do their own respective art together...but Jo doesn't like to share her workspace. Dismissively, with unwarranted harshness, she rejects Amy. To add insult to injury, when she and Meg go out with Laurie to the theater, Jo snappily tells Amy she isn't allowed to come. Upset at being excluded and dismissed as a child, Amy lashes out and burns Jo's writings. Jo finds out and swears never to forgive her, ignoring Marmee's lesson on anger and forgiveness she proceeds to give Amy the cold-shoulder. Days later, Laurie and Jo are to go ice skating, desperately trying to get back in Jo's good graces she runs after them but as they are further down the river when she finally catches up, she doesn't hear Laurie's warning to avoid certain areas where the ice is too thin and she falls through the ice. Feeling awful, after Amy's rescue Jo vows to never lose her temper again.

While submitting her stories to a newspaper, Jo finds Laurie and his grandfather in an argument after he catches him at a Pool Hall. Jo stays with Mr. Lawrence, and he divulges that his rigidness with Laurie is informed by his losing his daughter in the past.

A telegram comes interrupting a nice picnic between the March sisters and Lawrences with news that Mr. March, their father, has taken ill. Mr. Brooke, who is interested in Meg's hand in marriage resolves to accompany Marmee's visit to Washington. Train tickets are expensive, and when Aunt March comes over to provide some money, she makes it sound like she isn't going to help with the costs of travel—frustrated, Jo storms off and sells her hair to help pay for the ticket.

While Marmee is in Washington, Beth falls ill after caring for their neighbor's sick baby, who dies of scarlett fever. As Amy has never had scarlett fever, she is sent against her wishes to quarantine with Aunt March, Laurie promises her to keep her company. Beth's condition worsens, and realizing that Meg and Jo are in over their heads, Laurie telegraphs Marmee. When Marmee returns, their father is in tow, and Beth makes a miraculous recovery. Meanwhile, Mr. Brooke confesses his affections to Meg, who likes him but is unsure if she's ready for marriage. Her decision is solidified when Aunt March derides her for being involved with a poor man and threatens to never help her financially should she need it. Meg stands up to Aunt March, declaring she'd rather be poor and happy than rich and miserable, ultimately choosing to marry for love rather than money.

=== Part Two ===
Once again, Jo's narration starts off the story, this time placing it in Spring 1865. She is ill at ease with the changes going on within her family. Meg is to be married, Amy going off on sojourn to Europe, and Beth is chronically ill and unable to leave home. This adaptation contextualizes the story more than other adaptations, referencing the Civil War, the abolitionist movement, and women's suffrage. Jo tells of attending a speech by Susan B. Anthony and of writing for the Daily Volcano which pays.

Laurie takes Jo on a horse ride, and tries to confess his feelings to an evasive Jo. She turns down his proposal—while she loves him, it's as a friend, and their personalities are too conflicting to form a happy marriage. Mr. Lawrence then finds Laurie angstly playing piano, and invites him to Europe with him to find himself. Meanwhile, Jo tells Marmee of Laurie's proposal, and how she feels with everything around her changing and decides that she needs a change as well. She elects to get to New York as a governess to Ms Kirk's boarding school. As she gets settled in New York, she meets an awkward German professor named Friedrich Bhaer who tutors the children at the boarding school. She submits stories to the New York Weelkly Volcano, albeit with their moralizing themes omitted.

Meg and Sally Moffat are out shopping, and Meg, self-conscience in face of her friend's wealth, impulsively buy fifty dollars' worth of silk for a nice dress. This stretches her and her husband's budget, who had been hoping for a new overcoat to replace his current one which is falling apart. He gracefully forgoes the new coat for Meg's silk. Feeling guilty, Meg sells the silk back to Sally and buys her husband his long-awaited overcoat.

Amy is in Italy and is very popular amongst her peers and sought after by men. She has matured greatly. She sees Mr. Lawrence and is thrilled as it means Laurie must be nearby. She tells of a potential suitor, Fred Vaughn, who would enable her to live well-off. Later, Laurie visits her apartment at an ungodly hour, drunk off his rocker. Amy isn't amused, and tells him to stop sulking over Jo and get his act together. That he's throwing his potential away. Shaken, but in a good way, Laurie resolves to shape up and to meet up with Amy in Nice, France in the Spring.

Jo and Professor Bhaer become closer. In exchange for her mending his socks he tries to teach her German...she isn't good at it, but they still go for walks. He shows interest in her writing and would like to read it—yet as he says that, he spots a Weekly Volcano paper in the trash and calls it bottom-of-the-barrel garbage, unaware that Jo writes for the same paper. Feeling sheepish, Jo quietly intercepts any new Weekly Volcano papers lest he see that she writes for them and resolves to discontinue her submissions. He sees it anyway, appalled, he harshly criticizes her and she lashes back saying he probably didn't even read her story.

Later, Jo receives news that Meg is expecting a child and sets out for Concord, Massachusetts. Before she leaves, Bhaer apologizes for his harshness and after reading what she wrote he sees its promise. They say farewell and agree to see each other again sometime soon. Meg has twins.

News reaches Amy that Beth has fallen ill again, yet she insists Amy need not cut her trip short on account of her. Beth knows she's not long for this world but Jo is in denial. She takes her to the beach in hopes that the fresh air will improve her health. Beth asks that Jo accept her upcoming death so that they could cherish the time they have left together. Unlike other adaptations, Beth's death is never shown. Instead, the beach scene is followed by Marmee in all black, she tends to Beth's piano as carefully as one would care for a departed loved one's body. Gently, she closes the lid over the keys as though she were closing a coffin. Still, Jo struggles with acceptance, and Marmee suggests that she write about it. She does that and her story about Beth is accepted.

Meanwhile, Amy and Laurie reunite after receiving news of Beth's death. Laurie tells of his ventures in Vienna and reveals the moment it dawned upon him that he loves Amy. She reciprocates, and they are married. Amy and Laurie return to Concord, Massachusetts to tell the news. Laurie tells Jo first, and she is happy to have her friend back.

Through narration, Jo tells of her newfound popularity as an authoress—and of a loneliness that has settled around her. Letters from Professor Bhaer become infrequent and she misses him. Meanwhile, back in New York Bhaer receives news of a teaching position offered to him at some university in Ohio. Immediately, he sets out to Massachusetts to tell Jo the good news, now that he has a better paying job he could provide for her and he plans on proposing. They run into each other at the train station, and upon receiving news of his new job and ability to take a wife, Jo is stricken—misunderstanding his intention, she struggles not to cry as she believes he is telling her that he is getting married and is saying goodbye. But then Bhaer proposes in a more direct way, and Jo tearfully accepts. She takes him home to meet her family and to share the news of their engagement. The miniseries ends as it started, on Christmas with the Marches all together. Happy.

== Cast ==
=== The March Family (miniseries) ===
- Susan Dey as Josephine 'Jo' March
- Meredith Baxter Birney as Meg March
- Eve Plumb as Elizabeth 'Beth' March
- Ann Dusenberry as Amy March
- Dorothy McGuire as Marmee March
- William Schallert as Jonathan March
- Greer Garson as Aunt Kathryn March

=== The March Family (regular series) ===
- Jessica Harper as Josephine 'Jo' March
- Susan Walden as Meg March
- Ann Dusenberry as Amy March Laurence
- Dorothy McGuire as Marmee March
- William Schallert as Jonathan March
- Mildred Natwick as Aunt Kathryn March

=== The Laurence Family ===
- Robert Young as Grandpa James Laurence
- Richard Gilliland as Theodore 'Laurie' Laurence

=== Miscellaneous (miniseries) ===
- William Shatner as Professor Friedrich Bhaer
- Cliff Potts as John Brooke
- Virginia Gregg as Hannah
- Joyce Bulifant as Mrs. Kirke
- John de Lancie as Frank Vaughn
- Carlene Watkins as Sally Gardiner

=== Miscellaneous (regular series) ===
- David Ackroyd as Professor Friedrich Bhaer
- Cliff Potts as John Brooke
- Virginia Gregg as Hannah
- Eve Plumb as Melissa Jane 'Lissa' Driscoll

== Episodes ==
=== Miniseries ===
No.	Title	Directed by	Written by	Original release date
1	"Part 1"	David Lowell Rich	Suzanne Clauser	2 October 1978
2	"Part 2"	David Lowell Rich	Suzanne Clauser	3 October 1978

=== Regular series ===
No.	Title	Directed by	Written by	Original release date
1	"A Little Box of Haunts"	Leo Penn	Unknown	8 February 1979
2	"If You Can't Forget, Forgive a Little"	Gordon Hessler	Suzanne Clauser	15 February 1979
3	"Anniversary"	John Newland	Unknown	22 February 1979
4	"Winter Solace"	Philip Leacock	Peggy Chantler Dick	8 March 1979
5	"Offerings"	Nicholas Colasanto	David Seidler & Jacqui Feather	Unaired
6	"So Deadly Fair"	Leo Penn	N/A	Unaired

== Awards ==
Winner:

- 1979 – Emmy Award for Outstanding Art Direction for a Series (Howard E. Johnson and Richard C. Goddard)

Nominations:

- 1979 – Emmy Award for Outstanding Cinematography for a Series
- 1979 - Golden Globe Award for Best Television Film

== Home media ==
Little Women was released on a 2-disc DVD in region 1 by Koch Vision on October 9, 2007. On August 14, 2012, Entertainment One (eOne) released the miniseries on a single disc DVD.
