= Stonestreet: Who Killed the Centerfold Model? =

- Genre: Mystery; Crime; Drama
- Written by: Leslie Stevens
- Directed by: Russ Mayberry
- Starring: Barbara Eden; Joseph Mascolo; Joan Hackett; Richard Basehart; Louise Latham; Elaine Giftos; Ann Dusenberry
- Music by: Patrick Williams
- Country of origin: United States
- Original language: English

Production
- Executive producer: David J. O'Connell
- Producer: Leslie Stevens
- Production location: Los Angeles
- Cinematography: Terry K. Meade
- Editor: Robert F. Shugrue
- Running time: 73 minutes
- Production company: Universal Television

Original release
- Network: NBC
- Release: January 16, 1977

Stonestreet: Who Killed the Centerfold Model? is a 1977 American made-for-television mystery-crime drama film starring Barbara Eden, directed by Russ Mayberry from a teleplay written by Leslie Stevens and produced as a pilot for a proposed television series that was not picked up by the network. The film originally premiered as the NBC Movie of the Week on January 16, 1977.

== Plot summary ==
Liz Stonestreet (Barbara Eden) is a private investigator and former policewoman whose late husband, a police detective, was killed in the line of duty and she becomes a detective to keep his beliefs about law and order alive.

Stonestreet is hired by Mrs. Shroeder (Louise Latham) to locate her son, Eddie (James Ingersoli), a small-time hoodlum who has been missing for eight days. Liz goes undercover as an usher at a porno theatre where Eddie worked and discovers in his locker a pair of expensive diamond earrings and newspaper clippings about a missing heiress, Amory Osborn (Ann Dusenberry), the niece of Elliott Osborn (Richard Basehart), a rich and powerful business leader. Despite advice from her boss Max Pierce (Joseph Mascolo) that her suspicions are unfounded, Stonestreet pursues the investigation in an attempt to find the link between Shroeder and the heiress.

== Cast ==
- Barbara Eden as Liz Stonestreet
- Joseph Mascolo as Max Pierce
- Joan Hackett as Jessica Hilliard
- Richard Basehart as Elliott Osborn
- Louise Latham as Mrs. Shroeder
- Elaine Giftos as Arlene
- Ann Dusenberry as Amory Osborn
- James Ingersoll as Eddie Shroeder
- Robert Burton as Dale Anderson

== Release ==
The film aired on NBC on January 16, 1977. Stonestreet: Who Killed the Centerfold Model? has never been released on any home video format in the United States, but has been released on DVD in region 4.
