= The Possessed (1977 film) =

1977 television film directed by Jerry Thorpe

- Home video artwork
- Written by: John Sacret Young
- Directed by: Jerry Thorpe
- Starring: James Farentino; Claudette Nevins; Eugene Roche; Harrison Ford; Ann Dusenberry; Diana Scarwid; Joan Hackett
- Music by: Leonard Rosenman
- Composer: Leonard Rosenman
- Country of origin: United States
- Original language: English

Production
- Executive producer: Jerry Thorpe
- Producer: Philip Mandelker
- Cinematography: Chuck Arnold
- Editor: Michael A. Hoey
- Running time: 74 minutes
- Production company: Warner Bros. Television

Original release
- Network: NBC
- Release: May 1, 1977

The Possessed is a 1977 American supernatural horror television film directed by Jerry Thorpe, written by John Sacret Young, and starring James Farentino, Claudette Nevins, Eugene Roche, Harrison Ford, Ann Dusenberry, Diana Scarwid, Joan Hackett, P. J. Soles, and Dinah Manoff. The film follows a former priest, now an exorcist, who battles Satanic forces that are threatening the students at an Oregon girls' high school.

Produced by Warner Bros. Television, The Possessed was conceived as a television pilot for an exorcism-themed horror series. The film was shot on location in Portland, Oregon in January 1977, mainly on the campus of Reed College. It was first telecast on NBC on May 1, 1977. It received largely negative reviews from critics at the time of its release, though it has attained some retrospective praise from genre critics.

== Plot ==
Kevin Leahy, an alcoholic Catholic priest who has lost his faith, crashes his car and is pronounced dead at the scene. As penance, he is sent back to Earth to fight evil as an exorcist and returns to life. At the Helen Page School, a Catholic girls college in Salem, Oregon, graduation season is near. The school is about to go co-ed. Ellen Sumner is a teacher at the school, which her daughter Louise, who her friends call Weezie, attends. One evening, the paper in Ellen's typewriter inexplicably bursts into flames.

The next night students Lane, Alex, Celia and Marty play a prank on Weezie by smearing ketchup and other foods under her bedsheets. Louise Gelson, Ellen's sister and headmistress of the college, enters and instructs the girls to leave. Weezie returns to her dorm in time to see the curtains suddenly burst into flames. She tells Ms. Gelson, who insists that the girls must have been smoking.

During graduation practice, Lane's gown bursts into flames. Ellen and Paul Winjam, the biology teacher, put out the flames but Lane is burned in the ordeal. Police Sergeant Taplinger is assigned to investigate the incident and Ellen tells him of the other random fires for which she has no explanation. Ellen seeks outside help and is referred to Leahy but her contact admits that he is currently unable to locate him. Soon after, Leahy appears at the school and investigates the occurrences. He and Ellen visit Lane in hospital, where she is receiving treatment for burns to her legs.

Weezie confesses to Leahy that the night of the fire in her dorm, she had visited Mr. Winjam to study for a biology test; he suspects that they may be romantically involved. That night in the biology room, Weezie and Mr. Winjam meet and kiss before his jacket bursts into flames; Weezie is locked out of the room and watches, horrified, through the window as he burns to death.

The next day Leahy finds Ms. Gelson crying hysterically in Winjam's office and realizes she and Winjam had also been romantically involved. Ms. Gelson suspends classes and several students leave the college. That night, Weezie encounters Ms. Gelson wandering erratically through the hallways of the school; Ms. Gelson screams and slaps her. Weezie tells Leahy of the incident and then confesses to her mother about the affair with Winjam. Leahy searches the school for Ms. Gelson and Ellen and Weezie begin to smell smoke.

The remaining girls on campus, who have congregated in one of the dormitories, also begin to smell smoke and find themselves locked in. Ms. Gelson unlocks the rooms and leads them away. Leahy searches the dormitory and finds all the rooms empty. He frees Ellen and Weezie from Ellen's locked office and they attempt to leave the school.

They encounter the possessed Ms. Gelson at the college's swimming pool, surrounded by the girls. Ellen leads all the girls away from the pool area and Ms. Gelson grabs Leahy, setting his jacket on fire, but the fire extinguishes itself. Ms. Gelson, laughing wildly, then spits nails at Leahy. He embraces her and again catches fire; he jumps into the swimming pool, the surface of the water catches fire and he suddenly disappears in a burst of flame.

The college is reopened for graduation and Taplinger asks Ellen about Leahy's identity and whereabouts. She tells him she does not know who he really was or where he went. Lane is able to return to school for the graduation ceremony, overseen by a now healthy Ms. Gelson.

== Cast ==
- James Farentino as Kevin Leahy
- Joan Hackett as Louise Gelson
- Harrison Ford as Paul Winjam
- Claudette Nevins as Ellen Sumner
- P. J. Soles as Marty
- Diana Scarwid as Lane
- Eugene Roche as Sergeant Taplinger
- Ann Dusenberry as Louise "Weezie" Summer
- Dinah Manoff as Celia
- Carol Jones as Alex
- Ethelinn Block as Barry
- Susan Walden as student

== Production ==
The Possessed was conceived as a television pilot episode by NBC for a planned horror series focused around exorcisms.

Principal photography of The Possessed began in early January 1977 in Portland, Oregon, mainly on the campus of Reed College. Additional scenes were filmed at the Holladay Park Hospital. The production reportedly accrued $400,000 in local revenue for the state of Oregon. Filming was completed by February 1977.

== Release ==
The Possessed was first broadcast on NBC on May 1, 1977. The film aired only three weeks before the release of Star Wars (1977), which significantly elevated actor Harrison Ford's public profile.

=== Home media ===
The Warner Archive Collection released The Possessed on DVD on March 23, 2009.

== Reception ==
Critical response to The Possessed was largely unfavorable at the time of its release. Bill Mandel of The San Francisco Examiner panned the film, referring to the script as "nearly incomprehensible... the evil most evident in this turkey was in the producers' minds." Francis Murphy of The Oregonian gave the film a middling review, praising the special effects and acting as "first-rate," but ultimately summarizing: "The Possessed was a disappointing television movie, mainly because the plot lacked motivation."

Steve Barton of Dread Central rated it 3.5/5 stars and called it a "token TV movie Exorcist knock-off" that is "actually ridiculously entertaining." Paul Mavis of DVD Talk rated it 4/5 stars and called it an "extremely effective made-for-TV supernatural horror film."

In a retrospective on the film for Bloody Disgusting, Mike Holtz compared the film favorably against The Exorcist (1973), writing: "Movies still rip off The Exorcist to this day, but rarely are they able to match even the atmosphere of the film. The Possessed manages to pull that off. It also asks a very original question: What if the evil of possession is real but the Church actually has no answer for it? No bible passages or Holy Water. No weapons whatsoever."

Writing for Collider, Mike Holtz gave a favorable assessment of the film, noting: "The Possessed is a particularly competent and grounded film, maybe a little stodgy. It's anchored by its up-and-coming cast, which includes not just one future Oscar nominee in Ford, but three."

== Sources ==
- Deal, David (2015). Television Fright Films of the 1970s. Jefferson, North Carolina: McFarland. ISBN 978-0-786-45514-0.
- Terrace, Vincent (2013). Encyclopedia of Television Pilots, 1937-2012. Jefferson, North Carolina: McFarland. p. 235. ISBN 978-0-786-47445-5.
