= Elvis and the Beauty Queen =

- Genre: Drama; Musical
- Written by: Julia Cameron
- Directed by: Gus Trikonis
- Starring: Don Johnson; Stephanie Zimbalist; Ann Dusenberry; Rick Lenz
- Music by: Allyn Ferguson
- Country of origin: United States
- Original language: English

Production
- Executive producer: David Gerber
- Producer: Charles B. Fitzsimmons
- Production location: Los Angeles
- Cinematography: Thomas Del Ruth
- Editor: Fred A. Chulack
- Running time: 100 minutes
- Production companies: David Gerber Productions; Columbia Pictures Television

Original release
- Network: NBC
- Release: March 1, 1981

Elvis and the Beauty Queen is a 1981 American made-for-television drama musical film starring Don Johnson and Stephanie Zimbalist. It aired on NBC on March 1, 1981, at 9:00 pm.

== Plot ==
Don Johnson stars as Elvis Presley in this made-for-TV true story about Elvis's love affair with Linda Thompson (Stephanie Zimbalist), a young beauty pageant contestant who was his live-in girlfriend and traveling companion for four of the last five years of his life. The story begins with their first meeting, and traces their years together when Thompson tried to keep Presley off drugs in the last years of his career.

== Cast ==
- Stephanie Zimbalist as Linda Thompson
- Don Johnson as Elvis Presley
- Ann Dusenberry as Jeannie
- Rick Lenz as David Briggs
- Ann Wedgeworth as Aunt Betty
- Jay W. MacIntosh as Mrs. Thompson
- Ruta Lee as Su-Su
- Edward Edwards as Sam Thompson
- John Crawford as Vernon Presley
- Darrell Fetty as Pete Moore
- Richard Winterstein as Bobby Farr
- Gary Lee Davis as Ray
- John Ashton as Jake
- Bobbi Jordan as Pregnant Woman
- Hanala Sagal as Woman Kissed by Elvis during his concert

== Production ==
Seven songs were recorded for the soundtrack in Nashville, Tennessee, with country singer Ronnie McDowell providing the vocals. The band who backed McDowell was the Glass Hammer, a Nashville-based band. The Glass Hammer consisted of Joe Meador, guitar, Don Lee, lead guitar, Bill Conn, keyboards and horns, Larry Leath, bass, and Rick Judkins, drums.

== Reception ==
A People reviewer said, "Don Johnson is praiseworthy as the King, but did Elvis really lounge around in tight leather pants and metal-studded capes?"

The Chicago Tribune, reviewing the movie after Johnson became famous for Miami Vice, said, "Every time Don Johnson delivers a line, you find yourself rolling onto the floor as you howl with laughter."
