= The Mystery Chef =

American TV cooking series (1949)

- Genre: Cooking
- Presented by: John MacPherson
- Country of origin: United States
- Original language: English

Production
- Running time: 30 minutes

Original release
- Network: NBC

The Mystery Chef is an American cooking show that aired on NBC from March 1, 1949 to June 29, 1949. It was one of NBC's first daytime programs.

Host John MacPherson prepared recipes on the show, which was broadcast from 3 to 3:15 p.m. Eastern Time on Tuesdays and Thursdays.

The Mystery Chef was an adaptation of the radio program of the same name. It "encouraged women to take a break from their daytime soaps to develop sophisticated but manageable meals".
