= Stefan Schaefer =

American film writer and director (born 1971)

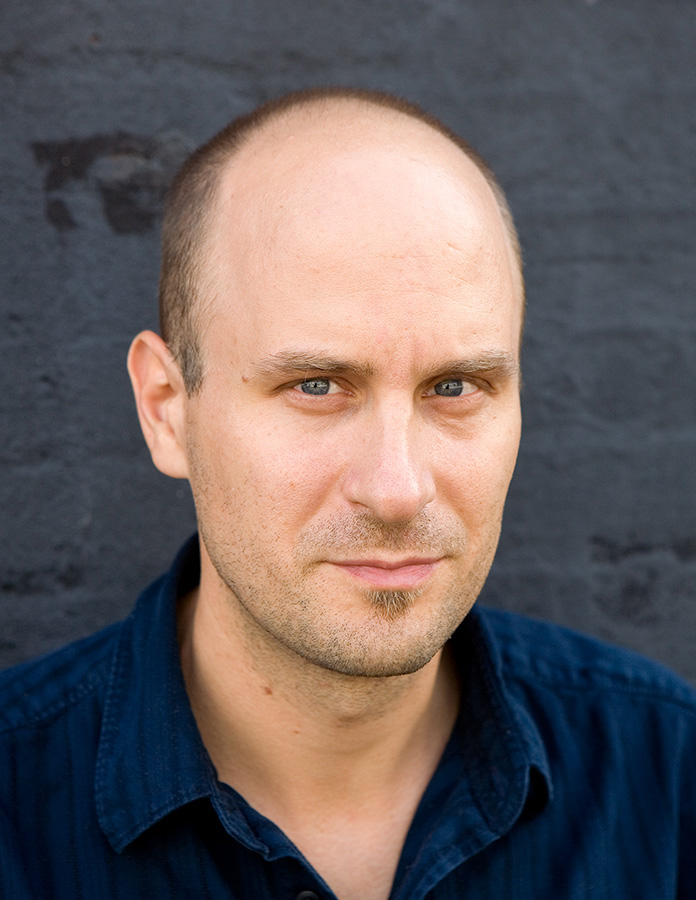
- Schaefer in 2015
- Born: August 17, 1971 (age 55); Cambridge, Massachusetts, U.S.
- Education: Wesleyan University (BA); Kiel University (Fulbright Scholar)
- Occupations: Writer; director; producer
- Spouse: Chenta Laury
- Children: 2

Stefan Schaefer (born August 17, 1971) is an American film director, screenwriter and producer. He works as a screenwriter and director for films that have been screened at festivals such as South by Southwest.

== Biography ==
=== Early life and education ===
Schaefer was born in Cambridge, Massachusetts. He was raised in Sussex during his early childhood, and later lived in both Michigan and New York. He studied theatre and political theory at Wesleyan University and graduated Phi Beta Kappa. After completing his undergraduate studies, he spent a year and a half in Germany as a Fulbright scholar at Kiel University. After returning to New York City, he co-founded the production company Cicala Filmworks.

He is the maternal grandson of Carl R. Eklund, a polar explorer and ornithologist.

== Career ==
Schaefer's 2007 film Arranged was screened at festivals such as South by Southwest (SXSW). His work has been made available on Netflix, Amazon Prime, Hulu, HBO, PBS, and Sundance Channel.

With writer Chris Silber, Schaefer has co-written television films for the European networks ARD and ZDF, including two productions filmed in Hawaii.

Schaefer directed the documentary, Contested Streets, which compared the use of public space and streets in New York City with London, Paris, and Copenhagen. The film was shown at environmental film festivals and aired on Sundance TV as part of The Green series. He also directed a documentary on W.S. Merwin, Even Though the Whole World Is Burning.

== Filmography ==
Film
Year	Title	Credit	Notes
2005	Confess	Director/writer	
2006	Act Normal	Co-producer	Documentary
2006	Contested Streets	Director/Producer/Editor	Documentary
2007	Arranged	Director/Writer/Producer	
2008	The Higher Force	Writer/Producer/Actor	Comedy
2008	The Amazing Truth About Queen Raquela	Writer/Producer/Actor	Drama film
2009	The Hungry Ghosts	Producer/Actor	Drama film
2011	The Roundup	Director/Writer/Producer	Short film
2011	Get a Job	Producer/Actor	
2011	My Last Day Without You	Director/Writer/Producer	
2014	Even Though the Whole World Is Burning	Director/Writer/Producer	Documentary
2017	Kuleana	Producer/Actor	
2020	Aloha Surf Hotel	Director/Writer/Producer	
2023	Viral	Director/Co-writer/Producer	Short film
2024	Grit & Gratitude: The Sig Anderman Story	Director/Writer/Producer	Documentary

Television
Year	Title	Credit
2009	Circledrawers	Co-creator/producer/actor
2012	First Lady / Nicht mit mir, Liebling	Writer
2013	The Paradise Within / Das Paradies in uns	Writer
2013	To Love, Let Go / Wer liebt, lässt los	Writer
2015	Bluewater: Nightmare in Paradise / Blauwasserleben	Writer
2016	Surf Break Hotel	Director/Writer/Producer
2016	W.S. Merwin: To Plant a Tree	Director/Writer/Producer
2018	I Am Because You Are	Director/Writer/Producer

== Awards and nominations ==
- 2002 – New York Foundation for the Arts Fellowship in Screenwriting
- 2003 – Berlin Talents, Berlin International Film Festival
- 2004 – Grand Prize in Digital Filmmaking from Apple and Panasonic
- 2005 – Scribe Prize Hamptons International Film Festival, Confess
- 2007 – Berkshire International Film Festival: Audience Award Arranged
- 2007 – Brooklyn Film Festival: Best Film, Best Narrative Feature Film, Arranged
- 2008 – Skip City International Film Festival: Grand Prize, $100,000 award for Best Film Arranged
- 2012 – Black Reel Awards: Best Original Song My Last Day Without You (nominated)
- 2018 – Writer-in-Residence, Can Cab Literary Residence
- 2020 – Hawaii International Film Festival: Made-in Hawaii Best Feature Aloha Surf Hotel (nominated)
- 2021 – Hawaii Film Critics Society: Best Hawaii Feature Film Aloha Surf Hotel (nominated)
- 2022 – Individual Artist Grant from the National Endowment for the Arts and the Hawaii State Foundation on Culture and the Arts
- 2024 – Hawaii Film Critics Society: Best Hawaii Feature Film One Million Dolla (nominated)
