= Jeff Doucette =

American actor (born 1947)

- Born: Jeffrey Doucette; November 25, 1947 (age 78); Milwaukee, Wisconsin, U.S.
- Occupation: Actor
- Years active: 1977–present
- Spouse(s): Kathleen Kelley (m. 1988; div. 1999) Saba Moor (m. 2003)
- Children: 1

Jeffrey Doucette (born November 25, 1947) is an American actor, comedian, and director. Doucette toured for years with Ernst Emling as the comedy duo Jeff and Ernst. Doucette has appeared in over 90 films and television shows and written two plays. He has also been a voice artist in many television commercials and cartoon and portrayed Benjamin Franklin in ads for numerous brands.

== Early life ==
Born in Milwaukee, Wisconsin, he was the second of eight children born to Elizabeth "Betty" (née Andres) and William "Bill" Doucette.

Doucette graduated from Marquette University High School in the mid-1960s. After high school, he attended Lewis University in Romeoville, Illinois, where he became the first Theater Major at the university. After his undergraduate studies, Doucette enrolled in the graduate school at Northern Illinois University, seeking an additional theater degree.

== Career ==
In 1974, Doucette moved to Chicago, joining The Second City improv theater. During his time at Second City, Doucette met his future comedy partner, Ernst Emling, and formed the comedy duo Jeff and Ernst. Under the guidance of improv teacher Del Close, the pair were quickly signed by the William Morris Agency and began to tour the U.S. with folk singer Bob Gibson, eventually opening in larger venues for acts including Barry Manilow and The Spinners.

In 1976, Doucette and Emling moved to Los Angeles, joining the ranks of a burgeoning group of young comics, including Freddie Prinze, Jay Leno, David Letterman, Richard Lewis, Robin Williams, Michael Keaton, Jim Varney, and Andy Kaufman. After many appearances on variety and talk shows, the pair made their first appearance on The Tonight Show Starring Johnny Carson in 1977.

To date, Doucette has appeared in over 92 films and television series, including Splash, All The Way, The Dentist 2, Desperate Housewives, Weird Science, Newhart, Alien Nation, Townies, Dog With A Blog, 3rd Rock from the Sun, ER, That '70s Show and Beverly Hills 90210. He has been a voice artist in many television commercials and cartoons.

Doucette was the main antagonist in the Bollywood film Hisss and appeared in the Disney World attraction Cranium Command.

In television commercials, Doucette has portrayed Benjamin Franklin in ads for Chevrolet Volt: Quicken Loans; Ballpark's Finest Hot Dogs; and El Monterrey breakfast foods. He also made a special appearance as Franklin on Mike & Molly.

Doucette is also a writer and director, having written two plays: Big Head Women, a science-fiction comedy; and Without Annette, an improvisational comedy written with actress and writer Hope Juber and published by Playscripts, Inc. in 2015.

In 1991, Doucette received the Los Angeles Drama Critics Circle Award for Best Lead Performance for "Rage, or I'll Be Home For Christmas" at the Alliance Theater in Burbank. In 2014, he received the Lifetime Achievement Award from the International Student Film Festival Hollywood (ISFFH).

== Personal life ==
Doucette and his wife, Saba, are licensed spiritual practitioners in the United Centers for Spiritual Living; they are active as teachers, counselors and teen and 'tween group leaders. His Life Play seminars and workshops focus on improvisation as a path for spiritual and self-discovery.

== Filmography ==
=== Live action roles ===
==== Film ====
Year	Title	Role	Notes
1978	The Comedy Company	Red	
1978	Fairy Tales	Jack	
1983	Love Letters	Hippy	
1984	Splash	Junior	
1986	The Best of Times	Olin	
1988	Portrait of a White Marriage	Darryl Spencer	
1988	Two Idiots in Hollywood	Taylor Dup	
1990	Syngenor	David Greenwait	
1992	Mom and Dad Save the World	Captain Destroyer	
1994	Lies of the Heart: The Story of Laurie Kellogg	Ed Francis	
1994	Midnight Runaround	Orvis	
1994	Someone She Knows	Deputy Olsen	
1994	Across the Moon	Mean Guard	
1995	Zero Tolerance	Cop	
1996	Access Denied	Sheriff	
1997	The Rage	Dr. Arnold	
1998	The Dentist 2	Jeremy Wilkes	
1998	Babylon 5: The River of Souls	2nd Man	
2000	Bedazzled	Desk Sergeant	
2002	The Mangler 2	Janitor Bob	
2003	Harold Buttleman, Daredevil Stuntman	Wally	
2005	Little Athens	Mr. Carson	
2006	Karla	Burroughs' Partner	
2008	Parasomnia	Detective Conroy	
2010	Hiss	George States	
2013	Diamond on Vinyl	George	
2013	Somebody Marry Me	Rabbi Greenberg	
2013	Continuing Fred	Vern	
2015	Earthfall	Farmer	
2015	A Kind of Magic	Jason Tate	
2016	All the Way	Senator Jim Eastland	
2019	In Vino	Maurice	

==== Television ====
Year	Title	Role	Notes
1977	Eight Is Enough	Lyle	Episode: "Dark Horse"
1981	Bosom Buddies	Franklyn Royce	Episode: "How Great Thou Art"
1981	One Day at a Time	Waiter, Robert	2 episodes
1981	CHiPs	Vincent	Episode: "Weed Wars"
1984	Falcon Crest	J.C. Fillmore	Episode: "Little Boy Blue"
1984–1988	Newhart	Harley Estin	16 episodes
1984	Domestic Life	Vic Curtis	Episode: "Showdown at Walla Walla"
1984	AfterMASH	Wolfe	Episode: "Ward Is Hell"
1984	The A-Team	Malcolm Jones	Episode: "Breakout!"
1984	Highway to Heaven	Dave Ratchett	Episode: "Another Song for Christmas"
1984	E/R	Ambulance Driver, Bert the Paramedic	6 episodes
1985	Cagney & Lacey	Marshall Waters	Episode: "Who Says It's Fair: Part 2"
1986	Hill Street Blues	Chick Turner	Episode: "Iced Coffey"
1986	Hunter	Vaughn	Episode: "Overnight Sensation"
1987	Sledge Hammer!	Bartender	Episode: "Haven't Gun, Will Travel"
1988	Punky Brewster	Animal Control Officer Nichols	Episode: "Bad Dog"
1988	CBS Summer Playhouse		Episode: "Some Kinda Woman"
1989	Night Court	Dr. Dumont	Episode: "From Snoop to Nuts"
1989–1990	Alien Nation	Burns	14 episodes
1989	It's Garry Shandling's Show	Fred Wozniak	Episode: "SuperGrant"
1990	ALF	Scooter	Episode: "Hungry Like the Wolf"
1990	They Came from Outer Space	Sheriff Meecham	Episode: "The Beauty Contest"
1990–1991	Coach	Floyd, Hal	3 episodes
1991	Harry and the Hendersons	Officer Perth	2 episodes
1991–1992	Empty Nest	Desk Clerk, Sam	2 episodes
1991	The New Adam-12	Jack Lowdan	Episode: "Homeless in America"
1991	Morton & Hayes	Crook	Episode: "Home Buddies"
1992	Davis Rules	Eddie	Episode: "Ferry Tale"
1992	Delta	Deke, Gene	3 episodes
1992	Beverly Hills, 90210	Hudge	3 episodes
1994	The Fresh Prince of Bel-Air	Coach Kelly	Episode: "I Know Why the Caged Bird Screams"
1994	Dream On	Todd	Episode: "Where There's Smoke, You're Fired"
1994	The Adventures of Brisco County, Jr.	Sheriff Hyde	Episode: "Bad Luck Betty"
1994–1997	Weird Science	Al Wallace, Number One, Red Brick Wallace	8 episodes
1994	ER	Mr. Larkowski	Episode: "24 Hours"
1994	Women of the House	Moving Man #1	Episode: "Miss Sugarbaker Goes to Washington"
1995	Party of Five	Repairman	Episode: "Aftershocks"
1995	The 5 Mrs. Buchanans	Truck Stop Waiter	Episode: "Never on the Road Again"
1995	Courthouse		Episode: "Injustice for All"
1995–1996	Unhappily Ever After	Coach	2 episodes
1996	The Home Court	Mr. Sidowski	Episode: "Dog Day Afternoon"
1996	Murphy Brown	George Turner	Episode: "The Bus Stops Here"
1996	Crossroads Café	Mr. Clayborne	Episode: "Winds of Change"
1996	Murphy Brown	George Turner	Episode: "The Bus Stops Here"
1996	Townies	Steve Baker	6 episodes
1997	Beyond Belief: Fact or Fiction	Candlestick: Detective	Episode: "Candlestick"
1997	The Drew Carey Show	The Police Marshall	Episode: "A Very, Very, Very Fine House"
1998	Family Matters	Phil	Episode: "Breaking Up Is Hard to Do"
1998	Sleepwalkers	Detective Burke	Episode: "Counting Sheep"
1998	Caroline in the City	Duane	Episode: "Caroline and the Drycleaner"
1998	3rd Rock from the Sun	Chet	3 episodes
1999–2005	JAG	Senator Jim, Senior Chief Petty Officer Harvey Shenburg	3 episodes
1999–2001	That '70s Show	Dale	3 episodes
2000	Shasta McNasty	Twinkles the Clown	Episode: "Play Dead, Clown"
2000	The District	Landlord	Episode: "Surveillance"
2000	Yes, Dear	Gino	Episode: "Greg's Big Day"
2001	Kate Brasher	Jerry Kramer	2 episodes
2001	Family Law	Mr. Linden	Episode: "Clemency"
2001	The Tick	Bus Driver	Episode: "Pilot"
2002	That '80s Show	Gus	Episode: "My Dead Friend"
2004–2010	Desperate Housewives	Father Crowley	10 episodes
2005	Carnivàle	Bill McKechnie	Episode: "Lincoln Highway, UT"
2005–2019	Grey's Anatomy	Warren Sterman	2 episodes
2005	Cold Case	Larry Papas 2005	Episode: "Creatures of the Night"
2005	Malcolm in the Middle	Nate	Episode: "Burning Man"
2005	Invasion	Bob Hemming	Episode: "The Dredge"
2006	Crossing Jordan	Mr. Nicholson	Episode: "Thin Ice"
2007	Criminal Minds	Coroner	Episode: "Jones"
2007	Entourage	Jeff Doucette	Episode: "Malibooty"
2009	Castle	Super	Episode: "When the Bough Breaks"
2009	Dollhouse	Store Manager	Episode: "Meet Jane Doe"
2010	Better Off Ted	Mr. Krebs	Episode: "Change We Can't Believe In"
2010	Sons of Tucson	Homeless Man	Episode: "The Debate Trip"
2011	Zeke and Luther	Harrison Gilroy	Episode: "Bro'd Trip"
2012	Fred: The Show	Bert	Episode: "A Visit from Grandma"
2012	Good Luck Charlie	Mr. Willard	Episode: "Baby's First Vacation"
2012	Weeds	Cop	Episode: "Only Judy Can Judge"
2012–2015	Dog with a Blog	Phil Trummer	3 episodes
2013	Scandal	Warden	Episode: "Truth or Consequences"
2013	Shameless	Uncle Matt	2 episodes
2013	Franklin & Bash	DA Harrison Gingold	Episode: "Good Lovin'"
2013	Masters of Sex	Mr. Langshaw	Episode: "Involuntary"
2014	Lab Rats	Bank Rep	Episode: "No Going Back"
2014	Glee	NY Times Critic	Episode: "Opening Night"
2014	Kickin' It	Old Fisherman	2 episodes
2014	Anger Management	Louie	Episode: "Charlie and the Epic Relationship Fail"
2015	Mike & Molly	Ben Franklin	Episode: "Hack to the Future"
2015	Grace and Frankie	Homer	Episode: "The Funeral"
2015	True Detective	Jeweler	Episode: "Other Lives"
2015	Documentary Now!	Gordo	Episode: "Gentle and Soft: The Story of the Blue Jean Committee Part 1"
2015	How to Get Away with Murder	George Danvers	Episode: "It's Called the Octopus"
2016	Girl Meets World	Mr. Norton	2 episodes
2017	Colony	John Schultz	Episode: "Free Radicals"
2017	I'm Dying Up Here	Tom	Episode: "My Rifle, My Pony and Me"
2018	Driven	Teddy	Episode: "Part 1"
2019	I'm Dying Up Here	Leonard Gilmartin	Episode: "The Pillars of Creation"
2019	Dealbreakers	Joe	Episode: "Cowboy Joe"
2021	Gaslit	Senator Sam Ervin	2 episodes
2022	American Horror Stories	TBA	Episode: "Necro"

=== Voice roles ===
==== Film ====
Year	Title	Role	Notes
1998	Dr. Dolittle	Possum	
2016	The Wild Life	Mal, Pango	
2017	The Son of Bigfoot	Fat Dan, Tim, Tech Support Operator	Direct-to-DVD

Television

Year	Title	Role	Notes
1998	Cow and Chicken	Fat Farmer, Goat	Episode: "I Am Vampire"
2000	God, the Devil and Bob	Smeck	13 episodes
2002	The Zeta Project	Sheriff	Episode: "Ro's Gift"
2006	Ben 10	Thumbskull	2 episodes
2008	My Life as a Teenage Robot	Glenn Wakeman	Episode: "Never Say Uncle"
2008	Random! Cartoons	Ivan the Unbearable, Olaf	Episode: "Ivan the Unbearable"

Video games

Year	Title	Role	Notes
2001	Metal Gear Solid 2: Sons of Liberty	SEALs	
