= Mr. Sunshine (2011 TV series) =

American sitcom

- Genre: Sitcom
- Created by: Matthew Perry; Marc Firek; Alex Barnow
- Starring: Matthew Perry; Allison Janney; Andrea Anders; James Lesure; Nate Torrence
- Composer: Rob Cairns
- Country of origin: United States
- Original language: English
- No. of seasons: 1
- No. of episodes: 13 (4 unaired)

Production
- Executive producers: Jamie Tarses; Thomas Schlamme; Matthew Perry; Alex Barnow; Marc Firek
- Producers: Annette Sahakian Davis; Bryan Adams; John Amodeo (pilot only)
- Editors: Rick Blue; Gregg Featherman; Rob Seidenglanz (pilot only)
- Camera setup: Single-camera
- Running time: 22 minutes
- Production companies: Anhedonia Productions; Barnow and Firek Productions; FanFare Productions; Shoe Money Productions; Sony Pictures Television

Original release
- Network: ABC
- Release: February 9 – April 6, 2011

Mr. Sunshine is an American television sitcom that aired from February 9 to April 6, 2011, as a mid-season replacement. The single-camera comedy was co-created by Matthew Perry, who also starred in the series. ABC cancelled the series on May 13, 2011, due to low ratings.

== Premise ==
Ben Donovan (Perry) is the operations manager for the Sunshine Center, a second-tier arena in San Diego, who has to deal with the unusual demands of his job and his unpredictable boss (Allison Janney).

== Cast and characters ==
=== Main cast ===
- Matthew Perry as Ben Donovan – manager of the Sunshine Center
- Allison Janney as Crystal Cohen – Ben's unpredictable boss
- Andrea Anders as Alice – Ben's former "friend with benefits" now dating Alonzo
- James Lesure as Alonzo Pope – former NBA star, Ben's happy-go-lucky co-worker and Alice's boyfriend
- Nate Torrence as Roman Cohen – Crystal's lovable but weird son. He has a crush on Heather

=== Recurring cast ===
- Portia Doubleday as Heather – Ben's assistant, whom everyone believes is crazy

== Development and production ==
Mr. Sunshine is based on a concept by Matthew Perry, who planned to co-write, star in, and executive produce. The project sparked a bidding war among the networks, with ABC landing the comedy in October 2009. The deal came with hefty penalties for ABC if the pilot hadn't made it to series. Perry teamed with Sony writers Alex Barnow and Marc Firek to pen the script.

A green light to produce the pilot came from ABC in early January 2010. Thomas Schlamme, of Shoe Money Productions, was chosen to direct the half-hour pilot. Perry, Schlamme, and co-writers Barnow and Firek were all listed as executive producers for the pilot, along with Jamie Tarses of FanFare Productions.

Casting began in late January, with Allison Janney as the first actor added to the cast as Ben's boss. In February, Andrea Anders was tapped as Ben's "friend with benefits", and Nate Torrence brought on board to play Roman, the son of Ben's boss. The casting of Portia Doubleday as Ben's assistant, and James Lesure as an ex-basketball star, was announced at the end of April.

In May 2010, ABC picked up the pilot for the 2010–2011 television season.

On May 13, 2011, ABC announced that it had canceled Mr. Sunshine.

== Episodes ==
No.	Title	Directed by	Written by	Original release date	U.S. viewers (millions)
1	"Pilot"	Thomas Schlamme	Matthew Perry & Marc Firek & Alex Barnow	February 9, 2011	10.52
We are introduced to Ben Donovan, manager of the Sunshine Center arena. Ben tries to get rid of a hockey rink when the ice won't melt in time for the circus. He also finds out that an elephant is loose in the building. Alice, Ben's "friend with benefits", decides to end their fling, saying she wants to be in a committed relationship. She then tells him she's seeing Alonzo, Ben's best friend and that she is moving in with him because he is everything she looks for in a guy. Ben meets his new assistant Heather, who might be crazy. Crystal, Ben's boss wants him to hire her son Roman, who she is not close to, and kind of an oddball. All this on Ben's 40th birthday.
2	"Employee of the Year"	Beth McCarthy-Miller	Marc Firek & Alex Barnow	February 16, 2011	6.93
Crystal announces that there will be a contest to determine who is the employee of the year, and the winner gets a golf cart. Everyone begins to go crazy, doing everything it takes to impress Crystal. After agreeing not to get too competitive over the contest, Alice and Alonzo sabotage each other's plans to impress Crystal. Although Crystal told Ben he is the winner, he soon finds out that Crystal is giving the golf cart to Roman so she can get closer to him. Meanwhile, Ben caters to a teen pop star (Nick Jonas) planning to perform at the arena.
3	"Heather's Sister"	Randall Einhorn	Sally Bradford	February 23, 2011	6.12
Heather tricks Ben into going on a date with her sister Stephanie, but Ben realizes that her sister is crazy. In order to help Roman ask Heather out, he goes on a double date with them and Stephanie. Alice tries to impress her best friend who is coming to visit and wants to introduce her to Alonzo, who is walking Crystal's dog in a dog show.
4	"Hostile Workplace"	Bryan Gordon	Eric Gilliland	March 2, 2011	6.87
Ben's plan to get his employees to like him backfires. Meanwhile, Crystal invites Alice and Alonzo on a double date with her new beau, and Ben gives Heather the responsibility of finding a new halftime act when the Sunshine Center mascot suddenly quits.
5	"Crystal on Ice"	Beth McCarthy-Miller	Matthew Carlson	March 9, 2011	4.76
Ben discovers Roman has no place to stay and reluctantly takes him in, Crystal harbors animosity for a certain ice dancing group, and Alice feels guilty when she fails to keep up with her "perfect man."
6	"Lingerie Football"	Randall Einhorn	Matthew Carlson	March 16, 2011	4.54
When Ben discovers its Crystal's anniversary with Billy, one of her ex-husbands, he encourages her to find him so she can get the closure she's needed from their relationship. While he helps Crystal, Ben looks to Roman to entertain his date -- the hot quarterback of a woman's lingerie football team -- and Alice lends Alonzo a hand with two unruly, internet billionaires.
7	"Celebrity Tennis"	Barnet Kellman	Bryan Adams	March 23, 2011	5.79
It's a dream come true for Ben when he teams with Alonzo to play doubles against tennis legend Jimmy Connors and actor Fred Savage in a celebrity tennis tournament. Meanwhile, Ben feels the need to reveal to Alonzo his past with Alice, and a careless act on Crystal's part brings her closer to son, Roman.
8	"The Assistant"	Elliot Hegarty	Casey Johnson & David Windsor	March 30, 2011	4.02
When Alice asks Ben for an assistant, he gives her Roman. Roman may not be what Alice had in mind, but she finds a connection with him that surpasses her expectations. Meanwhile, Crystal wants to honor a passing friend with a funeral at The Sunshine Center, and Alonzo comes clean about a past relationship.
9	"Ben and Vivian"	Bryan Gordon	Eric Gilliland	April 6, 2011	4.66
Ben is in for a surprise when his one-night stand turns out to be Crystal's new assistant, Vivian. When Ben and Vivian try to continue their "no strings attached" relationship, Ben discovers something about himself. Meanwhile, Crystal's efforts to be a responsible mom to Roman are derailed, and the mascot sends Alonzo over the edge.
10	"Self Help"	Barnet Kellman	Sally Bradford	Unaired	N/A
When the self-help guru scheduled for a seminar at the arena is arrested for fraud, the staff struggles to find a replacement act. Heather's obsession with Ben grows, which inflames Roman's jealousy. Alice's fear of public speaking returns.
11	"Family Business"	Fred Savage	Casey Johnson & David Windsor	Unaired	N/A
Ben's hockey idol is coming to visit the arena and Ben must convince him of their organization's family values in order to land him as coach of their hockey team. Crystal is distraught when her pet dog dies and everyone is walking on eggshells. Alonzo gets a chance to film a commercial but Alice is more excited than he is.
12	"Cohen and Donovan"	Jamie Babbit	Matthew Carlson	Unaired	N/A
The arena hosts a leadership conference with 3 charismatic leaders that turn out to be self-absorbed jerks. Crystal decides she needs to contribute to the arena's operation, much to Ben's dismay.
13	"The Best Man"	Tristram Shapeero	Matthew Perry & Marc Firek & Alex Barnow	Unaired	N/A
The arena puts on a wedding for two valued employees. Roman and Heather have their first fight. Ben struggles with the age difference with his girlfriend.

== Home media ==
The series was released on DVD on November 1, 2011, featuring the 4 unaired episodes.

== Reception ==
On Rotten Tomatoes, the series has an aggregate score of 52% based on 14 positive and 13 negative critic reviews. The website’s consensus reads: "Thanks to the willing slapstick antics of a solid ensemble cast, Mr. Sunshine has potential -- although for what, it's difficult to tell." The show scored a 54% rating on Metacritic.
