= Aloha Surf Hotel =

- Directed by: Stefan Schaefer
- Written by: Stefan Schaefer
- Story by: Stefan Schaefer; Jonathan Stern
- Produced by: Keith Quinn; Branscombe Richmond; Stefan Schaefer; Jonathan Stern
- Starring: Augie Tulba; Taiana Tully
- Cinematography: Dan Hersey
- Edited by: Adi Ell-Ad
- Production companies: Cicala Filmworks, Abominable Pictures
- Release date: November 5, 2020 (United States)
- Running time: 95 minutes
- Country: United States
- Language: English
- Box office: $33,562

Aloha Surf Hotel is a 2020 American independent film written and directed by Stefan Schaefer, and produced by Cicala Filmworks and Jonathan Stern's Abominable Pictures. The film premiered at the 2020 Hawaii International Film Festival, and was released to theatres in Hawaii on December 4, 2020.

== Plot ==
The film centers on a former pro who is forced to take a surfing instructor job at a beachfront hotel. He takes on a variety of jobs at the business while attempting to save the family-run, Hawaiian-owned hotel from a takeover attempt.

== Cast ==
- Augie Tulba as Tai
- Taiana Tully as Kaila
- Branscombe Richmond as Mr. Kahele
- Daniella Monet as Babymooner
- Alex Farnham as Shiv
- Shawn Mokuhahi Garnett as Moe
- Kealani Warner as Alana
- Matt Corboy as Doug
- Cyris Laury-Schaefer as Ethan
- Talei Laury-Schaefer as Maya
- Kai Lenny as himself

== Release and reception ==
The film premiered at the 2020 Hawaii International Film Festival, where it was nominated for Best Made In Hawaii Feature Film.

It opened theatrically in Hawai'i in December 2020, and played in Regal, Consolidated and several independent theaters in Hawai'i through June, 2021 — outperforming many studio films.

It was nominated as 2021 "Best Hawaiian Film" by the Hawai'i Film Critics Society.
