= Polite People =

2011 film

- Film poster
- Directed by: Olaf de Fleur Johannesson
- Written by: Olaf de Fleur Johannesson; Hrafnkell Stefansson
- Starring: Stefán Karl Stefánsson
- Cinematography: Bjarni Felix Bjarnason
- Music by: Wojciech Golczewski
- Release date: 31 March 2011
- Running time: 90 minutes
- Country: Iceland
- Language: Icelandic

Polite People (Icelandic: Kurteist fólk) is a 2011 Icelandic comedy film directed by Olaf de Fleur Johannesson.

== Cast ==
- Stefán Karl Stefánsson as Lárus Skjaldarson
- Ágústa Eva Erlendsdóttir as Margrét
- Hilmir Snær Guðnason as Hrafnkell
- Eggert Þorleifsson as Markell
- Ragnhildur Steinunn Jónsdóttir as Hanna
- Halldóra Geirharðsdóttir as Elín
- Benedikt Erlingsson as Þorgeir
- Gunnar Hansson as Jónatan
- Ingvar Eggert Sigurðsson as Þorsteinn
- Friðrik Friðriksson as Danskur ljósmyndari
- Jóhann G. Jóhannsson as Askur

== Plot ==
Lárus is an engineer. His dying father asks him to revive the slaughterhouse in a small town. He is estranged from his mother and his wife is having an affair with his boss, so he leaves his city job and drives off to the country town. Unfortunately, he struggles to gain support for the project amongst the locals. His daughter comes to stay with him and Lárus begins dating her schoolteacher. Her old boyfriend, Hrafnkell the dairy manager is jealous and tells the schoolteacher he will leave his wife. The slaughterhouse of the nearby town is upset about having competition and persuade the bank manager to expose financial fraud from the mayor Markell. When questioned by the police, the mayor invokes his influence with a member of parliament trying to stall them. The father of Lárus dies, and at the funeral he tells his mother to stay away from his children. Markell is sacked from the council. Hrafnkell sees his chance to become mayor and stays with his wife. Markell prompts Lárus to also run for mayor in the election. Markell and Lárus have a scheme to buy abandoned farms as a tourism project. At the candidate's debate, he finds the member of parliament has betrayed them and given the idea to Hrafnkell. Hrafnkell becomes the mayor, but his wife catches him committing adultery. Markell is released from prison after a few months and has another plan for the slaughterhouse.
