= The Amazing Truth About Queen Raquela =

2008 film by Olaf de Fleur

- Theatrical release poster
- Directed by: Olaf de Fleur Johannesson
- Written by: Olaf de Fleur Johannesson; Benedikt Jóhannesson
- Produced by: Arleen Cuevas; Olaf de Fleur Johannesson; Stefan C. Schaefer; Helgi Sverrisson
- Cinematography: Rune Kippervik; Butch Maddul; Ragnar Santos
- Edited by: Benedikt Jóhannesson; Olaf de Fleur Johannesson; Dagur Kári
- Music by: Pavel E. Smid
- Distributed by: Poppoli Pictures
- Release date: 10 February 2008 (Berlin International Film Festival)
- Running time: 90 minutes (orig.); 80 minutes
- Countries: Iceland; Philippines; France; Thailand
- Languages: Icelandic; Visayan; English; Thai
- Budget: $400,000 (estimated)

The Amazing Truth About Queen Raquela is a 2008 drama film directed by Olaf de Fleur Johannesson.

== Premise ==
Raquela, a Filipino transsexual prostitute, dreams of making a new life in Paris. She becomes an Internet porn star and meets Valerie, an Icelandic transsexual, and Michael, the owner of the website she works for.

== Cast ==
- Raquela Rios as Herself
- Stefan Schaefer as Ardilo, Michael
- Olivia Galudo as Olivia
- Brax Villa as Aubrey
- Valerie Grand Einarsson as Valerie Einarsson

== Distribution and reception ==
The film showed at the 2008 Berlin International Film Festival where it won the Teddy Award for Best Feature Film. It has been screened in the Emerging Visions section of the 2008 South by Southwest festival in the United States.

It received the Grand Jury Prize in the 10th 2008 Cinemanila International Film Festival at Malacañan Palace's Kalayaan Hall.
