= Even Though the Whole World Is Burning =

2014 film by Stefan Schaefer

- Film poster
- Directed by: Stefan Schaefer
- Produced by: Stefan Schaefer
- Starring: W. S. Merwin
- Release date: June 8, 2014 (Maui Film Festival)
- Country: United States

Even Though the Whole World Is Burning is a feature documentary film about former United States Poet Laureate and environmental activist W. S. Merwin. The film is directed and produced by Stefan Schaefer, and screened at the Maui Film Festival, DOXA Documentary Film Festival, Environmental Film Festival in the Nation's Capital, Seattle International Film Festival, and the Hawaii International Film Festival.

== Production ==
W.S. Merwin: To Plant a Tree is a one-hour documentary edited from Even Though the Whole World Is Burning, produced by Cicala Filmworks and WNET, and directed by Stefan Schaefer, specifically for national broadcast on PBS. It screened widely at film festivals.
