= Bad Attitudes =

- Brazilian VHS cover
- Written by: Caleb Carr
- Directed by: Alan Myerson
- Starring: Ellen Blain; Ralph Bruneau; Carlease Burke; Maryedith Burrell; Eugene Byrd
- Music by: Peter Rodgers Melnick
- Country of origin: United States
- Original language: English

Production
- Producer: James A. Dennett
- Cinematography: Jacek Laskus
- Editor: Gary Karr
- Running time: 88 minutes
- Production company: FNM Films

Original release
- Network: Fox Network
- Release: September 11, 1991

Bad Attitudes is a 1991 television film written by Caleb Carr and directed by Alan Myerson. The film was originally aired by Fox Network on September 11, 1991. The film centers around two hijackers who take over a plane. However, the airplane is not carrying a billionaire as planned and is instead carrying a group of clever but delinquent children.

== Plot ==
The film opens at Spirit of the Frontier, a summer camp for children with attitude problems. Friends Dabney and Cosmo participate in hikes, obstacle courses and chores all while antagonizing their counselor Bruce. At the end of the summer the boys are proud that their attitudes actually got worse until they realize they will have to return again next year.

The next summer Dabney and Cosmo are reunited at the airport where they meet three other campers and a counselor, with whom they are unimpressed. Nearby the wealthy Norman Decker is walking his pet doberman through the terminal and is met by Mr. Bane who delivers him a briefcase. Russian criminals Katyana and Jurgen observe the pair and discuss their intention to kidnap Decker and hold him for one billion dollars ransom. Decker and Bane board Decker’s private jet and stash the briefcase and doberman on board before leaving.

While preparing to board their own flight Jenny, one of the campers, pays the counselor to get lost while James, another camper, reveals that Bruce was also sent to escort them but James tied him up and left him in a cleaning closet. The fifth camper is Angela who is up for anything, always wears headphones and rarely speaks. Now enthusiastic about their cohorts, Dabney and Cosmo join the gang as they are chased around the tarmac by security before escaping onto Decker’s plane. Meanwhile Katyana and Jurgen, thinking that Decker is on the jet, board the aircraft to kidnap him. Caught in the process, they exchange gunfire with the police as they seal the door. Although the hijackers can’t find Decker aboard the plane they think they have discovered his children and make their demand for one billion dollars ransom over the radio. Cosmo reveals his dad’s pilot sometimes lets him fly and while attempting to taxi around the airport he inadvertently takes off.

The children’s parents and counselors are notified of the ongoing hostage crisis. Humorously, the adults assume the large police response is mainly to control their children and believe that the hijackers must be in over their heads. The parents are shown to be mostly wealthy, self-absorbed and generally lacking in concern for the welfare of their children. On board the kids take charge through a series of pranks and exploitation of the power dynamic between the hijackers— Katyana is dominant and Jurgen enjoys being disciplined by her. Jurgen, however, becomes self-conscious about the lack of respect he receives from Katyana after being teased by the children. Eventually the kids are able to subdue the hijackers, steal their weapons and tie them up using the aircraft’s flotation devices. Angela, who has located and bonded with the doberman, has the dog stand guard. The children then decide to fly to Brazil to start a new life.

Interspersed with this are scenes of Bane and Decker having covert conversations in the airport while wearing a series of disguises. It turns out that Decker is broke and hired Bane to build a bomb so he could blow up his plane and collect insurance money. Now that the children are at risk Bane eventually loses his nerve and turns himself in to the police who arrest him and Decker.

The children are contacted by the police with instructions on how to defuse the bomb. It turns out that only the timer and detonator are in the brief case and James has to bungee jump out of the emergency exit to physically detach the bomb from the landing gear while in flight. With the bomb crisis averted, the gang soon learns that Cosmo doesn’t know how to land the plane. Exhausted by their ordeal the children decide they are ready to return home. They contact air traffic control and are given instructions which allow Cosmo to successfully land the plane. The children fear that they will be in big trouble for their antics so they release Katyana and Jurgen in an attempt to show that the hijackers were the ones in control the whole time. However, the hijackers race to surrender to law enforcement to get away from the kids. Once they are safely off the plane the children find that they are actually hailed as heroes and happily reconcile with their families.

== Cast ==
- Jack Evans as Dabney Mitchell/Narrator
- Ethan Embry as Cosmo Coningsby
- Ellen Blain as Jenny
- Eugene Byrd as James
- Meghann Haldeman as Angela
- Ralph Bruneau as Tim Mitchell
- Carlease Burke as Security Guard
- Maryedith Burrell as Katyana
- Richard Gilliland as Jurgen
- Tony Longo as Bruce Ryan
- Maggie Roswell as Angela's Mother
