= Africa United (2005 film) =

2005 film by Olaf de Fleur

- Directed by: Ólaf de Fleur Jóhannesson
- Written by: Ólaf de Fleur Jóhannesson
- Produced by: Ólaf de Fleur Jóhannesson; Benedikt Jóhannesson; Eva Maria Funch; Ragnar Santos
- Starring: Einar Xavier Sveinsson; Saint Paul Edeh; Zakaria Anbari
- Distributed by: Poppoli Pictures
- Release dates: July 2005 (Karlovy Vary); 21 October 2005
- Running time: 80 minutes
- Country: Iceland
- Languages: English, Icelandic
- Budget: $320,000
- Box office: $235,000

Africa United is a 2005 Icelandic documentary film directed by Ólaf de Fleur Jóhannesson. The original musical score is by Barði Jóhannsson. The film explores the life of Zakaria Anbari who moves to Iceland from Morocco in search of fortune. The film premiered at the 2005 Karlovy Vary International Film Festival.

It won the Documentary of the Year at the 2005 Edda Awards. It also received nominations for Director of the Year and Script of the Year at the 2005 Edda Awards.

Africa United was filmed in Iceland, England, Morocco and Serbia.

== Plot ==
Zakaria Anbari (Zico) has been playing football all his life. He came to Iceland from Morocco to seek his fortune. He starts his own business but it fails to take off after ten years, and Zico goes bankrupt and unable to find work. Left desperate and depressed, Zico decides to start an amateur football team, Africa United, and take them into the semi-professional third division. Initially, Africa United is asked to play in the out-of-division category by the Icelandic Football Association, but they were accepted into the third division after ten years. Zico calls upon immigrants from all-over Iceland, players from Morocco, Nigeria, Colombia, Serbia, Kosovo, Gambia and Guinea to form the team, Africa United. The players migrated to Iceland for various reasons, such as escaping war or to find employment.

The team starts out by looking for sponsors to support them. They faced multiple rejections from companies, and their final hope is with Vodafone. The team creates a mock-up of an advertisement as a sponsorship pitch to Vodafone, which impresses the management and finally secures a sponsorship for Africa United.

The team encounters many setbacks throughout the season. By mid-season, the team has lost all their games thus far. Furthermore, the team constantly has strong arguments with each other, causing one of their best players, Zlatko (Zlatko Krickic) to leave the team and return home to Serbia to get married. Faced with the multiple setbacks, Zico decides to head to England to seek the advice from the Charlton Athletic Football Club manager, Alan Curbishley. With the advice from Alan, Zico comes back to Iceland with new ideas of leading the team and approaching his life goals.

The team is finally able to cooperate with one another, and Zlatko is persuaded by Zico to return to the team. After much trials and tribulations, the team finally achieves their first win in their last game of the season.
