= W. S. Merwin =

American poet (1927–2019)

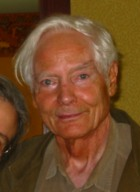
- Merwin in 2003
- Born: William Stanley Merwin; September 30, 1927; New York City, U.S.
- Died: March 15, 2019 (aged 91); Haiku, Hawaii, U.S.
- Education: Princeton University (BA)
- Occupation: Poet
- Spouse(s): Dorothy Jeanne Ferry; Dido Milroy; Paula Dunaway (1983–2017)
- Writing career
- Period: 1952–2019
- Genres: Poetry, prose, translation
- Notable awards: See below

United States Poet Laureate
- In office 2010–2011
- Preceded by: Kay Ryan
- Succeeded by: Philip Levine

William Stanley Merwin (September 30, 1927 – March 15, 2019) was an American poet who wrote more than fifty books of poetry and prose and produced many works in translation. During the 1960s anti-war movement, Merwin's unique craft was thematically characterized by indirect, unpunctuated narration. In the 1980s and 1990s, his writing influence derived from an interest in Buddhist philosophy and deep ecology. Residing in a rural part of Maui, Hawaii, he wrote prolifically and was dedicated to the restoration of the island's rainforests.

Merwin received many honors, including the Pulitzer Prize for Poetry in 1971 and 2009; the National Book Award for Poetry in 2005, and the Tanning Prize — one of the highest honors bestowed by the Academy of American Poets — as well as the Golden Wreath of the Struga Poetry Evenings. In 2010, the Library of Congress named him the 17th United States Poet Laureate. Alongside co-author Takako Lento, he received the Japan–U.S. Friendship Commission Prize for the Translation of Japanese Literature in 2013 for their translation of Collected Haiku of Yosa Buson.

== Early life ==
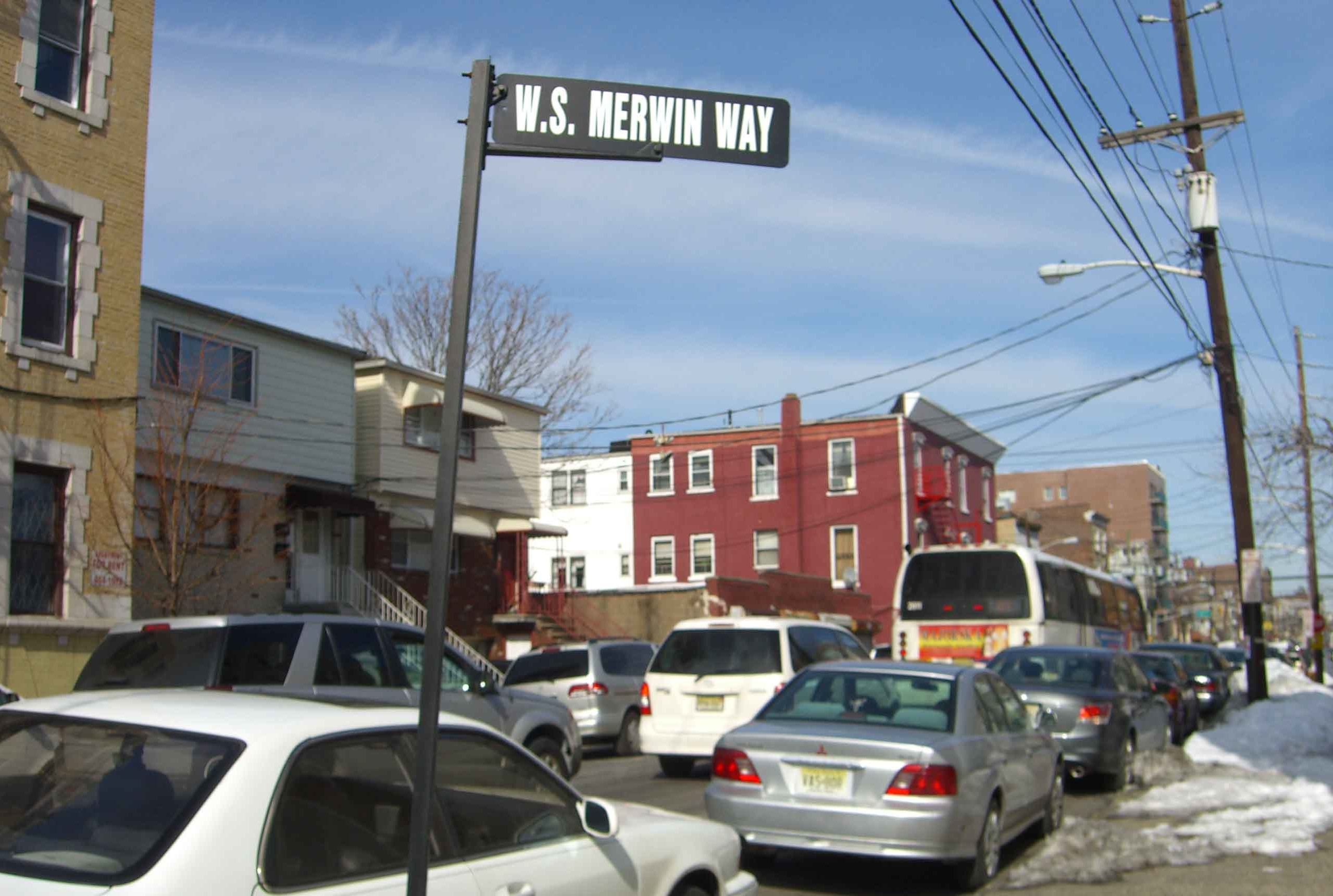
Merwin grew up on this street in Union City, New Jersey, which was renamed for him in 2006.

W. S. Merwin was born in New York City on September 30, 1927. He grew up on the corner of Fourth Street and New York Avenue in Union City, New Jersey, and lived there until 1936, when his family moved to Scranton, Pennsylvania. As a child, Merwin was enamored of the natural world, sometimes finding himself talking to the large tree in his back yard. He was also fascinated with things that he saw as links to the past, such as the building behind his home that had once been a barn which housed a horse and carriage. At the age of five he started writing hymns for his father, a Presbyterian minister.

== Career ==
=== Early career: 1952–1976 ===
Merwin graduated from Princeton University with a B.A. in English in 1948, where he studied with R.P. Blackmur and befriended Blackmur's graduate assistant, the poet John Berryman. He stayed at Princeton a year afterward to do graduate work. In 1952, Merwin married Dorothy Jeanne Ferry, and moved to Spain. During his stay there, while visiting the renowned poet Robert Graves at his homestead on the island of Mallorca, he served as tutor to Graves's son. There, he met Dido Milroy, fifteen years his senior, with whom he collaborated on a play and whom he later married and lived with in London. In 1956, Merwin moved to Boston for a fellowship at the Poets' Theater. He returned to London, where he befriended Sylvia Plath and Ted Hughes. In 1968, Merwin moved to New York City, separating from his wife Dido Milroy, who stayed at their home in France. In the late 1970s, Merwin moved to Hawaii and eventually was divorced from Dido Milroy. He married Paula Dunaway in 1983.

From 1956 to 1957, Merwin was also playwright-in-residence at the Poet's Theatre in Cambridge, Massachusetts; he became poetry editor at The Nation in 1962. Besides being a prolific poet, he was a respected translator of Spanish, French, Latin and Italian literature and poetry (including Lazarillo de Tormes and Dante's Purgatorio) as well as poetry from Sanskrit, Yiddish, Middle English, Japanese and Quechua. He served as selector of poems of the American poet Craig Arnold (1967–2009).

Merwin is known for his poetry about the Vietnam War and can be included among the canon of Vietnam War-era poets which includes writers Robert Bly, Robert Duncan, Adrienne Rich, Denise Levertov, Robert Lowell, Allen Ginsberg and Yusef Komunyakaa.

Merwin's early subjects were frequently tied to mythological or legendary themes, while many of his poems featured animals. A volume called The Drunk in the Furnace (1960) marked a change for Merwin, in that he began to write in a more autobiographical way.

In the 1960s, Merwin lived in a small apartment in New York City's Greenwich Village.

=== Later career: 1977–2019 ===
Merwin's volume Migration: New and Selected Poems won the 2005 National Book Award for poetry.

In 1998, Merwin wrote Folding Cliffs: A Narrative, an ambitious novel-in-verse about Hawaiʻi in history and legend.

The Shadow of Sirius, published in 2008 by Copper Canyon Press, was awarded the 2009 Pulitzer Prize for poetry.

In June 2010, the Library of Congress named Merwin the seventeenth United States Poet Laureate, to replace the outgoing Kay Ryan. He is the subject of the 2014 feature documentary film Even Though the Whole World Is Burning, directed by Stefan Schaefer. A one-hour version, entitled "To Plant a Tree", was broadcast nationally on PBS. Merwin appeared in the PBS documentary The Buddha, released in 2010. He had moved to Hawaii to study with the Zen Buddhist master Robert Aitken in 1976.

In 2010, with his wife Paula, he co-founded The Merwin Conservancy, a nonprofit organization dedicated to preserving his hand-built, off-the-grid poet's home and 18-acre restored property in Haiku, Maui, which has been transformed from an "agricultural wasteland" to a "Noah's Ark" for rare palm trees, one of the largest and most biodiverse collections of palms in the world.

Merwin's last book of poetry, Garden Time (Copper Canyon Press, 2016), was composed during the difficult process of losing his eyesight. When he could no longer see well enough to write, he dictated poems to his wife, Paula. It is a book about aging and the practice of living one's life in the present. Writing about Garden Time in The New York Times, Jeff Gordinier suggests that "Merwin's work feels like part of some timeless continuum, a river that stretches all the way back to Han Shan and Li Po."

In 2017, Copper Canyon Press published The Essential W. S. Merwin, a book which traces the seven-decade legacy of Merwin's poetry, with selections ranging from his 1952 debut, A Mask for Janus, to 2016's Garden Time, as well as a selection of translations and lesser-known prose narratives. Merwin's literary papers are held at the Rare Book & Manuscript Library at the University of Illinois at Urbana–Champaign. The collection consists of some 5,500 archival items, and 450 printed books.

== Death ==
Merwin lived on land that was part of a pineapple plantation, on the northeast coast of Maui, Hawaii.

W.S Merwin died on March 15, 2019, in his sleep at his home, as reported by his publisher Copper Canyon Press.

== Awards ==
Scholars Cary Nelson and Ed Folsom have noted that Merwin was as widely recognized as a major talent, even while he was "criticized, prodded, reprimanded and challenged at every stage of his career." Merwin won a number of prestigious awards throughout his writerly life, including:

- 1952: Yale Younger Poets Prize for A Mask for Janus
- 1954: Kenyon Review Fellowship in Poetry
- 1956: Rockefeller Fellowship
- 1957: National Institute of Arts and Letters grant
- 1957: Playwrighting Bursary, Arts Council of Great Britain
- 1961: Rabinowitz Foundation Grant
- 1962: Bess Hokin Prize, Poetry magazine
- 1964/1965: Ford Foundation Grant
- 1966: Chapelbrook Foundation Fellowship
- 1967: Harriet Monroe Memorial Prize, Poetry magazine
- 1969: PEN Translation Prize for Selected Translations 1948–1968
- 1969: Rockefeller Foundation Grant
- 1971: Pulitzer Prize for Poetry for The Carrier of Ladders (published in 1971)
- 1973: Academy of American Poets Fellowship
- 1974: Shelley Memorial Award
- 1979: Bollingen Prize for Poetry, Yale University Library
- 1987: Governor's Award for Literature of the state of Hawaii
- 1990: Maurice English Poetry Award
- 1993: The Tanning Prize for mastery in the art of poetry
- 1993: Lenore Marshall Poetry Prize for Travels
- 1994: Lila Wallace-Reader's Digest Writers' Award
- 1999: Poetry Consultant to the Library of Congress, a jointly held position with Rita Dove and Louise Glück
- 2005: National Book Award for Poetry for Migration: New and Selected Poems
- 2004: Golden Wreath Award of the Struga Poetry Evenings Festival in Macedonia
- 2004: Lannan Lifetime Achievement Award
- 2008: Golden Plate Award, American Academy of Achievement
- 2009: Pulitzer Prize for Poetry for The Shadow of Sirius (published in 2008)
- 2010: Kenyon Review Award for Literary Achievement
- 2010: United States Poet Laureate
- 2013: Zbigniew Herbert International Literary Award

=== Other accolades ===
Merwin's hometown honored him in 2006 by renaming a local street near his childhood home W. S. Merwin Way. His 1988 Selected Poems was included by Harold Bloom in his list of works constituting the Western Canon.

== Sources ==
- The Union City Reporter (March 12, 2006).
