= Eugene Byrd =

American actor

- Byrd in 2026
- Born: Philadelphia, Pennsylvania, U.S.
- Occupation: Actor
- Years active: 1986–present

Eugene Byrd is an American actor. He is best known for his roles as Wink in 8 Mile and Clark Edison on the FOX series Bones.

== Early life ==
Byrd was born in Philadelphia, Pennsylvania. He graduated from Greene Street Friends School in 1989 and The Crefeld School in 1993.

== Career ==
Byrd began acting as a child, appearing as Arthur in the film My Little Girl in 1986. His subsequent film appearances include Dead Man, Demon Island, Sleepers, 8 Mile, Lift and Anacondas: The Hunt for the Blood Orchid. He had the lead role in Confess, for which he won the Break-Out Performance Award at the 2006 Method Fest Independent Film Festival. He also collaborated with longtime friends Will Fuller, Jerry Della Salla and Clay Von Thomas for a film titled The Barracks.

Byrd had a guest spot on the Nickelodeon series Are You Afraid of the Dark?, playing a teenage prankster named Weeds in the episode "The Tale of the Super Specs." He has also made appearances on The Cosby Show, Beverly Hills, 90210 as Robinson Ashe III, Touched by an Angel and its spinoff Promised Land as Lawrence "L.T." Taggert, a troubled teen struggling with gang related drug and violence issues. He starred in the Disney film Perfect Harmony, which explores the racial tensions between African-American and white populations in South Carolina. His character, Landy Allen, is the grandson of an African-American caretaker at an all-white private academy. His character's musical talent attracts the interest of a student named Taylor Bradshaw (played by Justin Whalin), who sets out to explore the music and lives of African-American residents, knowing his actions could result in expulsion from the academy and rejection by his fellow white students and friends.

In 1993, Byrd appeared as Walter Haines on Ghostwriter. He portrayed the comical but defiant Oliver Cross on Chris Cross, which won an award for "Best Children's Series" in 1994. The series aired on the Showtime from 1994 to 1995. He guest starred on NYPD Blue, had a minor role on Heroes and a recurring role as Sidney on Crossing Jordan, which aired on NBC from 2001 to 2007. He has also made appearances on Two and a Half Men and the Syfy series Eureka as Dr. Michael Clark in the episode "Worst Case Scenario." He played a detective on American Horror Story: Asylum.

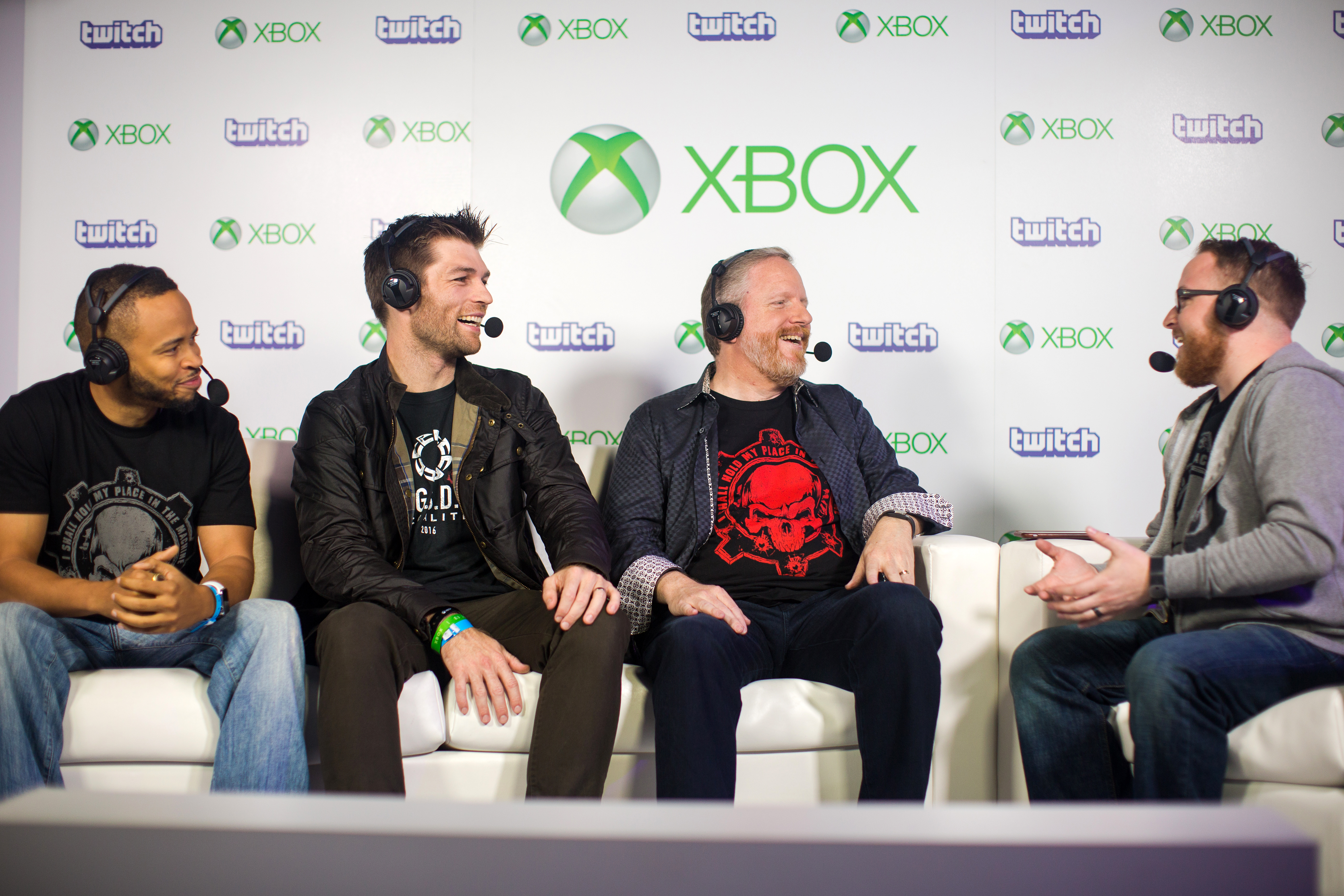
Byrd at E3 2016 with Gears of War 4 actors Rod Fergusson and Liam McIntyre.

Byrd had a recurring role as Clark Edison on Bones. Starting with season eight, his character is hired as a full-time staff forensic anthropologist by Jeffersonian Forensic Division head Dr. Camille Saroyan (played by Tamara Taylor). He was credited as a guest star during his tenure on the show. He also played Andy Diggle on The CW series Arrow.

In 2014, he was hired by video game company Electronic Arts to play Marcus "Boomer" Boone in Battlefield Hardline.

He voiced Delmont "Del" Walker in Gears of War 4 and Gears 5, as well as Zander Freemaker on Lego Star Wars: The Freemaker Adventures in 2016 and 2017.

== Personal life ==
On January 6, 2011, The Glendale News reported that Byrd was arrested in California by the Glendale Police Department for suspicion of domestic assault on January 1, 2011.

== Filmography ==
=== Film ===
Year	Title	Role	Notes
1986	My Little Girl	Arthur	
1995	Dead Man	Johnny "The Kid" Pickett	
1996	Sleepers	Rizzo Robinson	
1996	Twisted	Willus Burns	
1998	The Substitute 2: School's Out	Mase	Direct-to-video
1998	Went to Coney Island on a Mission from God... Be Back by Five	Teenage Friend	
1999	Whiteboyz	Khalid	
2002	8 Mile	Wink	
2004	Paranoia 1.0	Nila	
2004	Anacondas: The Hunt for the Blood Orchid	Cole Burris	
2005	Confess	Terrell Lessor	
2007	Rails & Ties	Otis Higgs	
2007	Light and the Sufferer	Kaz	
2008	Julia	Leon	
2009	Easier with Practice	Aaron	
2010	How to Make Love to a Woman	Layne Wilson	
2017	Kings	Eddie	
2018	A Million Little Pieces	Matty	
2020	Superman: Man of Tomorrow	Ron Troupe (voice)	Direct-to-video
2020	Definition Please	Wayland Pines	
2021	DC Showcase: The Losers	Henry Jones (voice)	Direct-to-video
2022	Rise of the Teenage Mutant Ninja Turtles: The Movie	Security Guard, Police, Office Man #2, Café Man (voice)	Netflix film

=== Television ===
Year	Title	Role	Notes
1988	Monsters	Brad	Episode: "My Zombie Lover"
1989	True Blue	Timmy Powers	Episode: "Pilot: Part 1"
1990	Murder in Mississippi	Ben Jr.	Television film
1991	Law & Order	Tonel Otten	Episode: "Mushrooms"
1991	Big Bird's Birthday or Let Me Eat Cake	Jelani	Television film
1991	Perfect Harmony	Landy Allen	Television film
1991	Bad Attitudes	James	Television film
1991	Beverly Hills, 90210	Robinson "Ronny" Ashe III	Episode: "Ashes to Ashes"
1991	The Young Riders	Quinn Ellis	Episode: "Between Rock Creek and a Hard Place"
1991–92	Sesame Street	Jelani	2 episodes
1991–92	The Cosby Show	Eugene	4 episodes
1992	Are You Afraid of the Dark?	Weeds	Episode: "The Tale of the Super Specs"
1993	Tribeca	Carl Jr.	Episode: "The Rainmaker"
1993	Ghostwriter	Walter Haines	4 episodes
1993	Chris Cross	Oliver Cross	13 episodes
1995	New York Undercover	Tiandre	Episode: "Manchild"
1998–99	Promised Land	Lawrence "L.T." Taggert	16 episodes
1999	The Outer Limits	Ronnie Dell	Episode: "Fathers & Sons"
2000	Law & Order: Special Victims Unit	Carlos Medina	Episode: "The Third Guy"
2000	D.C.	Tyrell	Episode: "Justice"
2000	Enslavement: The True Story of Fanny Kemble	Jack	Television film
2000	Third Watch	Nathaniel "Puppet" Ryder	2 episodes
2001	NYPD Blue	Andre Cutler	Episode: "Franco, My Dear, I Don't Give a Damn"
2001	The Education of Max Bickford	Ryan	Episode: "Who Is Breckenridge Long?"
2002	For Your Love	Uncle Omar	8 episodes
2003	The Lyon's Den	Damon Moss	Episode: "Blood"
2003, 2006	Two and a Half Men	Lenny	2 episodes
2004	ER	James Connor	Episode: "Just a Touch"
2004	Half & Half	Derek	Episode: "The Parent Trap Episode"
2004–05	Crossing Jordan	Sidney	13 episodes
2005	Ghost Whisperer	Derrik Lee	Episode: "Hope and Mercy"
2005–06	Night Stalker	Alex Nyby	4 episodes
2006	Without a Trace	Cole Warren	Episode: "Blood Out"
2006	Robot Chicken	Various voices	2 episodes
2006	Shark	Kurt Bellows	Episode: "Sins of the Mother"
2006–07	Heroes	Campaign Manager	4 episodes
2007–17	Bones	Clark Edison	36 episodes
2008	Life	Ben Mosby	Episode: "Jackpot"
2009	Numbers	Vic Mortiz	Episode: "Sneakerhead"
2009	Raising the Bar	Andre Jackman	Episode: "Trust Me"
2010	Amish Grace	Danny	Television film
2010	The Mentalist	Russell Bigelow	Episode: "Red Letter"
2012	Eureka	Dr. Michael Clark	Episode: "Worst Case Scenario"
2012	Daybreak	Charles	5 episodes
2012	Wilfred	James	2 episodes
2012	American Horror Story: Asylum	Greyson's Partner	Episode: "The Origins of Monstrosity"
2012	Suburgatory	Cyrus	Episode: "Friendship Fish"
2014	True Blood	Jerome	3 episodes
2015–16	Arrow	Andy Diggle	8 episodes
2016–17	Lego Star Wars: The Freemaker Adventures	Zander Freemaker, additional voices	31 episodes
2017	Training Day	Detective Windowski	Episode: "Code of Honor"
2017	Still the King	Courtney Hitch	4 episodes
2018–20	Rise of the Teenage Mutant Ninja Turtles	Jase, Sam, Cortex (voice)	5 episodes
2019	The Rookie	Man in Apartment 101	Episode: "Standoff"
2019	American Dad!	Ship Captain (voice)	Episode: "An Irish Goodbye"
2019	Family Guy	UPS Deliveryman (voice)	Episode: "Bri-Da"
2019	Get Shorty	Jordan Parr	Episode: "Dark Roast, Oat Milk, Two Splendas"
2019	All Rise	Detective Bert Taylor	Episode: "Marciela and the Desert"
2019	It's Pony	Balloonist, Game Voice (voice)	2 episodes
2019–20	The Rocketeer	Mr. Coleman (voice)	2 episodes
2019–20	L.A.'s Finest	Big Mikey	2 episodes
2020	One Day at a Time	Salesman	Episode: "Penny Pinching"
2020	The Loud House	Roger (voice)	Episode: "Senior Moment"
2021–24	All American	Dr. Dameon Spears	4 episodes
2021	Dad Stop Embarrassing Me!	Matt Ross	Episode: "#BlackPeopleDontGoToTherapy"
2021–23	The Ghost and Molly McGee	Principal O'Connor (voice)	6 episodes
2021–23	All American	Dr. Dameon Spears	4 episodes
2021–present	Spidey and His Amazing Friends	Jeff Morales (voice)	16 episodes
2022–24	The Legend of Vox Machina	Captain Jarrett Howarth (voice)	5 episodes
2022	Secrets of Sulphur Springs	Sam Tremont (Adult)	8 episodes
2022	Exception	Oscar (voice)	English dub 8 episodes
2022	Reasonable Doubt	CJ Cooke	4 episodes
2022–23	Secrets of Sulphur Springs	Sam Tremont (Adult), Moss Man	16 episodes
2023	Quantum Leap	Dr. Harper	Episode: "Paging Dr. Song"
2023	Baby Shark's Big Show!	Timothy Toothwell (voice)	Episode: "Splish Splashketball"
2023	Bookie	Himself	Episode: "Always Smell the Money"
2024	9-1-1: Lone Star	Will	Episode: "Kiddos"
2025–present	Your Friendly Neighborhood Spider-Man	Lonnie Lincoln / Tombstone (voice)	10 episodes
2025	Grey's Anatomy	Danny Ford	Episode: "Jump(for My Love)"
2025	Georgie & Mandy's First Marriage	Don	Episode: "McAllister Auto Loves the Ladies"

=== Video games ===
Year	Title	Role
2004	Call of Duty: Finest Hour	Additional voices
2006	Driver: Parallel Lines	Additional voices
2006	Scarface: The World Is Yours	Additional voices
2011	Kinect Sports: Season Two	Basketball Announcer
2015	Battlefield Hardline	Marcus "Boomer" Boone
2016	Gears of War 4	Delmont "Del" Walker
2019	Gears 5	Delmont "Del" Walker
2022	Saints Row	Eli
2025	Avowed	Additional voices
