= Camp Wilder =

American television series

- Genre: Sitcom
- Created by: Matthew Carlson
- Written by: Matthew Carlson; Gary Gilbert; Cheryl Holliday; Matt Miller; Barrie Nedler; David Z. Sacks; Donald Todd
- Directed by: Zane Buzby; Gail Mancuso; Arlene Sanford; David Trainer; James Widdoes
- Starring: Mary Page Keller; Jerry O'Connell; Jay Mohr; Meghann Haldeman; Margaret Langrick; Hilary Swank; Tina Majorino
- Composer: Jonathan M. Wolff
- Country of origin: United States
- Original language: English
- No. of seasons: 1
- No. of episodes: 20 (1 unaired)

Production
- Executive producer: Matthew Carlson
- Producers: Linda Nieber; David Z. Sacks
- Running time: 30 minutes
- Production companies: Vanity Logo Productions; ABC Productions

Original release
- Network: ABC
- Release: September 18, 1992 – February 26, 1993

Camp Wilder is an American television sitcom which aired on ABC from September 18, 1992, until February 26, 1993. The premise centered on a young woman who opens up her home to the friends of her younger siblings, who sought it as judgment-free "hangout", and who regularly went to her for advice. The series was created by Matthew Carlson, and produced by a.k.a. Productions in association with Capital Cities Entertainment.

The show aired as a part of ABC's TGIF lineup, but was cancelled after 19 episodes due to low ratings. A twentieth episode was produced, but was never aired in the United States. Camp Wilder was also shown in the UK, Spain and Germany.

== Synopsis ==
Ricky Wilder (Mary Page Keller) is a 28-year-old nurse and single mother, raising her family in her childhood home after her parents' deaths. Ricky's only actual child was her 6-year-old daughter Sophie (Tina Majorino), but she was also the principal guardian to her teenage siblings, 16-year-old Brody (Jerry O'Connell) and 13-year-old Melissa (Meghann Haldeman). From the time their parents died, Ricky understood that she could not change out of her persona as the "cool, approachable" older sister, and mixed parenting tactics in with the setting of a casual, laissez-faire household. In fact, the atmosphere in the Wilder house was so laid-back that many of Brody and Melissa's friends sought it as a refuge from the stricter, more confining homes run by their traditional parents. Ricky thus welcomed them all in with open arms, and they regularly sat around the family's kitchen table and dished about life's various happenings and dilemmas, while Ricky helped them sort out their issues and dispensed sound advice in a non-judgmental, friend-like way. As a result, the neighborhood youth nicknamed their home "Camp Wilder."

Among the regular inhabitants of Camp Wilder were Brody's off-kilter best friend Dorfman (Jay Mohr) and Melissa's best friends Beth (Margaret Langrick) and Danielle (Hilary Swank). Many other friends and classmates of theirs passed through Camp Wilder in guest appearances, most notably Dexter (Jared Leto), a hip, motorcycle-riding bad boy who Danielle had the hots for. However, it was goofball Dorfman who quickly became the show's breakout character, with his gross-out humor causing friction with the girls, and Ricky's numerous attempts to help him become an upstanding young man (i.e., teaching him work ethic by giving him a job as an orderly at her hospital, saving him from being held back in school by becoming his tutor, etc.). Other stories focused on the escapades of the Wilders, and especially on Sophie, who was beginning to look up to Brody as a surrogate father figure rather than just as an uncle. Throughout the show's 20 episodes, she began exhibiting tomboyish traits, and at Christmas, she told the family that all she wanted was to be a boy.

== Cast ==
=== Main ===
- Mary Page Keller as Ricky Wilder
- Jerry O'Connell as Brody Wilder, Ricky's younger brother
- Jay Mohr as Dorfman, Brody's best friend
- Meghann Haldeman as Melissa Wilder, Ricky's younger sister
- Margaret Langrick as Beth, Melissa's best friend
- Hilary Swank as Danielle, Melissa's other best friend
- Tina Majorino as Sophie Wilder, Ricky's daughter

=== Recurring ===
- Jared Leto as Dexter

== Original pilot ==
When the series was originally conceived, it was titled Camp Bicknell and a pilot was shot under this original title. In the first pilot, which was subsequently retooled, Elena Stiteler had the role of Ricky Bicknell, the older sister who was raising young daughters Lucy (Ginger Orsi) and Sophie (Tina Majorino). Ricky had become the guardian of her 16-year-old brother Brody (Paul Scherrer) after their parents died a year earlier. Jay Mohr, Hilary Swank, and Margaret Langrick all appeared as Dorfman, Danielle, and Beth, respectively—all were friends of Brody's in the first pilot. The latter three, along with Tina Majorino, were the only cast members from the Camp Bicknell pilot who were retained when the project was retitled Camp Wilder and underwent casting changes. The original pilot was never aired.

== Episodes ==
No.	Title	Directed by	Written by	Original release date
1	"Bad Influence"	Arlene Sanford	Matthew Carlson	September 18, 1992
2	"See Spot Go"	Arlene Sanford	Donald Todd	September 25, 1992
3	"The First Kiss"	Arlene Sanford	Matthew Carlson	October 2, 1992
4	"To Protect and Serve"	Zane Buzby	Gary Gilbert	October 9, 1992
5	"Melissa's Friend"	Zane Buzby	Matthew Carlson	October 16, 1992
6	"Sophie's Birthday"	Zane Buzby	Matthew Carlson	October 23, 1992
7	"Spirit of Friendship"	David Trainer	Gary Gilbert	October 30, 1992
8	"It's a Wonderful Video"	David Trainer	Gary Gilbert	November 6, 1992
9	"Something Wilder"	David Trainer	Matthew Miller & Barrie Nedler	November 13, 1992
10	"Boy Loses Girl"	Gail Mancuso	Donald Todd	November 20, 1992
11	"Jung at Heart"	Gail Mancuso	Cheryl Holliday	December 4, 1992
12	"A Close Shave"	Gail Mancuso	David Sacks	December 18, 1992
13	"Career Day"	Unknown	Unknown	January 8, 1993
14	"I Love You, Margaret B. Sanger"	James Widdoes	Cheryl Holliday	January 15, 1993
15	"Bringing up Brody"	David Trainer	Unknown	January 22, 1993
16	"Forget-Me-Not"	David Trainer	Unknown	February 5, 1993
17	"Love Stinks"	David Trainer	David Sacks	February 12, 1993
18	"A Portrait of the Artist as a Young Dorfman"	David Trainer	Matthew Carlson	February 19, 1993
19	"That Was Thin, This is Now"	David Trainer	David Sacks	February 26, 1993

== Awards and nominations ==
Year	Award	Result	Category	Recipient
1993	Young Artist Awards	Nominated	Outstanding Actress Under Ten in a Television Series	Tina Majorino
1993	Young Artist Awards	Nominated	Best Young Actress in a New Television Series	Hilary Swank
1993	Young Artist Awards	Nominated	Best Young Actress in a New Television Series	Meghann Haldeman
