= Matthew Carlson =

American television producer and writer

- Born: Matt James Carlson; February 10, 1951 (age 75); Manhattan, New York City, New York, U.S.A
- Education: Cal State Northridge B.A; Cal State Northridge M.Ed
- Occupations: Television producer and writer
- Years active: 1988–present
- Spouse: Wendy Stretten (m. 1988)
- Children: 3

Matthew Carlson (birth name Matt James Carlson; born February 10, 1951) is an American television producer and writer.

He is best known for his work on the series Malcolm in the Middle and The Wonder Years. He was nominated for two Primetime Emmy Awards for his work on the latter series.

Carlson's other television credits include creating Townies; God, the Devil and Bob (a controversial religious satire cancelled after only a few episodes); Camp Wilder; The Boys Are Back; and Men Behaving Badly. He also worked on Big Day, Samantha Who?, Sons of Tucson, Mr. Sunshine and Alexa & Katie.

Carlson also wrote the screenplay for the 1994 film Wagons East starring John Candy and Richard Lewis.

In his latest work, he wrote the Disney+'s original series The Mighty Ducks: Game Changers' episode 5, "Cherry Picker".
