= Townies =

1996 American television sitcom

- Genre: Sitcom
- Created by: Matthew Carlson
- Written by: Linwood Boomer; Matthew Carlson; Jill Condon; Robert Hanning; Jordan Hawley; Laurie Parres; Bruce Rasmussen; William Schifrin; Amy Toomin Straus
- Directed by: Pamela Fryman
- Starring: Molly Ringwald; Jenna Elfman; Lauren Graham; Bill Burr; Ron Livingston
- Theme music composer: Jonathan Wolff
- Composers: Paul Buckley; Ben Vaughn; Jonathan Wolff
- Country of origin: United States
- Original language: English
- No. of seasons: 1
- No. of episodes: 15 (5 unaired)

Production
- Executive producers: Linwood Boomer; Matthew Carlson; Marcy Carsey; Caryn Mandabach; Harvey Myman; Tom Werner
- Producers: Randy Cordray; Patrick Kienlen
- Cinematography: George La Fountaine Sr.
- Editors: Janet Ashikaga; John Neal; Noel Rogers
- Camera setup: Multi-camera
- Running time: 22–24 minutes
- Production companies: Vanity Logo Productions; Carsey-Werner

Original release
- Network: ABC
- Release: September 18 – December 4, 1996

Townies is an American television sitcom that aired on ABC from September 18 to December 4, 1996. Created by Matthew Carlson, the series stars Molly Ringwald, Jenna Elfman, and Lauren Graham.

== Synopsis ==
Set in Gloucester, Massachusetts, Townies follows the lives of three 20-something lifelong friends who work in a restaurant together. No matter how badly they want to leave for the big city, something is always tying them down.

== Cast ==
Cast of Townies: Jenna Elfman, Molly Ringwald, and Lauren Graham

- Molly Ringwald as Carrie Donovan
- Jenna Elfman as Shannon Canotis
- Lauren Graham as Denise Garibaldi Callahan
- Bill Burr as Ryan Callahan (credited as 'Billy Burr')
- Ron Livingston as Kurt Pettiglio
- Dion Anderson as Mike Donovan
- Conchata Ferrell as Marge
- Lee Garlington as Kathy Donovan
- Joseph D. Reitman as Jesse
- Jeff Doucette as Steve

== Episodes ==
Production codes were taken from the United States Copyright Office.

No.	Title	Directed by	Written by	Original release date	Prod. code
1	"Townies"	Pamela Fryman	Matthew Carlson	September 18, 1996	101
2	"The Good Job"	Pamela Fryman	Matthew Carlson	September 25, 1996	102
3	"The Kiss"	Pamela Fryman	Linwood Boomer	October 2, 1996	104
4	"Dead Dogs Wag No Tails"	Pamela Fryman	Jill Condon & Amy Toomin	October 9, 1996	106
5	"Faith, Hope & Charity"	Pamela Fryman	Laurie Parres	October 23, 1996	108
6	"Adventures of Rebound Girl"	Pamela Fryman	Rob Hanning	October 30, 1996	107
7	"Things That Go Bump in the Water"	Pamela Fryman	Bruce Rasmussen	November 6, 1996	109
8	"It's Go Time"	Pamela Fryman	Bruce Rasmussen	November 13, 1996	110
9	"Thanksgiving"	Pamela Fryman	Matthew Carlson	November 27, 1996	111
10	"I'm With Stupid"	Pamela Fryman	Jill Condon & Amy Toomin	December 4, 1996	112
11	"The Penalty Phase"	Pamela Fryman	Bruce Rasmussen	Never aired	103
12	"The Six-Month Itch"	Pamela Fryman	Jordan Hawley & William Schifrin	Never aired	105
13	"Christmas"	Pamela Fryman	Linwood Boomer	Never aired	113
14	"Things to Do in Gloucester When You Are Dead"	Pamela Fryman	Laurie Parres	Never aired	114
15	"The Life of Ryan"	Pamela Fryman	Rob Hanning	Never aired	115

== Reception ==
On the review aggregator website Rotten Tomatoes, 30% of 10 critics' reviews for the first season are positive. The website's consensus reads: "Those awaiting Molly Ringwald's comeback will be sorely disappointed by Townies, a listless comedy about arrested development that is juvenile in all the wrong ways." According to a Star Tribune review shortly prior to airing, the series relied heavily on sexual humor. The show is considered similar to Mystic Pizza, but is described as falling short.
