= Olaf de Fleur =

Icelandic filmmaker (born 1975)

- Fleur, c. 2018
- Born: Ólafur Jóhannesson; 1975 (age 50–51); Búðardalur, Iceland
- Occupations: Film director; scriptwriter; film producer
- Notable work: See § Filmography

Ólafur Jóhannesson (born 1975), better known by the pseudonym Olaf de Fleur, is an Icelandic film director, scriptwriter, and producer.

== Early life ==
Fleur was born in Búðardalur, Iceland. He founded the independent production company, Poppoli Pictures, in 2003. Poppoli's first production, Shining Star, brought him Best Documentary Feature award at the Icelandic Film Awards (The Edda) in 2004. Shining Star is an autobiographical story of Icelandic rock icon Bubbi Morthens. He won the award again in 2005 for the feature documentary Africa United, which follows the formation of a football team of immigrants from all over the world who intend to take the Icelandic 3rd division by storm. It is an enchanting journey into the dreams and aspirations of a football-crazy coach and his colorful ensemble of players who have to overcome their egos for a true team spirit. His third documentary, entitled Act Normal, saw release in 2006. It is a film about a Buddhist monk who in the 10 years that it took to film the project, disrobes, marries and divorces before becoming a monk again. Olaf commenced that project years before founding Poppoli Pictures, when as a young man he was exploring the Buddhist way.

== Film career ==
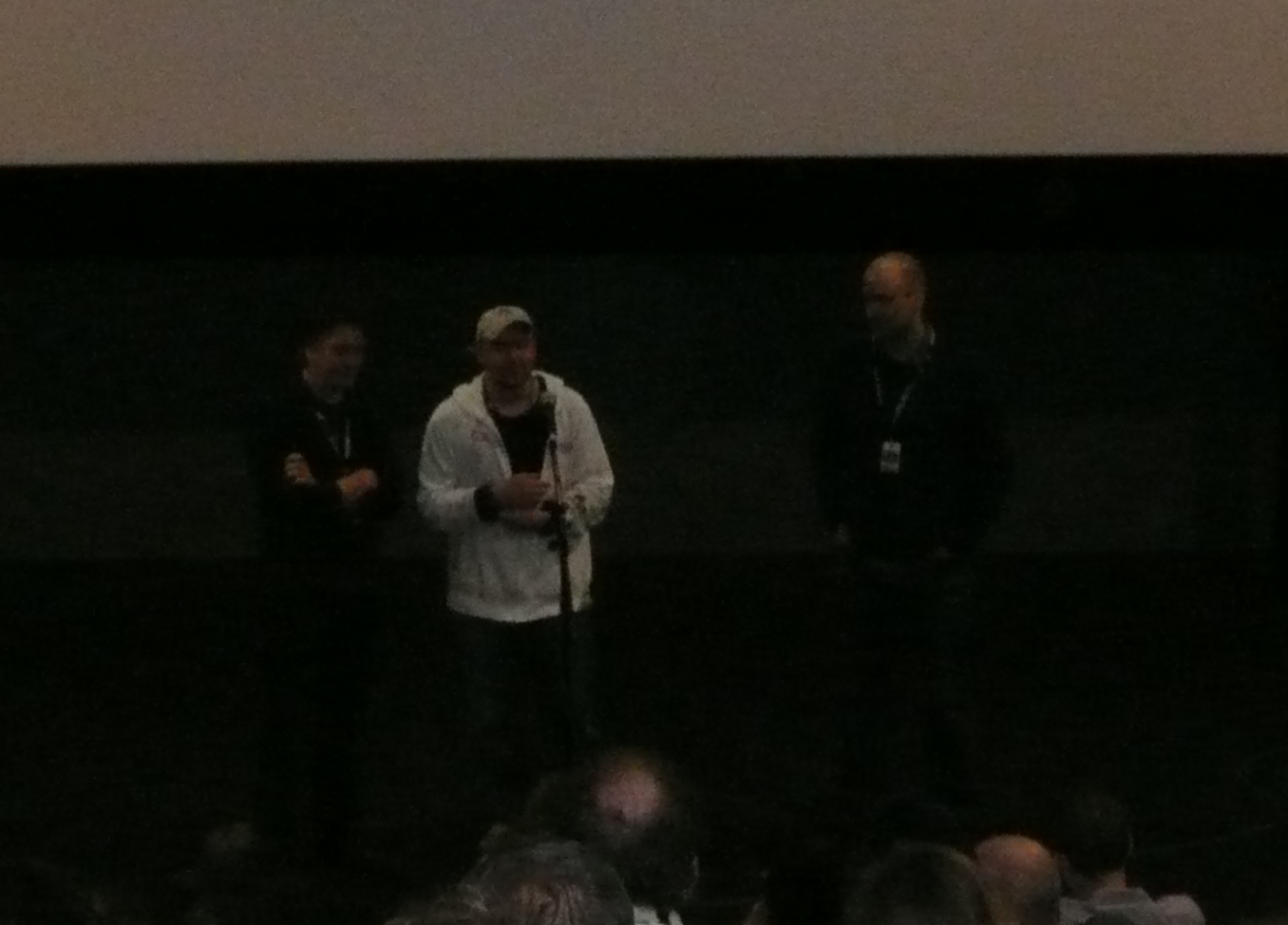
Olaf in 2009 at the International Film Festival Rotterdam

Olaf wrote and directed his first feature film, The Amazing Truth About Queen Raquela, which won him the Teddy award for Best Feature at the Berlinale (Berlin International Film Festival) in 2008 where it was presented in the Panorama section of the festival. The film travelled the festival circuit for over two years, has won numerous awards internationally and received the Best Nordic Council Film Prize nomination in 2009. It received the Grand Jury Prize in the 10th 2008 Cinemanila International Film Festival at Malacañan Palace's Kalayaan Hall. Furthermore, it has won "Best Feature" and "Showtime Vanguard Award" at the New York LGBT International Film Festival and as well as the "Special contribution to cinema language" award at Cinemacity in Serbia in 2008. The film depicts the life of Raquela, a Filipino transgender girl, born in the wrong male body. She dreams of escaping her life of internet porn and hustling in Cebu, Philippines, for a fairytale life in Paris. But first she must take an unexpected detour.

Olaf released his second feature, The Higher Force, in 2008. It is a comedy that was well received by the national audience. The Higher Force premiered internationally at the AFI Film Festival in November 2008 and shortly after it was included in the official selection at the International Film Festival Rotterdam and traveled to several other international film festivals. The film tells of a low-life debt collector becomes the main man in his gang through twists and turns where he makes his fellow gang members believe there is a newly returned crime lord coming to take back his territory, when in fact this mystery person is a mere lonely and deranged school teacher.

In 2011, Olaf and his producer Kristin Andrea released one documentary called Adequate Beings and two fiction features, City State and Polite People. Adequate Beings is a documentary project focusing on the farming community of Olaf's childhood stomping grounds, Budardalur valley on the west coast of Iceland where small farmers are facing bankruptcy as their old practices are undermined by complex trade regulations and market forces beyond their control, just as is occurring worldwide with the advancement of globalization. It premiered at the Icelandic documentary festival Skjaldborg and was a part of the Icelandic focus at the Reykjavik International Film Festival.

Polite People is a black comedy starring Stefán Karl Stefánsson who portrays a desperate city slicker engineer who cheats his way into a small farming community by pretending to know how to re-finance the community's slaughterhouse and save the town, not knowing that he's walking into a local turmoil of small-town politics and general misbehaving. Recently, the film received 4 nominations at the Icelandic Film Awards (The Edda) including best script.

City State is set in modern-day Iceland, an immigrant vows revenge after losing his unborn child in an attack by a crime syndicate, thereby binding his fate with a troubled policewoman, her corrupt police commander, and a crime lord who's losing his edge. Starring Ágústa Eva Erlendsdóttir, Ingvar E. Sigurðsson, Sigurður Sigurjónsson and Zlatko Krickic this Nordic crime drama shares similar spirit of the Millennium series or the Pusher trilogy. City State received 9 nominations for the Icelandic Film Awards (The Edda) and won for Best Sound Design. Although unreleased internationally, City State is scheduled for a Hollywood remake with director James Mangold.

== Filmography ==
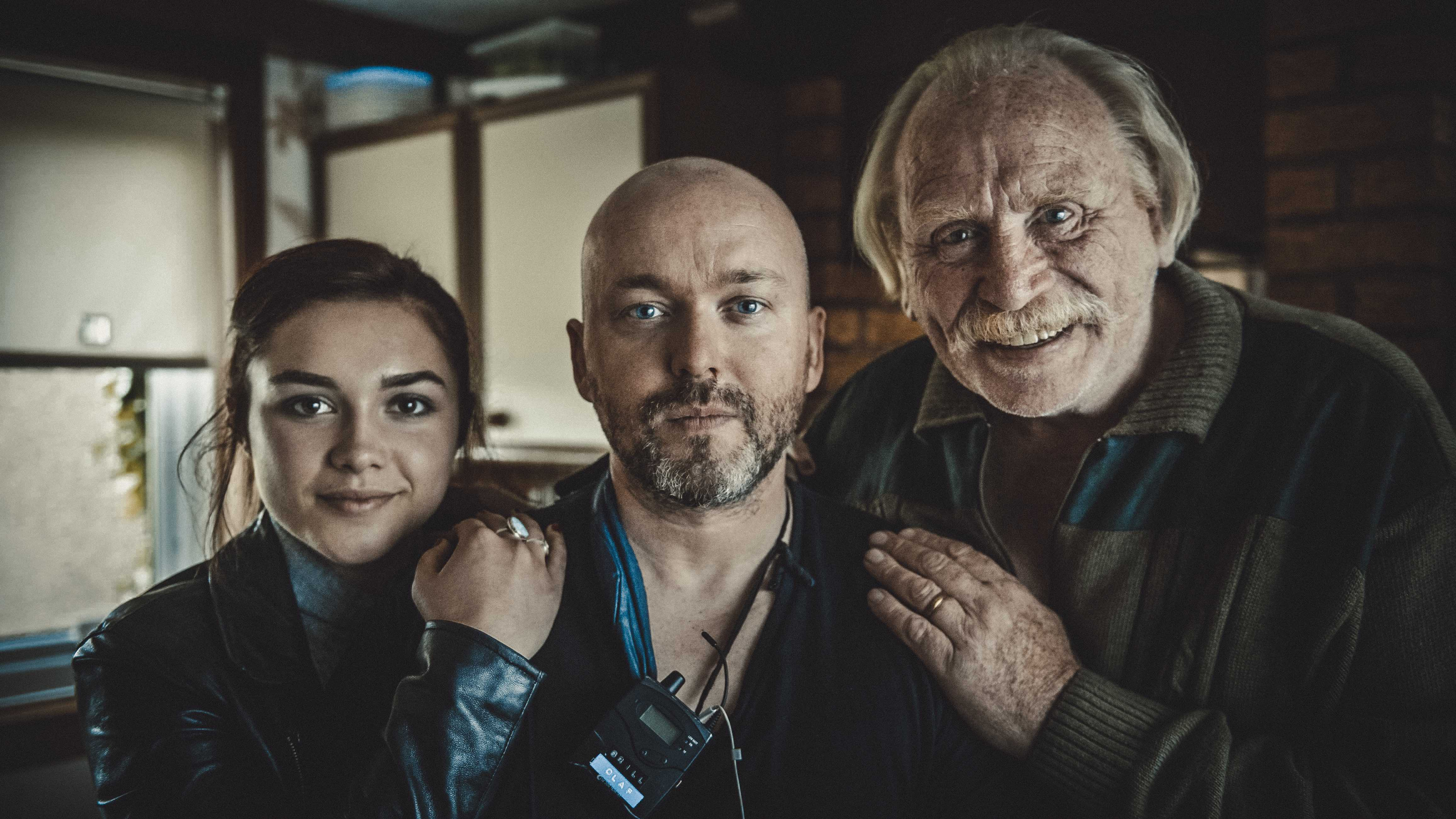
Fleur (center) with Florence Pugh and James Cosmo on the set of Malevolent

- Shining Star (Icelandic title: Blindsker) (Documentary, 2004)
- Africa United (Documentary, 2005)
- Act Normal (Documentary, 2006)
- The Amazing Truth About Queen Raquela (Feature, 2008)
- The Higher Force (Icelandic title: Stóra planið) (Feature, 2008)
- Circledrawers (Webisodes, 2009)
- Polite People (Icelandic title: Kurteist fólk) (Feature, 2011)
- Adequate Beings (Icelandic title: Land míns föður) (Documentary, 2011)
- City State (Icelandic title: Borgríki) (Feature, 2011)
- Brave Men's Blood (Feature, 2014)
- Malevolent (Netflix Feature, 2018)
- King of the Butterfies (Documentary, 2022)
- Self-Defence (Documentary, 2025)
