= Malevolent (2018 film) =

2018 film by Olaf de Fleur

- Release poster
- Directed by: Olaf de Fleur
- Screenplay by: Ben Ketai; Eva Konstantopoulos
- Based on: Hush by Eva Konstantopoulos
- Produced by: Brian Coffey; Danny Sherman
- Starring: Florence Pugh; Celia Imrie; Ben Lloyd-Hughes
- Cinematography: Bjarni Felix Bjarnason
- Edited by: David Arthur; Zach Clark
- Music by: Al Hardiman
- Production companies: Sigma Films; Thruline Entertainment; Catalyst Global Media
- Distributed by: Netflix
- Release date: 5 October 2018
- Running time: 88 minutes
- Country: United Kingdom
- Language: English

Malevolent is a 2018 British supernatural horror film directed by Olaf de Fleur Johannesson from a screenplay by Ben Ketai and Eva Konstantopoulos, based on her 2011 novel Hush. The film stars Florence Pugh and Ben Lloyd-Hughes as a brother–sister team of scam artists who fake paranormal encounters. During an assignment at a country house, the team get more than they bargained for, and begin to lose their grip on reality. The cast also features Scott Chambers, Georgina Bevan, James Cosmo and Celia Imrie.

Malevolent was released on Netflix on 5 October 2018 to mixed reviews from critics.

== Plot ==
In 1986 Scotland, American siblings Angela and Jackson, along with a small team, run scams on clients who believe their houses are haunted. Using the reputation of the siblings' late mother, they promote Angela's powers as a medium. Much of their gains are used by Jackson to pay off loan sharks. During some of the scams, strange incidents occur but go unnoticed by most. Angela, however, experiences hallucinations and relates to her mother, who heard voices and saw people who were not there, eventually committing suicide.

A new client, Mrs. Greene, calls about the "screaming" of ghost girls in her house. After some research, Angela discovers that, fifteen years prior, the owner's foster children were found dead with their mouths sewn shut, and Mrs. Greene's son Herman was blamed. Shaken from their last assignment, Angela turns down the request. However, Jackson, desperate to pay off the loan sharks, agrees to the job, ignoring Angela's worries. Jackson's team formulate a plan to con Mrs. Greene, who orders them to stay away from the East Wing. While cameraman Elliot films Angela around the mansion, she sees the murdered girls' spirits. She follows them into the east wing, where the floor collapses under Elliot. Coming to his aid, Jackson and Angela discover a stone cell where the girls had been imprisoned. Though Angela tells Jackson she really can see spirits, he thinks she and Elliot have some scheme of their own and grows angry.

Now that the ghost hunters have seen her crimes, Mrs. Greene denounces them as scam artists and demands they leave. It becomes apparent that Jackson also inherited their mother's abilities, but has been suppressing it with drugs and loud music. He quits after Mrs. Greene implies that the girls deserved to be murdered. Jackson finds Beth, his girlfriend, unconscious with her mouth sewn shut in the attic. Attempting to flee with the others, Jackson accidentally crashes the car into a tree, killing Beth.

Herman finds them at the car and knocks Jackson and Elliot unconscious. Herman then takes Jackson back to the house, where Mrs. Greene mutilates his face and sews his mouth shut. She orders Herman to kill Jackson in the shed. Angela intervenes, only to be captured. As Mrs. Greene begins sewing Angela's mouth, Elliot manages to kill Herman and Mrs. Greene then attacks Elliot with a bone saw. The dead girls' spirits appear and Angela begs them to help. The ghosts scream, distracting Mrs. Greene and allowing Angela to free herself and kill her. She tells Elliot to wait while she goes to find medical help for them.

Limping away from the house, Angela sees Jackson's ghost searching for Beth. Wandering down the road, Angela breaks down crying, attracting the attention of a passing car. Angela and Elliot are taken to the hospital. She calls her grandfather, who is worried she is suffering from the same illness as her mother. He offers to come join her, as she should not be all alone. As the dark shadow of a presumed ghost passes over Angela, she assures him that she is not alone.

== Cast ==
- Florence Pugh as Angela Sayers
- Ben Lloyd-Hughes as Jackson Sayers
- Scott Chambers as Elliot
- Georgina Bevan as Beth
- James Cosmo as Grandpa Sayers
- Celia Imrie as Mrs. Greene
- Stephen McCole as Frank
- Daisy Mathewson as Susie
- Charlotte Allen as Maddy
- Nicola Grier as Christine Sayers
- Shelley Conn as Samantha Harlow
- Ian Milne as Craig
- Charles Barrett as Victor
- Emma Atkin as Claire
- Flora Brady as Missy
- Anna Coote as Tammy
- Niall Greig Fulton as Herman

== Release ==
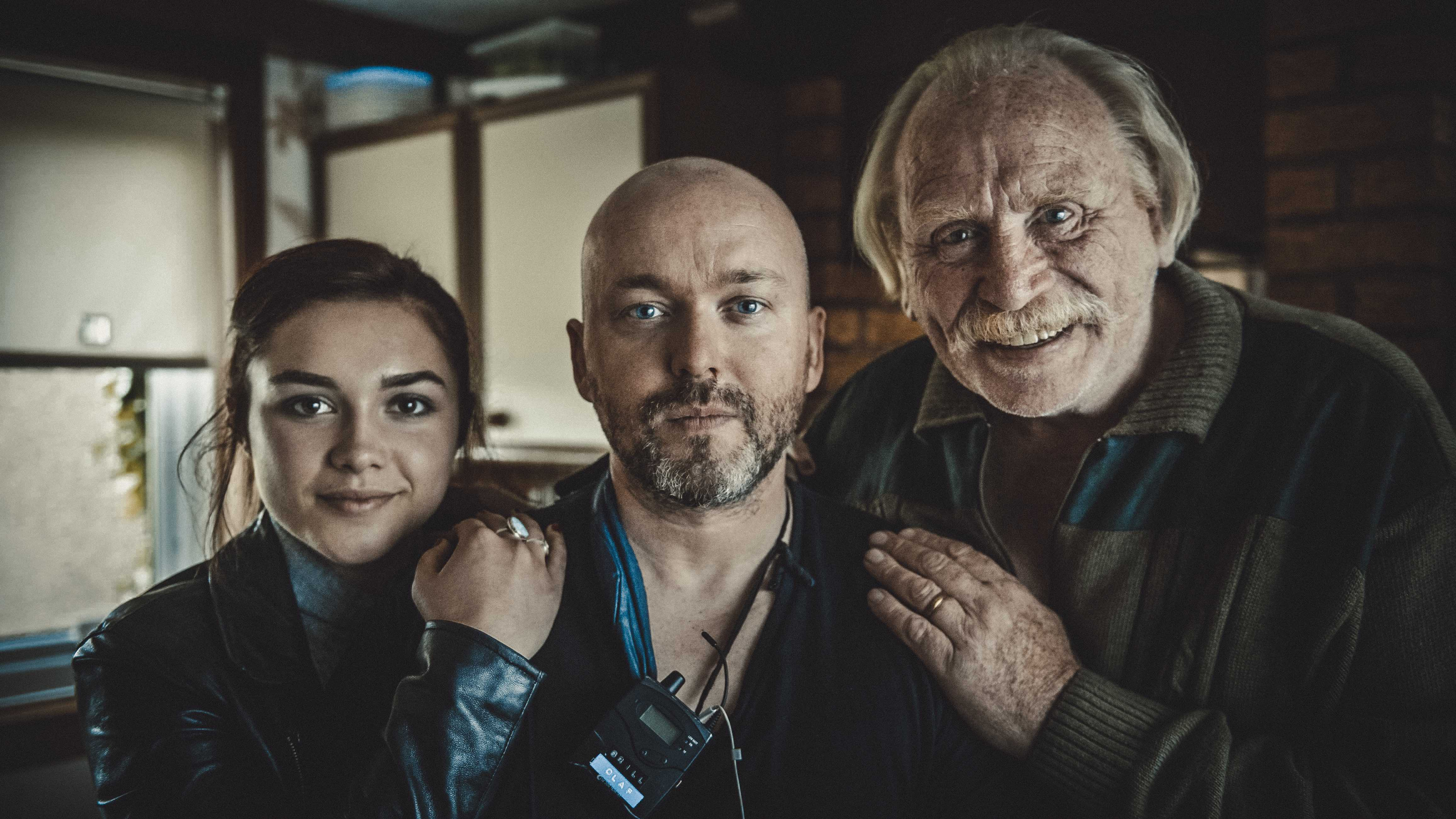
Florence Pugh, Olaf de Fleur and James Cosmo on the set of Malevolent

The film was released on Netflix on 5 October 2018.

== Reception ==
On the review aggregator website Rotten Tomatoes, the film holds an approval rating of 55% based on 11 critics, with an average rating of 5.5/10.

Brian Tallerico of RogerEbert.com wrote, "It's not going to be anyone's favorite new horror film this holiday season, but it's a solid enough start to the month when temperatures drop and it becomes cooler to tell ghost stories".
