= Meghann Haldeman =

American actress

Meghann Michelle Haldeman is an American actress.

== Career ==
Meghann Haldeman's first credit was a guest appearance in the 18th episode (On Another Plane: Part 1) of the third season of Murphy Brown. In the same year, she co-starred in the television film Bad Attitudes as Angela, an eccentric rocker who communicates through gestures while constantly wearing her headphones and whose only line is spoken in the final scene.

The first television series in which Haldeman played a regular character was Camp Wilder, a sitcom about a family living in the suburbs of Los Angeles, which premiered on September 18, 1992. The series was canceled in 1993 after 19 episodes due to low ratings. In it, Haldeman starred alongside two future Academy Award winners: Jared Leto (Best Supporting Actor in 2014) and Hilary Swank (Best Actress in 2000 and in 2004).

Her next television series was Harts of the West, in which she played L’Amour, the daughter of Dave Hart, who lives in a fantasy world inspired by old TV and movie Westerns. After a near-fatal heart attack, Dave decides to pursue his dream, quits his job, and moves the family to a ranch in the West. The sharp contrast between romantic notions and the harsh reality of ranch life led to memorable moments in the series, which aired on CBS from September 1993 to June 1994.

In 1995, Haldeman appeared in the television film Family Reunion: A Relative Nightmare. That same year, she debuted in The Home Court, the last series in which she had a regular role, playing 16-year-old sardonic Neal Solomon.

Haldeman made a guest appearance in the second episode (Boy Meets Real World) of the fifth season of Boy Meets World, originally broadcast on October 10, 1997.

Haldeman enrolled at the Tisch School of the Arts at New York University and later left her acting career behind. After graduating, she worked with her mother to open a new-parent resource center in Los Angeles and later worked as an elementary school teacher. She currently writes on her personal blog mothersucked and has also contributed to Scary Mommy and Mutha Magazine. She is working on a novel titled Cult Mama.

Haldeman lives with her husband and two daughters in Los Angeles. She is the sister of screenwriter, producer, and actress Molly Haldeman.

== Nominations ==
Award	Year	Category	Series	Result	Ref.
Youth in Film Awards	1993	Best Young Actress in a New Television Series	Camp Wilder	Nominated
Youth in Film Awards	1994	Youth Actress Leading Role in a Television Series	Harts of the West	Nominated
Youth in Film Awards	1996	Best Performance by a Young Actress: TV Comedy Series	The Home Court	Nominated
