= Confess (film) =

- Directed by: Stefan Schaefer
- Written by: Stefan Schaefer
- Produced by: Ben Odell; Jonathan Stern
- Starring: Eugene Byrd; Ali Larter; Melissa Leo; Glenn Fitzgerald; William Sadler
- Cinematography: Leland Krane
- Music by: Scott Jacoby
- Release date: October 21, 2005
- Running time: 87 minutes
- Country: United States
- Language: English

Confess is a 2005 American independent feature film written and directed by Stefan Schaefer.

== Plot ==
Terroll Lessor (played by Eugene Byrd) is a computer genius in an unpleasant job. He decides to use his skills against reprehensible parts of society. Along with his girlfriend (played by Ali Larter), he gains embarrassing information on people whom he believes to be immoral and exposes this information to the public. This garners the attention of police and people who wish him harm, and results in copy-cat crimes by others who admire him.

In its review of the film, Variety described the plot: "A black, downwardly mobile computer genius abducts corporate and governmental VIPs and taunts them into “confessing” the racism, exploitation and naked self-interest behind their smooth official facades. He then uploads their confessions onto an increasingly popular Web site."

== Cast ==
- Eugene Byrd as Terell Lessor
- Ali Larter as Olivia Averill
- Melissa Leo as Agnes Lessor
- Glenn Fitzgerald as Greg Lanser
- William Sadler as Roger Lampert
- Betsy Aidem as Julia Bradford
- Curtiss Cook as Security Guard (uncredited)

== Festivals and distribution ==
Confess had its world premiere at the Hamptons International Film Festival, where Stefan Schaefer won the Best Screenwriter award. It also screened at Method Fest Independent Film Festival, where Eugene Byrd won the Break-Out Acting Award, as well as markets in Berlin, Cannes and Hong Kong.

The film was produced by Ben Odell and Jonathan Stern of Centrifugal Films, in association with Cicala Filmworks. The film is distributed by New Films International and MTI.
