= Harts of the West =

Western television series

- Genre: Western
- Starring: Beau Bridges; Harley Jane Kozak; Lloyd Bridges
- Theme music composer: Clint Black
- Country of origin: United States
- Original language: English
- No. of seasons: 1
- No. of episodes: 15

Production
- Executive producers: Robert Moloney; Peter Locke; Donald Kushner
- Running time: 60 mins.
- Production company: The Kushner-Locke Company

Original release
- Network: CBS
- Release: September 25, 1993 – June 18, 1994

Harts of the West is a humorous contemporary Western TV series about a Chicago family moving to a run-down Nevada ranch. The series consists of 15 hour-long episodes that aired on CBS Saturdays, 9:00 to 10:00 p.m., from September 1993 until June 1994.

Much of the series was shot on location in downtown Mayer, Arizona, a small town near Prescott. Clint Black wrote and sang the theme song, In a Laid Back Way.

CBS scheduled the series between two popular Westerns: Dr. Quinn, Medicine Woman and Walker, Texas Ranger, and it received positive reviews. One reviewer wrote "Don't make the mistake of ignoring Harts of the West", and another stated the show was "One of the fall season's more appealing new series." However, the series left the schedule in January 1994, with a few final episodes being shown in June 1994.

== Synopsis ==
Dave Hart was a lingerie salesman in Chicago who'd always dreamed of being a cowboy. He had named his three children after Western writers and an actor – 16-year-old son Zane after Zane Grey, 15-year-old daughter L'Amour after Louis L'Amour, and 10-year-old son John Wayne (called Duke) after the famous Western star. After suffering a mild heart attack Dave decided to follow his dream, and purchased the Flying Tumbleweed Ranch, sight unseen, after reading a sales brochure published in 1957. Duke is the only other family member in favor of moving out West.

The property is a dude ranch in disrepair, near the town of Sholo, Nevada, population 90. Sholo's business district has a trading post - grocery store run by a Native American named Auggie, and the Hanging Tree Cafe, run by the sheriff, R.O., and his ex-wife Rose.

Dave goes out to the Flying Tumbleweed and is shot at by Jake, a grizzled ex-convict who claims to be the ranch foreman. Jake informs Dave that the man who sold the ranch has died, and his ashes are scattered over the Flying Tumbleweed. The foreman is able to find a group of motley ranch hands, some with a prison record. Dave's wife, Allie, is willing to try ranch life for a while, though the elder children initially have little enthusiasm for the idea.

== Cast ==
- Beau Bridges as Dave Hart
- Harley Jane Kozak as Alison "Allie" Hart, Dave's wife
- Lloyd Bridges as Jake Tyrell
- Sean Murray as Zane Grey Hart, Dave's 16-year-old son
- Meghann Haldeman as L'Amour Hart, Dave's 15-year-old daughter
- Nathan Watt as John Wayne "Duke" Hart, Dave's 10-year-old son
- Saginaw Grant as Auggie Velasquez
- Talisa Soto as Cassie Velasquez, Auggie's granddaughter
- Stephen Root as R.O. Moon, the sheriff
- O-Lan Jones as Rose McLaughlin, R.O.'s ex-wife
- Sterling Mucer, Jr. as Marcus St. Cloud
- Dennis Fimple as Garral

== Episodes ==
No.	Title	Directed by	Written by	Original release date
1	"Pilot"	Robert Lieberman	Robert Moloney	September 25, 1993
After Dave Hart has a coronary episode he follows his dream of being a cowboy and puts a down payment on a ranch shown in a 1957 sales brochure.
2	"The Right Stuff"	Bill D'Elia	Robert Moloney	October 2, 1993
Dave hires a former rodeo champ (Mark Harmon), and a moving company loses the Hart's belongings.
3	"Guess Who's Coming to Chow?"	James Hayman	Robert Moloney	October 30, 1993
Allie's mother (Diane Ladd) visits the ranch, and is attracted to Jake.
4	"Dead Man's Leap"	James Hayman	Chris Ruppenthal	November 6, 1993
Zane risks his life to try and make friends, and R.O. claims to channel the dead after being struck by lightning.
5	"Goodnight, Irene"	Bill D'Elia	Jill Gordon	November 13, 1993
Someone killed Garrel's cow, Irene, plus Allie takes a teaching job and learns that Duke is failing in school.
6	"Cowboyz in the Hood"	Scott Brazil	Story by : Bill Spoon, Robert Moloney & Chris Ruppenthal; Teleplay by : David Debin	December 4, 1993
Marcus brings a troubled teen to the ranch, and Zane follows Cassie to a roundup.
7	"Auggie's End"	Greg Beeman	Mark Masucka	December 11, 1993
Auggie begins to prepare for his death, but Dave tries to convince the man his time to die has not come.
8	"Jake's Brother"	Bill D'Elia	Jill Gordon	December 25, 1993
A family feud is rekindled when Jake's brother (Dale Robertson) comes for a visit.
9	"Ghost Run"	Neal Israel	Trish Soodik	January 8, 1994
The local buckboard race becomes a battle of the sexes when Allie competes, and R.O. tries to talk Rose out of entering a beauty contest.
10	"You Got to Have Hart"	James Hayman	Story by : Jill Gordon; Teleplay by : Mike Lyons & Kimberly Wells	January 15, 1994
When Marcus breaks his leg Dave represents Sholo at the annual local rodeo. L'Amour tells an admirer she's nineteen.
11	"Home Alone … With Friends"	Greg Beeman	Trish Sookik	January 22, 1994
Rose kicks out ex-husband R.O. so he moves to the Flying Tumbleweed.
12	"Hart's Vacation"	Mel Damski	Chris Ruppenthal	January 29, 1994
During a family camping trip Dave falls down an abandoned mine shaft. After that the Harts are threatened by a bear and a tornado.
13	"Back in the Panties Again"	James Hayman	James Kramer	June 4, 1994
When the ranch well runs dry Dave works at a Las Vegas lingerie convention.
14	"Drive, He Said"	Neal Israel	Robert Moloney	June 11, 1994
When a trucking company raises the price of shipping livestock to the market Dave organizes a cattle drive.
15	"Jake and Duke's Excellent Adventure"	Helaine Head	Robert Moloney	June 18, 1994
Jake wants to celebrate Duke's 10th birthday with a Native American rite of passage. Allie thinks she's pregnant.

== Media availability ==
In 2005 Tango released the Harts of the West series set on DVD. On October 17, 2017 Mill Creek Entertainment released the DVD set Harts of the West The Complete Series.

== Bibliography ==
- Tim Brooks and Earle Marsh, The Complete Directory to Prime Time Network and Cable TV Shows 1946–Present, Ninth edition (New York: Ballantine Books, 2007) ISBN 978-0-345-49773-4
