= God, the Devil and Bob =

American animated sitcom

- Genre: Animated sitcom Satire
- Created by: Matthew Carlson
- Voices of: James Garner; Alan Cumming; French Stewart; Nancy Cartwright; Jeff Doucette; Laurie Metcalf; Kath Soucie
- Composer: Sean Murray
- Country of origin: United States
- Original language: English
- No. of seasons: 1
- No. of episodes: 13

Production
- Executive producers: Matthew Carlson; Harvey Myman; Marcy Carsey; Tom Werner; Caryn Mandabach
- Running time: 22 minutes
- Production companies: Vanity Logo Productions; NBC Studios; The Carsey-Werner Company

Original release
- Network: NBC
- Release: March 9 – March 28, 2000
- Network: Adult Swim
- Release: January 8 – March 26, 2011

God, the Devil and Bob is an American animated sitcom which aired on NBC from March 9 to March 28, 2000, It was created by Matthew Carlson. The entire series was released on Region 1 DVD in the United States on January 4, 2005. Reruns of the series began airing on Cartoon Network's late night sister time-sharing network, Adult Swim, on January 1, 2011, with the network airing of the series from January 8 to March 26, 2011.

Thirteen episodes were made, but only four were broadcast in the United States before the series was canceled due to a combination of low ratings and pressure from religious activists, despite receiving mostly positive reviews from critics and audiences alike.

James Garner wrote in his memoirs that "It's a shame we went out of business so soon because I loved playing God."

The show, however, was well received in places such as the United Kingdom, Ireland, and Latin America (including Brazil), where BBC Two, RTÉ, and Fox, respectively, aired the entire series. It was once broadcast on the now-defunct Philippine channel Maxxx.

== Synopsis ==
The series was based on God (voiced by James Garner) and the Devil (voiced by Alan Cumming) making a bet over the fate of the world. God wants to wipe humanity off the face of the planet and start over, but he realizes that he is "not that kind of God." The Devil gets to choose one person, and if that person does not prove they have made the world a better place, God will destroy the world. The Devil chooses Bob Allman (voiced by French Stewart), a beer-drinking, porno-watching auto plant worker from the suburbs of Detroit who, when asked to save humanity from complete annihilation, asks "What's in it for me?" After he saves humanity in the pilot episode, the series revolves around Bob being God's "Go-To Guy" whenever he gets a great idea to help out the world.

== Characters ==
- God (voiced by James Garner) - The laid-back, beer-drinking deity, whose human appearance is visually styled on Jerry Garcia of The Grateful Dead. Though he is distressed with the state of the world and is considering destroying it and starting over, even going so far as to design a new universe where marsupials replace humanity and humanity "is somewhere down the food chain", he wants to give humanity a sporting chance. Though he and the Devil appear to have put much of their differences behind them, and are frequently seen socializing, God has a habit of constantly forgetting the devil's birthday.
- The Devil (also known as Lucifer) (voiced by Alan Cumming) - The Devil is trying to persuade God to destroy the world, and is constantly trying to thwart Bob in his attempts to save it. He is a margarita drinker and drives a purple Dodge Charger described by Bob as the "coolest car [he's] ever seen". Despite appearances, the Devil is needy and co-dependent, often reduced to tears when God ignores or forgets about him, to the point that he planned to go to war with Heaven when God forgot their golf outing. He also goes into vicious rants when he loses a game (i.e. bowling with God). Robert Downey Jr. was originally cast to voice the Devil, but was forced to withdraw from the role due to his relapse into drug addiction.
- Bob Allman (voiced by French Stewart) - The porn-watching, heavy-drinking, surly under-educated prophet/messenger of God. He is an auto plant worker from Detroit, and is a huge fan of the Red Wings. Despite his numerous failings, God has faith in him and Bob eventually pulls through. He is very unsure of being qualified or capable to save the world. He clearly loves his family and goes to extreme lengths to keep them safe. However Bob often makes excuses to go drinking at bars and watching sporting events. As the series progresses, Bob appears to start to be on friendly terms with both God and the Devil, though the latter is still frequently antagonistic towards Bob. The character was specifically drawn to look like French Stewart.
- Donna Allman (voiced by Laurie Metcalf) - Bob's wife who is constantly trying her best to be a good mother. There is friction between her and Megan and Donna keeps trying to fix it. She doesn't believe Bob's claims that he is working for God and thinks he must be delusional. She has recently returned to college after 14 years of parenting.
- Megan Allman (voiced by Nancy Cartwright) - Bob and Donna's 13-year-old daughter and eldest child. She is overly rebellious, insistent, very stubborn, bad-tempered and unruly, yet loves her family albeit very deep down.
- Andy Allman (voiced by Kath Soucie) - Bob and Donna's 6-year-old son. He is a sweet, good-natured boy who looks up to his father and wants a genuine relationship with him. He is the only person who really believes Bob talks to God and the Devil.
- Smeck (voiced by Jeff Doucette) - An imp-like demon who is the Devil's henchman and apprentice. In spite of the abuse he suffers at the Devil's hands, he remains loyal to his master. In the episode "Bob Gets Committed", it is revealed that the Devil would fire him were it not for his union and would kill him if he had not promised Smeck's mother on her deathbed.

== Episodes ==
No.	Title	Directed by	Written by	Original release date	Prod. code	U.S. viewers (millions)
1	"In the Beginning"	Jeff DeGrandis	Matthew Carlson	March 9, 2000	101	14.42
God has become disappointed enough in the world to consider destroying it. He decides to give the world a second chance if Bob can show him one soul worth saving, but Bob is unsure how to proceed.
2	"Andy Runs Away"	Swinton O. Scott III	Matthew Carlson	March 14, 2000	105	6.34
Andy runs away to Canada when God refuses to present himself to Andy's friends. The Devil tries being nicer to Smeck. Megan gets a crush on Donna's college classmate.
3	"Date from Hell"	Steve Ressel	Matthew Carlson	March 21, 2000	103	5.96
The Devil doesn't believe that Bob is taking him seriously, so he decides to teach Bob a lesson by dating his daughter.
4	"The Devil's Birthday"	Sherie Pollack	Matthew Carlson	March 28, 2000	106	5.67
The Devil goes to hell with all the world's evil when God forgets his birthday. Note: This is the last episode to air on NBC before the show was cancelled.
5	"Neighbor's Keeper"	Sherie Pollack	Matthew Carlson	January 8, 2011	102	N/A
Bob helps save his neighbors' marriage; Donna decides to return to college after 14 years. Note: This is the first episode to air on Adult Swim, 11 years after they picked up the rest of the unaired episodes from the show's first season.
6	"God's Favorite"	Dan Fausett	Matthew Carlson	January 22, 2011	104	N/A
Bob believes he is indestructible and cannot die; the Devil feels neglected when God doesn't call him about their golf outing.
7	"Bob Gets Committed"	Steve Ressel	Alex Reid	February 12, 2011	107	N/A
When Bob defaces a billboard along the freeway, he gets arrested; when he tells the police he's God's messenger, he gets committed.
8	"Lonely at the Top"	Dan Fausett	Alex Reid	February 19, 2011	108	N/A
God decides to pose as "Arthur from Ypsilanti" to live a day in the life of an average person, but he doesn't fit in with Bob's friends.
9	"Bob Gets Greedy"	Swinton O. Scott III	Gary Murphy & Neil Thompson	February 26, 2011	109	N/A
Bob finds future sports scores on the Devil's Palm Pilot and considers it a blessing when he gambles and wins.
10	"There's Too Much Sex on TV"	Sherie Pollack	Matthew Carlson	March 5, 2011	110	N/A
God sends Bob to Hollywood to do something about all the sex on TV. Guest star: Sarah Michelle Gellar as That Actress on That Show
11	"Bob's Father"	Steve Ressel	Matthew Carlson	March 12, 2011	111	N/A
Bob visits his dying father in the hospital hoping to make amends, but he ends up telling the angry, abusive old man to go to Hell. Guest star: Troy Evans as Tom Allman
12	"God's Girlfriend"	Dan Fausett	Neil Thompson & Gary Murphy	March 19, 2011	112	N/A
While Bob is out with his family, God bumps into an old girlfriend who invites him to dinner. God wants to cancel the date; meanwhile, the Devil attempts to cause chaos in Heaven. Guest stars: Elizabeth Taylor as Sarah and Alan Young as Wilbur Post
13	"Bob Gets Involved"	Swinton O. Scott III	Gary Murphy & Neil Thompson	March 26, 2011	113	N/A
Bob leads a clueless vigilante group determined to fight against the evils of society—totally unaware how his actions will impact his family. Guest star: Kevin Bacon as himself

== Home media ==
20th Century Fox Home Entertainment has released the complete season on DVD in Region 1. The 2-disc set features an extensive array of special features, including commentaries, interviews and audition tapes.

DVD name	Episodes	Release date (region 1)	Special features
Complete Season	13	January 4, 2005	Commentaries by Matt Carlson and Harvey Myman; Voice over audition tapes; Digital Storyboards; "Let There Be God, The Devil and Bob!" Making of God, the Devil and Bob; On the set interviews
