= Act Normal =

2006 Icelandic documentary film by Olaf de Fleur

- Directed by: Olaf de Fleur
- Release date: October 1, 2006
- Running time: 80 minutes
- Country: Iceland
- Language: Icelandic

Act Normal is a 2006 Icelandic documentary by Olaf de Fleur. The film revolves around Robert T. Edison who at 18 years of age left Britain for Thailand to become a Buddhist monk. Five years after he moves to Iceland in 1994 to form the first Buddhist sect in the country, he decides to disrobe and get married only to return later to Thailand to become a monk again.
