= The Home Court =

- Created by: Sy Dukane; Denise Moss
- Starring: Pamela Reed; Breckin Meyer; Meghann Haldeman; Robert Hy Gorman; Phillip Van Dyke
- Composer: Bruce Miller
- Country of origin: United States
- Original language: English
- No. of seasons: 1
- No. of episodes: 20 (list of episodes)

Production
- Camera setup: Multi-camera
- Running time: 30 minutes
- Production company: Paramount Television

Original release
- Network: NBC
- Release: September 30, 1995 – June 22, 1996

The Home Court is an American sitcom that aired from September 30, 1995, to June 22, 1996, on NBC. The series starred Pamela Reed as a judge and mother who attempts to juggle her home and professional lives.

The Home Court was a production of Paramount Network Television.

== Premise ==
Sydney J. Solomon is a family-court judge who is also a divorced mother of four: 19-year-old Mike, 16-year-old Neal, 13-year-old Marshall, and 11-year-old Ellis.

== Cast ==
- Pamela Reed as Sydney J. Solomon
- Meagen Fay as Greer
- Breckin Meyer as Mike Solomon, Sydney's son
- Meghann Haldeman as Neal Solomon, Sydney's daughter
- Robert Hy Gorman as Marshall Solomon, Sydney's son
- Phillip Van Dyke as Ellis Solomon, Sydney's son
- Keith Diamond as Ernie
- Charles Rocket as Judge Gil Fitzpatrick

== Episodes ==
No.	Title	Directed by	Written by	Original release date	Prod. code
1	"Pilot"	Andrew D. Weyman	Sy Dukane and Denise Moss	September 30, 1995	001
Sydney's son decides to quit college.
2	"The Cheesehead Stands Alone"	Noam Pitlik	Tod Himmel and Lisa K. Nelson	October 7, 1995	002
Sydney makes a divorced football star spend a weekend in jail for not visiting his son.
3	"Sleeping Dogs Lie"	Noam Pitlik	Sy Dukane and Denise Moss	October 21, 1995	004
Sydney tries to find out why she was passed over for a spot on a White House committee.
4	"In Cyberspace Everyone Can Hear You Scream"	Noam Pitlik	Steve Skrovan	October 25, 1995	007
Marshall releases a video on the internet of Sydney giving birth to Ellis.
5	"My Kind of Clown"	Unknown	Unknown	November 4, 1995	008
A clown show brings back bad memories for Greer.
6	"Time Flies"	Unknown	Unknown	December 2, 1995	003
Sydney becomes desperate for a romantic relationship.
7	"The Sydney That Works"	Noam Pitlik	Tom Straw	December 9, 1995	005
Sydney tries to get Neal into an elite private school.
8	"Dog Day Afternoon"	Unknown	Unknown	January 6, 1996	010
Sydney insults a new judge, so he decides to make life miserable for her.
9	"The Importance of Being Ernie"	Unknown	Unknown	January 13, 1996	011
Ragsdale tries to steal Ernie away from Sydney.
10	"Laborer of Love"	Unknown	Unknown	January 20, 1996	009
A wealthy divorcee shows an interest in Mike.
11	"Touched by an Anger"	Unknown	Unknown	February 3, 1996	012
Sydney gets court ordered anger management therapy when she beats up a mugger.
12	"An Exercise in Futility"	Unknown	Unknown	February 10, 1996	015
13	"The Great Chicago Fireman"	Unknown	Unknown	March 2, 1996	013
Sydney starts dating the fireman who saved her from a locked bathroom.
14	"Between a Shamrock and a Hard Place"	Unknown	Unknown	March 16, 1996	019
A 9-year-old wants Sydney to put a stop to Chicago's annual St. Patrick's Day parade.
15	"True Lies"	Unknown	Unknown	March 23, 1996	014
Sydney gets Mike a job as the assistant of the courthouse maintenance man.
16	"Bad Boys"	Unknown	Unknown	March 30, 1996	016
Neil wants to go out with a car thief.
17	"Mike Solomon: Unplugged"	Unknown	Unknown	April 6, 1996	017
Mike drops out of his band thanks to some advice from Sydney - just in time to miss their big hit.
18	"Dad"	Unknown	Unknown	April 13, 1996	018
Sydney's father and his fiancee comes for a visit.
19	"Love, Death & Soda"	Unknown	Unknown	April 20, 1996	020
Marshall makes out with a girl at a funeral.
20	"Syd and Sensibility"	Unknown	Unknown	June 22, 1996	006
Sydney dates a young hunk and her ex-husband
