= Don't Care =

Don't Care may refer to:

- "Don't Care", a song by Alex Lifeson from Victor, 1996
- "Don't Care", a song by Galantis from Pharmacy, 2015
- "Don't Care", a song by Obituary from World Demise, 1994
- "Don't Care", a song by Sandra Lyng, 2014
- Don't Care High, a 1985 novel by Gordon Korman
- Don't-care term, in digital logic
- Don't-care condition, in decision tables

== See also ==
- Don't Really Care (disambiguation)
- I Don't Care (disambiguation)
- I Don't Really Care (disambiguation)
