= I Don't Care =

I Don't Care may refer to:

== Albums ==
- I Don't Care (album), a 1964 album by Buck Owens
- I Don't Care: The Album, a 1990 album by Audio Two

== Songs ==
- "I Don't Care" (Eva Tanguay song), 1905
- "I Don't Care (If Tomorrow Never Comes)", a 1947 song by Hank Williams
- "I Don't Care" (Webb Pierce song), 1955, covered by Ricky Skaggs
- "I Don't Care (Just as Long as You Love Me)", a 1964 song by Buck Owens
- "I Don't Care" (Elton John song), 1978
- "I Don't Care" (Shakespears Sister song), 1992
- "I Don't Care" (Angela Via song), 2000; covered by Delta Goodrem, 2001
- "I Don't Care", 2001 song by Natural Born Hippies
- "I Don't Care" (Ricky Martin song), 2005
- "I Don't Care" (Apocalyptica song), 2007
- "I Don't Care" (Fall Out Boy song), 2008
- "I Don't Care" (2NE1 song), 2009
- "I Don't Care" (Elle Varner song), 2012
- "I Love It" (Icona Pop song), 2012, sometimes referred to by this title
- "I Don't Care" (Cheryl song), 2014
- "I Don't Care" (Ed Sheeran and Justin Bieber song), 2019
- "I Don't Care" (Hoshimachi Suisei song), 2025
- "I Don't Care", by Ariana Grande from Dangerous Woman, 2016
- "I Don't Care", by Black Flag from Everything Went Black, covered by Circle Jerks
- "I Don't Care", a song from the Bratz Rock Angelz soundtrack, 2005
- "I Don't Care", a song by Megadeth, from the self-titled 2026 album
- "I Don't Care", by Green Day, featured as a subtrack to the medley "Jesus of Suburbia"
- "I Don't Care", by New Boyz from Too Cool to Care
- "I Don't Care", by Nikki Lane from All or Nothin'
- "I Don't Care", by Ramones from Rocket to Russia
- "I Don't Care", by Rich the Kid from Keep Flexin
- "I Don't Care", by Snoop Dogg from 220
- "I Don't Care", by Eartha Kitt, 1986

== See also ==
- "Baby I Don't Care" by Transvision Vamp
- Don't Care (disambiguation)
- Don't Really Care (disambiguation)
- I Don't Really Care (disambiguation)
- "I Love It" (Icona Pop song)—"I don't care" is the refrain
