= Gordon Korman =

Canadian American author

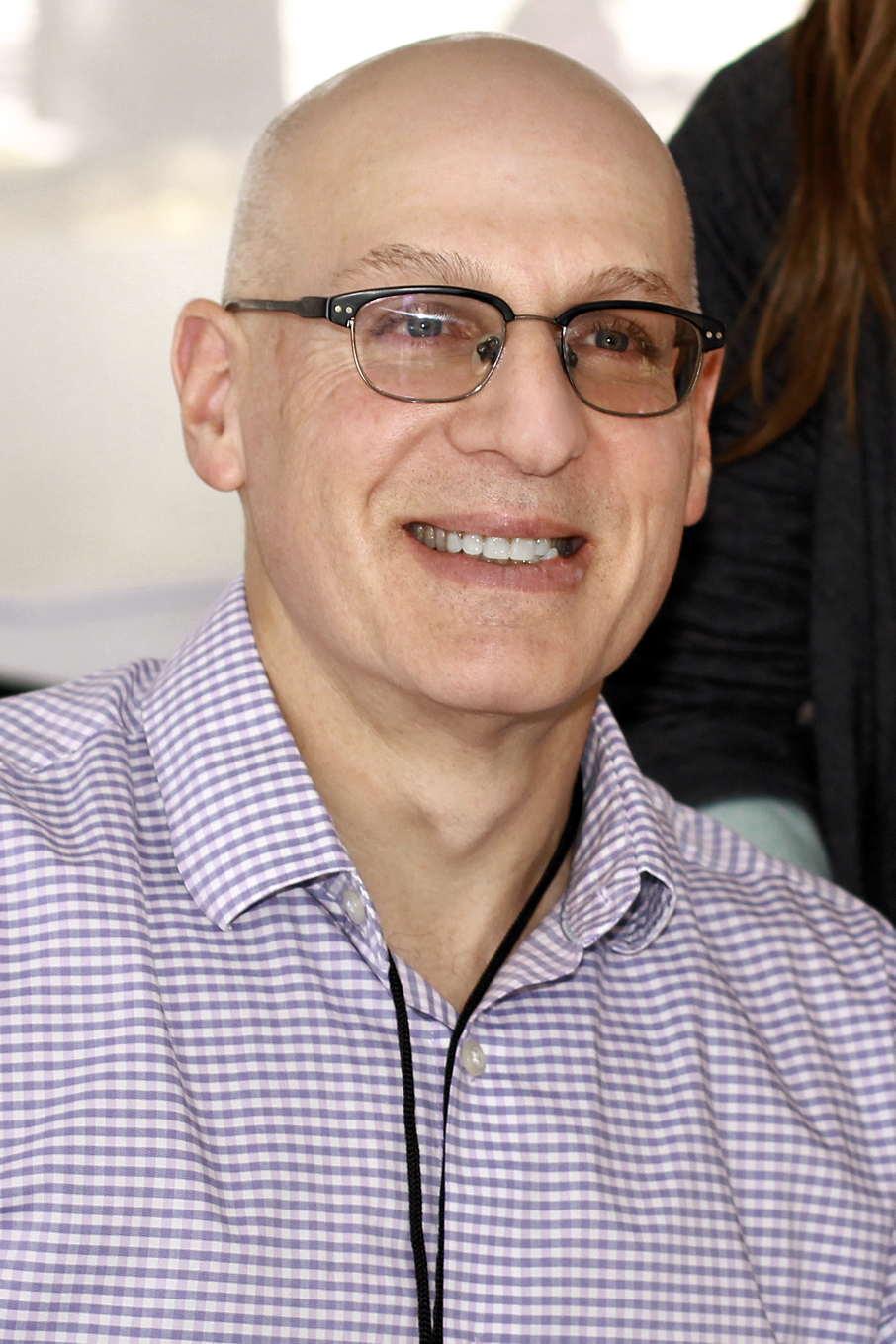
- Korman at the 2015 Texas Book Festival
- Born: 1963 (age 62–63); Montreal, Quebec, Canada
- Education: New York University (BFA)
- Occupation: Author
- Writing career
- Period: 1975–present
- Genres: Realistic fiction, adventure fiction, young adult fiction
- Notable works: Macdonald Hall; Swindle; The Toilet Paper Tigers; The 39 Clues (contributor); Faker; "Operation Do-Over"
- Website: www.gordonkorman.com

Gordon Korman is a Canadian author of children's and young adult fiction books. During the course of his four decade long writing career, Korman's books have sold more than 35 million copies worldwide, and have appeared at number one on The New York Times Best Seller list.

== Early life ==
Korman was born in Montreal, Quebec, where he lived until 1970. He grew up in Thornhill, Ontario (just north of Toronto) and attended German Mills Public School and public high school at Thornlea Secondary School.

He moved to the United States to attend university at New York University where he studied film and film-writing. Korman received a BFA from New York University in 1985; with a degree in dramatic visual writing and a minor in motion picture and television.

== Career ==
Korman wrote his first book when he was 13 years old, as part of an English class taught by a PE teacher in 7th grade. This became the manuscript for This Can't Be Happening at Macdonald Hall, the first book in his Macdonald Hall series. Korman was the Scholastic Arrow Book Club monitor for the class; after completing the assignment, he mailed his manuscript to Scholastic. This Can't Be Happening at Macdonald Hall was published by Scholastic Press in 1978 when Korman was only 14 years old. Before graduating from high school in Thornhill, Ontario, Korman wrote and published five books.

Korman has written 105 books, with his hundredth being The Fort. His books have sold over 35 million copies.

== Works ==
=== Standalone books ===
- I Want to Go Home! (1981)
- Our Man Weston (1982)
- No Coins, Please (1984)
- Don't Care High (1985)
- Son of Interflux (1986)
- A Semester in the Life of a Garbage Bag (1987)
- Radio 5th Grade (1989)
- Losing Joe's Place (1990)
- The Twinkie Squad (1992)
- The Toilet Paper Tigers (1993)
- Why Did the Underwear Cross the Road (1994)
- The Chicken Doesn't Skate (1996)
- Liar, Liar Pants on Fire (1997)
- The Sixth Grade Nickname Game (1998)
- No More Dead Dogs (2000)
- Maxx Comedy: The Funniest Kid in America (2003)
- Jake, Reinvented (2003)
- Born to Rock (2006)
- Schooled (2007)
- The Juvie Three (2008)
- Pop (2009)
- Restart (2017)
- Whatshisface (2018)
- The Unteachables (2019)
- Notorious (2019)
- War Stories (2020)
- Unplugged (2021)
- Linked (2021)
- Operation Do-Over (2022)
- The Fort (2022)
- The Superteacher Project (2023)
- Mixed Up (2023)
- Slugfest (2024)
- Faker (2024)
- Old School (2025)
- Snoop (2025)
- Sleepless (2026)
- The Favorite (2027)
- The Worst (2027)

=== Series ===
==== Macdonald Hall series ====
- This Can't Be Happening at Macdonald Hall (Scholastic-TAB Publications, 1978)
- Go Jump in the Pool (1979)
- Beware the Fish! (1980)
- The Wizzle War (formerly The War With Mr. Wizzle) (1982)
- The Zucchini Warriors (1988)
- Lights, Camera, Disaster (formerly Macdonald Hall Goes Hollywood) (1991)
- The Joke’s On Us (formerly Something Fishy at Macdonald Hall) (1995)

==== Bugs Potter ====
- Who is Bugs Potter? (1980)
- Bugs Potter LIVE at Nickaninny (1983)

==== Jeremy Bloom ====
- The D− Poems of Jeremy Bloom: A Collection of Poems About School, Homework, and Life (Sort Of) (1992)
- The Last-Place Sports Poems of Jeremy Bloom: A Collection of Poems About Winning, Losing, and Being a Good Sport (Sometimes) (1996)

==== Monday Night Football Club ====
- The Quarterback Exchange: I Was John Elway (1997)
- Running Back Conversion: I Was Barry Sanders (1997)
- Super Bowl Switch: I Was Dan Marino (1997)
- Heavy Artillery: I Was Junior Seau (1997)
- Ultimate Scoring Machine: I Was Jerry Rice (1998)
- NFL Rules! Bloopers, Pranks, Upsets, and Touchdowns (1998)

==== Slapshots series ====
- The Stars From Mars (1999)
- The Dream Team (formerly The All-Mars All-Stars) (1999)
- The Face-off Phony (2000)
- Cup Crazy (2000)
  - 4-in-1 Slapshots: The Complete Collection (2008)

==== Nose Pickers series ====
- Nose Pickers from Outer Space! (1999)
- Planet of the Nose Pickers (2000)
- Your Mummy Is a Nose Picker (2000)
- Invasion of the Nose Pickers (2001)
  - 4-in-1 The Ultimate Nose-Picker Collection (2006)

==== Island series ====
- Shipwreck (2001)
- Survival (2001)
- Escape (2001)
  - 3-in-1 Island Trilogy Bind-Up Book (2006)

==== Son of the Mob ====
- Son of the Mob (Hyperion, 2002)
- Son of the Mob 2: Hollywood Hustle (2004)

==== Dive series ====
- The Discovery (2003)
- The Deep (2003)
- The Danger (2003)

==== On the Run series ====
- Chasing the Falconers (2005)
- The Fugitive Factor (2005)
- Now You See Them, Now You Don't (2005)
- The Stowaway Solution (2005)
- Public Enemies (2005)
- Hunting the Hunter (2006)

==== Kidnapped series ====
- The Abduction (2006)
- The Search (2006)
- The Rescue (2006)

==== The 39 Clues ====
(Series shared and all books written by different authors)

- One False Note (2008)
- The Emperor's Code (2010)
- Vespers Rising (2011)
- The Medusa Plot (2011)
- Flashpoint (2014)

==== Swindle series ====
- Swindle (2008)
- Zoobreak (2009)
- Framed (2010)
- Showoff (2012)
- Hideout (2013)
- Jackpot (2014)
- Unleashed (2015)
- Jingle (2016)

==== Titanic series ====
- Unsinkable (2011)
- Collision Course (2011)
- S.O.S (2011)

==== Gifted series ====
- Ungifted (2012)
- Supergifted (2018)
- Hypergifted (2026)

==== Everest series ====
- The Contest (2002)
- The Climb (2002)
- The Summit (2002)

==== Hypnotists series ====
- The Hypnotists (2013)
- Memory Maze (2014)
- The Dragonfly Effect (2015)

==== Slacker series ====
- Slacker (2016)
- Level 13: A Slacker Novel (2019)

==== Masterminds series ====
- Masterminds (2015)
- Masterminds: Criminal Destiny (2016)
- Masterminds: Payback (2017)

== Adaptations ==
The Monday Night Football Club series was adapted as the Disney Channel TV series The Jersey, which ran for four years between 1999 and 2004.

Swindle was adapted into a movie that aired on the American TV network Nickelodeon in 2013.

Three Macdonald Hall series books were TV adapted as the "Bruno & Boots" miniseries, with Go Jump in the Pool, This Can't Be Happening at Macdonald Hall, and The War with Mr. Wizzle (as The Wizzle War). It starred Jonny Gray, Callan Potter and Peter Keleghan. It debuted on April 1, 2016, firstly with Go Jump In The Pool, on the Canadian network YTV. The other two adaptations aired on YTV the next year on the same day.

Other optioned books include No Coins, Please, I Want to Go Home, the Island trilogy and The Twinkie Squad.

== Awards and recognition ==
- 1981 Air Canada Award for promising authors in Canada, at age 17
- 1991 Manitoba Young Reader's Choice Award (chosen by Manitoba schoolchildren), The Zucchini Warriors (1988)
- 1999 ALA Popular Paperbacks for Young Adults, The Toilet Paper Tigers (1993)
- 2001 American Library Association Popular Paperbacks for Young Adults, Losing Joe's Place (1990)
- 2001 ALA Popular Paperbacks for Young Adults, The Chicken Doesn't Skate (1993)
- 2003 ALA Top Ten Best Books for Young Adults, Son of the Mob (2002)
- 2003 Pacific Northwest Library Association Young Reader's Choice Award (chosen by Pacific NW schoolchildren), Intermediate Division (Grades 7–9), No More Dead Dogs (2003)
- 2004 ALA Best Books for Young Adults, Jake Reinvented (2003)
- 2005 PNLA Young Reader's Choice Award – Intermediate, Son of the Mob (2002)
- 2010 PNLA Young Reader's Choice Award – Intermediate, Schooled (2007)
- 2010–2011 Charlie May Simon Children's Book Award (by a vote of Arkansas schoolchildren), Swindle (2008)
- 2011–2012 Charlie May Simon Award, Zoobreak (2009)
- 2016 Anne V. Zarrow Award for Young Readers' Literature
- 2020 Young Hoosier Book Award (Intermediate), Restart (2017)
- 2024 Young Reader's Choice Award (Junior), Unplugged (2021)
