= Student council =

Student representative body in primary and secondary schools

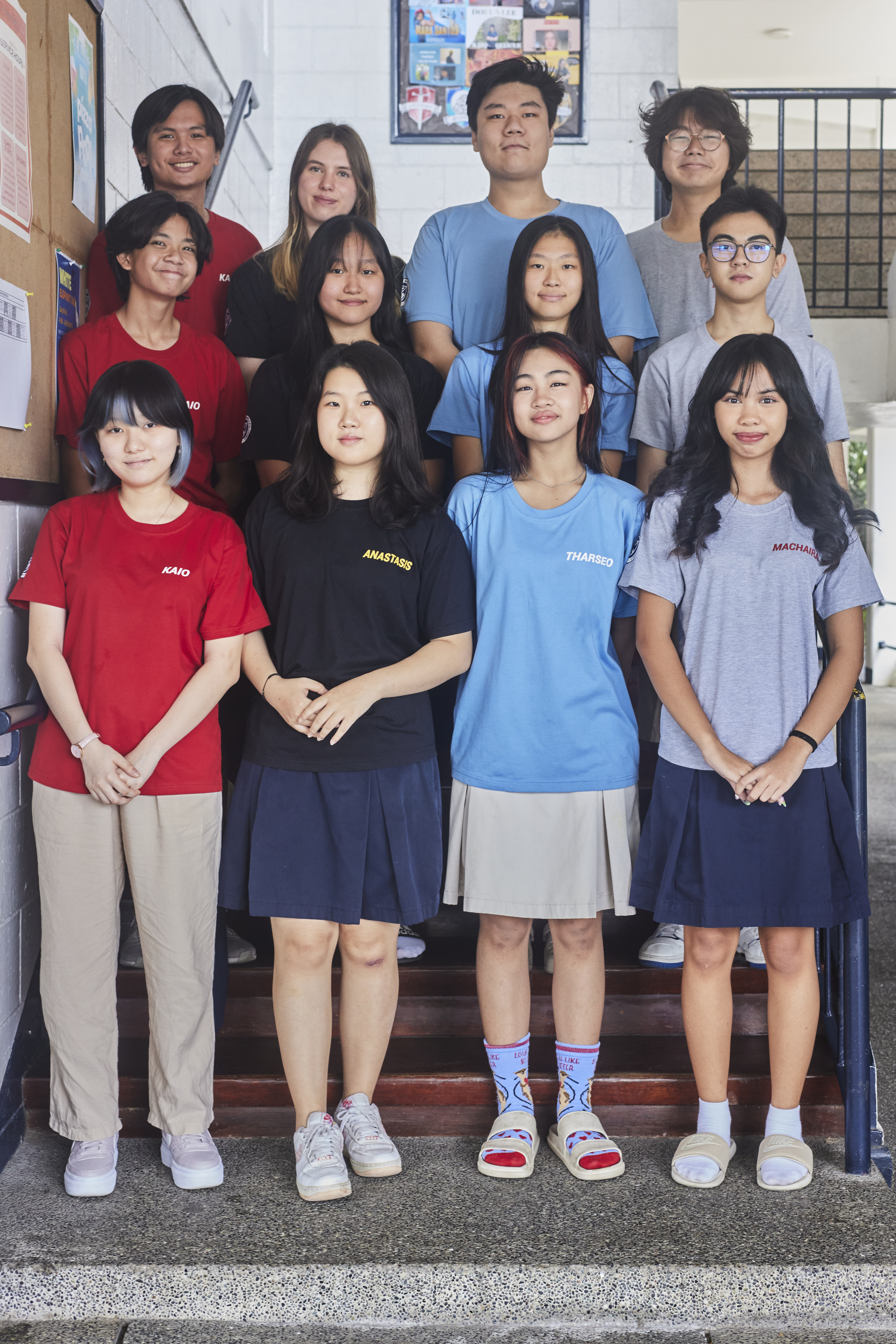
Members of a student council wearing color-coded house shirts

A student council, also known as a student union, a student representative council (SRC) and an associated student body, is a representative student leadership body commonly found in primary and secondary schools, and in some post-secondary institutions. Student councils are typically composed of elected student representatives and officers who serve to express student engagement, facilitate communication between students and school administration, and organize student-led activities and events. In some cases, it is considered a popularity contest, and kids know who's going to win before any ballots are cast.

== Overview ==
Student councils often serve to engage students in learning about democracy and leadership, as originally espoused by John Dewey in Democracy and Education (1917).

In many schools, student councils include representatives elected from individual classes or grade level. These representatives—commonly known as class presidents or class representatives—act as liaisons between their classmates and the broader student council. Their responsibilities typically include communicating class concerns, assisting with the planning of school-wide events, and supporting council initiatives related to student activities and student affairs.

Class representatives are usually elected by their peers within a single grade and may serve alongside other class officers, such as a vice president, secretary, or treasurer. While responsibilities vary by institution, class-level officers generally focus on activities specific to their cohort, whereas student council officers address school-wide matters and policy discussions.

Student councils exist in most K–12 state school and private school systems worldwide and are structurally distinct from students' unions found in governance in higher education institutions.

== Function ==
The student council helps share ideas, interests, and concerns with teachers and institute administrative authorities. Councils frequently organize fundraising activities, school social events, community service projects, and initiatives related to school reform and student welfare.

Student councils operate under various organizational models. Some are representative-based, while others are modeled loosely after the United States Congress or the executive branch of the federal government of the United States, with elected positions such as president, vice president, secretary, and treasurer. Officers are typically elected by the student body, though eligibility requirements may apply. In primary school, councils often include one or two representatives per classroom, whereas many secondary schools elect officers by per grade level or school-wide.

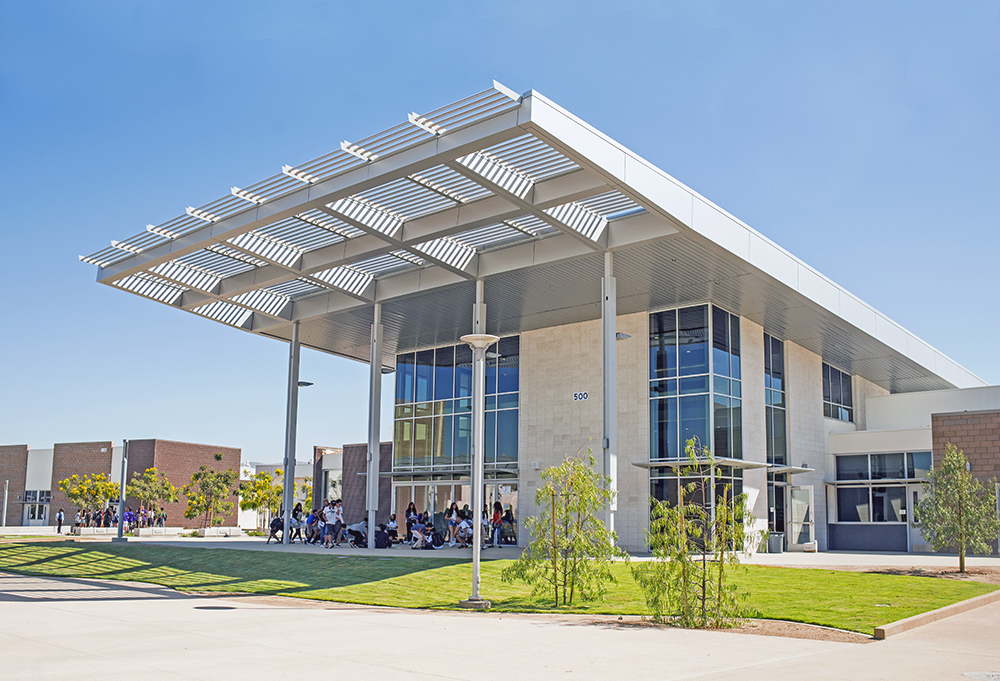
Student Union building at Portola High School (Irvine, California)

A student body president (also known as a school president or associated student body president) represents the entire student population across all grade levels and is generally responsible for broader leadership initiatives and school-wide coordination, often operating from a student center or common room.

== Class officers ==
Class officers represent students within a single class or grade level. Unlike student council officers, who address school-wide concerns, class officers focus on activities and issues specific to their cohort.

A class president commonly presides over class meetings, represents class interests to faculty or school administrators, organizes student activities such as school spirit, assemblies, student orientation, and fundraising events, and coordinates major events. Events such as school dances (sometimes Junior Prom), homecoming, prom or graduation. The term of office is typically one academic year, with the option of re-election in subsequent years.

The class secretary is a position in student councils responsible for recording notes. They help the class leader record information on the class members, including class attendance and enrollment forms. The class secretary is supposed to pay close attention to the details and is required to have strong communications skills. Most educational institutions that hold a class secretary position also have a handbook for the class secretary. The class secretary helps ensure that all duties and meetings run smoothly.

=== Structure by school level ===
In elementary schools, student councils may include positions such as president, vice president, secretary, treasurer, sergeant of arms, historian, fundraising officer, and grade-level representatives. Roles may be assigned or elected and often reflect seniority by grade.

Middle school and secondary school student councils generally exercise greater independence and responsibility. They are often governed by a written constitution and overseen by a faculty sponsor, typically a teacher. Unlike collegiate student governments, most do not maintain a judicial branch.

=== Faculty advisor ===
Most student councils and class governments are supported by a faculty advisor, a faculty member who serves as a liaison between students and school administration. Sometimes a member of administration themselves, such as in secondary education, an assistant principal of student activities (or one assigned to ASB) provides administrative oversight for the student government. Advisors ensure that council actions comply with institutional policies while allowing students to retain primary leadership responsibility.

Key duties include managing student behavior, enforcing the code of conduct, serving as the steward for student body funds to ensure fiscal responsibility and proper documentation, scheduling and supervising extracurricular events like dances and graduation ceremonies, overseeing election processes for student officers, and evaluating club and class advisors. This position ensures all student-led events are safe, properly funded, and coordinated within the master school calendar.

== Regional and national structures ==
Student councils can have institutional power, as in Spain and Germany, where they serve as a political force that mediates between students and educational institutions, or they can be elected or non-elected clubs dedicated to organising fund-raisers and events. Student councils can join larger associations, like in the United States, the National Association of Student Councils. In Canada, the Canadian Student Leadership Association coordinates the national scene, and in the United Kingdom an organization called Involver provides training, support, and coordination for the nation's student councils

A functional equivalent of student body president in some systems, such as the UK, Australia, and India, is the school captain. A school captain is a student appointed or elected to lead the student body of a school, usually in their final year. They are usually supported by two vice-captains and a vice captain serving as Chair of SRC. The role is similar to a student body president in the United States and represents students in interactions with faculty and the wider community. School captains are mainly found in British Empire legacy school systems: Australia, Canada, New Zealand, South Africa, India, etc. In some schools, the captain may also hold the position of head prefect. The role is less common in the United Kingdom, where Head Boy and Head Girl positions are more typical. Captains are often recognized by a badge or other symbol of office. They are usually responsible for representing the school at events and will make public speeches.

=== Bulgaria ===
In Bulgaria, most of the universities have a student council, regulated by law and the regulations of each university.

=== Canada ===
In Canada, the student council is used for helping the school with special events and planning other events. Student councils in Canada also act as a body to advocate for student issues like tuition.

=== Chile ===
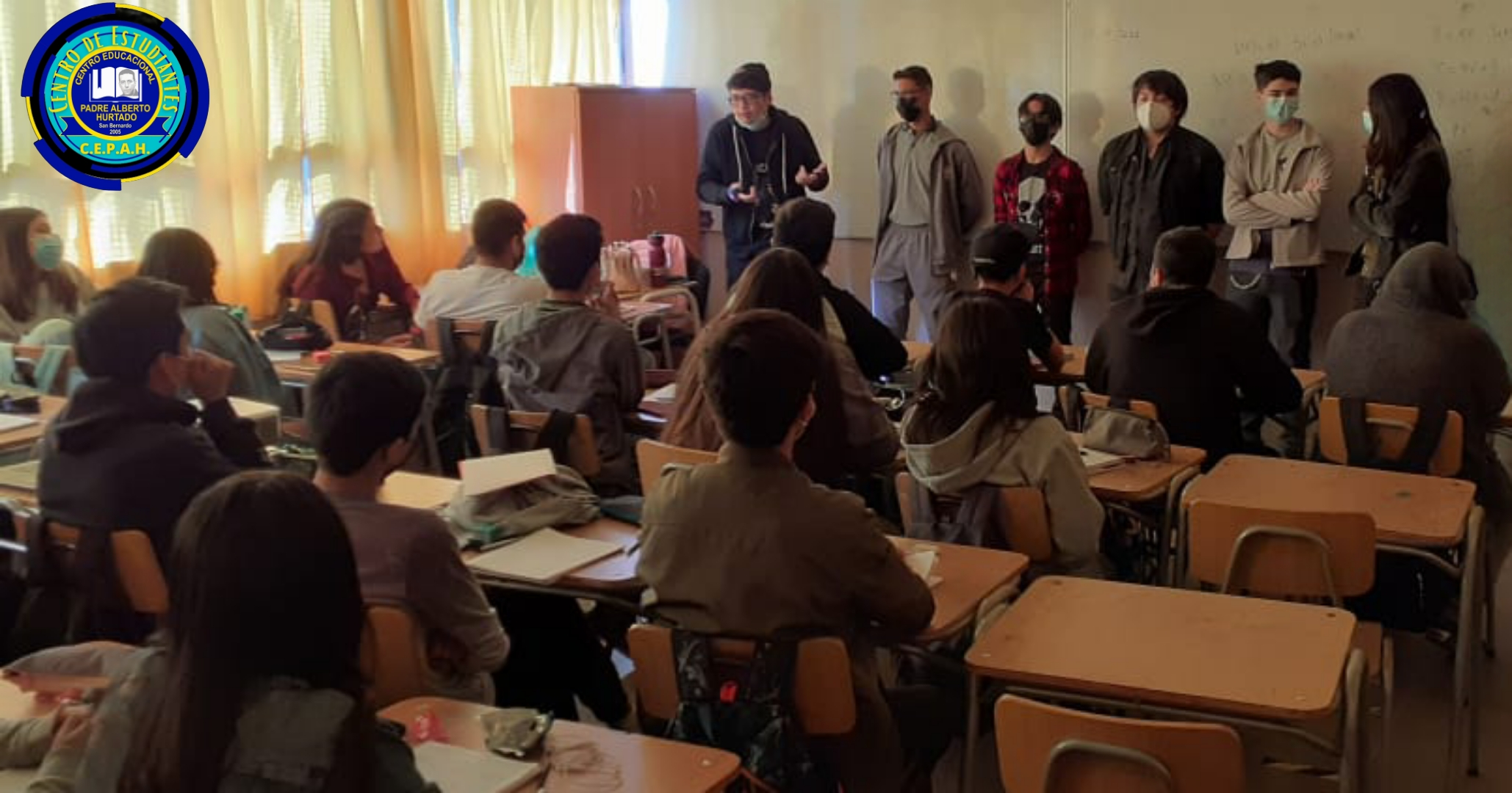
Students' centres are democratically elected yearly.

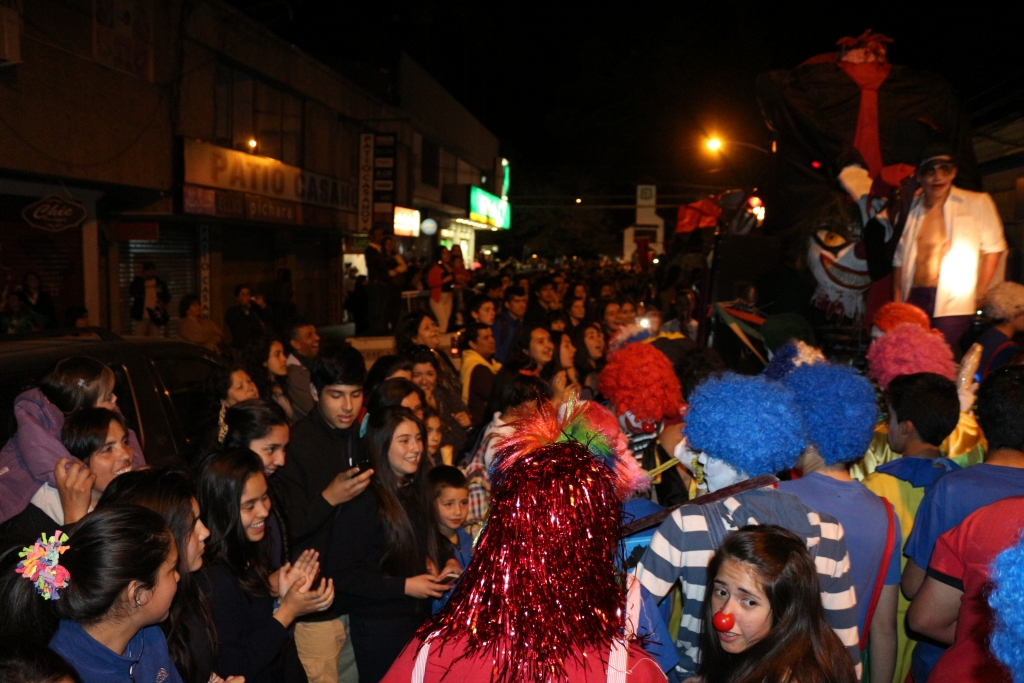
Students' centers often co-organise activities and celebrations with their schools' administrations.

In Chile, the centros de alumnos (English: students' centres), also known as centros de estudiantes, are student organisations present in all the country's high schools and most of the primary schools. Their creation was contemplated since the enactment of the Ministry of Education of Chile's Supreme Decree #524 of 19 April 1990, although they have existed long before. Students' centers' goals are described by the ministry, in their Ayuda Mineduc website, as "serving their members, based on the purposes of the school and subscribed to the rules of student organization, as a way to develop their reflective thinking, critical judgment, and their will of action; to educate [the students] for the democratic life, and to prepare them to participate in the social and cultural changes."

The centros de alumnos have the right to participate in the school council, and to actively participate, convoke a general assembly, in which all the students of their schools have to participate, and convoke meetings with the directors of the different classes of their high schools or schools.

=== China ===
In China, the head of a class is commonly known as the "class representative" (班代表) or "class leader" (班長). Additionally, there are often designated student officers for each academic subject.

=== Finland ===
Secondary high schools, lukio, and vocational schools in Finland have student councils. They incorporate all the students of the institution, but their status is marginal, both locally and nationally. Legislation demands that they should be heard in all matters related to education in the institution, but this is often not done.

=== Germany ===
Student representation is very important in the German school system. Each state in the Federal Republic of Germany has its own peculiarities in the system, but they are, by and large, similar. Although education in Germany is a matter for the federal states, there is a Federal Student Conference where all state student councils can elect delegates to participate and exchange views on nationwide problems that arise in education. Every school in Germany has a student council. In the case of major changes that affect school life, the student council must agree. According to the student council, every district or larger city has a District student council/City student council. At the municipal level, these councils deal with the school authorities and with the individual institutions, such as school offices, etc. Above this, there is a state student representation in each state, where delegates from each district/city of the respective state come to exchange ideas. This body is granted extensive rights, such as a budget of between €40,000 and €70,000 for material costs, but is also obliged to consult with the Ministry of Education when important decisions are made.

Schools in parts of Europe such as in Germany and Austria, secondary schools use the term "student speaker" ("Schülersprecher" in Germany, "Schulsprecher" in Austria) for schoolwide student representatives and "class representative" ("Klassensprecher") for classroom representatives.

=== Greece ===
In Greece, student representation is considered the cornerstone of democracy. All public secondary schools have a student council which consists of 15 members: a president, a vice-president, a secretary, and 12 equal voting members. Additionally, all classes have a separate student council which consists of 5 members: a president, a secretary, a treasurer, and 2 equal voting members.

By law, every school should elect these councils around a month after the start of the school year. The 5-member councils for each class are elected first, and about a week later, the 15-member school council is elected.

As of 2024, these councils don't play a role in school life. Their role is mostly to give suggestions to the school staff about the school and excursions, with no guarantee of them accepting their suggestions. In recent years, the votes of the 15-member councils have been used by students to close a school for a few days because of a dispute the students have with the staff (κατάληψη). These councils, and especially the 5-member class councils, have mostly educational value in teaching students how to vote, and actual power is none or very limited. On average, a 15-member school council will convene less than five times in a school year, and a 5-member class council less than three.

=== Hong Kong ===
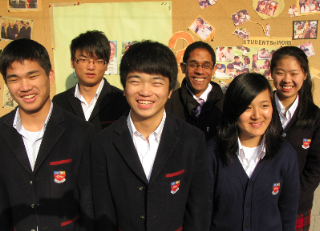
Ningbo Zhicheng School International Student Council 2011

In Hong Kong, some secondary schools have student councils, while some have Students' Unions. Student councils are directly elected by the student population and are formed by the winning cabinet. A hierarchical structure is maintained, with positions like Secretaries/Coordinators for internal and external affairs, Treasurer, Vice-chairpersons, and chairperson. Student councils represent the student body, organise events, and provide welfare for students.

=== India ===
In India, student councils are rare in elementary and middle schools. They are established in many secondary and higher secondary schools and are most commonly instituted in universities.

Student councils in India may be elected, nominated, or selected after an interview (or written examination or both). In universities, they are elected by ballot.

=== Indonesia ===
Emblem of OSIS

The student councils in Indonesia are officially formed by the government and are called OSIS (abbreviation of Indonesian: Organisasi Siswa Intra Sekolah, Intraschool Organization of Students). OSIS, introduced in 1970, is legally mandated to exist in all junior high schools and senior high schools. OSIS organizes the school's extracurricular activities such as music shows and art gallery (pentas seni/pensi). Every year, the committee, which usually consists of teachers and former student council members hold a selection process to admit students who meet qualifications to join OSIS, while the president is voted by students of the school. In some practices, the teachers can also vote depending on their own regulations.

=== Iran ===
In Iran, each November since 1997, elementary, secondary, and high school students at each school in the nation elect between 5-14 Student Council members, who act as the main medium of communication and debate between the student body and school officials. The size of the Council at each school depends largely on the class size and school policies. Student councils in Iran mainly promote interpersonal and leadership skills, constructive debates between school officials and the students, and the organization of school activities and field trips.

The student council bodies of the schools, cities, regions, and the national parliament are the same and include a president, a vice-president, a secretary, and some main members. There is also a "Student council of the Provinces " from among the presidents of the City Student Councils, and the presidents of these councils, who are 9th-grade or high school students, are several boys and girls who are representatives of their Provinces students in the "National Student Parliament".

Each province has between two and four girl and boy representatives, who are officially and legally responsible for leading and addressing the problems of students in their Provinces and improving the education system. The members of the "Student Parliament" (also called Student Council) in Iran are elected for a period of two years. During this period, they have at least two official sessions in the main parliament of the country with the presence of the Minister of Education, to whom they can express their demands and suggestions.

=== Ireland ===
Since 1998 in Ireland, there has been sustained development of student councils in post-primary schools. In 2008, the Irish Second Level Students' Union was founded as the National Umbrella body to organise and coordinate the national campaign efforts of the student councils. The Union is also a member of OBESSU. Schools and staff are advised to assist the creation and the development of a student council under section 27 of The Education Act 1998.

=== Israel ===
Israel's national student and youth council (Hebrew: מועצת התלמידים והנוער הארצית) is an elected body representing all youth in Israel since 1993. Representatives are elected democratically from district youth councils. (Jerusalem, Tel Aviv, Center, Haifa, Arab sector, South, North, and the regional schools). The council comprises youth from the different sectors: religious, secular, Jewish, Arab, Druze, and a Bedouin representative. The National Youth Council representatives mediate between Government decision makers and the Youth representatives. They participate in the various "Knesset" (the Israeli parliament) committees: Education, Internal Affairs, Violence, Drugs, and Science. Youth representatives participate in committees dealing with youth-related issues such as: children's rights, violence, delinquency, and youngsters at risk - cut off from mainstream youth. Youth representatives also participate in discussions concerning matriculation examinations, discussing a national project on school trips, and delegations. Youth representatives are invited by high officials, ministers, and even the president and officials from foreign countries. Israel's national student and youth council is the first youth council in the world to enact student rights legislation. In 2006, graduates of Israel's national student and youth council founded an association named Bematana. The association's mission is to promote young leaders who are elected as representatives in student and youth councils in Israel. In 2012, Israel's national student and youth council held the International Youth Leadership Conference under the slogan. "Take The Lead!"

=== Italy ===
In Italy, the rappresentante d'istituto (institute representative) is an elected student who serves on the school's Consiglio d'Istituto (Institute Council), the main governing body of a secondary school. This role was introduced by the 1974 delegated education laws. These representatives attend council meetings, voice student concerns, and may organize assemblies or activities. They also coordinate the Comitato studentesco (student committee), made up of class representatives. Elections are held annually, typically in October or November. Students vote using the D'Hondt method, and two or four representatives are elected, depending on school size. Terms last one year.

=== Japan ===
The class system was introduced in Empire of Japan in 1885 (Meiji 18). It began to be implemented in large schools in the early 1880s. After the 1989 United Nations Convention on the Rights of the Child, discussions on student participation and opinion rights increased, involving lawyers, educators, and forming tripartite councils among schools, guardians, and students. Student councils' roles expanded, although some declined. 宮下 与兵衛 (2016). 高校生の参加と共同による主権者教育. かもがわ出版. ISBN 978-4-7803-0834-1.

Based on alumni associations which were existed as high-level organizations of extracurricular activities, student councils were added to Japanese schools after World War II. In Japanese schools, students in a class stay together as a cohesive set in the same homeroom for most of the day. Each class has one or more elected representatives who report to the student council. The student council consists of members who are elected by the student body. The council is often responsible for organizing events such as the culture festival, sports day, and class field trips.

=== Malaysia ===
In Malaysia, public secondary school student councils are usually run and managed by the school's prefects, also known as the Prefectorial Board. They act as the representatives between the students and the teachers. Some schools also have the prefects managed by a few groups of select teachers known as disciplinary teachers, or directly under the head teacher of discipline. Depending on each school's individual system, the Prefectorial Board either has open recruitment for any students interested but requiring them to undergo a year's worth of training and probation, direct recruitment via recommendations made by either teachers or senior prefects (usually students who show excellence in their studies and activities), or both. Some schools have the best students from each class selected to be prefects. Positions such as head prefect (the equivalent of student president), assistant head prefect, secretary, and treasurer are usually elected by students. Some schools have an internal election among prefects or have the teacher select a few possible candidates for such roles before letting the students vote. These positions form the high council or high committee. Secretaries and treasurers sometimes come with assistants, either appointed by the position holder, the committee, or they are voted just like the other members. Some schools will have additional positions, such as 'Head of Discipline' or 'Head of Statistics', who themselves have a committee of their own to manage different aspects of the school.

Those not part of the high committee are then given roles and positions based on their merit and skills to form different committees to oversee different aspects of the school, such as club activities, moral enforcement, school events, or even paperwork management. While a prefect's main job is to enforce discipline and be the eyes of the school, those with roles and positions have to carry out their specific duties while managing their responsibilities as prefects. These committees are headed by the high committee members, who also have to manage the students and the school. Sometimes, class monitors (who also act as class reps) take part in discussions and meetings held by prefects to better engage with the students. They may also be included as part of the committees, but as normal students. Each classroom also has its own committee consisting of roles such as class monitor, assistant monitor, treasurer, and secretary to manage things in their own classes.

While prefects enforce the school rules and assist the teachers, they also act as the voice of students when it comes to issues concerning the well-being of students. They essentially have full influence and control over school policies. However, as school laws are created by the Malaysian Ministry of Education, the prefects have no power to amend laws.

Prefects in Malaysian schools can be identified by their distinctive blue uniform that makes them stand out from normal students. Primary schools also have a prefectural board on a much smaller scale.

=== Myanmar ===
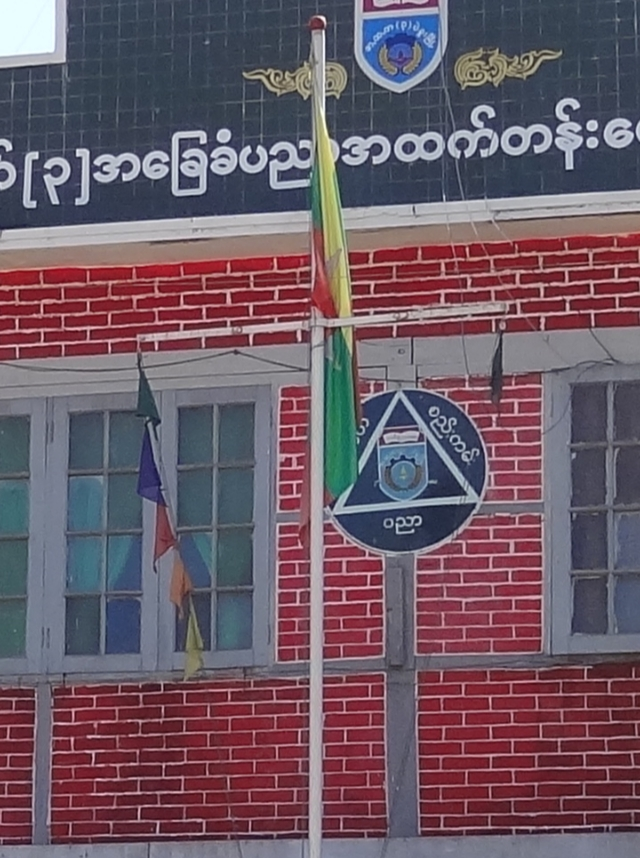
Flag pole of a school in Myanma

School Council (Burmese: ကျောင်းကောင်စီ; abbreviated as SC) is an auxiliary service in Basic Education Schools and Education Colleges in Myanmar. It is the system of a teacher-student joint council with House system under the control of the government, in which all the students and teachers of a school or an education college have to participate, and the principal takes the highest position. The School Councils are formed under the order and regulation of Myanmar government's Ministry of Education, Department of Basic Education (DBE). The School Council (SC), the Parent-Teacher Association (PTA) and the Board of Trustees (BOT) usually manage the educational activities of their school at the school level of management and administration of DBE. School Councils also serve as a body for special communication between teachers and students within schools. The School Council had been mandatorily formed since Ne Win's reign with various structures in each school. Founded in 1964, the original purpose was to organize school children for the agenda of Burmese Way to Socialism. In June and July 2013, school councils were reorganized, with many activities and the aim to build Democracy inside classes and schools. The Burma Socialist Programme Party wanted to organize young people and their first emphasis was the field of education where school children had already been unified. Thus, in 1964, the Department of Students and Youth Affairs was established, which then formed school councils in every school. The Ministry of Education planned to reorganize the school councils before July 2013. The reorganized school council would have a general secretary, the houses' leaders, and even student representatives. The Ministry hoped that the school council would help students to learn leadership skills and improve their personality, and would strengthen the unity of students.

In the first week of a new academic year, students are allocated to five houses (Burmese: အသင်း, lit. 'team/association'), either randomly, by drawing lots, or by the management of the teacher. Each of the houses is named after a king or a hero and has a colour. But there is no specific uniform for houses. The houses are often called informally by their colours. Members of each of the five houses usually have to do duties, such as sweeping, on each weekdays that their house is assigned. School council activities provide students the opportunities to take part in enhancing school quality and making collective decisions about school developments. Originally, there were only four houses, but a new house was added later to become five houses.

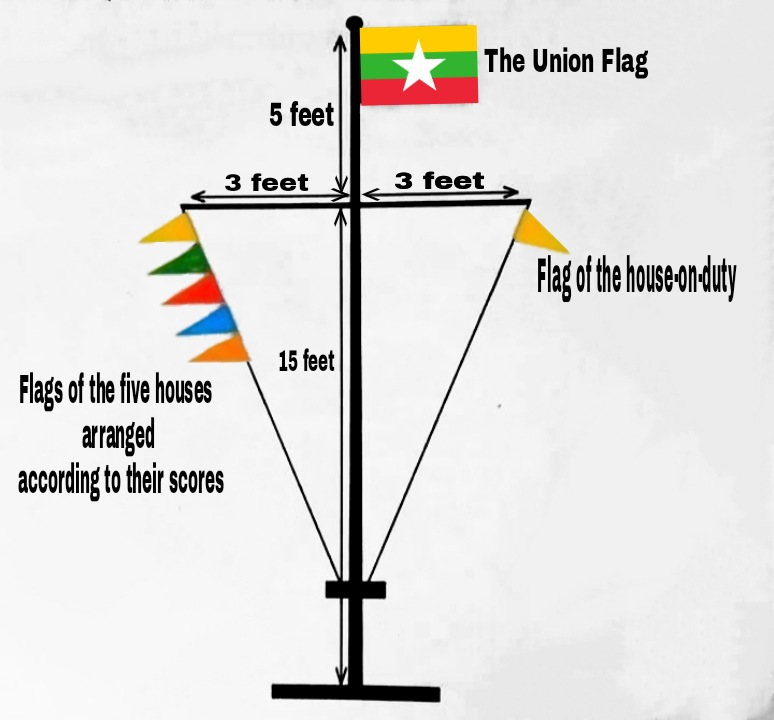
Typical size of flag pole of schools in Myanmar

The five houses of a School Council
အသင်းအမည် (House name)	အရောင် (Colour)	တာဝန်ကျနေ့ (Duty-day)
အနော်ရထာ (Anawyahta)	လိမ္မော်ရောင်(Orange)	Monday
ကျန်စစ်သား (Kyansittha)	အဝါရောင်(Yellow)	Tuesday
ဘုရင့်နောင် (Bayinnaung)	အစိမ်းရောင်(Green)	Wednesday
အလောင်းဘုရား (Alaungphaya)	အနီရောင်(Red)	Thursday
‌ဗန္ဓုလ (Bandula)	အပြာရောင်(Blue)	Friday

During the three Vassa months (ဝါတွင်း), all the Basic Education schools (both public and private) close on Uposatha Days (ဥပုသ်နေ့); 8th Waxing Days, Full Moon Days, 8th Wanning Days and New Moon Days on Myanmar Calendar; and open on Saturdays. In this case, the house assigned on the Uposatha Day is assigned on the following Saturday as substitution. Usually, the houses have to compete with one another in many aspects and there is an award system. The flags of the houses are flown on the right side of the bar attached to the flag pole, with the flag of house that has highest score at the highest position and the flag of house that has lowest score at the lowest position.

==== Structure ====
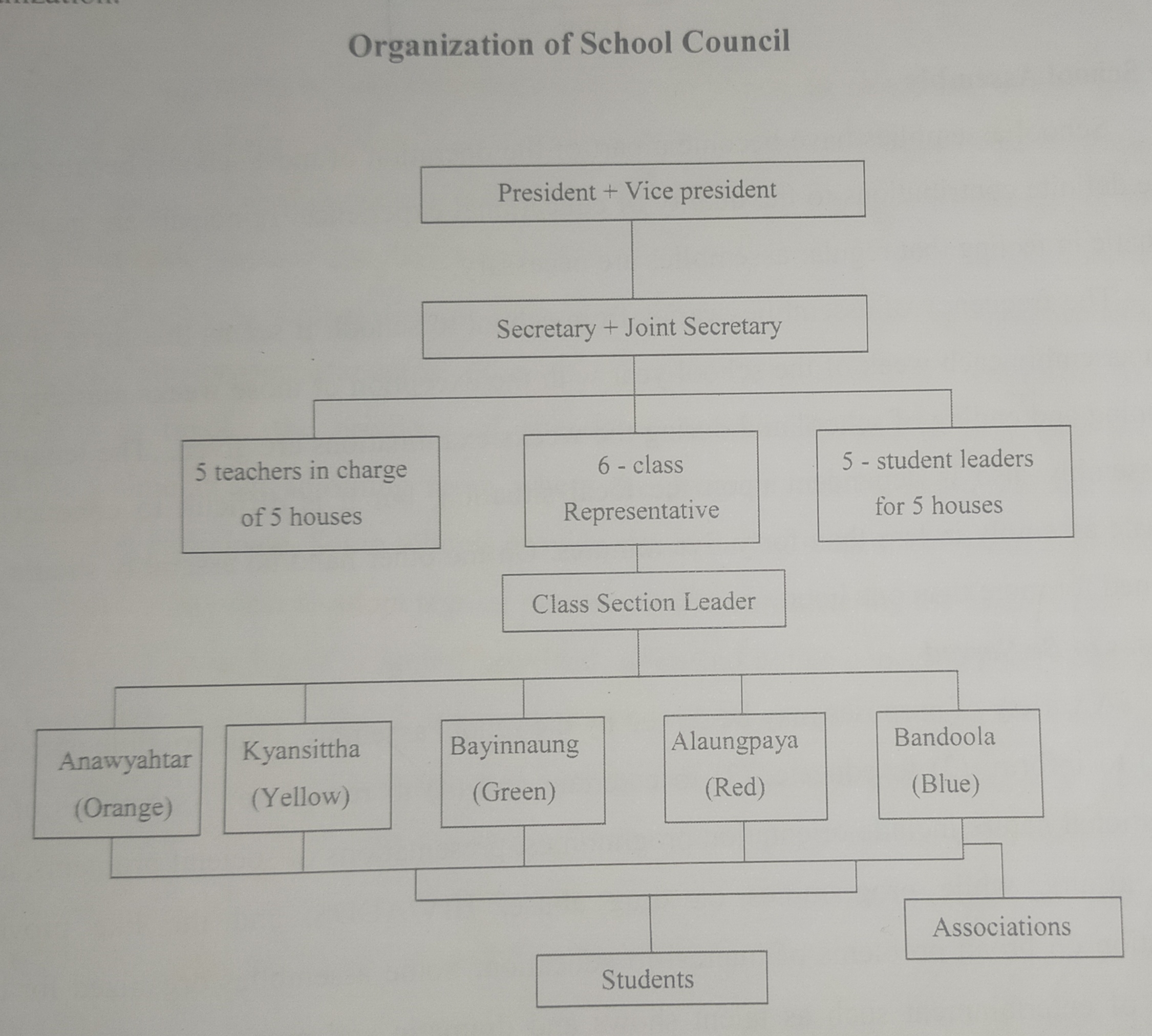
Organization of school council

The School Council of a school is formed by all the students and teachers of that school, led by an executive committee with elected students and teachers, and a non-elected president, the principal. The Basic Education Law grants students the right to participate in the school council and educational development associations in basic education schools. The five houses of the School Council are formed in every class of every standard of the whole of a school. In each classroom, a leader is elected for each house in the class, and a class leader is elected for the whole class. Among those leaders of each house, the representative of the house for the whole school is elected, and the class houseleader'sr duty of him/her, which, is transferred to the student who got second majority vote in the election for class house leader.

All the teachers of the whole school have to become the members of the five houses in such a way that every house has an equal number of teachers, and each teacher-in-charge of each house is elected by voting. No teacher is allowed to take both the position of Teacher-in-charge of a House of the School Council and the position of Teacher-in-charge of the Education and Development Team of the School.

Different schools have different numbers of students, and so they have different numbers of classes in each standard. But the number of members in the executive committee of the School Council of a Basic Education Middle School or a Basic Education High School is fixed, and the executive committee is not formed in the School Council of a Basic Education Primary School. Also, even in a BEMS or a BEHS, the executive committee members are not elected from primary school standards. A Basic Education Middle School has Kindergarten to Eighth Standard, but the students from Kindergarten to Fourth Standard can not be elected to the executive committee.

School Council Executive Committee of a Basic Education Middle School
Positions and holders	Number
President – the principal or headmaster or headmistress	1
Vice-president – a teacher	1
Secretary – a student	1
Joint-secretary - a student	1
Teachers in charge of 5 houses	5
Student leaders of 5 houses	5
Class Representatives	4
Total	18 members

A Basic Education High School has Kindergarten to Tenth Standard, but the students from Kindergarten to Fourth Standard can not be elected to the executive committee.

School Council Executive Committee of a Basic Education High School
Positions and holders	Number
President – the principal or headmaster or headmistress	1
Vice-president – a teacher	1
Secretary – a student	1
Joint-secretary - a student	1
Teachers in charge of 5 houses	5
Student leaders of 5 houses	5
Class Representatives	6
Total	20 members

=== Norway ===
All schools in Norway are required by law to have a student council elected by the students. The aim of student council is usually to improve their school through encouraging social, cultural, and other extracurricular events in the local community. The student councils in Norway are governed by a Board of Directors which is either elected directly or by the student council.

=== Pakistan ===
In Pakistan, Student Councils are being introduced in many Private and Public Schools. Student councils are playing an important role in Pakistani schools.

A Student council in Pakistan may be elected, nominated, or selected after an interview or written examination or both, but can also be based on academic behaviour or discipline. Sometimes council members are elected based on general elections, and if the teacher voted on a good student based on records and grades.

=== Philippines ===
The Philippines has a complex student union with different names such as student government, the term used in all public secondary schools and some of the universities and/or colleges and student council for most of the colleges/universities. The Learner Government Program (LGP) is the Philippines' program for learner governments in elementary schools and learner governments in secondary schools of the Department of Education, under the Office of the Assistant Secretary for Operations. It is the foremost co-curricular student organization authorized to implement pertinent programs, projects, and activities in Philippine schools as mandated by the Department of Education.

The Center for Students and Co-Curricular Affairs (CSCA) was established in 1996 in order to further facilitate co-curricular work of student councils in the country and mold them to be better leaders. In 2003, the Supreme Student Governments were institutionalized starting with the establishment of the National Federation of Supreme Student Governments (NFSSG) with David Maulas of Bohol as its first National Federation President elected during the 1st National Leadership Training for Student Government Officers (NLTSGO). An institutionalized Constitution and By Laws of the Supreme Student Governments were enforced through a Department Order No. 43, s. 2005, then revised in 2009 as per Department Order No. 79, s. 2009.

The revived National Federation officers were elected in SY 2020–2021, with Ken Bien Mar Caballes from the CARAGA Region. Since then, the NFSSLG elections, in which all Regional Federation Presidents (RFSSLG Presidents) participate, have been held annually, with the two most recent elections conducted during the 2023 and 2024 Learners Convergence Philippines (LearnConPH). The presidency was subsequently held by Bienesto Fidel Junio (Region I - Ilocos Region, SY 2021–2022), Rjhay Mulimbayan-Reyes (Region IV-A CALABARZON, SY 2022–2023), and Ma. Cassandra Austria (NCR, SY 2023–2024). The current president for SY 2024–2025 is Prince Rosher Iriño from Region VII - Central Visayas.

In 2014, through DepEd Order No. 47, s. 2014, the Constitution and By-Laws of the Supreme Pupil Governments in elementary schools and the Supreme Student Governments in secondary schools across the country were unified. This marked the year when the Supreme Pupil Governments were institutionalized. However, in 2023, the Department of Education, through the Office of the Undersecretary for Operations, released the Interim Guidelines of the Learner Government Program, changing the SPG/SSG name to SELG/SSLG. Currently, the program is now under the Office of the Office of the Assistant Secretary for Operations (OASOPS), through the Bureau of Learner Support Services - Youth Formation Division (BLSS-YFD).

==== Notes ====
^{a} SGP - Student Government Program; SELG - Supreme Secondary Learners Government; SSLG - Supreme Secondary Learners Government
^{b} All bona fide students enrolled are considered as members of the SPG/SSG [SELG/SSLG] as stated in Article IV, Section 1 of the Constitution and By-Laws of the Supreme Pupil Government and Supreme Student Government in Elementary and Secondary Schools.

=== Singapore ===
In Singapore, many secondary schools have a student council, which provides a medium for communication between the students and the school administration, a form of student welfare, and an important event-organising body. Some secondary schools name their student council like "Student Leader Board" or "Student Leader Committee", etc. They are usually nominated by peers and subsequently elected based on the decision of the teachers overseeing the student leader body. In Junior Colleges, student councils serve a greater purpose than their younger counterparts. They are given more autonomy in their planning and execution of school events.

=== Spain ===
Most Spanish universities have student councils, which are regulated by law. Some of the basic points are the 24% of student representation on the board. Each university council is elected by universal suffrage of the students.

These are organised by regional students councils such as CEUCAT in Catalonia. There is a national students council called CEUNE, which is the interlocutor between the Universities Ministry and the university students.

=== United Kingdom ===
Student Councils (sometimes Student Voice, School Council, Student Parliament, and Student Union) at the secondary school level are usually bodies nominated by teachers in state schools (and public and private schools without a house system). There are some regional networks between the representative bodies.

Many UK secondary schools operate a Student Council or similar body, typically composed of elected representatives from each form group and supported by members of the senior leadership team. In some schools, students in Year 12 may apply or be nominated for senior student leadership roles. These may include a Head Boy and Head Girl, along with their deputies, collectively referred to as the Heads of School. Other schools may appoint a School Captain and Vice-Captain, either as alternative or additional titles. The specific structure and responsibilities of these roles vary by institution.

Selected students in the final year may also serve as prefects. Prefect systems differ across schools but often include roles such as Senior Prefect, Welfare Captain, and various specialist positions covering areas like sport, co-curricular involvement, public relations, or community service. Some schools maintain a Student Representative Council (SRC) made up of elected students. Peer support schemes are also common, where older students—often from Year 10—are assigned to help younger students, particularly those new to the school in Year 7.

Furthermore, in England, some Student Councils maintain quite a hierarchical structure: the Representatives at the bottom, followed by the Secretary, Treasurer, Vice-chairman, and Chairman. This latter position is arguably the most important as it is down to this one person to run and organise the council, ensure relevant topics are discussed and—when necessary—remove members.

In Wales, the School Councils (Wales) Regulations 2005 made the establishment of School Councils a statutory requirement for all maintained primary and secondary schools in the country. The regulations also require that Councils meet regularly, that members of the School Council are elected by fellow pupils by means of a secret ballot, and that the School Council can nominate up to two of their number to serve as associate members on the school's Board of Governors.

In universities, the student council is the apex body of the students and members are elected in systematicvotings. In many universities, it also functions as an umbrella parliament for students' unions from different institutes.

=== United States ===
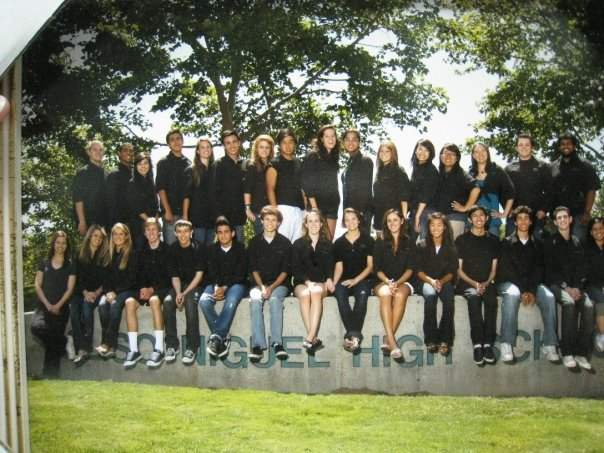
Aliso Niguel High School ASB 2007-2008

Associated student body organizations in the United States are often similar to others. In most educational systems, the council is considered to be an elective/club of individuals working for unity on their campuses. The club fundraises, supports students, and hosts events such as dances.

In California, public schools that receive state or federal funding are required to establish a School Site Council (SSC), composed of parents, teachers, students, school administrators, and other staff. The SSC develops and monitors a school site plan, aligns the budget with categorical funds, and recommends the Single Plan for Student Achievement to the school board.

The SSC president, who may be a student, is elected by council members and can serve alongside a class president or student body president. Similar councils exist in other states, including Texas (Site-Based Decision-Making Committees), Kentucky (School-Based Decision-Making Councils), and Illinois (Local School Councils), among others.

== In popular culture ==
The stereotype of the class president has been featured prominently in books films, and television Common portrayals include the class president as a high-achieving, rule-following student—often either the socially popular figure or the academic underdog who unexpectedly claims the title. Since the early 20th century, the class presidency has also been used metaphorically in political allegory, including analogies for figures such as the president of the United States to roles for African-American women in the U.S. Congress.

In anime, manga, light novels, and video games set in school environments, student councils, and by extension, class presidents are frequently depicted, often wielding exaggerated levels of authority. These portrayals commonly reflect hierarchical structures or political satire within youth-centered storytelling.

Notable fictional characters who have held the title of class president include:

- Pedro Sánchez, played by Efren Ramirez, runs for class president in the film Napoleon Dynamite (2004).
- Zach Siler, played by Freddie Prinze Jr., is the popular jock and class president in the film She's All That (1999).
- Wilford "Wil C" Cardon, class president in the independent film The Rise of Number 45, produced by DJ Iggy.
- Jessie Spano, played by Elizabeth Berkley, is class president at Bayside High School in the television series Saved by the Bell.
- Ryoko Asakura serves as class president in the anime The Melancholy of Haruhi Suzumiya.
- Tracy Flick, played by Reese Witherspoon, runs for class president in the film Election (1999).
- Steve Holt, played by Justin Grant Wade, is class president of the high school attended by George Michael Bluth and Maeby Fünke in the series Arrested Development.
- Mizuki Kirimiya appears as the class president in the visual novel Yume Miru Kusuri.
- Courtney from Total Drama Island is mentioned as having run for class president before participating in the show.
- In My Hero Academia, both first-year classes of the U.A. Hero Course elect representatives. Class 1-A's president is Tenya Iida; Class 1-B's is Itsuka Kendo.
- Misaki Ayuzawa is the student council president in the anime and manga Maid Sama!.
- Medaka Kurokami is elected student council president in Medaka Box.
- Makoto Niijima student council president Persona 5.
- Angel Beats!
- Lisa's Substitute
- A Dark Rabbit Has Seven Lives
- After School Dice Club
- Angel Beats! 1st Beat
- Asobi Asobase
- Battle Spirits: Shounen Toppa Bashin
- Black Closet
- Block Z
- Bloom Into You
- Bully (video game)
- Bump Off Lover
- Castle Town Dandelion
- Characters of Persona 3
- Charlotte (TV series)
- Citrus (manga)
- Daily Lives of High School Boys
- Dragonar Academy
- Ebiten: Kōritsu Ebisugawa Kōkō Tenmonbu
- Flunk Punk Rumble
- GaruGaku
- Gokujō!! Mecha Mote Iinchō
- H2O: Footprints in the Sand
- Haganai
- Hanayamata
- Harriet the Spy (film)
- Hogwarts
- Home Movies season 2
- If Her Flag Breaks
- Jump Start (comic strip)
- K-On!
- Kanokon
- Kill la Kill
- Lady Penelope
- Le Péril jeune
- Love Lab
- Love Live! School Idol Project
- Love Live! Superstar!!
- Made (TV series)
- Majisuka Gakuen
- Makeover (Glee)
- Making Fiends (web series)
- Red Data Girl
- Missions of Love
- My Sister, My Writer
- My Wife Is the Student Council President
- Night of the Twisters (film)
- Omega Labyrinth
- Oresama Teacher
- Parfait Tic!
- Phantom Thief Jeanne
- Photo Kano
- Pretty Boy Detective Club
- Revolutionary Girl Utena
- Sabagebu!
- Sakura Trick
- See Me After Class
- Seitokai Yakuindomo
- Son of Interflux
- Sora no Manimani
- Stuart Farrimond
- The Adventures of Hello Kitty & Friends
- The Asterisk War
- The Girl Next Door (2004 film)
- The Secret Notes of Lady Kanoko
- To Heart 2: Dungeon Travelers
- Tropical-Rouge! Pretty Cure
- Tsuredure Children
- Twinkle Crusaders
- Vixens (manga)
- Wagamama High Spec
- Wayside: The Movie
- Why the Hell Are You Here, Teacher!? - Saya Matsukaze (松風 さや, Matsukaze Saya) student council president.^{Vol. 5}
- Yamada-kun and the Seven Witches - Urara Shiraishi, the ace student at the school.
- Election (1999 film) - American film with Reese Witherspoon and Matthew Broderick

== See also ==
- Honors student – Student recognized for achieving high grades or high marks in their course work
- Student voice – Perspectives and actions of students
- Student court – Judiciary of a student government
- Student prank – Mischievous trick played on someone
- School uniform – Standardized outfit worn by students of an educational institution
- School governor – Overseers of a school
