= The Twinkie Squad =

Book by Gordon Korman

- First edition
- Author: Gordon Korman
- Illustrator: Liam Schindler
- Language: English
- Genre: Children's novel
- Publisher: Scholastic Inc.
- Publication date: 1992
- Publication place: Canada
- Media type: Print (Paperback)
- Pages: 194
- ISBN: 0-590-45250-9
- OCLC: 30013779

The Twinkie Squad is a children's novel written by Gordon Korman published in 1992. The story follows the mis-adventures of Armando "Commando" Rivera, a feisty, popular basketball-obsessed hotshot who often gets in trouble with bullies and teachers; and Douglas Fairchild, the tall, pale son of a U.S. Ambassador, who claims to be from a small middle-eastern nation called 'Pefkakia' because he was born on a jet plane in its main airport during an emergency layover. The story is ostensibly set in Washington D.C.

== Plot ==
=== Beginning ===
Obsessed with sharing his 'exotic culture' which he himself is largely inventing, Douglas Fairchild appears eccentric and fails his classes, which leads him to be placed in a special needs support group, condescendingly referred to as "The Twinkie Squad" by most other students. The group is actually named the special discussion group and is led by Mr. and Mrs. Richardson who have degrees in counseling. Later, at lunch, Armando "Commando" Riviera, is playing basketball, and Doug is sitting on a nearby bench writing in his "Pefkakia journal" (actually a notebook filled with nothing but the word 'blah'). Commando throws the ball at Doug, which bounces and hits Douglas in the nose, causing a massive nosebleed. Commando's enemy, Kahlil, reports him to the Principal, who accuses him of deliberately attacking Doug; and when Doug denies that this is how the incident happened, the Principal carelessly assumes that Commando is bullying him into keeping quiet. Commando is suspended from the basketball team and is sentenced to a year in Doug's special needs group with other "defective" students. The Twinkie Squad includes Anita, who can't think up her own thoughts so she copies others; Yolanda, who is obsessed with movies; Gerald, who is incredibly shy; Ric, who is hyperactive and very jittery; and Dave, who has very low self-esteem.

Commando is also upset because his family has fallen on hard times, forcing his father to go back to school to earn a degree in accounting and take the necessary exams to become a CPA (certified public accountant).

=== The "Grand Knights" ===
Douglas meanwhile, is failing his classes even worse than before, causing Martin and Julia, the husband-and-wife duo that leads the support group, to discipline him. However, he is completely undeterred and makes two efforts to raise morale with his new friends, Pefkakian-style. His first effort is to give the ragtag group a new nickname, The Grand Knights of the Exalted Karpoozi, which he claims was a noble Pefkakian order named after the great Karpoozi river (in fact 'karpoozi' was a word he found in his alphabet soup). Commando is intrigued by the idea, and uses his charisma and popular "bad boy" reputation to help Douglas organize the "Grand Knights" into an actual club. But when he tries to market the group as a voluntary-membership club, and posts a cryptic sign-up sheet for the Grand Knights without any description, it becomes the coolest and most exclusive club on campus, especially when he actually has to post a rejection to the most popular girl in school, since he doesn't actually have the authority to admit new members to the Twinkie Squad.

=== Garlic Squid ===
Doug's second "morale raising" effort is to cook a fancifully made-up "traditional Pefkakian delicacy" for the Grand Knights. His choice is decidedly pungent: garlic squid with mango and banana; but this creates even WORSE problems; he attempts to prepare the dish in the school's Home Economics kitchen and hides the half-prepared garlic marinated squid in a hole in the ceiling when a class starts and it gets sealed before he can retrieve it. It's teamwork time: the Grand Knights of the Exalted Karpoozi have a mission to eliminate the stench of the rotting squid by any means necessary, including:

- using the class's pet gerbils to eat it (they'll supposedly eat anything, but even they run away from rotting garlic squid)
- cheap perfume that only sharpens and enhances the odor, causing the school to be closed until it dissipates
- Dr. Footsie, an industrial strength foot powder used by Olympic athletes, which contaminates the principal's office and accidentally clogs the school's toilets

While the school is closed, Doug and Commando help the other kids in the Twinkie Squad, who are not really mentally challenged but are very shy, shed their shame, rebuild their lives, and become more social.

Meanwhile, the school reopens but the rotting stench is still there; the Home EC room and the Principal's Office directly above it, are closed off and abandoned because the smell is so bad that it makes people's noses and eyes feel a painful burning sensation.

=== Pranks and Scandals ===
Doug sees that Commando is still being harassed by Kahlil, and is crushed at the prospect of not being able to play on the basketball team, so he thinks up a way to help him - as only a government diplomat's son could. He manages to steal a blank piece of paper from his father's office with the Surgeon General's signature on it, and typewrites a forged letter addressed to the Principal, testifying to Commando's innocence and calling for his reinstatement to the basketball team.

The Principal, shocked that the Surgeon General somehow knows Commando, and now forced to work out of the janitor's broom closet, is also baffled at what could be causing the horrible smell in the school, so he hires several "experts" to inspect the school:

1. A sewer gas expert - the principal figures they have a busted sewer main. The man tells him the school's sewer is in excellent order, and it's probably bad plumbing that's causing the problem.

2. A plumber brings his crew to inspect the school. They bang on pipes and cause a lot of noise and ultimately fail to find anything. The plumber guesses that the school probably has a dead animal trapped in the walls somewhere, and suggests that the Principal call the "District of Columbia Rat-catcher".

3. The rat-catcher shows up and brings several crewmen with x-ray screens to look for any suspicious creature hiding in the walls. The men disrupt classes several times to x-ray the walls, often repeatedly. However, as a squid has no bones, the dish that Douglas prepared doesn't show up on the x-rays. The Rat-catcher is stumped and tells the Principal that the next step is to close the school, demolish the walls, and find the carcass of whatever it is that's causing the stink. The Principal protests, and sends the rat-catcher away.

After this, students and parents are furious at the noisy disruptions in class caused by the plumber and the rat-catcher, and they are even more furious at the "Grand Knights" for not allowing their kids to join. They complain that the Grand Knights is a snobby, elitist club at school that's not letting anyone join. The Principal desperately asks the entire faculty about the identity of these "Grand Knights" and is shocked when Martin and Julia, the leaders of the special needs group, come clean that their "Twinkie Squad" is actually the real Grand Knights.

The Principal is then forced to open the "club" to every student that wants to join. Doug and Commando print up new fliers, with the sub-heading "NO REJECTIONS" and within a day the entire student body joins the club! Then at the very last moment, in a move pre-planned by Douglas and Commando, they and all the other original members of the special needs group declare that THEY are the leaders of the Grand Knights, and immediately resign, leaving the rest of the school as the shocked and dazed members of the Twinkie squad. The original members then get in a limousine (courtesy of Doug's father) and drive away, victorious.

=== Epilogue ===
Afterwards, Doug, Commando, and the rest of the Twinkie Squad sneak back into the school, break one of the roof panels in the Home EC room, retrieve the rotten squid, and try to bury it in the schoolyard when they are caught by a policeman patrolling the campus. He tries to arrest them, but at that moment, Ambassador Fairchild intervenes, explaining that his son was not a criminal. The cop is relieved; he believed the boys were burying decomposed human remains.

Commando's father passes his CPA exam and becomes an accountant. Then he and Ambassador Fairchild confront the Principal over his clumsy and prejudiced mishandling of the nosebleed incident. He is forced to admit that Commando is not a bully and apologize for interpreting an accident as a case of physical assault. He does, however, shock Mr. Fairchild by producing Doug's forged letter with the Surgeon General's signature.

Then Doug admits to Commando that he has bad grades because he wanted to show the world that he is different than his family, and that the entire Pefkakia act was made up. He also reveals that his binder, which he had appeared to be obsessively writing in all year, contained nothing but page after page of the word "blah". After Commando goes to his homeroom, Doug's father shows up with a gift of a flower pot full of "bullrushes" - a brown reed-like plant native to Pefkakia. He frolics in the bullrushes like a little boy, embarrassing himself but feeling young at heart. Then they go home and he tells his son that he had to apologize to the principal for him on account of the forged Surgeon General letter - which itself was probably a felony.

== In other novels ==
Pefkakia is mentioned in A Semester in the Life of a Garbage Bag, as the subject of a report by the ill-starred Jardine. King Phidor of Pefkakia is beheaded in a military coup, one day before the report is due.
