= The War with Mr. Wizzle =

1982 novel by Gordon Korman

The War With Mr. Wizzle
- First edition
- Author: Gordon Korman
- Cover artist: Rodrigo Moreno; Luis Borba; Photo-illustration by Yüksel Hassan (2003 version)
- Language: English
- Series: Macdonald Hall Series
- Genre: Adventure
- Publisher: Scholastic Canada Ltd.
- Publication date: 1982, 2003
- Publication place: Canada
- Media type: Print (Paperback)
- Pages: 205 (Not including the preview at the end)
- ISBN: 0-439-96902-6
- Preceded by: Beware the Fish
- Followed by: The Zucchini Warriors

The War With Mr. Wizzle is the fourth installment in the Macdonald Hall book series. Like all the other books in this series, this one was republished in 2003 with new cover art. This installment was given the modified title "The Wizzle War". Additionally, because the book deals largely with technological advancements and discusses computers and software, it was rewritten to reflect the abundance of technology today. For instance, in the 1982 version, the character Mr. Wizzle brings in a large mainframe-like computer known as the Magnetronic 515, which according to Elmer is the most modern computer an institution like Macdonald Hall could have. In the updated 2003 version, the abundance of computers in the school is present, but the character Mr. Wizzle comes up with, instead of a new computer, a new software program that he is determined to run everything with. The book was originally written in 1982 by Gordon Korman.

== Plot ==
Macdonald Hall starts off the year in a fix due to a new dress code, and Bruno, Boots, and the rest of the ensemble soon find out that a new assistant has arrived, Walter C. Wizzle - a strange man intent on instituting a new set of rules at the school. He institutes a dress code that is hated by the students, a demerit system for bad behavior, and schedules psychological tests for the students. Worst of all, he calls the institute in danger of becoming 'a dinosaur' for not keeping up with technological advancements, so he starts installing a new software program called WizzleWare (that he wrote himself) to handle all school and teaching functions. The school atmosphere becomes strict and restricted for everyone, including the teaching staff and Headmaster Sturgeon. The only person not standing for it is Bruno Walton, who starts up a committee against Wizzle and his new system, and with the gradual help of other students comes up with ways to remove Wizzle from the school. They write a free press newspaper, exchange his printer paper with toilet paper and napkins, and at night in the gym building they make a large comic Wizzle balloon. With the help of genius Elmer Drimsdale and a device he created (along with a convincing presentation supporting the fact that Wizzle's guest cottage is along a fault line), they give Wizzle earthquakes at night.

But the problems aren't only at Macdonald Hall - across the road at Scrimmage's Finishing School for Young Ladies, Miss Scrimmage hires a new assistant for herself, Miss Gloria Peabody - a former U. S. Marine who is as hated by the girls as Wizzle is by the boys. She turns the school into a military camp with her strict physical training exercises and morning calisthenics.

Both schools have their share of problems and both enact their own number of counter-attacks on the assistants. Eventually, Sturgeon, who loathes Wizzle himself, realizes what his students are doing and orders them to stop the harassment and disband the committee, even while he refuses Wizzle's advice to have Bruno expelled for his disrespectful behaviour (although the assistant is unaware of the true scope of the boy's resistance). However, Bruno and Cathy, from Scrimmage's, join their forces together as The Coalition, and get the idea to marry the two assistants off. Through romantic flirting and planned dinners, they actually manage to get them married, and the two schools turn back to normal.

== Characters ==
Bruno Walton He starts up the Committee, all the subcommittees, and then the Coalition with Boots and Cathy from Scrimmage's to get rid of Wizzle and then both Wizzle and Peabody.

Melvin "Boots" O'Neal Bruno's best friend who at first can't take Bruno's schemes anymore and leaves his committee in fear of getting in trouble (as with everyone else at the beginning).

Walter C. Wizzle The new educational assistant. He comes to Macdonald Hall from university with many ideas to revolutionize the way the school works with his ideas, for the sake of progress. His goal is to modernize Macdonald Hall as the school of the future with his software program and rules based on his psychological research. As a result of his teaching methods the school atmosphere becomes tense and rigid due to his dress code and the teachers don't like him, including the Headmaster, Mr. Sturgeon, who has an intense dislike of the man. The students won't tolerate him as long as he's at the school.

William R. Sturgeon The headmaster of Macdonald Hall. He is a firm but kind headmaster who privately harbors admiration for his students and is nicknamed the Fish due to his name and his "cold, fishy stare." He dislikes Mr. Wizzle's methods and demeanor right from the beginning, but still punishes the boys for their activities against Wizzle, becoming the anti-hero of the book. He later at the end punishes the boys for their activities and has them wash dishes until April as punishment.

Miss Scrimmage The headmistress of the girls' school across the road. Very old-fashioned, she hires an assistant who goes on to take over the school as a more strict physical education facility.

Miss Gloria Peabody An ex-marine from Fort Constitution (a marine training camp) who becomes Ms. Scrimmage's assistant. She enforces strenuous physical activities as punishments and has a very harsh personality. She enforces military-like activities like a march and war games.

Gavin Gunhold The name G. Gavin Gunhold makes an appearance in this book as a fictitious student used as a ploy to befuddle Wizzle. Gunhold was a poet from A Semester in the Life of a Garbage Bag. The name Gunhold has appeared in other works by Korman, as a marathon runner, the recipient of a diploma, and the namesake of a warehouse. On page 10, the character is called "C. Gavin Gunhold", but this is just a typo.
