= Born to Rock (novel) =

2006 novel by Gordon Korman

- Author: Gordon Korman
- Language: English
- Publisher: Hyperion
- Publication date: March 28, 2006
- Publication place: Canada
- English publication date: March 28, 2006
- Pages: 272
- ISBN: 978-0-7868-0920-2

Born to Rock is a 2006 novel by Gordon Korman.

== The Plot ==
This book centers on the life of 18-year-old teen Leo Caraway, a member of the "Young Republicans" group at his school. He discovers that his biological father is not the man he thinks he is, but a punk rocker named King Maggot (real name: Marion X. McMurphy). Leo's scholarship to Harvard University is revoked after "cheating" by helping a classmate. He joins Maggot's band, Purge, as a roadie, to convince Maggot to pay his tuition. He has many adventures working as a roadie. Further on in the novel, however, he discovers that King Maggot is not in fact, his biological father. It is instead Bernie, the man Leo considered up until that point to be his cousin. Even though Maggot is not his father he chooses to help because Bernie is an unfit father. Maggot pays for Leo's tuition money for Harvard university.
