= Ungifted =

2012 novel by Gordon Korman

- Ungifted cover
- Author: Gordon Korman
- Cover artist: Jonny Duddle
- Language: English
- Genre: Children's fiction
- Publisher: HarperCollins, Balzer + Bray
- Publication date: February 18, 2012; 14 years ago
- Publication place: United States
- Media type: Paperback, Hardcover, Audiobook
- Pages: 280
- ISBN: 978-0-06-174267-5
- Followed by: Supergifted

Ungifted is a 2012 children's novel by Gordon Korman, which contains 31 chapters and 280 pages. The story is told with chapters of alternating perspectives over the 2011-12 school year. The plot revolves around Donovan Curtis, a troublemaker who gets wrapped up in a major prank gone wrong. Due to an accident caused by the superintendent, Donovan gets sent to the Academy of Scholastic Distinction (ASD), a school for gifted and talented students. The rest of the novel is spent on Donovan avoiding being caught while helping the students of ASD through his own special gifts. Donovan avoids getting caught by driving the class robot (shown on cover) and providing a teacher (his pregnant sister Katie) for Human Growth and Development class, of which the students of ASD lacked, to prevent them from having to attend summer school.

A sequel, Supergifted, was released January 2, 2018. As of 2021, a television series adaptation is currently in the works and will air on Nickelodeon.

== Plot ==
Donovan Curtis considers himself ungifted (the opposite of gifted), instead being a prankster and troublemaker. One day, one of his pranks goes too far when he strikes a school statue of Atlas which disrupts an ongoing basketball game. Although no one is injured, the gym is destroyed, with repairs for the damage that was done to the gym being prohibitively expensive due to the statue’s foundry having gone out of business. The district superintendent, Dr. Schultz, who was at the game, catches Donovan red-handed. However, after he jots down Donovan's name, he accidentally adds it to a list of candidates for the Academy for Scholastic Distinction (ASD), a school for extremely gifted students.

Donovan expects the mishap and his escape from punishment will eventually be discovered and feels that he will cause more stress to his already stressed household. His older sister, Katie, is currently staying with them and is seven months pregnant. Katie's husband Brad is a Marine who is deployed in Afghanistan. Adding to the pressure, Katie's mother-in-law leaves Brad's dog, Beatrice, who seems to be ill (but was later revealed to be pregnant) and only takes a liking to Donovan. However, after Donovan learns of the error that is sending him to ASD, he is filled with joy by the mistake.

On his first day, Donovan meets his classmates, and while some seem to be annoyed by him (in particular, a girl named Abigail Lee) some take a liking to him, especially Chloe, a girl interested in normal things. While Donovan continues to hide in the academy, his teachers wonder if he really is gifted. Donovan joins Robotics, a class taught by his homeroom teacher Mr. Osborne ("Mr. Oz"), who are preparing for a robotics tournament. Donovan helps give their robot a name: Tin Man Metallica SquarePants. Donovan introduces his classmate Noah Youkilis, a skinny boy with a high IQ (206), to YouTube which proves to be addictive to Noah. Donovan also impresses his classmates by showing his talent controlling the robot with a joystick.

Eventually, Donovan learns his classmates will have to go to summer school for failing to take Human Growth and Development. To help them, he convinces his sister to teach his classmates, which eventually gets approved. Later, during a school dance at the academy, Donovan's Hardcastle friends, the two Daniels (Daniel Sanderson and Daniel Nussbaum), steal the robot. However, one of the perpetrators is thrashed by Noah, who had learned of professional wrestling via YouTube.

A little bit later, Donovan is told to go to the library to take a test, to which he feels nervous because if he fails it he could be kicked out. However, while taking the test, Donovan discovers that someone had hacked the computer and was taking the test for him. For this Ms. Bevelaqua interviews Donovan's classmates about the test. While interviewing Noah Youkilis she says that they could get expelled for cheating on the test, to Noah’s happiness as he doesn’t like being at ASD and would prefer to be at a normal school.

Later, as the team prepares for the robotics tournament, Dr. Schultz finds a video from Noah's YouTube channel "Youkilicious" and recognizes Donovan as the boy who destroyed the gym. He goes to Academy to Donovan's classroom and tells him that he's been expelled. Back at Hardcastle, Donovan begins to feel depressed and filled with guilt. Meanwhile, Chloe feels distraught and skips school to try and find him. There, she runs in the Daniels, whom she manages to convince to find Donovan and bring him to the tournament.

Later, on the day of the tournament, Donovan is taken out of school by the Daniels and Katie. There, he watches the ASD control Tin Man, though he doesn’t participate until Cold Spring Harbor (one of the opponent schools) attempts to cheat by shoving Tin Man with their robot. Angry, Donovan runs down to the ASD and takes over control, using Tin Man to assault Cold Spring Harbor’s robot, with Noah using a chair to crash down. In the chaos, Katie suddenly goes into labor.

Later at the hospital, Dr. Schultz reveals that ASD and Cold Spring had been disqualified, with a different school taking the trophy. However, ASD's team doesn’t care; they are more overjoyed over Cold Spring Harbor’s defeat. Katie’s baby is revealed to be a girl, overjoying Noah as he had predicted the baby would be male and is happy to be wrong for once. Schultz also counts the hospital visit as Human Growth and Development hours, saving the ASD class from summer school.

Soon, Donovan is surprised to see Noah at Hardcastle, and is shocked to hear that Noah took the blame for hacking his test and was expelled; the true culprit was Abigail Lee, who did it out of gratitude.

Noah and Donovan continue to take the ASD robotics class after school, working on a new robot they call “Heavy Metal”. The book ends with Donovan reflecting over the whole experience, saying that people who attended the tournament might question who caused the ASD robot’s rampage, adding that he’ll always know that it was him and “you don’t have to be gifted to know that”.

== Characters ==
- Donovan Curtis, the main protagonist. He is a self-described prankster and troublemaker who accidentally destroys his school’s gym after he struck an Atlas statue. Due to a series of mishaps, he is sent to a school for incredibly gifted students and makes friends with several of them. Over the course of the book, his influence spreads over the students.
- Noah Youkilis, another student. He is regarded as one of the brightest in ASD, but has issues with socializing. Donovan introduces YouTube to him, where he develops a fascination with pro wrestling. He takes the blame for hacking Donovan’s test as a way to leave ASD as he hates being so gifted and would rather be with normal kids.
- Chloe Garfinkle, another student at ASD. She is the first to openly recognize Donovan as a “normal student”, as she strived for any kind of non-gifted interaction.
- Abigail Lee, a student at the Academy for Scholastic Distinction (ASD). She has an overachieving, uptight personality and is annoyed by Donovan, having known him since elementary school. She later secretly hacks his test to stay in ASD as gratitude for saving the class from summer school.
- Kevin Amari, Latrell Michaelson and Jacey Halloran, 3 other students in ASD's robotics. Jacey in particular has a habit of spewing random facts and tidbits when under pressure.
- Daniel Nussbaum and Daniel Sanderson (The Daniels), Donovan’s best friends from Hardcastle. They are outwardly rude and condescending, with them purposely attempting to dismantle ASD’s robot at a school dance. However, they do care about Donovan.
- Katie Patterson (née Curtis), Donovan’s pregnant older sister. She is staying at her home while her husband Brad is deployed in Afghanistan. She has a sibling rivalry with Donovan, but does love her little brother. Her baby is born at the end of the story.
- Lieutenant H. Bradley (Brad) Patterson, Katie’s marine husband. He is deployed in Afghanistan during the story and makes a cameo in the end via a call by Noah.
- Tina Mandy Patterson, Katie and Brad's baby who is born at the end of the book. She is named after Tin Man Metallica SquarePants, ASD’s robot.
- Ms. Maria Bevelaqua, ASD’s math teacher. She suspects that Donovan is not what he is trying to appear as. She is the subject of a prank video by ASD’s robotics team, who use their robot to lift her skirt, much to her chagrin.
- Heather, Daniel Nussbaum’s love interest.
- Deidre, Daniel Sanderson’s love interest.
- Beatrice (the dog), a cinnamon Chow Chow who is given to Donovan’s family by his aunt Beatrice. At first she is believed to be dying due to her behavior, but is later revealed to be pregnant. She likes Donovan.
- Tin Man (the robot), a robot created by ASD’s robotics team for a robotics tournament. His name is a reference to Tin Man, Metallica, and SpongeBob SquarePants. At one point, his motor is damaged and replaced by one from ASD’s floor polisher.
- Mr. Kyle Osborne (“Oz”), the teacher of ASD’s robotics homeroom. He supports Donovan even though he ultimately proves to not be gifted.
- Dr. Alonzo Schultz, the superintendent. He catches Donovan after his prank, but subsequently forgets his name after an accident that sends Donovan to ASD. He also used to be the principal of Katie's high school.
- James Donovan, Donovan's dead relative. He is said to have been on the Titanic.

== Awards and achievements ==
- Winner of the 2014 Red Cedar Award (BC Young Readers' Choice)
- Short-listed for the 2015 Pacific Northwest Library Association Young Readers' Choice
- Short-listed for the 2013 Snow Willow Award (Saskatchewan Young Readers' Choice)
- Short-listed for the 2013 Canadian Library Association Book of the Year For Children
- Runner-up of the 2014 Manitoba Young Readers' Choice Award
- Commended for the 2013 Oregon Library Association Best 2020 Readers Award
- Commended for the 2013 Best Books for Kids and Teens, Canadian Children's Book Centre

== Reception ==
Ungifted has received positive reviews from School Library Journal, Voice of Youth Advocates (VOYA), ALA Booklist, the National Post, Publishers Weekly, New York Times Book Review, the Horn Book Guide, Children's Literature, Junior Library Guild, and Kirkus Reviews. School Library Journal described the story as "unpretentious and universally appealing". Booklist labelled the conclusion as "satisfying". New York Times wrote that the novel is "brisk, heartfelt and timely". Children's Literature described the story as "unique" and the novel as "easily read", "nice" and "safe". Children's Lit also recommended it for "middle school students who don't feel they belong" and as an "ideal selection for classroom study" with "well-developed" characters and "many layers of 'drama'". Voice Of Young Advocates praised the novel by describing Ungifted as "humorous", "quirky", and "feel-good". The novel was also praised as "a gem for readers looking for a story", and the plot as "touching, without being overly sentimental". VOYA recommended Ungifted for "middle school readers who are looking for a funny and quick read".
