= I Want to Go Home! =

Book by Gordon Korman

- First edition cover
- Author: Gordon Korman
- Cover artist: Rodrigo Moreno (2004 version)
- Language: English
- Series: Apple Paperbacks
- Genre: Adventure, children's book
- Publisher: Scholastic Canada Ltd.
- Publication date: 1981, 2004
- Publication place: Canada
- Media type: Print (Paperback)
- Pages: 188 ( 2014 version )
- ISBN: 0-439-96915-8

I Want to Go Home! is a children's novel by Gordon Korman, first published in 1981. It was republished, as with most of Korman's older books, in 2004 with a new cover and updated text.

== Main characters ==
Rudy Miller, the novel's protagonist, is a loner who is sent to camp against his wishes by his school's guidance department. Exceptional at virtually everything, he hates everything about camp and anything that has to do with sports. Very literal and logical, he, with his new friend Mike Webster, attempt to escape the island in an effort to return home, an action they both fail throughout the book (there is reference at the end to them eventually escaping a number of times, only to come back and try again.) Rudy has a little brother, Jeffery, who is remarkably like him.

Mike Webster is Rudy's best friend at camp. He shares much of the same attitude toward camp and sports in particular as Rudy does and laughs at all of Rudy's witty remarks. His laugh is very infectious and usually ends up making whole crowds laugh. He was sent to camp for getting high grades in school and considers that if this was his parents' idea of a reward, than he would've probably gotten into a lot more serious trouble if he had failed. Mike has a younger sister called Vicky.

Chip is Rudy and Mike's bunk counselor. Chip is peppy and cheery to begin with, but quickly becomes short-tempered and irritated due to Rudy's antics. He easily gets fed up with all of Rudy's constant remarks and escape attempts. He's usually the one who captures or foils Rudy and Mike's escape attempts or is the first one to figure them out. Despite Chip's constant vows to kill the two and fear of sounding like them, he is the only counselor who appears the most worried about them when they get lost. He defends Rudy from all the other counselors (including Head Counselor Frank) when they want to force Rudy to play on their teams in order to win camp championships against other camps.

Harold Greene is Rudy and Mike's enemy. Sneering and smart-mouthed, Harold constantly puts down, makes remarks, or makes fun of both Rudy and Mike for not participating in anything and generally being different. Harold refers to both Rudy and Mike as "Nuts." In return, Mike refers to Harold as a "twit." While Rudy was the original target of Harold's snide comments, the verbal fights that ensue between them are really Harold making a comment and Mike standing up for Rudy, while Rudy maintains a neutral presence and simply adds in neutral observations or requests. As a result of Harold's verbal hostility he's a target for Rudy's retaliation (such as filling his shoes with garbage, then spilling it into his pillow when he's ordered to spill the waste out, or removing the wooden slats that support his mattress to build a box, and then capitalizing his resulting fall on top of Adam Willis below him as the catalyst for a major pillow fight (to be blamed on him for "Jumping on Adam for no reason at all").

Frank, the head counselor, is in charge of all the counselors and is the first one at the beginning to ask the Warden, "Is there any last problems that we should know about?" foreshadowing the major problem Rudy becomes for the entire staff.

Pierre is the counselor in charge of arts and crafts. He criticizes Chip's humorless handling of Rudy and Mike, initially believing that some activity (like arts and crafts) will keep the boys from running away. After he is proven wrong in this aspect, he tries to play along with Rudy's humor, thus being able to foresee an escape plan, but not the chaos caused by the attempted escape. He admires Rudy's wit.

Mr. Warden is the camp director. His grandfather, Elias Warden, founded the camp thirty years prior to the present in the book and usually states, every time something unusual or not normal happens, "This is Camp Algonkian Island. It was founded thirty-one years ago by my grandfather, Elias Warden, and never once, before today, has [anything not normal happened]." A middle-aged man with bow legs who apparently does not like kids, he strictly lives by the time in which his grandfather was director of the camp, meaning nothing to him can be different now from then. This stern belief usually blinds him from current problems or preventing future problems, and he remains completely oblivious to virtually any of the actions or events that take place in the novel. He is the first to find out that a newcomer to the camp, Rudy Miller, could potentially become a problem, but forgets about that due to kids never being a problem and always loving camp in his grandfather's age. He lives by this one rule: That is the way it was then, that is the way it is now.

== Side characters ==
Named campers from Camp Algonkian Island (AKA; Alcatraz):

- Adam Willis
- Joey Peters
- Brian Meadows

Named campers from Camp Silver Lake:

- Mary
- Grace
- Barbara
- Laura

Named camp counsellors (AKA; clones)/staff:

- George Harper, counsellor of cabin 1
- Ralph Deacon, counsellor of cabin 3
- Leo Martin, counsellor of cabin 15
- Jim Golfarb, counsellor of cabin 18
- Jack Tyler
- Dave, swim coach
- Fred Baldwin, tennis instructor

Others:

- Susan Miller, Rudy's mother
- Edward Miller, Rudy's father
- Jeffery Miller, Rudy's younger (eight-year-old) brother
- Vicky Webster, Mike's younger sister

== Reception ==
On its republication in 2004, Resource Links proclaimed that the book is "good, even great at times" and that it "will be as popular with young readers today as it was more than 20 years ago". CM Magazine said that while it "[won't] ever be considered great literature", it is a "laugh out loud adventure" and a "Canadian classic"; however they also felt that the character of Mr Warden was "questionable".

Pasha Malla, in a 2008 article for CBC.ca, wrote that "even beyond nostalgia, it's a fun, engaging read" and that the sarcasm of the main character had been "refreshing" for him.
