= Losing Joe's Place =

1990 novel by Gordon Korman

- Front cover
- Author: Gordon Korman
- Language: English
- Genre: Adventure fiction
- Published: 1990, Scholastic
- Publication place: United States
- Media type: Print, e-book, audiobook
- Pages: 233 pages
- ISBN: 0-590-42768-7

Losing Joe's Place is a 1990 teen novel by Gordon Korman. The book was first published on April 1, 1990 through Scholastic and follows the adventures of three small town Ontario boys (Jason, Ferguson and Don) as they live in Jason's brother's (Joe) apartment in Toronto for a summer. However, there is one catch: Under no circumstances can they cause Joe to lose his lease. Losing Joe's Place was listed on YALSA's "Popular Paperbacks for Young Adults 2001".

According to WorldCat, the book is held in 659 libraries

== Plot ==
The novel starts in September, after Joe Cardone, the brother of the main character, has come back from his trip to Europe, and after the summer in Toronto for Jason Cardone (Joe's brother) and his two friends, Don and Ferguson (Peachfuzz) the novel chronicles. They have lost his lease and he is taking out his temper on Jason. September ends with Jason calling Don and Ferguson so they can start looking for a new place for Joe to live. The novel then flashes back to the previous June. The characters have convinced their parents to let them move into Joe Cardone, Jason Cardone's older brother's house for the summer. Early on, Ferguson makes Jason and Don lose their jobs at the plastics company where they work, and Jason and Don attempt to find jobs. While they are at a "teenage club" Don attempts to hit on a girl, Jessica, and ends up knocking her out cold by accident. Immediately after that, Don and Ferguson each attempt to get Jessica's attention throughout the rest of the book, Jason feeling like a 3rd wheel until the end of the book where Jessica confesses her love for Jason, after knocking Jason out cold with a pair of brass knuckles. Don finds jobs fairly easily but is almost immediately fired, however, Jason doesn't find a single job because Jessica constantly asking Jason for help with different things during the book. A friend of Joe's, Rootbeer Racinette helps Jason and Don earn money by doing various odd jobs and illegal gambling using his large size. Later in the book, Ferguson makes a plan to get revenge on their nosy landlord, Plotnick, who sells hubcaps in the deli that he owns. This results in Plotnick being hit in the head by a flying hubcap, and severely hurt, and put in traction for a month. Jason feels responsible for this and takes to running the deli in Plotnick's absence. The deli becomes a hit, and at the end of the month, Jason has earned so much money that Plotnick sells all the apartment and builds an expensive beach condo over it, thus losing the lease of all the people living there. The book ends where the start left off, and Jason finds a new, better apartment for Joe.

== Characters ==
- Jason Cardone. The main character, Jason, and his friends, Don and Ferguson are enjoying summer in Toronto. He is the brother of Joe, who is the renter of the apartment they are staying at (though they are paying the rent) and is the only "non-house guest". Later in the novel, he discovers he enjoys cooking - more so when it gives him an excuse to avoid having to look for a job to replace the one he lost. This fondness for futzing around with food later translated into the opening of Chocolate Memories in Plotnick's old deli.
- Don Champion. One of Jason's friends and one of the "house guests" he has over for the summer at his brother's apartment. A jack of all trades, in the novel he goes through the jobs of delivery boy, plastic worker, usher, chrome specialist, and more.
- Ferguson Peach. Often referred to by his nickname, Peachfuzz, he is extremely smart and has been shown to be able to tell if something is wrong with a car by just listening to it - and correctly identifying the problem with it. He caused Jason's and Don's departure from their first employer in Toronto when he was able to modernize it, saving the company millions but causing the job loss of his friends. Don is shown to have a dislike of him.
- Mr. Plotnick. Joe's landlord. A spendthrift, he only replaces items when someone breaks a piece of it, at which point he replaces the whole thing, makes it look really fancy, and charges the damager the bill. Also the owner of the Olympian Deli (and later Chocolate Memories), which is located underneath the apartment complex that Joe lives in. Using pipes and heating ducts, he has the ability to hear everyone in his building and give them unsolicited advice and opinions.
- Rootbeer Racinette. A huge, hulking figure with a new hobby almost every day, including (but not limited to) painting, model airplanes, money, stamps, bubble blowing, the kazoo and telescopes. He is also a believer in a special type of meditation that makes it look like the meditator is dead. He has been shown to make a large amount of money at various times by making outrageous bets, such as destroying a tire by biting it and fighting professional wrestlers for minimal money. He is Joe's friend which is how he is able to move into their apartment, much to the dismay of everyone involved (except, of course, himself). Note the joke with his name. In French, Racinette means rootbeer, causing his name to be Rootbeer Rootbeer.
- Jessica. A love interest of Don and Ferguson. She is shown to be absolutely inept at cooking (having failed Home Ec.) and cleaning, often losing interest in seconds leaving Jason to finish it. She later works at Chocolate Memories.
- Joe Cardone. Jason's brother. A bodybuilder and renter of the apartment that Jason, Don, and Ferguson stay at. Friend of Rootbeer Racinette.

== Reception ==
The Canadian Review of Materials praised Losing Joe's Place, remarking that it was "fast paced with great characters and full of unbelievable events that we would all like to believe possible!" The Horn Book Guide also gave a favorable review, calling it the "ultimate teenage fantasy".
