= No Coins, Please =

1984 novel by Gordon Korman

- Cover (1984 PB edition)
- Author: Gordon Korman
- Language: English
- Genre: Adventure
- Publisher: Scholastic Canada Ltd.
- Publication date: 1984
- Publication place: Canada
- Media type: Print (Hardcover)
- Pages: 184
- ISBN: 0-590-33466-2

No Coins, Please is a 1984 children's novel by Gordon Korman. The book is recommended for grades 6-8, and 820L on the Lexile measure.

== Plot ==
Juniortours is an outfit that drives children across America during the summer months. When Group Ambulance's Artie Geller, a precocious 11-year-old con artist from Montreal signs on, counselors Rob and Dennis find they have more than the usual summer job on their hands. From the streets of New York City to the casinos of Las Vegas, Artie proves as slippery as ever.

== Reception ==
Hazlitt has called it a "Canadian classic". CM: A Reviewing Journal of Canadian Materials for Young People , the journal of the Canadian Library Association, faulted its "rather wooden characters" and its "repetitive" plot, but noted that younger readers would likely ignore these aspects.

In 2017, Nicole Dieker revisited the book for The Billfold. Dieker noted that what makes the book "delightful" is "how logical Artie's whole enterprise is", and praised Korman for revealing that Artie had not been able to avoid being noticed by law enforcement; however, she also emphasized that upon rereading the book as an adult, it became more clear to her that "Artie isn’t a good person".

== Publication history ==
- — (1984). No Coins, Please (1st HC ed.). Richmond Hill, Ontario: Scholastic-Tab. ISBN 0-59071-444-9.
- — (1984). No Coins, Please. Scholastic. ISBN 0590334662.
- — (1989). No Coins, Please. Scholastic. ISBN 0590437097.
- — (1991). No Coins, Please. Scholastic Canada. ISBN 0590442082.
- — (2005). No Coins, Please. Scholastic Canada Ltd. ISBN 9780439961721.
