= Beware the Fish =

Children's book

- 1980 paperback edition
- Author: Gordon Korman
- Cover artist: Rodrigo Moreno; Luis Borba; Photo-Illustration by Yüksel Hassan; 2004 version
- Language: English
- Series: Macdonald Hall Series
- Genre: Adventure
- Publisher: Scholastic Canada Ltd.
- Publication date: 1980, 2004
- Publication place: Canada
- Media type: Print (Paperback)
- Pages: 160 (not including the preview at the end)
- ISBN: 0-439-96901-8
- Preceded by: Go Jump in the Pool
- Followed by: The War with Mr. Wizzle

Beware The Fish! is the third installment in the Macdonald Hall Series, and it continues to follow the two main characters Bruno and Boots along with the ensemble students of Macdonald Hall. This, along with The Zucchini Warriors, is one of the few titles in the series which did not have a title change like the rest of the books did. And like all the other books, it received new, younger-appealing cover art and was rewritten to apply to contemporary society, economy and technology. It was written in 1980 by Gordon Korman.

== Plot ==
Macdonald Hall is having a severe budget problem. The Headmaster, William R. Sturgeon or by his nickname, The Fish, is taking budgetary measures like lowering dormitory temperatures and removing junk food from the menus in the cafeteria. When Bruno and Boots figure this out after being forced into Dormitory 2 with Elmer Drimsdale when he closes the third dorm building, they decide to try to gain Macdonald Hall some publicity in order to enroll more students and solve their money problems. Elmer Drimsdale comes up with a new machine that mimics a broadcasting system, with a lens and microphone pointed at a labeled diagram of a Pacific king salmon, but he informs the hopeful two that it won't broadcast further than the room. Still, Bruno uses it to channel his frustrations by pretending to be a conspirator of an evil fish organization (never appearing on camera but narrating the plans of the conspiracy). Unknown to Elmer and Bruno, the device can actually broadcast a radius of 43 kilometres around the school and overpower all commercial television broadcasts on its frequency within that range.

Meanwhile, everyone is trying to think of ideas of coming up with publicity. This leads to the idea of breaking the world record of the largest tin can pyramid. During the nights of the weekend almost the entire student body leaves the property to go and collect soda cans from nearby townships and villages. Bruno and Boots go all the way to Toronto, hitching a ride in the morning on a school bus field trip back to Ms. Scrimmage's Finishing School For Young Ladies, the girls' school across from Macdonald Hall. Throughout the novel two undercover agents stay in separate rooms right next to each other at a hotel in the town of Chutney, one from the RCMP, the other from the OPP, investigating the fish conspiracy that people had been complaining about seeing on their televisions. They are both at first under the impression that the other is "The Fish," the head of the evil organization, but soon trace the broadcasts back to Macdonald Hall.

During a night of interruption from Ms. Scrimmage who catches the boys from the hall trespassing on the property, along with Mr. Sturgeon, she unwittingly comes upon all the stored cans in the vacant Dormitory Three. The boys had been coming to get all the cans from the girls who'd also been collecting them. Mr. Sturgeon expects Bruno and Boots to be the culprits, but just before they tell him of the whole process, they are saved by Cathy Burton, one of their friends from Scrimmage's, who tells him that the cans are her collection. Thus, the cans are removed from the property to be stored at Scrimmage's and Sturgeon does not dispute this claim considering that Ms. Scrimmage, who has been annoying him, will have to deal with them herself.

In the climax, the police form a barricade around the school to attempt to arrest Sturgeon, whom they believe to be The Fish, due to his surname and the nickname "the Fish" that the students have given him. All the students, from both schools, come out in wonder. Everything is exposed as Bruno reveals it was Elmer's device that had caused it, but he hadn't known it was that powerful. Due to all the exposure from the police, the explosion due to Elmer's equipment being buried with the chemicals reacting to the shotgun blasts from Ms. Scrimmage, and most of all the press that had arrived to capture The Fish being caught, the right message gets through and the school gets its publicity. A record enrollment comes up for next year, solving all the school's money problems.

In the end, Ms. Scrimmage's Finishing School for Young Ladies wins the world record for the largest tin can pyramid, to Bruno's severe chagrin.

Macdonald Hall is located somewhere north of Toronto, along Highway 48 and seven miles south of the fictitious town of Chutney, Ontario (pop. 3100).
