= Son of Interflux =

1986 novel by Gordon Korman

- First edition
- Author: Gordon Korman
- Language: English
- Genre: Adventure
- Publisher: Scholastic Canada Ltd.
- Publication date: 1986/2006
- Publication place: Canada
- Media type: Print (Paperback)
- Pages: 282
- ISBN: 0-590-40163-7

Son of Interflux is a 1986 children's novel by Gordon Korman.

== Plot ==
Simon Irving has just moved to the town of Greenbush, New York with his parents. His father is the Senior Vice President of Interflux, a large corporation that makes only components of items. He enters into Nassau County High School for Visual, Literary and Performing Arts, an arts school, in an attempt to become a painter and therefore avoid the business job that his father has planned for him.

When he finds out that a major expansion is in the works and that the school's greenspace (a small wood and stream) will have to be cut down to make way, Simon finds a way to get back at Interflux.

He uses Student Council funds to purchase a crazily shaped strip of land that Interflux is not aware of and therefore does not own. Inventing the rival group "Antiflux", he convinces most of the school's 1500 students to go along with him. By blockading the land, Antiflux causes the expansion to grind to a halt.

On top of this, Simon has to keep his grades up and keep the student body from finding out that he is the Son of Interflux.

== Cast of characters ==
=== Main ===
- Simon Irving - 16, Cyril and Mary's son
- Cyril Irving - Simon's father, Mary's husband, head of Interflux
- Mary Irving - Simon's mother, Cyril's wife, health food enthusiast
- Kyle Montrose - irresponsible chairman of the board of Interflux/"The Flake"

=== Students ===
- Sam "Sotirios" Stavrinidis
- Philip "Phil" Baldwin
- T.C. Serrette - "Agent" That helps students improve their grades
- Wendy Orr - Student Council president and also Simon's girlfriend later on in the book
- Nathan Kruppman- senior film student
- Jonathan Zulanovitch (Jonny Zull) - Simon's lab partner, virtuoso guitarist

=== Teachers ===
- Emile Querada - art teacher
- Xerxes "Buzz" Durham - English
- Miss Glandfield - Biology

=== Previous works ===
A sign saying Calvin Fihzgart & Co., wholesale corsets is seen on a warehouse. Calvin Fihzgart was a character in The Zucchini Warriors.
