= Hideout (novel) =

2013 book by Gordon Korman

- Author: Gordon Korman
- Cover artist: Jennifer Taylor
- Language: English
- Series: Swindle
- Genre: Adventure; Children's
- Publisher: Scholastic
- Publication date: 2013
- Publication place: United States
- Media type: Print
- Pages: 288
- ISBN: 978-0545448666
- OCLC: 795164684
- LC Class: PZ7.K8769 Hid 2013
- Preceded by: Showoff (novel)
- Followed by: Jackpot (novel)

Hideout is a novel by Gordon Korman. It serves as the fifth novel in the Swindle series, with Griffin Bing and his friends Savannah, Ben, Antonia "Pitch", Logan, and Melissa.

== Plot ==
Swindle is back, and he wants his dog, Luthor, back. After the once menacing guard dog almost won the Global Kennel Dog Show, S. Wendell Palomino (AKA Swindle) sees a chance to become rich. And with that money, he'll devote his life to ruining Griffin and his friends' lives. Griffin knows that, but when Palomino actually shows up at Savannah Drysdale's house, in the middle of Luthor's birthday party, he's still surprised. Swindle claims Luthor still belongs to him, and the Cedarville pound cannot find the file that says the Drysdales legally adopted him (which we later find out that Palomino stole). They take this matter to court, and when the judge declares that Savannah must return Luthor to Palomino, she's heartbroken. She enlists Griffin to deduct a plan to prove Luthor is rightfully hers. The book consists of three parts, one for each hideout, at each camp. Savannah and Griffins camp is the first hideout, Melissa and Logan's camp is the next, and Pitch and Ben's camp is the last hideout. The struggle is increased with different goons that Palomino hired, plagiarizing random people at the camp, trying to move the heavy Luthor to different camps, and the fact that they have no transportation except random delivery trucks.
