= Macdonald Hall =

Canadian book series

Macdonald Hall is a series of young adult novels by author Gordon Korman. The series was formerly named Bruno and Boots.

The series is set in a Canadian boarding school for boys called Macdonald Hall (named for John A. Macdonald, the first prime minister of Canada), located somewhere north of the city of Toronto along Highway 48 and seven miles (11 km) south of the fictitious town of Chutney. The school's enrollment is around 700 students.

The lead characters are Bruno Walton and Melvin "Boots" O'Neal, Macdonald Hall students who have a well-earned reputation for mischief. Despite their troublemaking, the pair have a deep loyalty to the school and many of the books have them and their friends going to great lengths to support it. It is unknown how old they are, but they are too young to shave.

The school's headmaster is William R. Sturgeon, also known as "The Fish" by the students. This unwanted nickname comes not only from his name, but also from his bespectacled fish-like appearance when he glares disapprovingly at his students. While he is a firm disciplinarian with a carefully cultivated authoritative image, he also cares deeply for his school and the children under his care. His wife cares just as much for the students, and whenever Bruno and Boots come by, she offers them cookies and milk. Mrs. Sturgeon isn't as strict as her husband and has, on a number of occasions, defended their pranks.

Across the street is another school, Miss Scrimmage's Finishing School for Young Ladies. However, despite the obtuse headmistress's best efforts, the girls there are even more rambunctious than the boys of Macdonald Hall, and are always ready for whatever fun that Bruno and Boots have in mind. Miss Scrimmage happens to own a shotgun which she uses to threaten anyone who disturbs the peace or comes by her school, but she has poor control of it and is prone to accidental shootings in random directions. Miss Scrimmage uses her shotgun whenever she finds the boys on her property (usually after lights out) resulting in Mr. Sturgeon wishing her to have it taken away.

At times, the two schools have joined forces, such as in The Wizzle War, wherein Mr. Sturgeon gains a new assistant principal, Mr. Wizzle, who is a firm believer in categorizing and "computerizing" Macdonald Hall. Meanwhile, Miss Scrimmage hires a former drill instructor as her assistant; afterward, the two student bodies team up to send the new staff "as far as they can afford to send them" before the school board decides that keeping them at the school is a good idea.

Several of the novels have been adapted for YTV as the television film series Bruno & Boots. To date, the adapted books have been Go Jump in the Pool in 2016, and This Can't Be Happening at Macdonald Hall and The War with Mr. Wizzle in 2017.

== Books in the series ==
Some of the books have been reissued under variant titles, and with updated references to bring their settings forward into something closer to the present day. This is particularly noticeable in The War with Mr. Wizzle, which focuses on computerizing the school.

- This Can't Be Happening at Macdonald Hall (1978, also titled This Can't Be Happening)

The first book in the series was written when Korman was in Grade Seven. The briefest of the series, the book introduces the school and its boys. Bruno and Boots are separated as roommates after committing three pranks at the hockey match against their arch-rival, York Academy; Bruno moves in with Elmer Drimsdale, the school genius, whereas Boots moves in with the school financial genius and resident hypochondriac, George Wexford-Smyth III. The boys scheme to convince Mr. Sturgeon ("The Fish"), the headmaster, to allow them to move back to Room 306.

- Go Jump in the Pool (1979)

York Academy has a pool, whereas Macdonald Hall does not. Although the students previously accepted this disparity, a potential crisis emerged when some boys reported that their parents were considering transferring them to York Academy due to its superior sports facilities. In response, the boys initiated various fundraising campaigns with the goal of constructing a pool at Macdonald Hall that would surpass the rival school's facility.

- Beware the Fish! (1980)

Macdonald Hall is closing! Their school is in jeopardy and the best way to save it, according to Bruno, is to get the word out about how great their school is. Bruno leads a scheme to get the name of Macdonald Hall known all over Canada. While the boys are doing this, to blow off steam, Bruno starts playing with one of Elmer Drimsdale's inventions and inadvertently starts a police investigation into the activities of the operative known as "The Fish."

- The War with Mr. Wizzle (1982, retitled The Wizzle War 2003)

Macdonald Hall is inefficient. Miss Scrimmage's school is out-of-shape. Enter Walter C. Wizzle and his computer to improve the Hall, and Miss Peabody, the new girls' physical education coach. The school's students team up to get rid of Wizzle and Peabody before the school board hires them on permanently.

- The Zucchini Warriors (1988)

Hank Carson, a millionaire former football player, now makes his money in the zucchini stick business. A former student at Macdonald Hall, he wants a winning football team at his alma mater, so the boys try to make him happy by "eating" his horrible zucchini sticks and making the best plays possible. In order to succeed, the pair scheme to create the zucchini disposal squad and disguise their quarterback, who comes from Miss Scrimmage's!

- Macdonald Hall Goes Hollywood (1991, renamed Lights, Camera, Disaster! 2004)

Jordie Jones, a Hollywood actor, is shooting a movie at Macdonald Hall and wants to spend time with the students to learn about life at the school. The students at Miss Scrimmages admire Jordie, but Bruno dislikes him and plans to make him leave.

- Something Fishy At Macdonald Hall (1995, renamed The Joke's On Us 2004)

Boots' little brother, Edward, has arrived to start his first year at Macdonald Hall. Bruno can't wait to teach him all he knows, but Edward thinks they are "over the hill" and "old men". At the same time, Mr. Sturgeon is thinking about retirement, saying that school life poses "no challenge". Suddenly someone starts pranking the Hall, and this time it isn't Bruno and Boots! But no one believes them? Can they stop themselves from getting expelled and clear their name?

== Characters in the series ==
=== Macdonald Hall Students ===
Macdonald Hall is a private school for boys only. It is ranked first in academic standards.

Bruno Walton - Full of schemes, he is the one who spearheads the organization of the plots. He's extremely loyal to his friends, and there is virtually no limit to what he will attempt in the furtherance of his goals—although he usually gets others to do the bulk of the actual work. However, like Boots, he is honest, and if asked by the headmaster about his participation in a given scheme, Bruno will admit to what he has done. He is not a Jordie Jones fan.

Melvin P. "Boots" O'Neal - Bruno's roommate, and often unwilling right-hand man. He is generally Bruno's voice of reason and stops the pair from going too far. A studious blond boy who enjoys swimming and is the captain of the hockey team. He has a younger brother, Edward, whom he dislikes with a passion.

Elmer Drimsdale - The school's genius. He is the gang's scientific expert and is very unwilling to break any rules, including sneaking out to Scrimmage's after hours. Socially awkward and often absorbed in his scientific projects, he is initially disliked by both Bruno and Boots. Over time, however, they grow to see that while Elmer may be awkward and a stickler for rules, he is also honest and helpful, and a genuinely decent, kind person. Especially in later volumes, Elmer is generally (though not always) considered a friend, even if his complete refusal to break rules often gets in the way of Bruno's schemes. He has various projects which threaten to take over his room including ants, and plants. He wakes up at 6:00 a.m. each day to tend to these various projects before breakfast. He lives in Dormitory 2.

George Wexford-Smyth III - A financial genius who is obsessed with the stock market, he also keeps his bathroom stocked with medicines. He also sanitizes his room every second day, washing everything in his room, including the ceiling and the walls, to prevent illness. He has a snobbish attitude and is generally disliked by his peers—unlike their views on Elmer, Bruno & Boots never really change their negative opinion about George. (However, they will grudgingly admit that he was key in helping the Hall raise enough money to buy a pool.) George lives in Dormitory 1.

Wilbur Hackenschleimer - A large boy who is known for having a voracious appetite, he is one of the most willing participants in the schemes Bruno comes up with. He is an amateur weightlifter who once lifted a piano, a player on the football team and is talented at woodwork and metal shop. He lives in Dormitory 1.

Mark Davies - The school newspaper editor, and friend of Bruno and Boots. He lives in Dormitory 2. Ultra-dependable—after pledging to develop all the photos taken in a Macdonald Hall photo contest, Mark even developed and posted a highly embarrassing photo of himself taken by another student.

Peter "Pete" Anderson - A student who gets relatively low grades and constantly worries about failing in school. Usually helps Bruno, though very unwillingly.

Sidney Rampulsky - Sidney "Butterfingers" Rampulsky is well known for his clumsiness ("That guy could trip over a moonbeam!") which seems to be amplified by his uneasiness around Bruno Walton. He is usually at the forefront of any of damage that happens at the Hall.

Perry Elbert - A student and gymnast living in Dormitory 2 who mistrusts and dislikes Bruno, mostly because he almost always ends up getting inadvertently injured (and/or embarrassed) whenever Bruno's around, and therefore hates him with a passion. He is famous for being photographed taking a bath with a rubber ducky.

Calvin Fihzgart - He is a braggart who claims to be skilled at many things. He nicknamed himself "The Beast" to improve his enthusiasm for practicing football. He tried to get pulled out of a game due to what the nurse pronounced "a bruise," however, so his actual football skill is questionable.

Christopher "Chris" Talbot - Assigned to Dormitory 1, he is known for his artwork and often makes posters to advertise Bruno's schemes. Almost always included in Bruno's plans, as he's reliable, and always willing to help.

Larry Wilson - A student who also works in the office, and delivers messages. He does spy work for Bruno in several books. He lives in Dormitory 1.

Myron Blankenship - The school blabbermouth. He never fails to mention any embarrassing secret about anyone. (E.g.: He caused Bruno to become greatly embarrassed by telling everyone about the lucky penny Bruno carries everywhere.)

Edward O'Neal - The younger brother of Boots who became enrolled to Macdonald Hall in Something Fishy at Macdonald Hall. He disdains Bruno and Boots and their friends, calling them "old men" and "over the hill". He struggles with math.

=== Macdonald Hall staff ===
William R. Sturgeon, aka "The Fish" - The Headmaster. He cares greatly about the students but does not often show it, except to the parents. He and his wife live on the school grounds in their own home. His nickname comes from the cold, fishy stare he can use on his students.

Mildred Sturgeon - The headmaster's merciful wife who frequently reminds him to be less strict. She is very forgiving of Bruno and Boots and their pranks.

Mr. Alex (Coach) Flynn - The physical education teacher and coach, and the housemaster in charge on Dormitory 2.

Mr. Dave Fudge - The housemaster in charge of Dormitory 3. He is also in charge of the guidance department, which was eliminated during Mr. Wizzle's tenure at Macdonald Hall. He is known for sleeping soundly.

Mr. Lautrec - The industrial arts teacher.

James R. (Jim) Snow - The chairman of the Board of Directors of Macdonald Hall.

Mr. Stratton - The math teacher at Macdonald Hall.

Mr. Walter C. Wizzle - A modernization expert sent, with his computer, to improve the school's efficiency in "The War With Mr. Wizzle."

Mrs. Davis - The school secretary.

Mr. Foley, the English teacher.

=== Miss Scrimmage's Finishing School for Young Ladies ===
Miss Scrimmage's Finishing School for Young Ladies is a girls-only private school located across from Macdonald Hall. Miss Scrimmage is the Headmistress. The students of Miss Scrimmage's Finishing School for Young Ladies have a well-deserved reputation as hooligans, despite the Headmistress' fervent belief that she is grooming proper young ladies. The school is ranked at 217th place, well behind Macdonald Hall's 1st place.

Miss Scrimmage - The headmistress. She owns a shotgun to protect her young ladies, and fires it in the air whenever the school is being 'invaded' by the Macdonald Hall boys. Her school was ranked as 217th, in contrast to Macdonald Hall's number one spot.

Catherine Elizabeth "Cathy" Burton - The Bruno-equivalent, Cathy is good at football and can even play quarterback, though she is mischievous, just like Bruno, such as when she played under Elmer's name so she could join the team at Macdonald Hall. She has dark hair.

Diane Grant - The Boots-equivalent, Diane has blonde hair, and is more timid about Cathy's schemes. She has a pet skunk called Petunia.

Miss Gloria Peabody - Miss Scrimmage's assistant headmistress during "The War With Mr. Wizzle." She previously worked at a Marine training center in Seattle, WA.

Ruth Sidwell, Wilma Dorf, and Vanessa Robinson - three students, briefly sketched.

=== Other recurring characters ===
Mr. Thomas Hartley — The Headmaster at York Academy, the rival school to Macdonald Hall.

== TV adaptation ==
Three Macdonald Hall series books were TV adapted as the "Bruno & Boots" miniseries, with Go Jump in the Pool, This Can't Be Happening at Macdonald Hall, and The War with Mr. Wizzle (as The Wizzle War), starring Jonny Gray, Callan Potter and Peter Keleghan and debuting on April 1, 2016 firstly with Go Jump In The Pool, on the Canadian network YTV. The other two adaptations aired on YTV the next year on the same day.
