= Schooled (novel) =

Book by Gordon Korman

- Author: Gordon Korman
- Cover artist: Ellice M. Lee
- Language: English
- Genre: Young adult
- Set in: Northern California
- Publisher: Scholastic
- Publication date: 2007
- Publication place: Canada
- Media type: NotPrint
- Pages: 208
- ISBN: 978-1-4231-0516-9

Schooled is a 2007 coming-of-age young adult novel by Canadian American author Gordon Korman. The novel follows a young boy, Capricorn "Cap" Anderson raised in an isolated hippie commune who is sent to live with foster parents and attend public school following his grandmother's hospitalization.

The story is told via first-person narrative, from the point of view from different characters in each chapter.

== Plot ==
Capricorn Anderson, nicknamed "Cap" and his grandmother, Rain, are hippies living on Garland Farm, a far-removed commune with no telephone service. Cap is arrested for driving without a license while trying to take Rain to the hospital after an injury she sustained climbing a tree. Rain's injury requires her to undergo physical therapy for two months, leaving Capricorn without a caretaker or a teacher. Capricorn is sent to live with social worker Flora Donnelly, a former resident of Garland Farm, after she realizes that she herself is the best person to look after Cap. Flora decides to enroll Cap in Claverage Middle Schooll (dubbed C-Average by the student body) as an eighth grader while Rain recovers.

At Claverage, Cap finds himself completely unfamiliar with most social situations and modern inconveniences. On his first day, he meets eighth-grade bully and jock Zachary "Zach" Powers, who singles him out for the school's biggest prank: electing the most unpopular student as the Eighth Grade President and besetting the victim with impossible demands, causing them to break down. Cap also meets Hugh Winkleman, a geeky social outcast at school, and befriends him. Cap ends up becoming the eighth-grade president due to his abnormal appearance and behavior. Flora, realizing that Cap's obliviousness to social life and bullying protects him from the brunt of the abuse, reluctantly keeps silent. Meanwhile, Zach advances his plans to break Cap, enlisting the majority of the students, one of whom is Naomi, a girl with a crush on Zach. Naomi writes Cap fake love letters to get Zach's approval but begins to find herself drawn to Cap. However, Cap is unaffected and carries on as usual.

During a bus ride home, the driver has a heart attack and Cap steps up to drive the bus to the hospital, saving the driver's life and impressing the students on board. He is arrested for driving without a license, but Flora gets him released. Despite disapproval from adults and the authorities, Cap gains newfound popularity at C Average, causing Zach's plan to ultimately backfire. The students, including the popular kids, begin to genuinely admire Cap, and begin to practice Tai Chi with him and listen to his music. They also offer to help him with planning events, including the popular Halloween Dance. Principal Kasigi gives Cap signed checks to pay for the planning, but Cap, oblivious to the fact that money can run out, signs checks liberally, donating to charities and earning him even more popularity. He also uses the school's money to buy a belated birthday gift for Sophie, Flora's daughter, pretending it's a gift from her absent father Bill, and also gives her driving lessons when Bill flakes on Sophie yet again. Hugh, however, becomes jealous of Cap's popularity, especially when being Cap's best friend doesn't improve his outcast status. Zach is also resentful of Cap stealing his popularity and uses Hugh's anger to his advantage in an unlikely team-up to take revenge. During a pep rally, Hugh and Zach dress Cap as a player on C Average's rival football team and send him out to the field to be tackled by the entire football team. When Zach's best friend Darryl realizes the former's involvement and that he was used, he angrily confronts Zach and attempts to punch him, only for Cap to throw himself in front of the blow in an attempt to stop the fight. Cap is picked up in an ambulance containing Rain, who has recovered and takes him out of school and back to Garland Farm.

Kasigi and Flora discover Cap's misspending of the school's money, and the former cancels the Halloween Dance. This, along with the circumstances of Cap's removal from school, and lack of further information, leads to rumors that Cap died as a result of his injuries. Zach and Hugh, now vilified by the students because of their plan to hurt Cap, come up with a new plan to save face by holding a "memorial service" for Cap in lieu of the cancelled Halloween Dance. Back on Garland, Cap begins to miss modern student life, much to Rain's chagrin. He decides to head back to see the Halloween Dance, oblivious as ever. He is picked up by Sophie, who has passed her driving exam and feels remorseful of her scornful behavior towards him, having realized who her belated gift came from. Cap and Sophie discover the memorial to him, and Cap reveals himself to the students, who become overjoyed with his return. He tells the students his time at C Average is over and performs the impressive feat of saying goodbye to each individual student, having memorized all of their names. This impresses even Zach, who also begins to appreciate Hugh for standing by him. Before he departs, Flora lectures Rain about the fallibility of the hippie lifestyle, noting how Cap misspent the school's money and how Rain cannot sustain him forever. Having said his goodbyes, Cap goes back to Garland with Rain.

Later, Cap is arrested once again for driving on Garland Farm without a license and is told that he no longer has permission to drive on the property because Rain no longer owns Garland, having sold it. She shows up at the police station, driving a Mercedes and wearing stylish clothes. She tells Cap that Flora was right, and that her accident was a wake-up call to make sure Cap is taken care of, knowing she won't live forever. She reassures Cap however, that she has not completely sold out on the ideals of the sixties. She tells him that she sold Garland for seventeen million dollars, and that she has bought a condo for the two to live in and has taken inspiration from Cap's actions with the school's money to create a charitable foundation. In the meantime, while she oversees the transactions, she tells Cap that he'll be staying with the Donnelly's again, and that he'll be able to return to C Average. Cap is overjoyed, noting that he already knows everyone's names.

== Reception ==
Booklist described Schooled as a "rewarding novel" which "features an engaging main character and some memorable moments of comedy, tenderness, and reflection". School Library Journal commended the novel's "well-paced narration" which compensated for "some voices falling a little flat" and that "On occasion, the volume levels of transitioning segments are uneven."
