= Son of the Mob 2: Hollywood Hustle =

Book written by Gordon Korman

- Author: Gordon Korman
- Language: English
- Genre: Young adult literature, college students
- Publisher: Hyperion
- Publication date: 2004
- Publication place: United States
- Media type: Print (Hardcover)
- Pages: 268p
- ISBN: 9780786809189
- OCLC: 54677572
- LC Class: PZ7.K8369 Sp 2004
- Preceded by: Son of the Mob

Son of the Mob 2: Hollywood Hustle is a book written by Canadian author Gordon Korman in 2004. It is a sequel of Son of the Mob, written two years previously in 2002.

== Plot ==
Set approximately two years after the first book, Vincent Luca drives to university in California, accompanied by best friend Alex Tarkanian and girlfriend Kendra Bightly. During a rest stop in an Illinois motel, Vincent discovers his suitcase to be packed with a rough $3,000,000 instead of his own property. In a cross country phone call later on, Vince's older brother Tommy reveals that his suitcase was switched out with the cash due to the FBI searching for it. He also arranges for "Uncle Bignose", one of the Luca's men, to pick up the suitcase at the Kansas City International Airport, which is done with some confusion as well as an accidental carjack. The trio continue their trip to California, dropping Alex off at college in Vegas, and Kendra at the Burrel Music Academy in Los Angeles, before making his way to the University of Santa Monica.

While settling into his dorm, Vincent meets his enthusiastic roommate Trey Sutter, as well as other neighbours and Trey's congressman father William Sutter. Trey also starts dating the fascinating senior Willow Danziger, who then invites them to a fraternity party. While buying new clothing, due to the fact that the FBI had confiscated Vince's suitcase believing it to contain the cash, Trey is revealed to be a kleptomaniac.

On his first day of university, Vincent meets a fellow student neighbour of his in film production class; P. Richard Shapiro, a snobby student who plans to go above and beyond with his production, bringing out the worst of Vince. The same day, when Richard begins his search for cast members, Vince stupidly gives him Kendra's number. Kendra later accepts a role in Richards musical, much to Vince's annoyance. That same night, at the fraternity, Trey is quickly accepted by the brothers but Vince is barred from premises due to his act of dumping a beer on their half-century old rubber tree, Stedman.

Later on, during work at the foreign student office, Vince discovers that Tommy had ventured out to California to bunk with Vince, supposedly to hide from a mobster who was searching for him over a "piss on car" incident. Tommy informs Vince that he is thinking of leaving the mob, much to Vince's surprise. Tommy instantly jumps into the middle of things, such as intimidating Trey's fraternity into re-inviting Vince, messing up Vince's film project, and unsuccessfully trying to beat up Trey's girlfriend.

Later on, Trey is disgusted that he is to take part in his father's upcoming press conference. He also explains to Vince that the conference is based on the sudden disappearance of the president of the Southern California Concrete Workers Union, Ellis Rank, and the congressman intends on resolving the issue. Around the same time, the two discover "Uncle Uncle", a top Luca mob captain, inside their apartment, and Vince begins to get suspicious.

The day of the press conference, Trey steals a barbecue in an attempt to avoid it, but is ratted out by Vince, who decides to attend for support. While at the conference, he notices Uncle Uncle and various Luca men spread out through the crowd. Vince also encounters Willow, who flirts with him and goads him into a kiss right after chaos breaks out among the crowd, possibly due to the acts of the Luca men. When Vincent returns to the dorm, he finds all six men inside as well as Tommy. They easily befriend Trey, and party for countless hours. Meanwhile, Vince suspects them of tampering with the union.

The next day, in a phone call, Alex reveals to Vince that he is currently offering homage to Frankie Toronto, one of Tommy's friends whose apartment is currently undergoing renovations. Meanwhile, Tommy helps the foreign student apply for massive grants, and Vince attempts to wheedle the reasons for the uncle's stay out of his father over a cross country phone call. Later, a date with Kendra goes terribly wrong when Willow comes between them at a bar, thus causing a fight between the couple. Around that time, Trey reveals to Vince that Willow had lost interest in him, and suspects an older man he saw meeting with her in secret.

The night before Vince's first film project is due, he makes a last ditch attempt to film an ill fated movie at the fraternity, but accidentally switches the film with an Ellis Rank kidnapping tape he found in his room, confirming that the uncles were involved. He tries to tip off Sutter, but instead receives an anonymous message about a late night beach meeting. The "meeting" instead turns out to be an accidental make-out session with Willow, which leaves Vince wet from the ocean and disoriented. That night goes from bad to worse, as Trey and Tommy are both offended and run out on Vince. Trey ends his friendship with Vince, while Tommy disappears.

Vince is miserable and the uncles are out of the action. Meanwhile, Vince discovers that his father has arrived in Los Angeles; a rare move on his behalf. Meanwhile, the foreign students show up in Vince's room complaining that Tommy had stolen their grant money, which Vince promises to return. Alex complains that Frankie probably never had a place, and was just using his room as a hideout. Kendra also shows Vince photo proof of him and Willow on the beach that night, revealing that her father came to town to show her, and breaks up with him. Trey also sees the photos, prompting Vince to reveal his mob status, causing Trey to run off.

Vince goes after him, and finds out that he had stolen a 1960s Volkswagen and was following a limo that supposedly contains Vince's father as well as the uncles. After switching tactics multiple times and picking up Scooby, a foreign student in danger of deportation, Vince, Trey, and the limo end up at an abandoned warehouse where Ellis Rank is being kept. Followed by Scooby, who films the entire event, Vince reunites with his father, Anthony Luca, who protects him from a shootout, and reveals that they had come to rescue Rank, who is momentarily seen chatting with Luca right before Trey purposely crashes his stolen vehicle into a tree. Congressman Sutter and his henchmen were revealed to be behind the kidnapping, and paid Rank's driver, Toothpick, to help them out. The mob manages to restore the Volkswagen to its proper state, and Vince exchanges some last words with his father.

The next day, as the uncles leave, Vince believes he knows where Toothpick is, and in Vegas, reveals to Alex that his "roommate" helped capture Rank. Toothpick, however, is aided by Vince in fleeing the country. While in Vegas, Vince also tracks down the real Frankie Toronto, who has Tommy staying at his place. Vince angrily plays Tommy for the stolen grant cash in a game of blackjack, and wins. At the same time, Congressman Sutter turns himself in to the authorities.

While returning the grant cash to the foreign students, Scooby reveals to Vince that he taped the entire warehouse scene, which Vince uses for his final project in class. It ends up being better than Richard's musical, which was a flop. Meanwhile, Trey discovers that Willow was working with Agent Bightly (Kendra's father), to spy on Congressman Sutter and Anthony Luca via Trey and Vince. Kendra figures it out and reunites with Vince. The book ends with Vince's warehouse tape disappearing, but his father promises that it is still intact and will be preserved by the family.

== Characters ==
- Vince Luca; the son of a mob boss who tries hard to stay out of the business.
- Trey Sutter; the enthusiastic son of a local congressman. He is also Vince's roommate. Trey constantly whines about his father, and is also a kleptomaniac.
- Kendra Bightly; the daughter of the agent on the Luca case. Is also Vince's girlfriend
- William Sutter; The congressman who turns out to have attempted to hijack the Concrete Worker's union. Is Trey's father.
- Anthony Luca; Vince's father. Also the head of the Luca organization.
- Tommy Luca; Vince's untrustworthy older brother, who uses the foreign student's grants to gain 50 grand.
- Willow Danziger; a hot FBI girl in disguise as a senior who used Trey and Vince to spy on their fathers.
- Ellis Rank; the kidnapped Union Leader
- "Toothpick" Anderson; Rank's former driver who sold him out and used Alex's dorm as a hideaway
- Alex Tarkanian; Vince's best friend who attends college in Vegas. He has to endure the presence of Toothpick for two months.
- Uncle Uncle, Uncle Fingers, Uncle Bignose, Uncle No-Nose, Gus the Greek, The Pope, and Rafael; Luca men
- Frankie Toronto; Tommy's friend. He helped forge the signatures that got Tommy the grant cash.
- Pat McCracken; The union representative who is hoping to replace Rank. Is involved in the kidnapping
- Mrs. Luca; Vince's mother
- Zora, Scooby, Rahim, Cobi, and Sato; foreign students who are robbed by Tommy
- P. Richard Shapiro; a snob who Vince expresses dislike for. Referred to as P-Rick. Vince has to suppress those emotions after Richard saves his relationship with Kendra.
- Paul Waghorn; the president of the Lambda Chi fraternity
- Calvin, Mitch, Perry, Alita, and Anthea; other neighbours of Vince and Trey
- Agent Bightly; Kendra's father, the agent on the Luca case
- Beth; Kendra's roommate
- Mr. Baumgartner; Vince and Richard's film production professor
- Mr. Lai; Vince's probability teacher
