= No More Dead Dogs =

Book by Gordon Korman

- First edition
- Author: Gordon Korman
- Language: English
- Genre: Children's novel
- Published: 2000 (Hyperion Books)
- Media type: Print (Paperback)
- Pages: 180
- Awards: 2003 Young Reader's Choice Award (Intermediate)
- ISBN: 0-7868-1601-5
- OCLC: 50608674

No More Dead Dogs is a novel by Gordon Korman published in 2000.

== Plot summary ==
Ever since Wallace Wallace was young, he has insisted on telling the truth. Since scoring the winning touchdown for the Bedford Middle School football team in the championship, Wallace Wallace has been very popular.

When Wallace is assigned to write a report on the book Old Shep, My Pal, he won't lie about his feelings. He dislikes the book and writes a negative review, which results in a detention handed down by his English teacher, Mr. Fogelman, until he writes a quality review. His detention is spent with the drama club. The drama club is led by Mr. Fogelman, and they are working on a production of a dramatic adaptation of Old Shep, My Pal written by Mr. Fogelman. Wallace is initially bored, much to the irritation of Mr. Fogelman and Rachel Turner, the president of the drama club. Soon Wallace makes friends with a few of the actors including Vito Brundia and Everton Wu. He also makes suggestions such as having Rory rollerskate in the play and making the Lamont Kids yo-yo.

Soon after Wallace joins the club, an unknown person vandalizes the play set and rehearsals. Rachel believes Wallace is the culprit. Everyone else initially regards him as a hero and refuses to believe her, but when one of Wallace's scrimmage jerseys appears during a sabotage attempt, they turn against him.

Wallace is eventually banned from the play entirely. Despite his ban, the drama club decides to use Wallace's ideas for the play, including having Shep live at the end. This decision results in disaster when the saboteur blows up the prop Shep with a cherry bomb during the performance—just as the actors praise his miraculous recovery.

Meanwhile, Wallace figures out that the culprit is Rachel's brother Dylan, who wanted revenge because he felt the play had ruined the famous Wallace Wallace. Consequently, Wallace tells his first lie to spare Rachel's feelings. He tells her that it was him vandalizing the play. After her initial anger at Wallace, she realizes on her own that Dylan was behind the attacks. Wallace and Rachel recognize their mutual attraction, and plan to go on a date together.

== Reception ==
In a review for Book Report, Jo Clarke said that "this was one of the funniest books I have ever read!" and that "Middle school kids will enjoy this book because it is so typical of their language, actions, and ideas." However, the Journal of Adolescent & Adult Literacy review said that "the book is filled with jokes aimed at an adult audience rather than one comprised of middle schoolers. These are jokes that desperately wish to be funny but the book produces only one that would be considered genuinely amusing to its demographic" and that "No More Dead Dogs had serious potential to be a much better book than the writing produced."
