= Don't Care High =

Book by Gordon Korman

Don’t Care High
- First edition
- Author: Gordon Korman
- Language: English
- Genre: Young adult
- Publisher: Scholastic Canada Ltd.
- Publication date: 1985
- Publication place: Canada
- Media type: Print (Paperback)
- Pages: 243
- ISBN: 0-590-43129-3

Don't Care High is a 1985 novel by Gordon Korman.

== Plot ==
Paul Abrams has just moved to New York City with his parents. He starts at tenth grade in a new high school, Don Carey High School, which has earned the nickname "Don't Care High" for prevalent student apathy.

When Paul finds out that no one at Don Carey cares much about anything, he tries to motivate them by nominating Mike Otis, a reclusive man of mystery, for student council president. Mike runs unopposed and is soon elected (first since 1956), but the students soon forget about him. Paul's friend Sheldon takes a role in boosting Mike's reputation, attributing a round of much-needed facility repairs to him. As the students begin to care, the teachers sense that something is going on.

Paul and Sheldon publish a newsletter, The Otis Report, which praises Mike and criticizes the school staff, and distribute it in the halls while wearing masks and speeding past on roller skates. Mike is stripped of his position, but the pair respond with a campaign to reinstate him that sparks genuine interest among the student body.

Finding that the home address for Mike in the school files is fake, Paul and Sheldon find his actual residence and learn by eavesdropping that he is about to fail one of his courses. Since a large portion of the student body now idolizes Mike, they collaborate to produce a project for him. It is of such high quality that it is entered in a science fair, but the judges disqualify Mike after learning that the work is not his; the students react so badly that Don Carey is banned from the event. An announcement that Mike likes basketball leads to massive turnout at an away game, which Don Carey wins by one point, resulting in a joyous riot and much destruction.

The staff gives in and reinstates Mike as student body president, but he shocks everyone with the news that he will be leaving. Nevertheless, the students organize a huge going-away party in his honor.

== Cast of characters ==
=== Main ===
- Paul Abrams (16) – new student, recent immigrant from Saskatoon, Saskatchewan.
- Sheldon Pryor – Paul's best friend that is always with him and does everything he does and plans. Keeps dragging Paul to restaurants that serve food he cannot stand.
- Michael "Mike" Otis (17) – A reclusive student. He is a senior (b. April 1, 1968), but his origins are a mystery and his motivations even more obscure.

=== Students ===
- Feldstein – The school's "Locker Baron," who runs an unofficial black market in student locker assignments and is always ready to make a deal.

=== Teachers ===
- Mr. Arthur Morrison – homeroom teacher, guidance, optimist
- Mr. Willis – Photography, sprains his ankle on a Mike Otis poster, then gets really aggravated when his students make speeches in class praising Mike Otis.
- Principal – no one knows his real name, and as long as he gets to read the morning announcements, he cares the least about what's going on at his school.

=== Paul's Family ===
- Mr. Abrams – Paul's father who is ecstatic when Paul turns 16 and is ready to usher him into manhood by getting him a driving license whether he wants it or not.
- Mrs. Abrams – Paul's mother who is clueless about her son and is a total slave to her sister Nancy, who lives on Long Island.
- Auntie Nancy – the true head of the Abrams family. She pushed them into moving to New York in the first place and has no scruples about disrupting their lives whenever she wants or needs something, which is almost all the time.

== Reception ==
Kirkus Reviews found the book's premise — "that an empty idol could be powerful enough to transform radically an entire community" — to be "interesting and potentially gripping", but overall faulted the "arch, overly wordy prose" and "exaggeration which is so unbelievable as to be silly", concluding that the book did not meet the standards set by Korman's earlier works.

Orson Scott Card reviewed the novel for The Magazine of Fantasy and Science Fiction, specifying that although it has no magic, "it's a fantasy the way Ferris Bueller's Day Off is a fantasy: you know that reality doesn't work this way." Card stated that although "(n)ot one thing that happens in the story is believable", it is nonetheless "funny and imaginative"; he particularly lauded Korman's depiction of "political power. Where it comes from, how it's used, and how easily people are manipulated."
