= I Don't Really Care =

I Don't Really Care may refer to:

- "I Don't Really Care" (K-Gee song), 2000
- "I Don't Really Care" (Waka Flocka Flame song), 2012
- "I Don't Really Care", a song by French Montana from They Got Amnesia, 2021
- "I Don't Really Care", a song by L.V. Johnson from We Belong Together, 1981

== See also ==
- Don't Really Care (disambiguation)
