= Don't Really Care =

Don't Really Care may refer to:

- "Don't Really Care", a song by Chingy from Powerballin', 2004
- "Don't Really Care", a song by The Exploited from Death Before Dishonour, 1987
- "She Don't Really Care", a song by Alicia Keys from Here, 2016

== See also ==
- I Don't Really Care (disambiguation)
- "Really Don't Care", a 2014 single by Demi Lovato
