= The Zucchini Warriors =

1988 novel by Gordon Korman

- First hardback edition
- Author: Gordon Korman
- Cover artist: Richard Lauter; Yuksel Hassan (2004 ed)
- Language: English
- Series: Bruno & Boots
- Publisher: Scholastic Publishing
- Publication date: September 1988
- Media type: Print (Hardcover, Paperback)
- Pages: 198
- ISBN: 059041335X
- Dewey Decimal: jC813'.54
- LC Class: P7Z.K8369Zu
- Preceded by: The War with Mr. Wizzle
- Followed by: Macdonald Hall Goes Hollywood

The Zucchini Warriors is a young adult novel by Gordon Korman.

== Plot ==
Over the summer, Macdonald Hall has built an impressive football stadium on the north lawn, financed by an alumnus, zucchini magnate Henry 'Hank the Tank' Carson. Bruno and Boots are dismayed by this discovery, as they had been expecting a rec hall to be built with the money. A promise of a rec hall being built at the end of the football season by Carson soon has them on board. The team (the Macdonald Hall Zucchini Warriors) does poorly until Cathy Burton from neighboring school Miss Scrimmages slips into the team as quarterback. A ruse is concocted in which Elmer Drimsdale pretends to be quarterback, since the two are alike in height and build.

Drimsdale is also attempting to get four endangered Manchurian bush hamsters to reproduce. The four are voracious eaters. The students use them to help dispose of the many free zucchini sticks, in order not to hurt the feelings of Carson. Eventually they are released accidentally and take up residence in the stadium under the bleachers, eating the zucchini sticks tossed under the seats during games. The spices in the batter causes them to reproduce wildly, resulting in the population zooming to over 400.

Meanwhile, inspector Kevin Klapper, an ex-football addict, has come for a random inspection. He disapproves of the game and writes a scathing report. He too succumbs to the lure of the game and stalls, ignoring his job to help coach the team.

Eventually the team is set to win the Daw Cup. However, Kevin's boss, Mr, Greer, arrives to find out why he has missed work. He finds a scene of carnage in the guest cottage (result of a nosebleed by Sidney) and a draft of Kevin's original report. He concludes that Mr. Sturgeon has murdered him to prevent the report from being sent and contacts the police. Also Kevin's wife has discovered what he has really been doing with his time, and drives to the Hall to confront him. Both parties arrive at the same time, after the team has won and been presented with the cup. The sirens panic the hamsters and they swarm out from under the stands. Elmer hears them and rushes out onto the field. Cathy and he are seen at the same time and the game is up, literally. The trophy is confiscated by an official because of the Warriors having an "ineligible player". The other team wins by default.

The police arrive and Bruno is afraid that the police are there to arrest Mr. Sturgeon for this and confesses to the switch. On finding Kevin alive, Greer is first pleased and then angry, as is Kevin's wife. Carson, however, stands up to them and reveals that he has arranged for a coaching position for Kevin.

Mr. Sturgeon is somewhat angry with the team for the whole debacle, but accepts that a good deal was due to Cathy Burton's efforts. As punishment, he required the team to clean up the stadium, including the extensive hamster nest under the bleachers. Elmer is exempt, as per an agreement with Bruno he signed earlier, in exchange for participation in the quarterback switch.

== New characters ==
- Calvin 'The Beast' Fihzgart - A tough talking player who spends the majority of the season malingering.
- Myron Blakenship - A student who simply cannot keep from telling secrets.
- Dave Jackson - Student from Buffalo, New York.
- Henry 'Hank the Tank' Carson - Class of '58. A former football player turned millionaire businessman with a franchise of "Mr. Zucchini" snack wagons, selling battered deep-fried zucchini sticks. Still a student at heart.
- Kevin Klapper - Ontario Ministry of Education inspector. Married with two children. Extremely thin.
- Mr. Douglas Greer - Kevin's boss.

== Game scores ==
Home team	Opposing Team	Final score
Zucchini Warriors	St. Vincent Junior High Voles	37-36
Zucchini Warriors	?	21-2
Zucchini Warriors	Niagara Falls Chiefs	31-27
Zucchini Warriors	Kingston Junior High Kings (away game)	17-14
Zucchini Warriors	?	7-0
Zucchini Warriors	Panthers	27-24
Zucchini Warriors	Montrose Junior High Maulers	48-45

== Update ==
In 2004, an updated edition was published. Changes to the text were minor, the only difference being Kevin Klapper typing his report and letters on a laptop. It also included an excerpt from Macdonald Hall Goes Hollywood.
