= A Semester in the Life of a Garbage Bag =

1987 novel by Gordon Korman

- First edition
- Author: Gordon Korman
- Language: English
- Publisher: Scholastic Trade
- Publication date: August 1987
- Media type: Print (Hardcover, MMP)
- Pages: 257 pp
- ISBN: 0-590-40694-9
- LC Class: PZ7.K8369 Se 1987

A Semester in the Life of a Garbage Bag is a young adult novel by Gordon Korman, a Canadian-born author who now lives in New York City.

The main characters are Raymond Jardine and Sean Delancy. Sean is a popular student, a starter on the high school basketball team. Raymond Jardine is the man with no luck and therefore is constantly scheming to get to the Greek Island Theamelpos that he calls "the luck place", in order to cure his absence of luck.

== Plot ==
The plot of the novel revolves around Jardine bringing Sean Delancey, his English poetry project partner, into various schemes to ensure their arrival at Theamelpos for the summer. The central one of which involves winning an English-department contest based on their poetry unit. Along the way they encounter Ashley, a beautiful model who becomes the third member of their poetry project, and Cementhead (Steve Semenski), the luckiest student in the school. Sean and Raymond eventually ask Sean's grandfather to impersonate a (fictional) virtually-unknown poet, Gavin Gunhold, in order to bolster their poetry project for English class.

A subplot revolves around the unmasking the school administration's coverups regarding a local government contract to use the school as a testbed for SACGEN (Solar Air Current GENerator), a (fictional) stand-alone power system project that is supposed to power the school using only renewable energy. The school building was disconnected from the electric power grid, and its central core was gutted to house the control room and the storage batteries. Unfortunately, the project barely functions, causing frequent blackouts, leading the students to refer to it as "The Windmill."

Unbeknownst to Sean and Raymond, their English teacher had removed the only bibliographical proof of Gunhold's demise from the local library in order to see how far they would go in their attempts to win the contest. This eventually leads to them conspiring with Sean's grandfather to demonstrate the unreliability of "The Windmill" by inviting the local news media to a poetry recitation at the school. Determined to continue the coverup, the school principal and government officials in charge of the project disregard the system engineer's warnings, leading to the catastrophic failure and subsequent explosion of the SACGEN unit.

Following the demise of the SACGEN unit, and the unmasking of the student's forgeries of additional poems by Gunhold, the principal awards Sean and Raymond with the prize trip to Theamelpos in order to make them unavailable for comment during the construction of SACGEN-II.

== Reception ==
A review in Canadian Family said the book was "a classic tale of teenage scheming" which "will keep readers laughing and engaged throughout". Tanya Boudreau of CM Magazine gave the book 3 out of 4 stars, opining that "Raymond and Sean are likeable, well-rounded characters who have memorable personalities and quirks".
