= 64th Golden Globe Awards =

Film award ceremony in 2007

- Date: January 15, 2007
- Site: Beverly Hilton Hotel; Beverly Hills, Los Angeles, California

Highlights
- Best Film: Drama: Babel
- Best Film: Musical or Comedy: Dreamgirls
- Best Drama Series: Grey's Anatomy
- Best Musical or Comedy Series: Ugly Betty
- Best Miniseries or Television movie: Elizabeth I
- Most awards: (3) Dreamgirls
- Most nominations: (7) Babel

Television coverage
- Network: NBC

The 64th Golden Globe Awards honored the best in film and American television of 2006, as chosen by the Hollywood Foreign Press Association (HFPA). The ceremony was held on January 15, 2007, from the Beverly Hilton Hotel in Beverly Hills, California and were broadcast on NBC in the United States. Indicating the impact that animated films have had on the film industry, the Hollywood Foreign Press Association announced in early 2006 that a Golden Globe would be awarded for the Best Animated Feature for the first time at this award ceremony.

Dreamgirls won the most awards, with 3 (including Best Motion Picture – Musical or Comedy). Babel, received the most nominations, with 7 (only winning 1, for Best Motion Picture – Drama).

== Winners and nominees ==
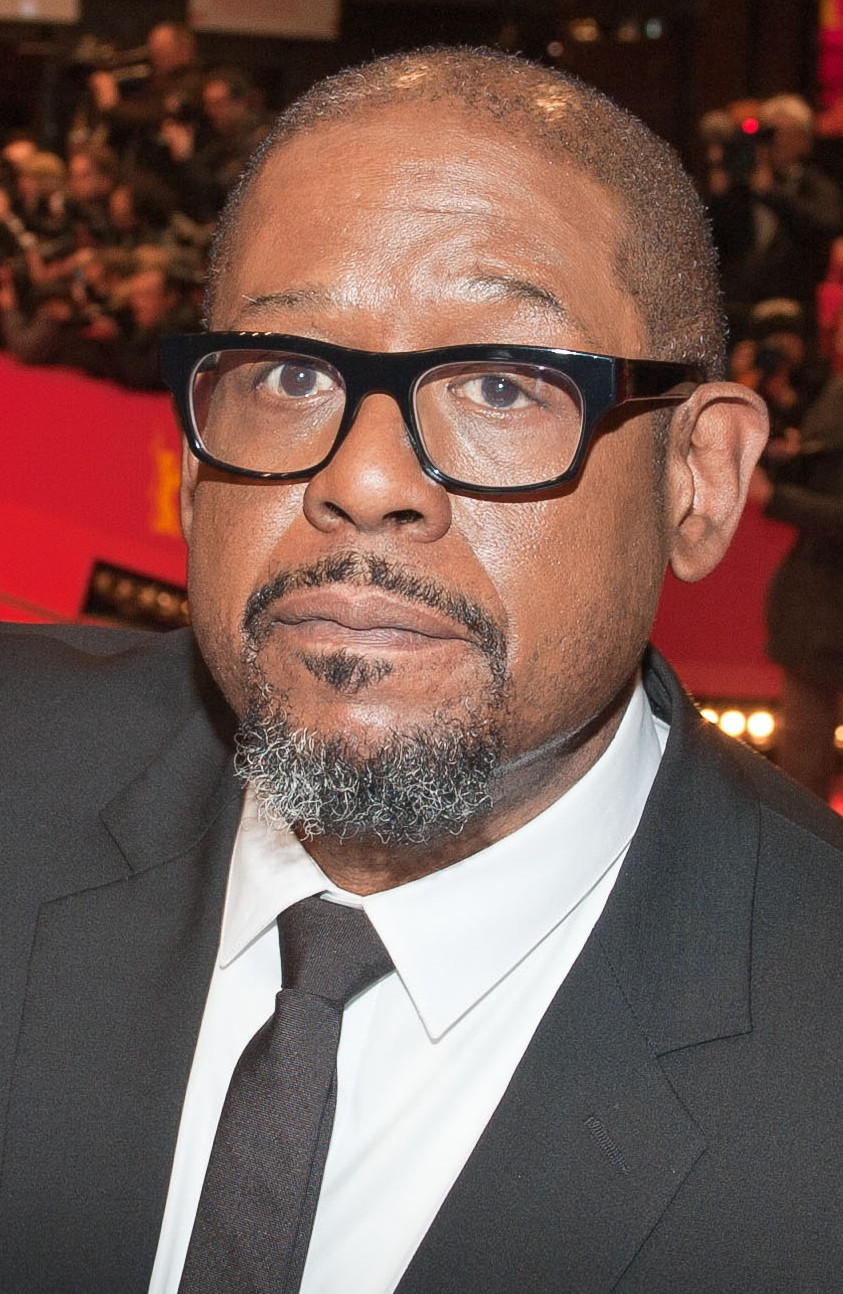
Forest Whitaker, Best Actor in a Motion Picture – Drama winner

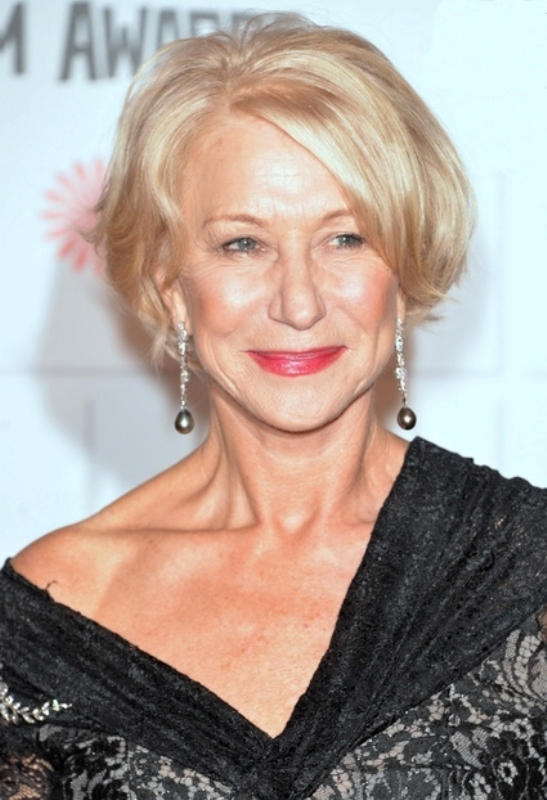
Helen Mirren, Best Actress in a Motion Picture – Drama winner and Best Actress in a Miniseries or Television Film winner

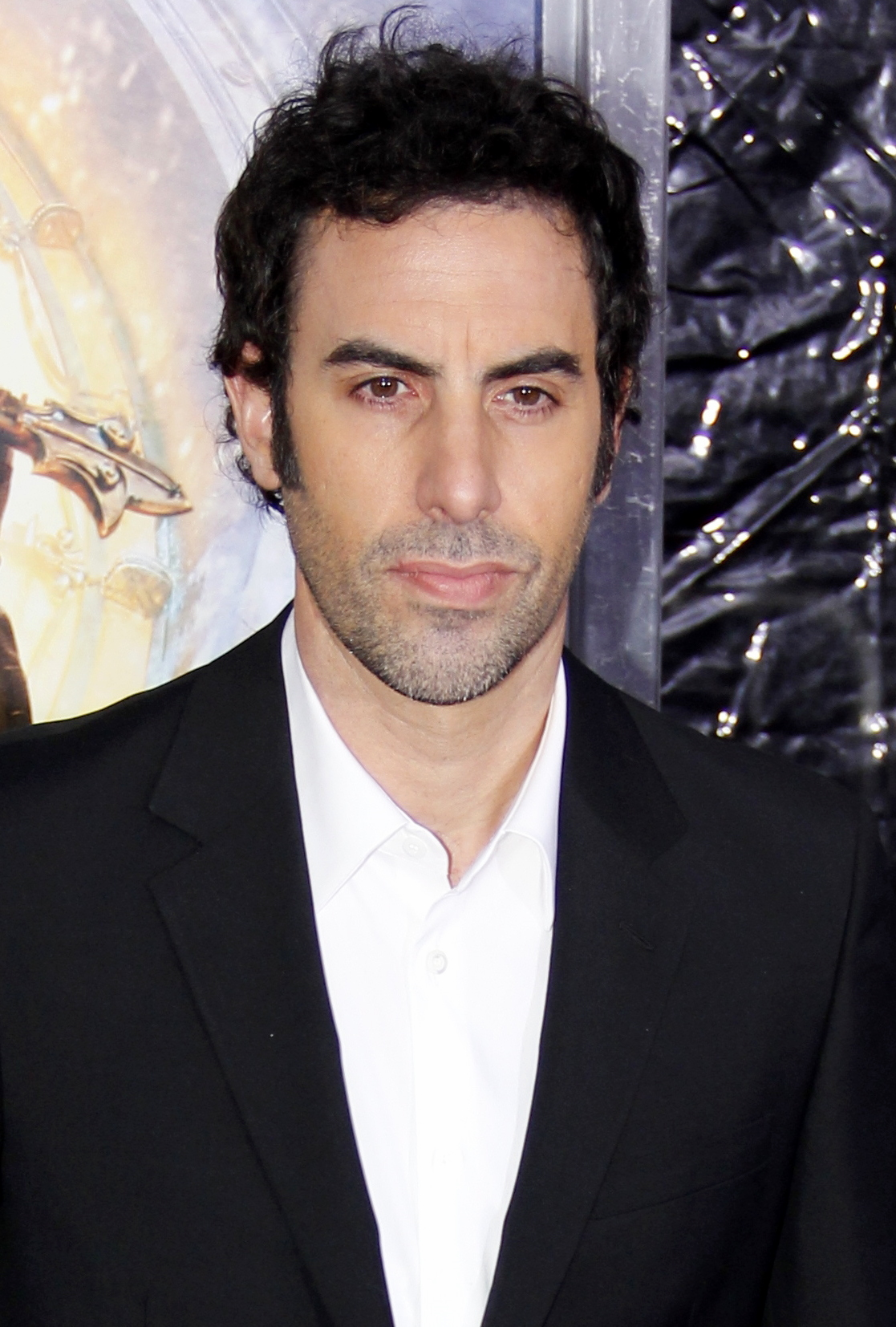
Sacha Baron Cohen, Best Actor in a Motion Picture – Musical or Comedy winner

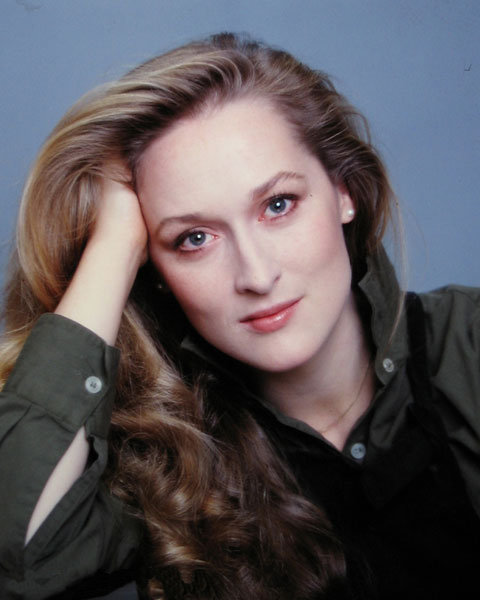
Meryl Streep, Best Actress in a Motion Picture – Musical or Comedy winner

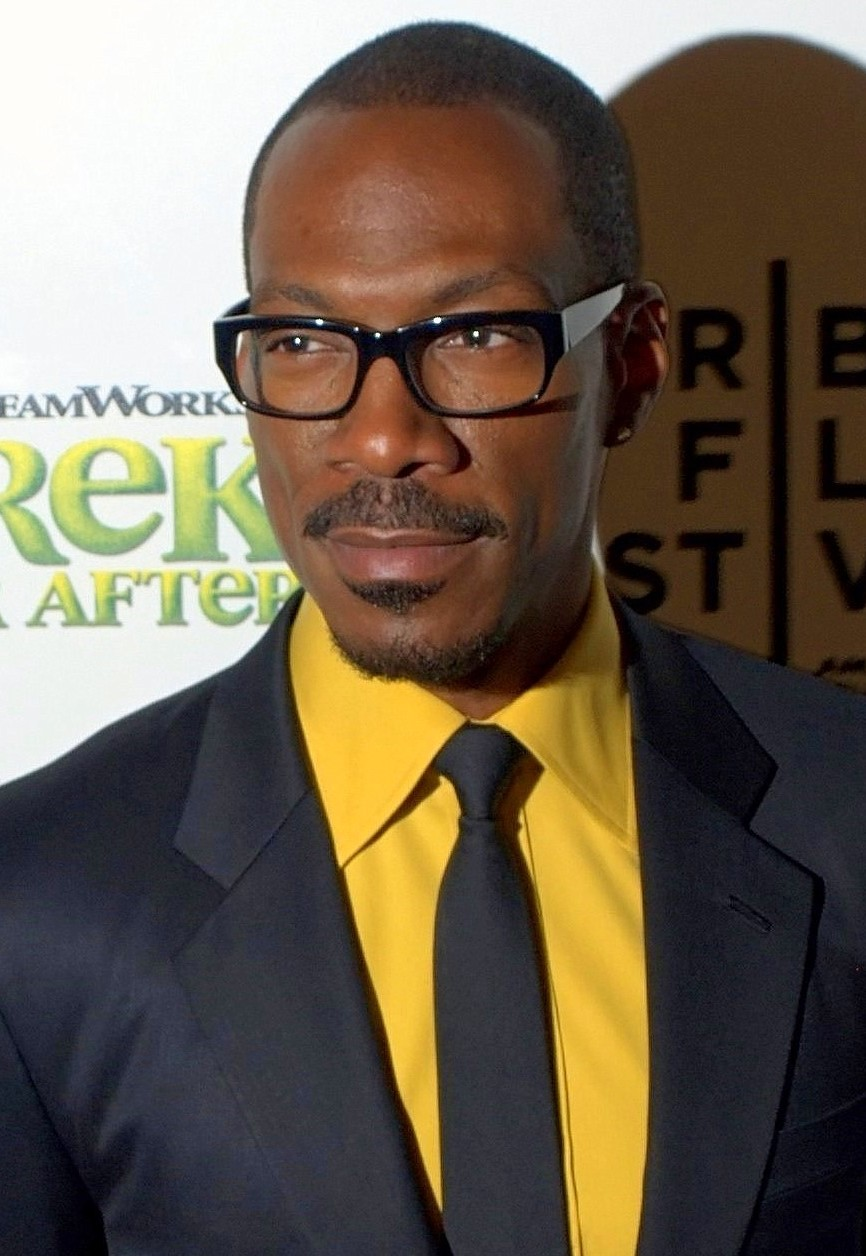
Eddie Murphy, Best Supporting Actor winner

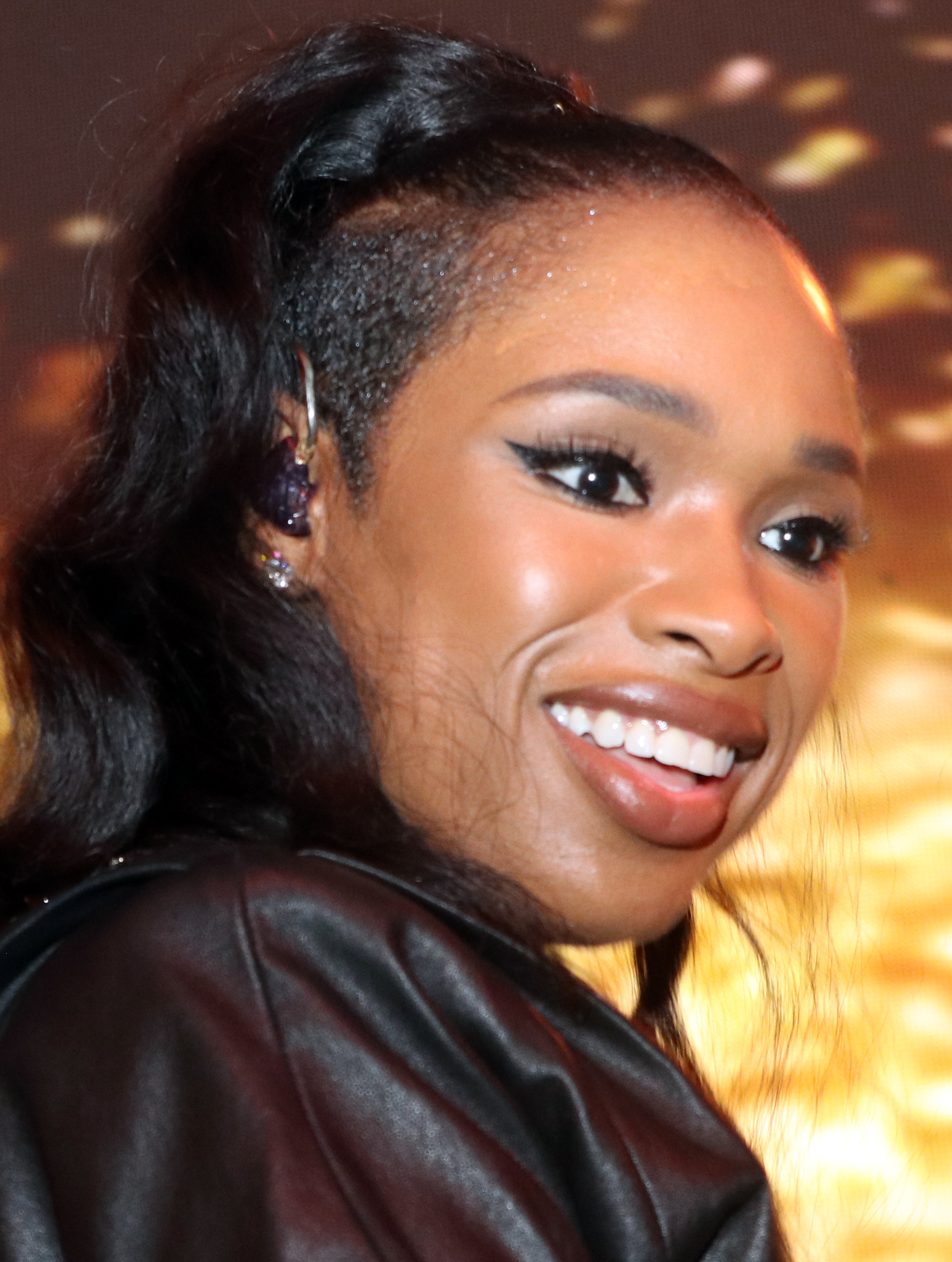
Jennifer Hudson, Best Supporting Actress winner

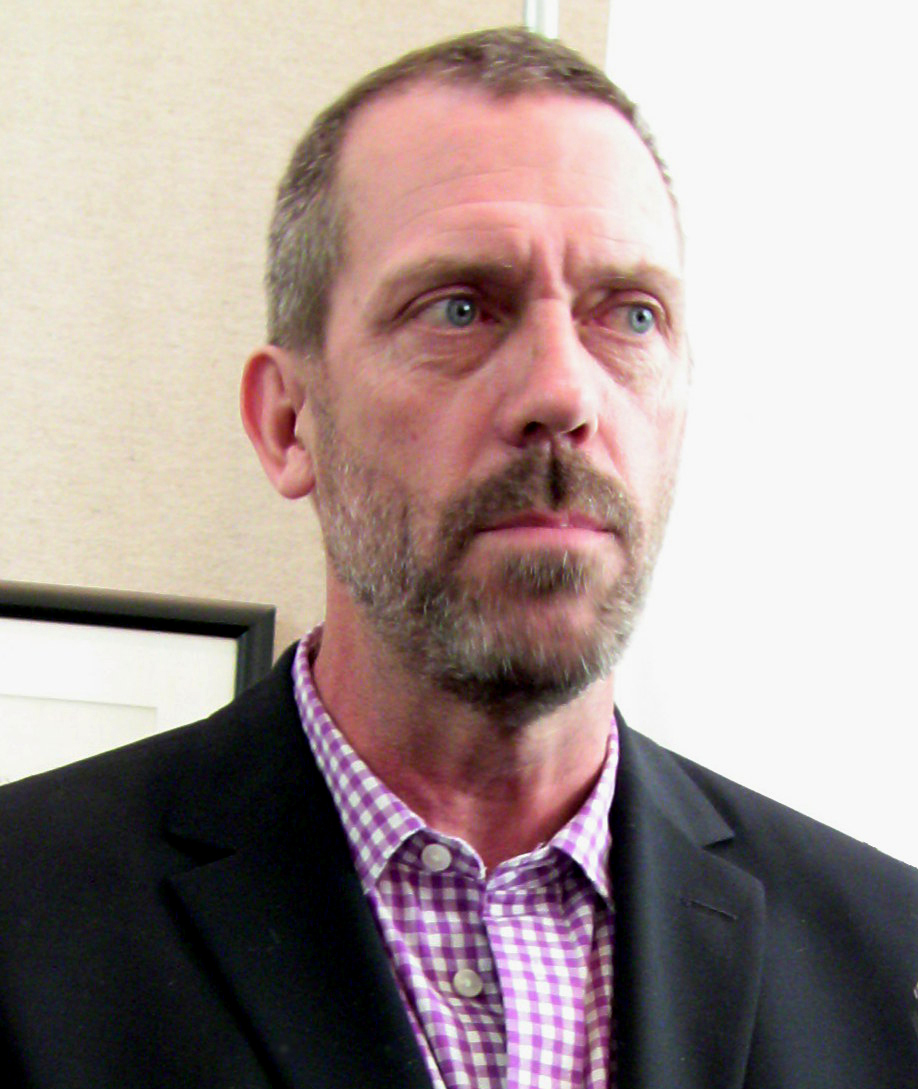
Hugh Laurie, Best Actor in a Television Series – Drama winner

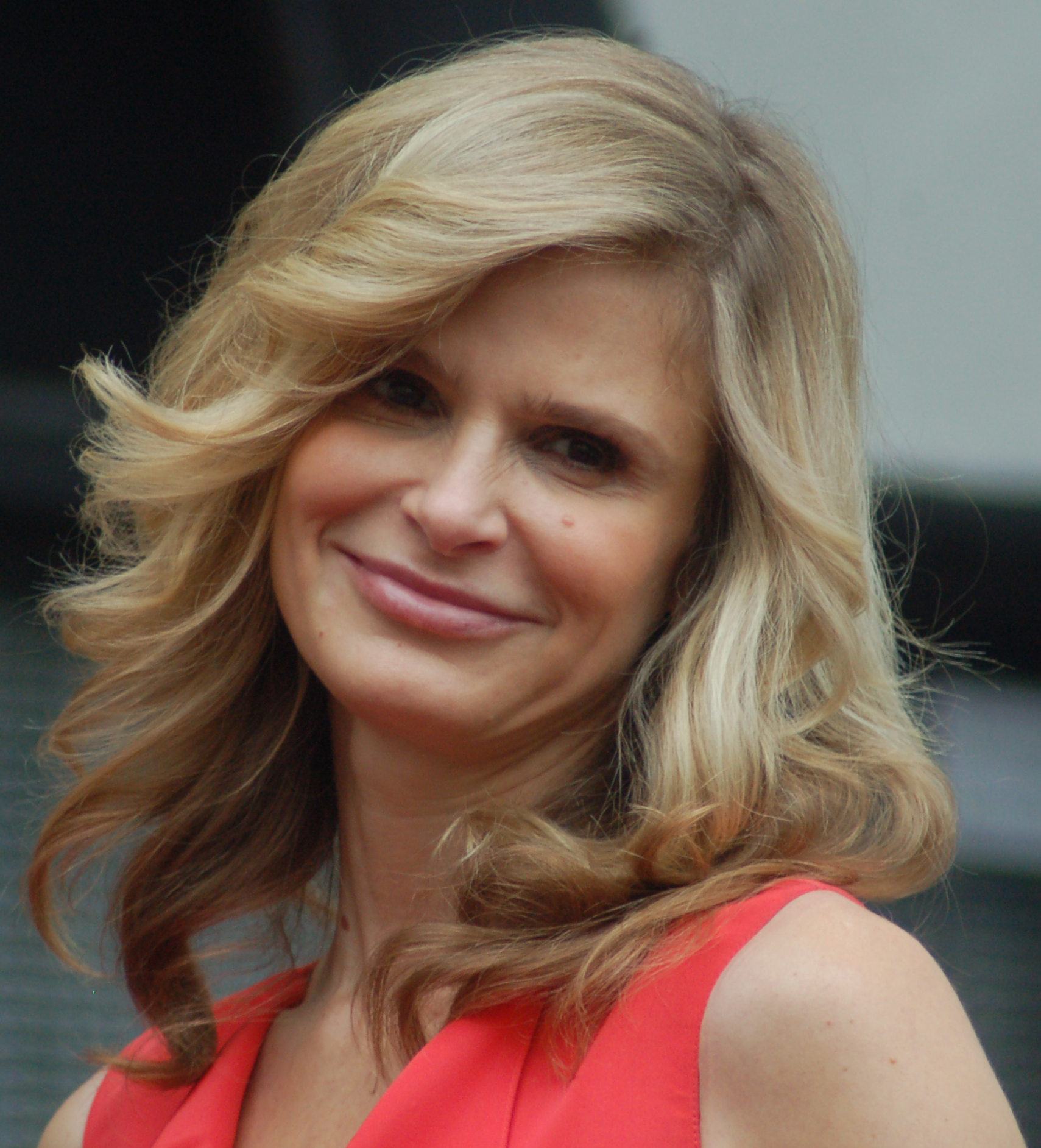
Kyra Sedgwick, Best Actress in a Television Series – Drama winner

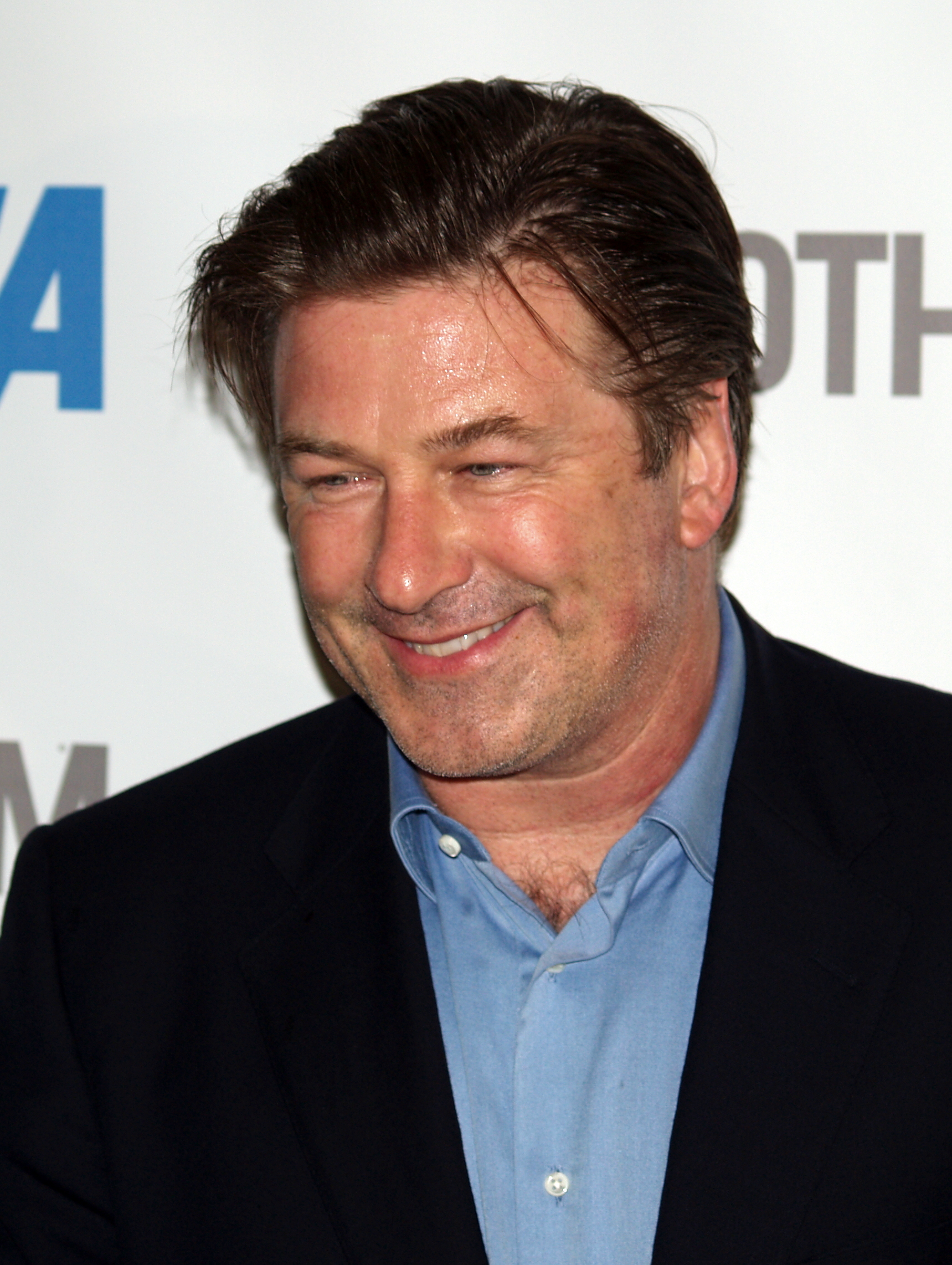
Alec Baldwin, Best Actor in a Television Series – Comedy or Musical winner

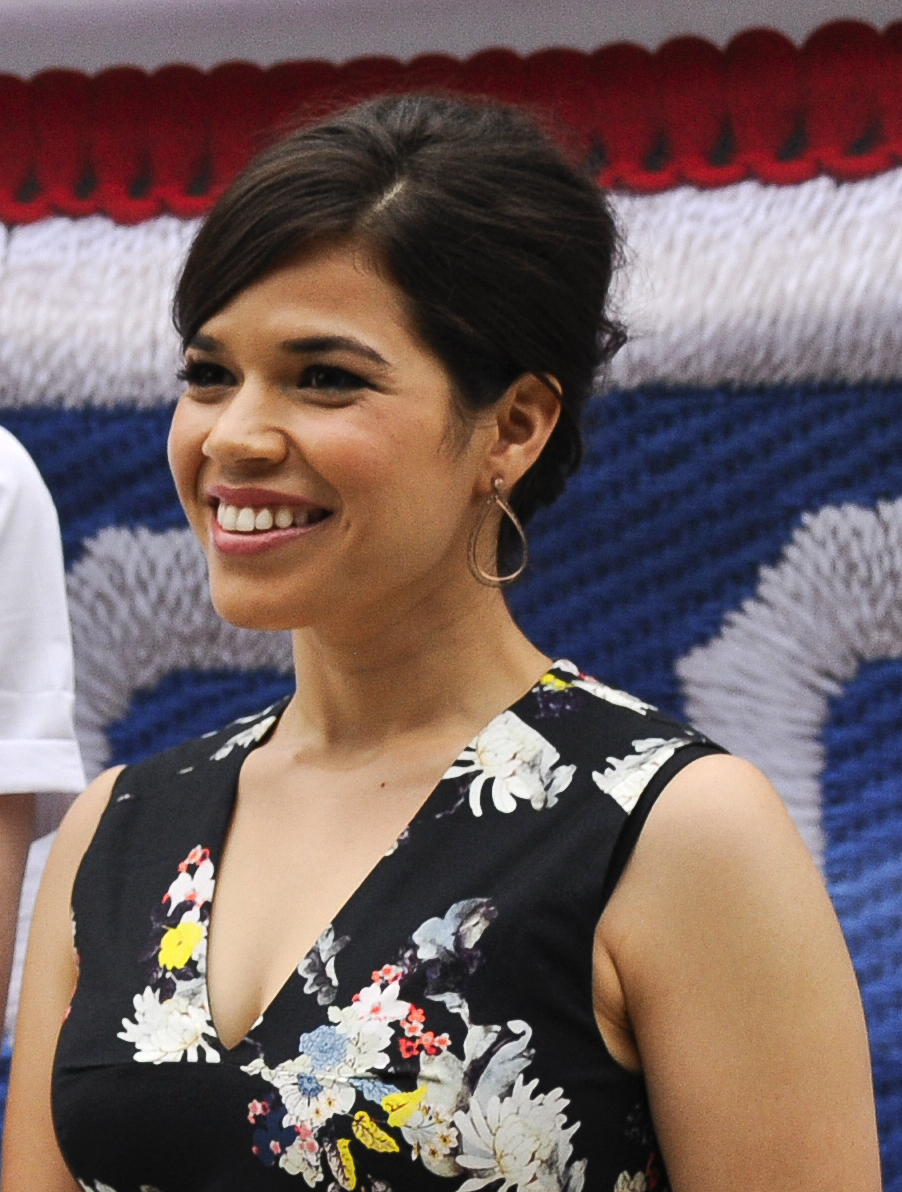
America Ferrera, Best Actress in a Television Series – Comedy or Musical winner

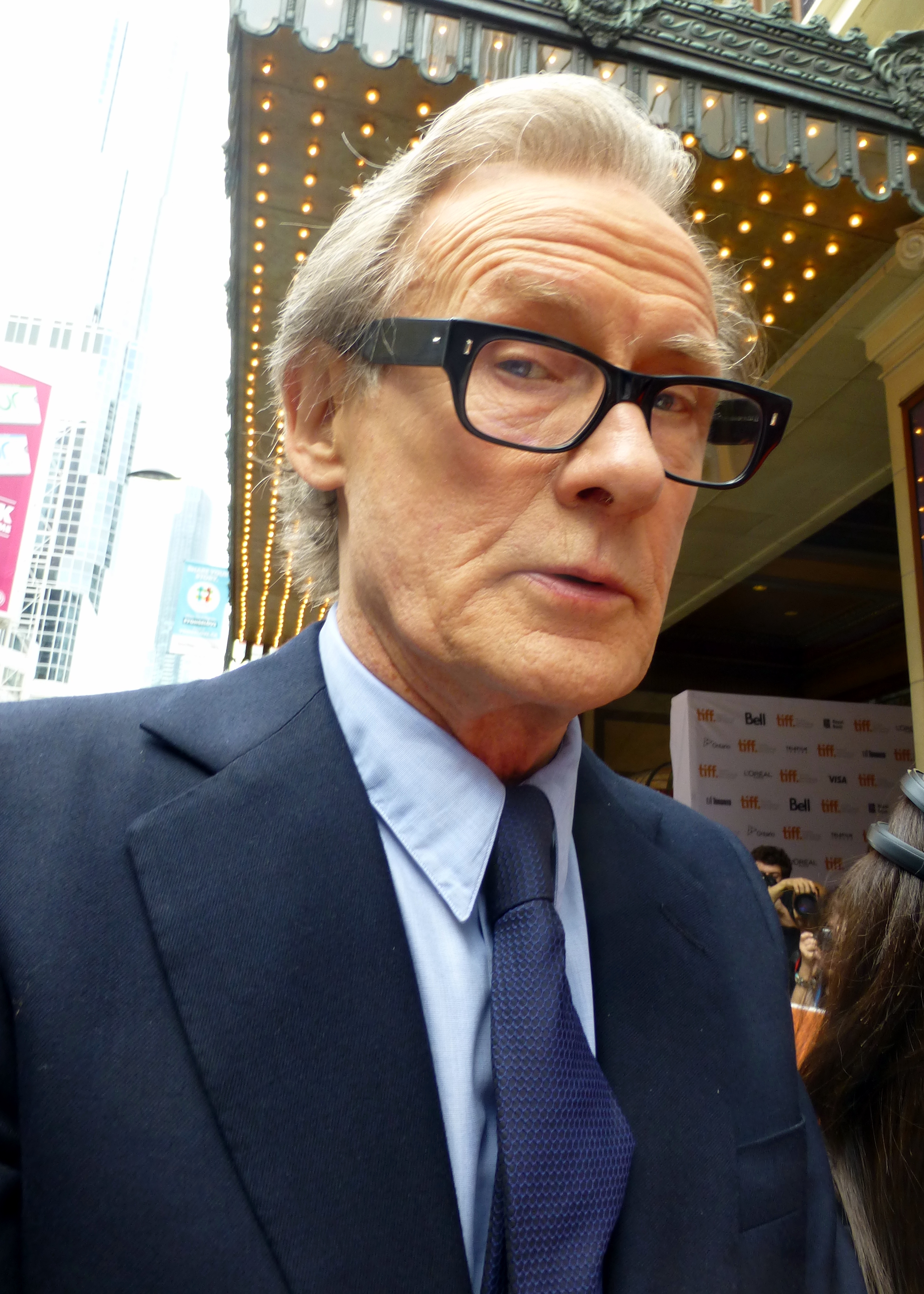
Bill Nighy, Best Actor in a Miniseries or Television Film winner

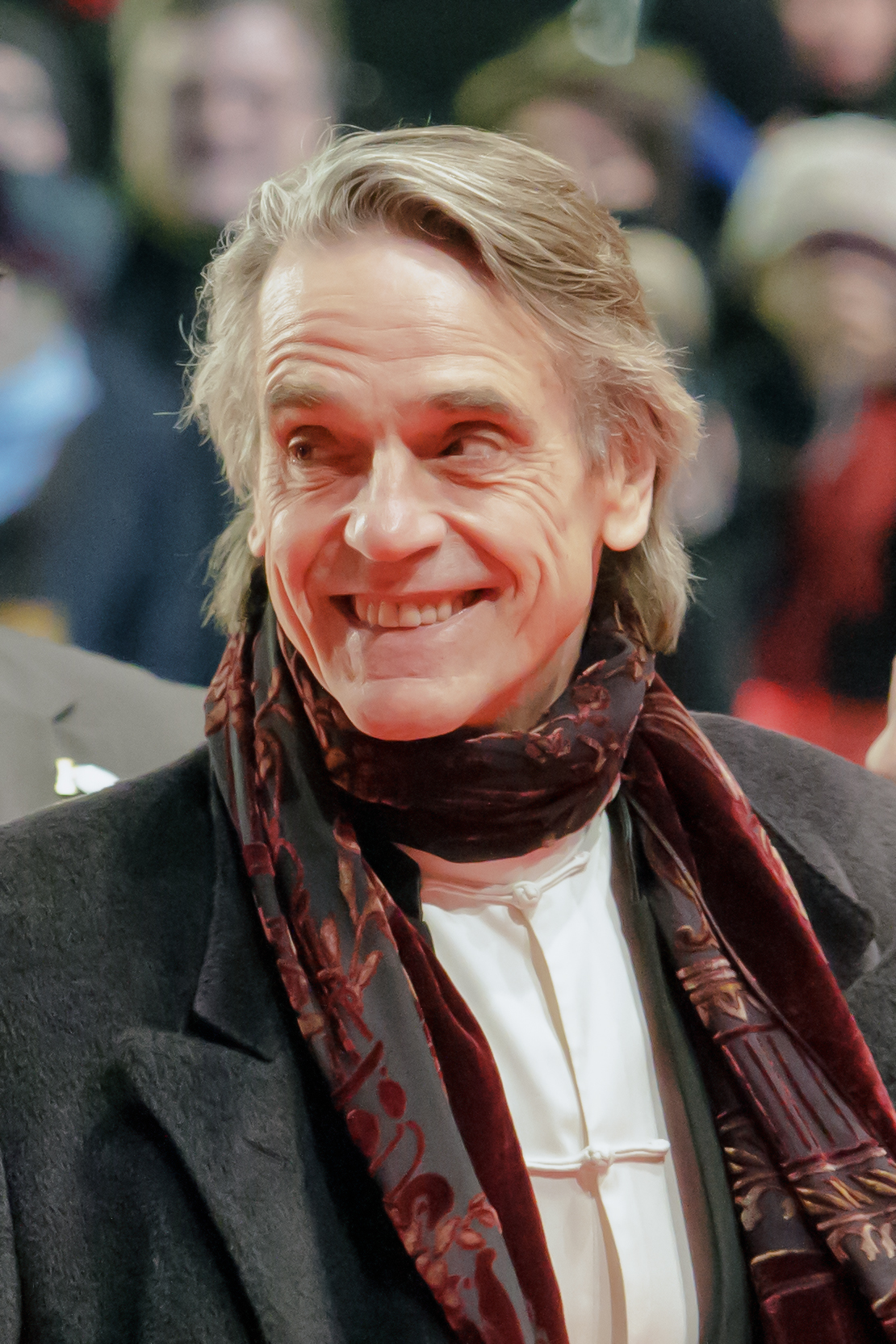
Jeremy Irons, Best Supporting Actor in a Series, Miniseries, or Television Film winner

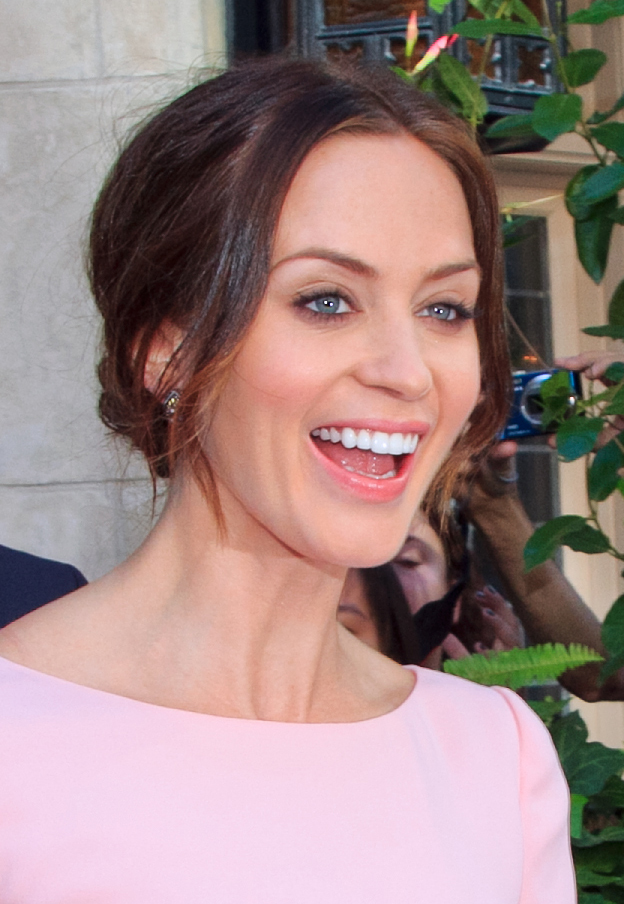
Emily Blunt, Best Supporting Actress in a Series, Miniseries, or Television Film winner

These are the nominees for the 64th Golden Globe Awards. Winners are listed at the top of each list.

Nominations announced on December 14, 2006.

=== Film ===
Best Motion Picture
Drama	Musical or Comedy
Babel; Bobby; The Departed; Little Children; The Queen	Dreamgirls; Borat: Cultural Learnings of America for Make Benefit Glorious Nation of Kazakhstan; The Devil Wears Prada; Little Miss Sunshine; Thank You for Smoking
Best Performance by an Actor in a Motion Picture – Drama	Best Performance by an Actress in a Motion Picture – Drama
Forest Whitaker – The Last King of Scotland as Idi Amin; Leonardo DiCaprio – The Departed as William "Billy" Costigan, Jr.; Leonardo DiCaprio – Blood Diamond as Danny Archer; Peter O'Toole – Venus as Maurice Russell; Will Smith – The Pursuit of Happyness as Chris Gardner	Helen Mirren – The Queen as The Queen; Penélope Cruz – Volver as Raimunda; Judi Dench – Notes on a Scandal as Barbara Covett; Maggie Gyllenhaal – Sherrybaby as Sherry Swanson; Kate Winslet – Little Children as Sarah Pierce
Best Performance by an Actor in a Motion Picture – Musical or Comedy	Best Performance by an Actress in a Motion Picture – Musical or Comedy
Sacha Baron Cohen – Borat: Cultural Learnings of America for Make Benefit Glorious Nation of Kazakhstan as Borat Sagdiyev; Johnny Depp – Pirates of the Caribbean: Dead Man's Chest as Captain Jack Sparrow; Aaron Eckhart – Thank You for Smoking as Nick Naylor; Chiwetel Ejiofor – Kinky Boots as Simon / Lola; Will Ferrell – Stranger than Fiction as Harold Crick	Meryl Streep – The Devil Wears Prada as Miranda Priestly; Annette Bening – Running with Scissors as Deirdre Burroughs; Beyoncé – Dreamgirls as Deena Jones; Toni Collette – Little Miss Sunshine as Sheryl Hoover; Renée Zellweger – Miss Potter as Beatrix Potter
Best Performance by an Actor in a Supporting Role in a Motion Picture	Best Performance by an Actress in a Supporting Role in a Motion Picture
Eddie Murphy – Dreamgirls as Jimmy "Thunder" Early; Ben Affleck – Hollywoodland as George Reeves; Jack Nicholson – The Departed as Francis "Frank" Costello; Brad Pitt – Babel as Richard Jones; Mark Wahlberg – The Departed as Staff Sgt. Sean Dignam	Jennifer Hudson – Dreamgirls as Effie Melody White; Adriana Barraza – Babel as Amelia; Cate Blanchett – Notes on a Scandal as Bathsheba "Sheba" Hart; Emily Blunt – The Devil Wears Prada as Emily Charlton; Rinko Kikuchi – Babel as Chieko Wataya
Best Director – Motion Picture	Best Screenplay – Motion Picture
Martin Scorsese – The Departed; Clint Eastwood – Flags of Our Fathers; Clint Eastwood – Letters from Iwo Jima; Stephen Frears – The Queen; Alejandro González Iñárritu – Babel	The Queen – Peter Morgan; Babel – Guillermo Arriaga; The Departed – William Monahan; Little Children – Todd Field and Tom Perrotta; Notes on a Scandal – Patrick Marber
Best Original Song – Motion Picture	Best Original Score – Motion Picture
Happy Feet – ("The Song of the Heart") – Prince; Bobby – ("Never Gonna Break My Faith") – Bryan Adams, Eliot Kennedy, and Andrea Remanda; Dreamgirls – ("Listen") – Scott Cutler, Beyoncé, Henry Krieger, and Anne Preven; Home of the Brave – ("Try Not to Remember") – Sheryl Crow; The Pursuit of Happyness – ("A Father's Way") – Seal and Christopher Bruce	The Painted Veil – Alexandre Desplat; Babel – Gustavo Santaolalla; The Da Vinci Code – Hans Zimmer; The Fountain – Clint Mansell; Nomad – Carlo Siliotto
Best Foreign Language Film	Best Animated Film
Letters from Iwo Jima – Clint Eastwood; Apocalypto – Mel Gibson; The Lives of Others – Florian Henckel von Donnersmarck; Pan's Labyrinth – Guillermo del Toro; Volver – Pedro Almodóvar	Cars – John Lasseter and Joe Ranft; Happy Feet – George Miller; Monster House – Gil Kenan

=== Television ===
Best Television Series
Drama	Musical or Comedy
Grey's Anatomy (ABC); 24 (Fox); Big Love (HBO); Heroes (NBC); Lost (ABC)	Ugly Betty (ABC); Desperate Housewives (ABC); Entourage (HBO); The Office (NBC); Weeds (Showtime)
Best Performance in a Television Series – Drama
Actor	Actress
Hugh Laurie – House (Fox) as Dr. Gregory House; Patrick Dempsey – Grey's Anatomy (ABC) as Dr. Derek Shepherd; Michael C. Hall – Dexter (Showtime) as Dexter Morgan; Bill Paxton – Big Love (HBO) as Bill Henrickson; Kiefer Sutherland – 24 (Fox) as Jack Bauer	Kyra Sedgwick – The Closer (TNT) as Deputy Chief Brenda Leigh Johnson; Patricia Arquette – Medium (NBC) as Allison DuBois; Edie Falco – The Sopranos (HBO) as Carmela Soprano; Evangeline Lilly – Lost (ABC) as Kate Austen; Ellen Pompeo – Grey's Anatomy (ABC) as Dr. Meredith Grey
Best Performance in a Television Series – Musical or Comedy
Actor	Actress
Alec Baldwin – 30 Rock (NBC) as Jack Donaghy; Zach Braff – Scrubs (NBC) as John Michael "J.D." Dorian; Steve Carell – The Office (NBC) as Michael Scott; Jason Lee – My Name Is Earl (NBC) as Earl Hickey; Tony Shalhoub – Monk (USA Network) as Adrian Monk	America Ferrera – Ugly Betty (ABC) as Betty Suarez; Marcia Cross – Desperate Housewives (ABC) as Bree Van de Kamp; Felicity Huffman – Desperate Housewives (ABC) as Lynette Scavo; Julia Louis-Dreyfus – The New Adventures of Old Christine (CBS) as Christine Campbell; Mary-Louise Parker – Weeds (Showtime) as Nancy Botwin
Best Performance in a Miniseries or Television Film
Actor	Actress
Bill Nighy – Gideon's Daughter (BBC America) as Gideon; Andre Braugher – Thief (FX) as Nick Atwater; Robert Duvall – Broken Trail (AMC) as Prentice "Prent" Ritter; Michael Ealy – Sleeper Cell (Showtime) as Darwyn Al-Sayeed; Chiwetel Ejiofor – Tsunami: The Aftermath (HBO) as Ian Carter; Ben Kingsley – Mrs. Harris (HBO) as Herman Tarnower; Matthew Perry – The Ron Clark Story (TNT) as Ron Clark	Helen Mirren – Elizabeth I (HBO) as Elizabeth I; Helen Mirren – Prime Suspect: The Final Act (PBS) as Det. Supt. Jane Tennison; Gillian Anderson – Bleak House (PBS) as Lady Dedlock; Annette Bening – Mrs. Harris (HBO) as Jean Harris; Sophie Okonedo – Tsunami: The Aftermath (HBO) as Susie Carter
Best Supporting Performance in a Series, Miniseries or Television Film
Supporting Actor	Supporting Actress
Jeremy Irons – Elizabeth I (HBO) as Earl of Leicester; Thomas Haden Church – Broken Trail (AMC) as Tom Harte; Justin Kirk – Weeds (Showtime) as Andy Botwin; Masi Oka – Heroes (NBC) as Hiro Nakamura; Jeremy Piven – Entourage (HBO) as Ari Gold	Emily Blunt – Gideon's Daughter (BBC America) as Natasha; Toni Collette – Tsunami: The Aftermath (HBO) as Kathy Graham; Katherine Heigl – Grey's Anatomy (ABC) as Dr. Izzie Stevens; Sarah Paulson – Studio 60 on the Sunset Strip (NBC) as Harriet Hayes; Elizabeth Perkins – Weeds (Showtime) as Celia Hodes
Best Miniseries or Television Film
Elizabeth I (HBO); Bleak House (PBS); Broken Trail (AMC); Mrs. Harris (HBO); Prime Suspect: The Final Act (PBS)

== Awards breakdown ==
The following films and programs received multiple nominations:

=== Film ===
Nominations	Title
7	Babel
6	The Departed
5	Dreamgirls
4	The Queen
3	Little Children
3	Notes on a Scandal
3	The Devil Wears Prada
2	Bobby
2	Borat: Cultural Learnings of America for Make Benefit Glorious Nation of Kazakhstan
2	Happy Feet
2	Letters from Iwa Jima
2	Little Miss Sunshine
2	Thank You for Smoking
2	The Pursuit of Happyness
2	Volver

=== Television ===
Nominations	Title
4	Grey's Anatomy
4	Weeds
3	Broken Trail
3	Desperate Housewives
3	Elizabeth I
3	Mrs. Harris
2	24
2	Big Love
2	Bleak House
2	Entourage
2	Gideon's Daughter
2	Heroes
2	Lost
2	Prime Suspect: The Final Act
2	The Office
2	Tsunami: The Aftermath
2	Ugly Betty

The following films and programs received multiple wins:

=== Film ===
Wins	Title
3	Dreamgirls
2	The Queen

=== Television ===
Wins	Title
3	Elizabeth I
2	Gideon's Daughter
2	Ugly Betty

== Ceremony ==
=== Presenters ===
- Tim Allen
- David Arquette
- Drew Barrymore
- Jessica Biel
- Steve Carell
- George Clooney
- Sean Combs
- Dane Cook
- Courteney Cox
- Geena Davis
- Cameron Diaz
- Tina Fey
- Jamie Foxx
- Jennifer Garner
- Hugh Grant
- Adrian Grenier
- Greg Grunberg
- Jake Gyllenhaal
- Tom Hanks
- Salma Hayek
- Jennifer Love Hewitt
- Dustin Hoffman
- Philip Seymour Hoffman
- Djimon Hounsou
- Terrence Howard
- Felicity Huffman
- Eva Longoria
- Jennifer Lopez
- Sienna Miller
- Masi Oka
- Hayden Panettiere
- Sarah Jessica Parker
- Joaquin Phoenix
- Arnold Schwarzenegger
- Charlie Sheen
- David Spade
- Steven Spielberg
- John Stamos
- Ben Stiller
- Sharon Stone
- Hilary Swank
- Justin Timberlake
- Milo Ventimiglia
- Naomi Watts
- Rachel Weisz
- Vanessa Williams
- Reese Witherspoon
- James Woods
- Renee Zellweger

=== Cecil B. DeMille Award ===
Warren Beatty

=== Miss Golden Globe ===
Lorraine Nicholson (daughter of Jack Nicholson & Rebecca Broussard)

== Isaiah Washington press conference controversy ==
At a backstage press conference following the awards ceremony, Isaiah Washington addressed a media report involving alleged homophobic remarks towards Grey's Anatomy co-star T. R. Knight, stating, "No, I did not call him a faggot." Knight's co-star, Katherine Heigl condemned Washington for his remarks at a Golden Globes afterparty. The resulting scandal led to Washington's exit from the show.

== See also ==
- 79th Academy Awards
- 27th Golden Raspberry Awards
- 13th Screen Actors Guild Awards
- 58th Primetime Emmy Awards
- 59th Primetime Emmy Awards
- 60th British Academy Film Awards
- 61st Tony Awards
- 2006 in film
- 2006 in American television
