= House system =

School system of dividing students into groups to foster loyalty

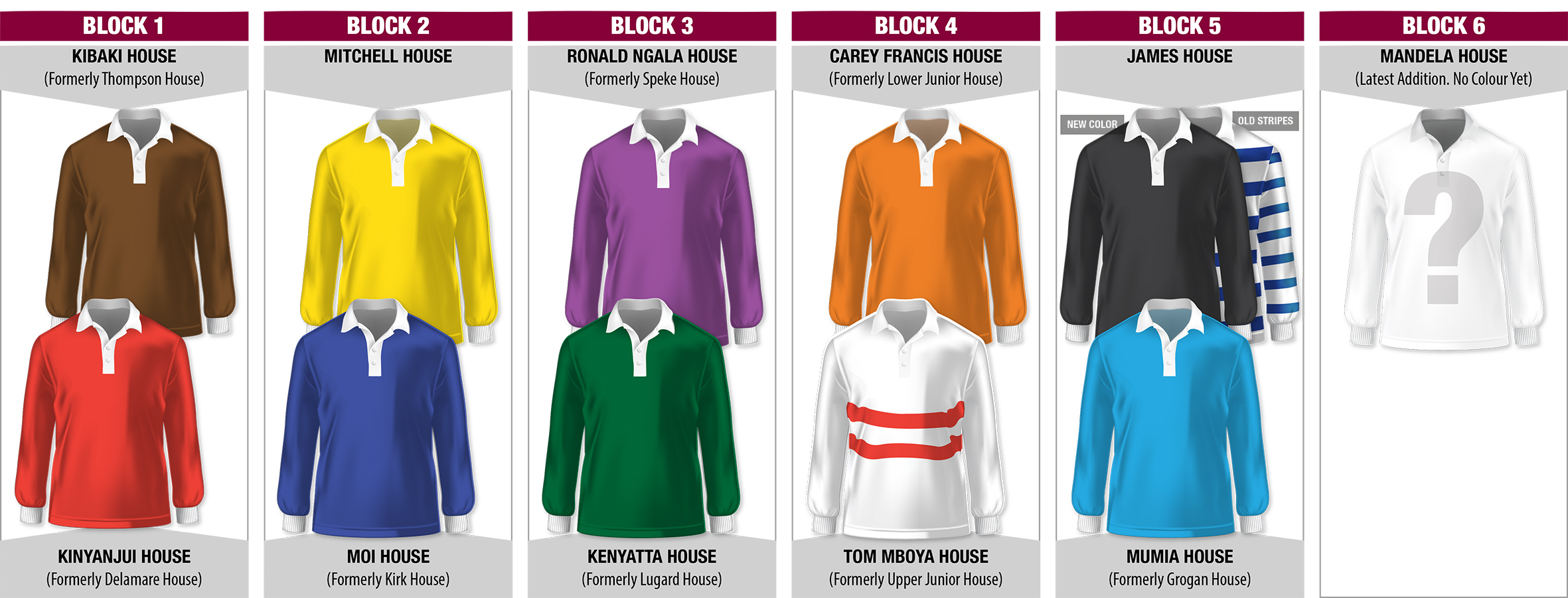
House uniform colours at Lenana School in Nairobi, Kenya

The house system is a traditional feature of schools in the United Kingdom. The practice has since spread to Commonwealth countries as well as other former British colonies. The school is divided into units called "houses" and each student is allocated to one house at the moment of enrollment. Houses may compete with one another in sport and in other ways, thus providing a focus for group loyalty.

Historically, the house system has been associated with public schools in England, especially boarding schools, where a "house" referred to a boarding house at the school. In this case, the housemaster or housemistress in charge of the house is in loco parentis to the pupils who live in it, even though the house normally has a separate "private side" in which they can live a family life. Such an arrangement still continues in most boarding schools, while in day schools the word house is likely to refer to a grouping of pupils, rather than to a particular building.

Schools have different numbers of houses, with different numbers of students in each, depending on the arrangements adopted by the schools. Facilities such as dining halls, exercise rooms, and at some schools chapels or other spaces for religious activity may be provided on a house basis.

Houses may be named after saints, famous historical alumni or notable regional topics (e.g. in international schools, houses are sometimes named in honour of local celebrities). Former British royal houses (dynasties) are also used in the UK. Other more arbitrary names—animal names or colours, for example—are also often used. Houses are also often referred to by the original name of the building or by the name or initials of the housemistress or housemaster. Each house will usually also be identified by its own symbol, logo, or colours.

At co-educational boarding schools, there may be separate houses for boys and girls, as at the Lawrenceville School, whose house system is itself based on that of Rugby School. Students may also be grouped by year groups or status as boarders or day students. At Winchester College and Eton College, there is a separate house for foundation scholars. Where the school has boarders and day pupils like the King's School, Canterbury or Shrewsbury School, they will often be allocated to separate houses. There have also been cases, for example at Cheltenham College, of pupils being allocated to different houses according to their religion. At traditional full boarding schools such as Radley College and Harrow School, students are grouped by boarding house.

== Pastoral care ==
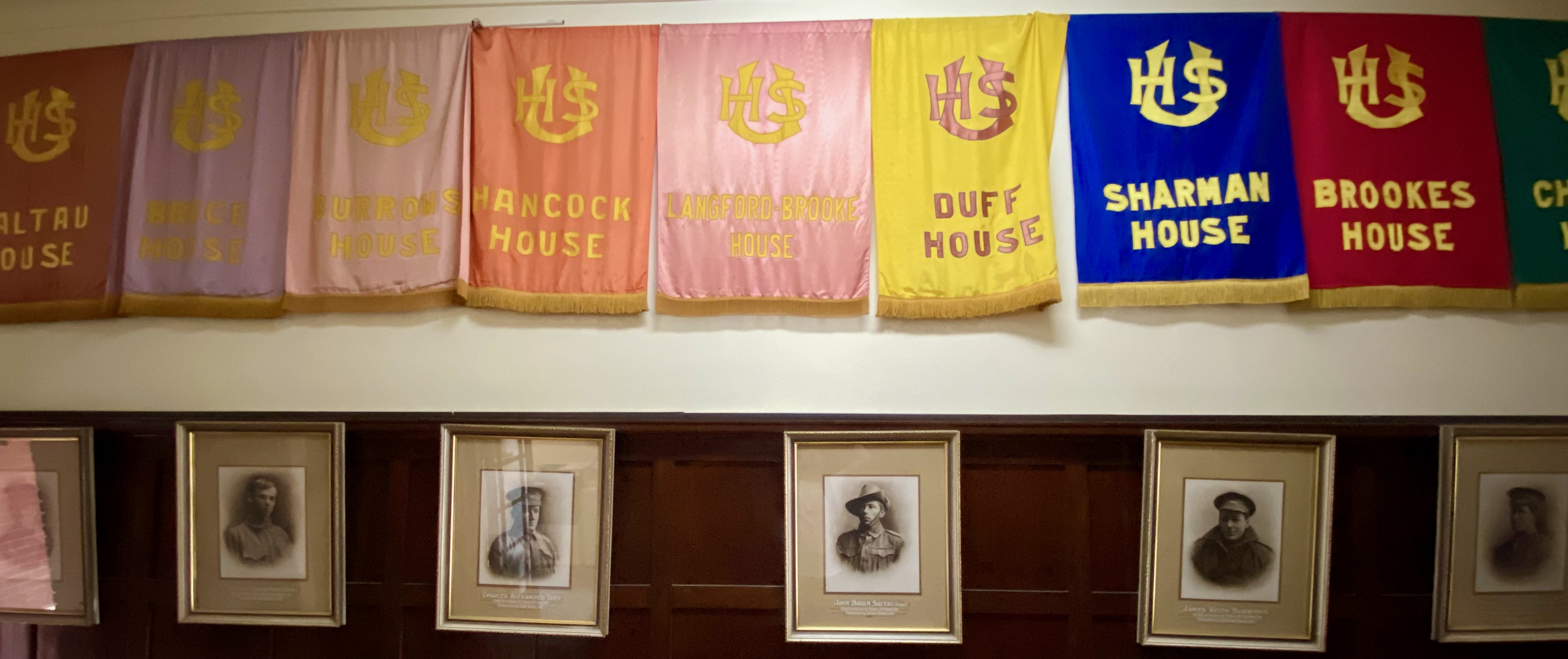
House banners at a public school in Australia

In some boarding schools, a primary purpose of the house system is to provide pastoral care to the students. Separated from parents for long periods, children will rely on the school to fulfil their socio-emotional needs, in addition to meeting their basic physical care. The smaller within-school structure of the house facilitates this, by promoting personalised care, with more frequent interactions, and lower child-to-adult-carer ratios, than within the wider school. Similar benefits of closer relationships between teachers and students may occur in day schools that use house systems for this purpose.

Peer relationships and fostering of community feeling are a similar aim of school house systems, whether in boarding or day schools. One headmaster of an English-style school – Brighton College Bangkok – David Tongue, writing in an editorial, described the team-spirit engendered by school houses this way: "This camaraderie and solidarity is second to none and the benefits of this vertical interaction, where the young look up to the elder and where the elder look out for and support the younger, are profound." In Britain, the Specialist Schools and Academies Trust [now SSAT (The Schools Network)], has endorsed use of House systems as one strategy for preventing the deterioration of children's educational and social progress, a common feature of transition from primary to secondary school.

== Competition between houses ==
A secondary feature of house systems is the competition between houses. For example, the traditional school sports day is usually an inter-house competition. Debating competitions and charity drives are also often organised along inter-house lines. Merit points for behaviour and academic achievement may also be totalled up for comparison between houses.

Some schools have a year-long programme of inter-house events, in a variety of fields but most often sports or the arts, in which each house "hosts" an event at which all houses compete, with points contributing to the award of the House Cup at the end of the year.

Shrewsbury School and Eton College still maintain an annual bumps race between houses, which was carried on by old boys to Oxford and Cambridge colleges, both of which still race in bumps; Shrewsbury and Eton race in fours, whilst Oxford and Cambridge race in eights.

St Bartholomew's School, one of England's oldest state schools, hosts a series of sporting and arts House competitions and between 2022-24 briefly added a House Film competition.

== Membership and roles ==
Pupils are usually assigned to houses randomly, perhaps with the aim of balancing the houses in order to increase competition. Sometimes the assignment is based on the social and emotional needs of the student and to ensure proper peer mentoring is enhanced with the right fit of students within a house. Traditionally, however, once a pupil has been assigned to a house, any younger siblings may automatically become members of that house when they arrive at the school, but this varies from school to school. (This tradition sometimes extends to the children of former pupils.) Once a pupil has been allocated to a house they usually stay with that house as they move up through the year groups. In some schools, pupils may move to a house for senior pupils in Sixth Form.

One notable feature of the house system is the appointment of house captains, and maybe other house prefects, who exercise limited authority within the house and assist in the organisation of the house as well as events. Large schools may have a house captain for each year group (with vice-captains in the largest schools).

In boarding schools, the term housemaster or housemistress is the title held by the member of staff responsible for pupils living in a particular house (or dormitory). In state schools, members of staff are appointed as (or volunteer to become) head of house. However, both terms can be used at either style of school for the sake of formality. In some cases, houses may have their own staff members other than housemaster or housemistress.

== Adoption by US K12 Schools ==
House systems have gained increasing popularity in the United States, particularly over the past two decades. One of the most prominent examples of its early adoption in U.S. schools is the Ron Clark Academy, which has become widely known for using a house system to promote school spirit, positive behavior, and a sense of belonging. The school's success has inspired many others to adopt similar systems.

Unlike the traditional British model, American schools often tailor their house systems to reflect local culture and community values. House names may reference regional icons, cultural themes, or school-specific values rather than historical figures or alumni. Additionally, the systems are often used to support behavior management and social-emotional learning, especially in K-12 settings.

== Other uses ==
The term "house system" is also used to refer to the residential college systems found in some US colleges and universities, such as Rice University, Caltech, Yale College, Harvard College, Notre Dame, and University of Chicago. These systems are based on the college systems of Oxford and Cambridge Universities in the United Kingdom, which in turn share many similarities with the house systems of British secondary schools.

== Prominence in school stories ==
The first boarding-school story was Sarah Fielding's The Governess, or The Little Female Academy, published in 1749. The genre did not become popular until 1857, with Thomas Hughes' novel Tom Brown's School Days. The house system has since featured prominently in thousands of school stories books, with many authors writing a whole series of books such as Chalet School and Malory Towers which have been published around the world and translated into several languages. The Harry Potter books and films (re)popularized this genre, and resulted in unprecedented awareness of British boarding schools (and their house systems) in countries where they were previously largely unknown.

These stories depict the popular conception of a British boarding school rather than how modern boarding schools work in reality, and often focus on the most positive aspects. For example, loyalty to one's house is very important in real-life houses, and features prominently in many of these books. The Harry Potter books have updated the boarding school to 21st-century values, for example by depicting mixed-sex education houses. Most Britons never went to a boarding school, but have integrated their values by reading these books.

The translators of some foreign editions of the Harry Potter books had difficulties conveying the "house" concept in languages like Russian or German, because there was no word that could adequately convey the importance of belonging to a certain house, the loyalty owed to one's house, and the pride in the prizes won by one's own house. This forced translators to insert extra explanations in the dialogue, which made some foreign readers think that the house and boarding systems were a special feature of the fantasy setting rather than a real-world feature which would not need to be explained to a typical British child. The French translation does not explain the differences between the French and English real-world boarding schools, instead having the house system and the head girls and boys explained as peculiarities of Hogwarts.

== See also ==
- School Council House System in Myanmar basic education schools (public schools)
- Harvard house system
- University of Notre Dame residence halls
- House System at the California Institute of Technology
- Hogwarts houses, fictional houses in Harry Potter books
