= 13th Screen Actors Guild Awards =

- Awarded for: Outstanding motion picture and primetime television performances
- Date: January 28, 2007
- Location: Shrine Auditorium; Los Angeles, California
- Country: United States
- Presented by: Screen Actors Guild
- Website: www.sagawards.org

Television/radio coverage
- Network: TNT and TBS simultaneous broadcast

The 13th Annual Screen Actors Guild Awards ceremony, honoring the best in American film and television acting achievement for the year 2006, took place on January 28, 2007, at the Los Angeles Shrine Exposition Center, in Los Angeles, California. It was the 11th consecutive year the ceremony was held at the center. The nominees were announced on January 4, 2007, and the award ceremony was televised live on TNT and TBS. 2007 was the 10th consecutive year TNT televised the event and the second year for TBS.

Babel, Dreamgirls and Little Miss Sunshine received the highest number of nominations among the film categories, with each getting three, two for acting and one for ensemble performance, however only Dreamgirls won more than one award. In the television categories The Sopranos and Broken Trail had the most nominations, with three but it was the mini-series Elizabeth I and the medical drama Grey's Anatomy which won the most awards, with two each. Helen Mirren became the first performer to win two individual awards in a single edition.

The Screen Actors Guild Life Achievement Award was presented to actress-singer Julie Andrews.

== Winners and nominees ==
Winners are listed first and highlighted in boldface.

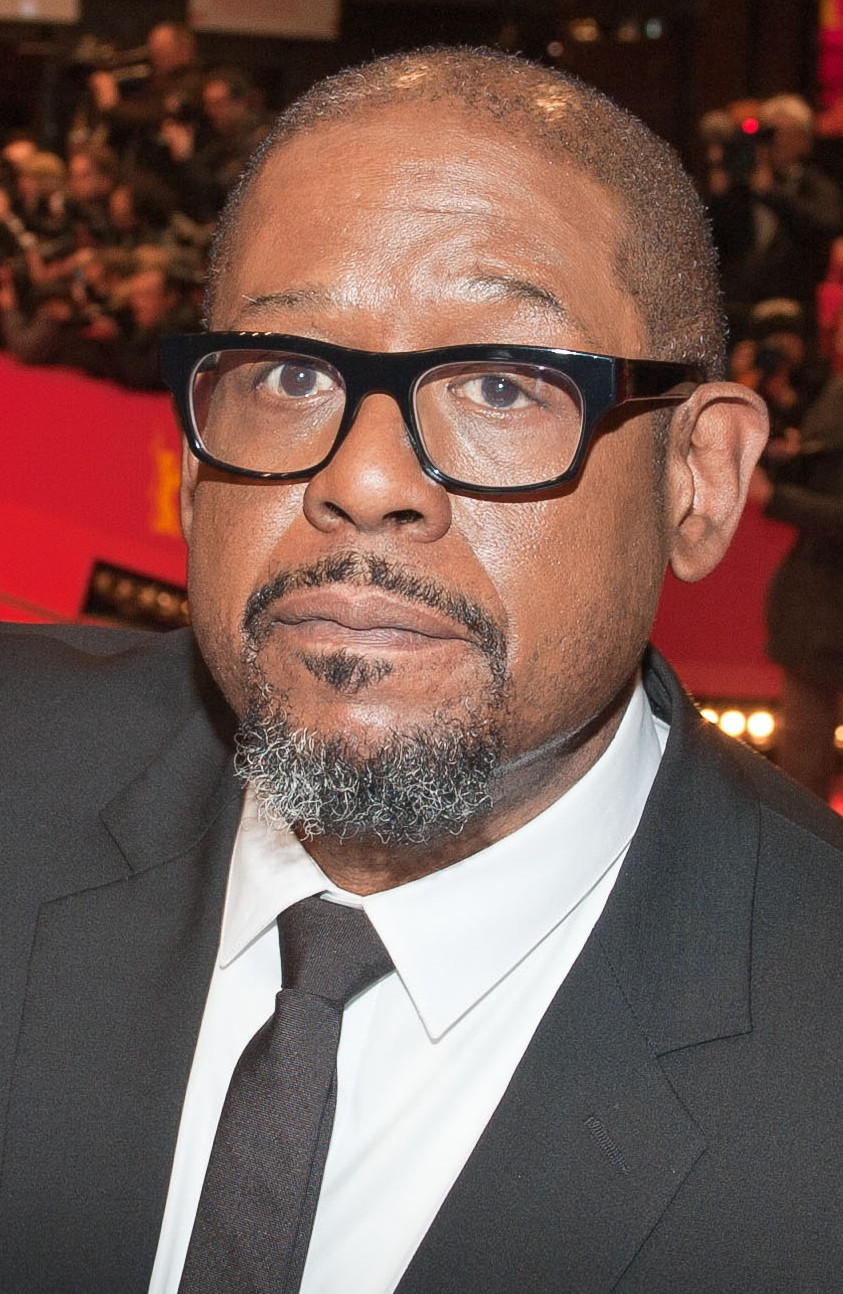
Forest Whitaker, Outstanding Performance by a Male Actor in a Leading Role winner

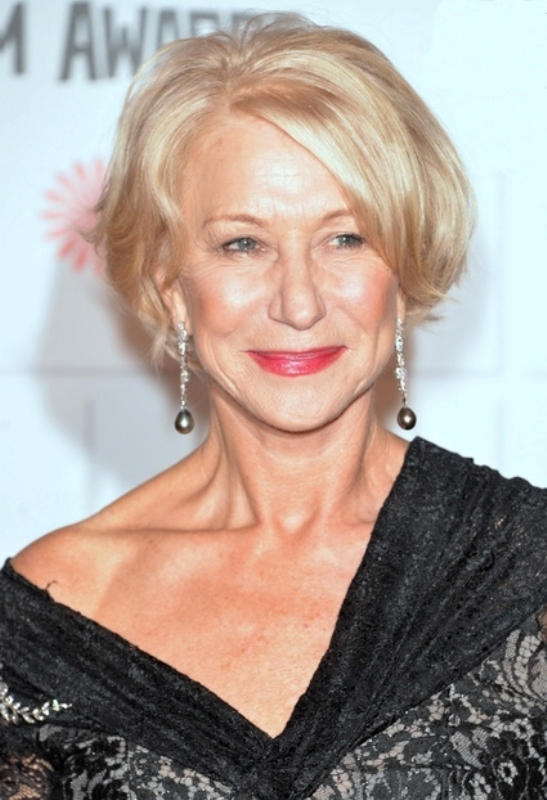
Helen Mirren, Outstanding Performance by a Female Actor in a Leading Role and Outstanding Performance by a Female Actor in a Miniseries or Television Movie winner

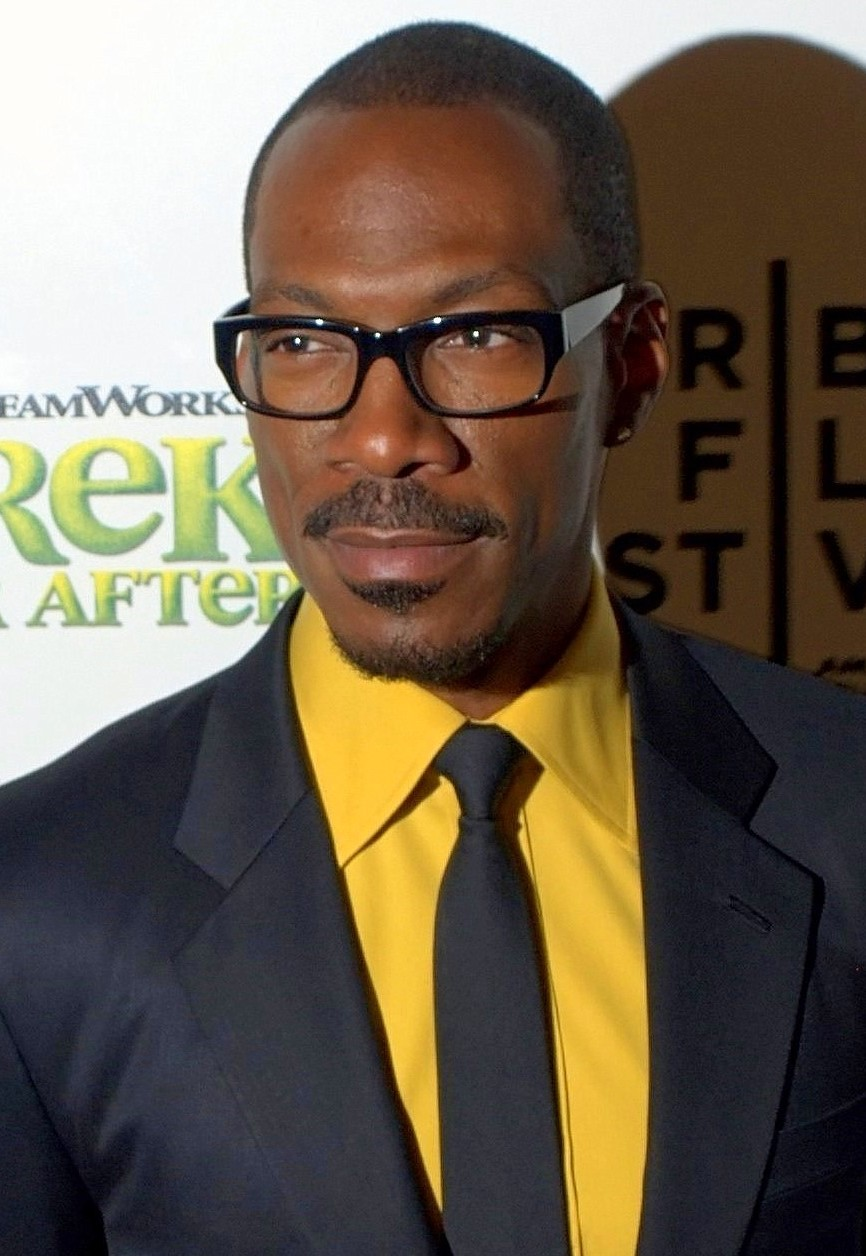
Eddie Murphy, Outstanding Performance by a Male Actor in a Supporting Role winner

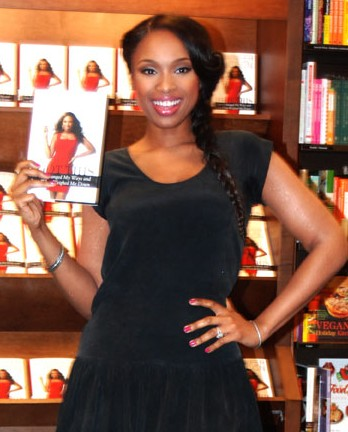
Jennifer Hudson, Outstanding Performance by a Female Actor in a Supporting Role winner

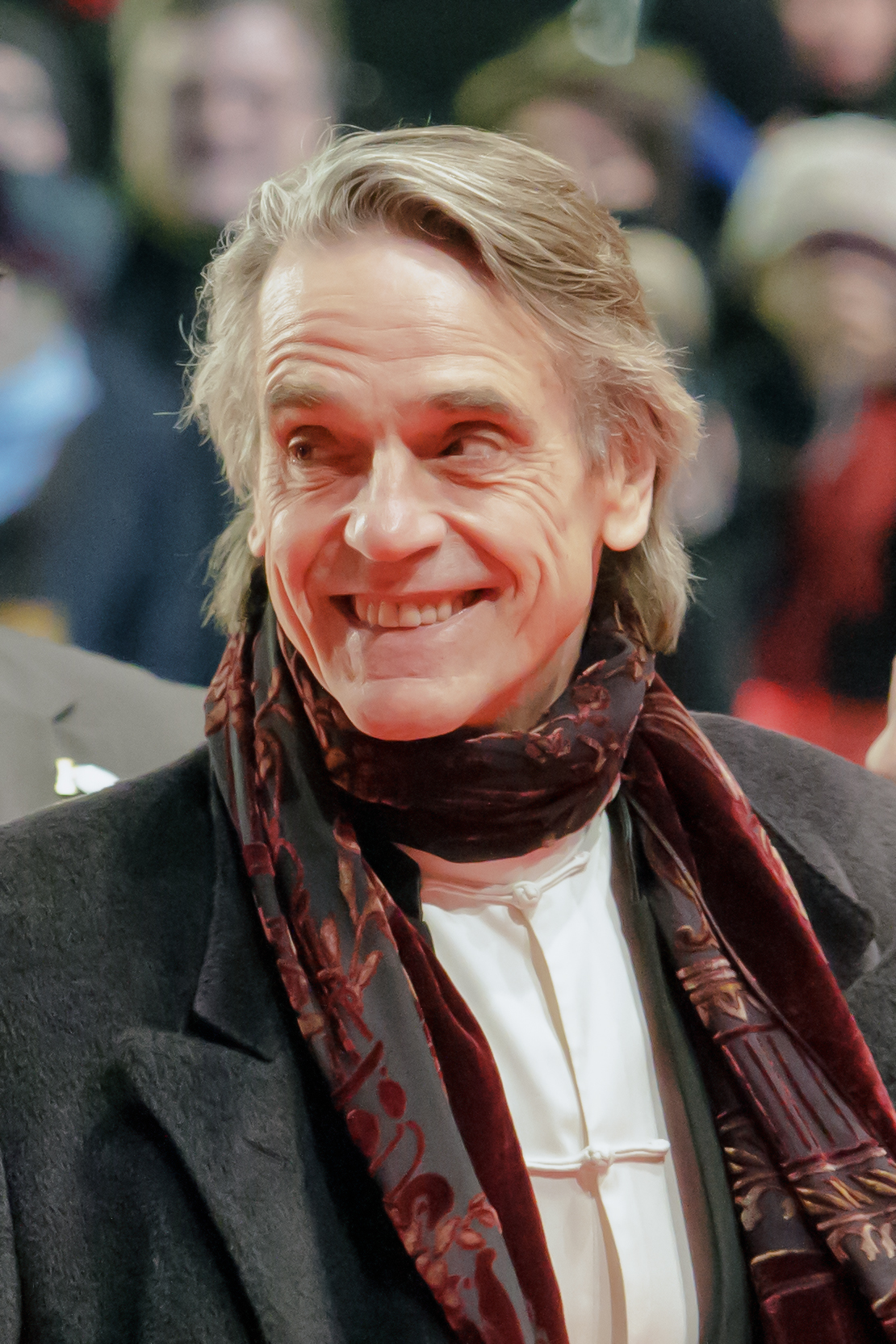
Jeremy Irons, Outstanding Performance by a Male Actor in a Miniseries or Television Movie winner

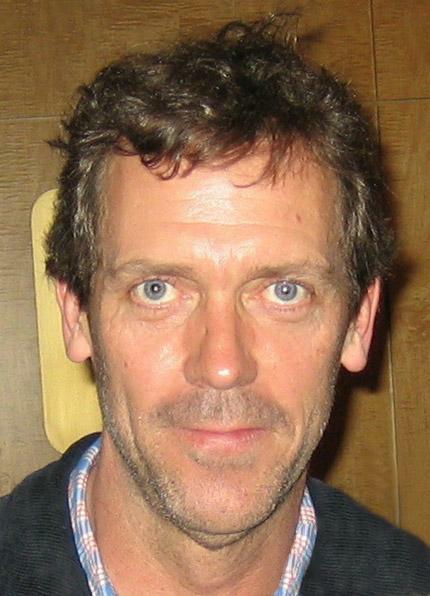
Hugh Laurie, Outstanding Performance by a Male Actor in a Drama Series winner

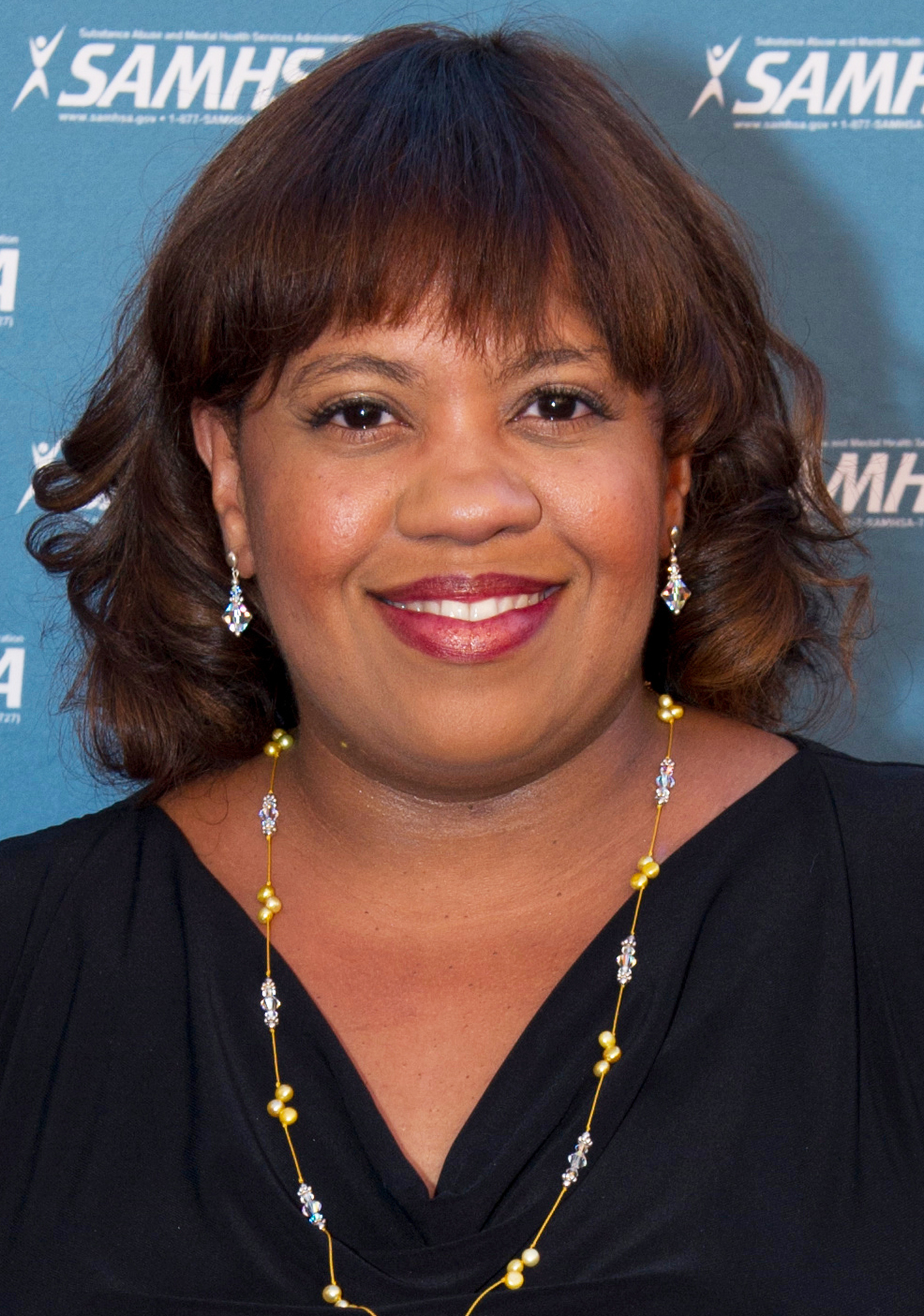
Chandra Wilson, Outstanding Performance by a Female Actor in a Drama Series winner

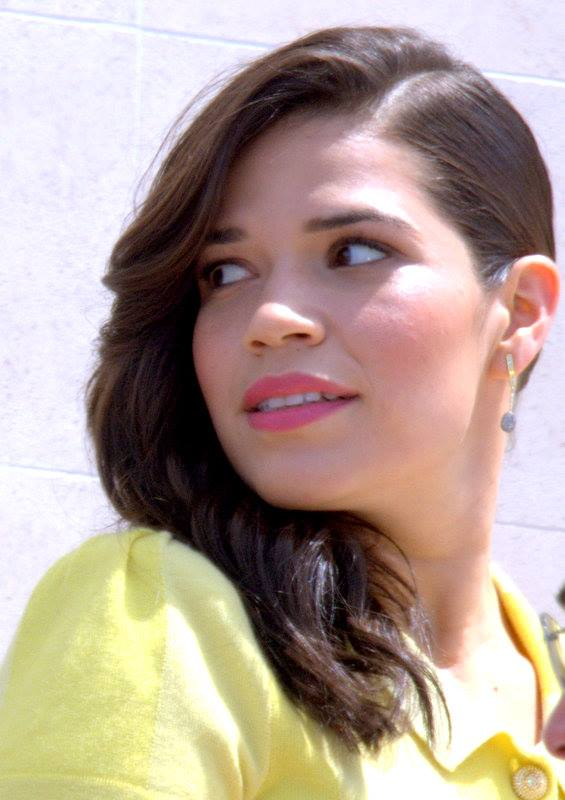
America Ferrera, Outstanding Performance by a Female Actor in a Comedy Series winner

=== Film ===
Outstanding Performance by a Male Actor in a Leading Role	Outstanding Performance by a Female Actor in a Leading Role
**Forest Whitaker – The Last King of Scotland as Idi Amin**; Leonardo DiCaprio – Blood Diamond as Danny Archer; Ryan Gosling – Half Nelson as Dan Dunne; Peter O'Toole – Venus as Maurice; Will Smith – The Pursuit of Happyness as Chris Gardner	**Helen Mirren – The Queen as Queen Elizabeth II**; Penélope Cruz – Volver as Raimunda; Judi Dench – Notes on a Scandal as Barbara Covett; Meryl Streep – The Devil Wears Prada as Miranda Priestly; Kate Winslet – Little Children as Sarah Pierce
Outstanding Performance by a Male Actor in a Supporting Role	Outstanding Performance by a Female Actor in a Supporting Role
**Eddie Murphy – Dreamgirls as James "Thunder" Early**; Alan Arkin – Little Miss Sunshine as Edwin Hoover; Leonardo DiCaprio – The Departed as Billy Costigan; Jackie Earle Haley – Little Children as Ronald "Ronnie" James McGorvey; Djimon Hounsou – Blood Diamond as Solomon Vandy	**Jennifer Hudson – Dreamgirls as Effie White**; Adriana Barraza – Babel as Amelia; Cate Blanchett – Notes on a Scandal as Sheba Hart; Abigail Breslin – Little Miss Sunshine as Olive Hoover; Rinko Kikuchi – Babel as Chieko Wataya
Outstanding Performance by a Cast in a Motion Picture
**Little Miss Sunshine – Alan Arkin, Abigail Breslin, Steve Carell, Toni Collette, Paul Dano, and Greg Kinnear**; Babel – Adriana Barraza, Cate Blanchett, Gael García Bernal, Rinko Kikuchi, Brad Pitt, and Kōji Yakusho; Bobby – Harry Belafonte, Joy Bryant, Nick Cannon, Emilio Estevez, Laurence Fishburne, Brian Geraghty, Heather Graham, Anthony Hopkins, Helen Hunt, Joshua Jackson, David Krumholtz, Ashton Kutcher, Shia LaBeouf, Lindsay Lohan, William H. Macy, Svetlana Metkina, Demi Moore, Freddy Rodriguez, Martin Sheen, Christian Slater, Sharon Stone, Jacob Vargas, Mary Elizabeth Winstead, and Elijah Wood; The Departed – Anthony Anderson, Alec Baldwin, Matt Damon, Leonardo DiCaprio, Vera Farmiga, Jack Nicholson, Martin Sheen, Mark Wahlberg, and Ray Winstone; Dreamgirls – Hinton Battle, Jamie Foxx, Danny Glover, Jennifer Hudson, Beyoncé Knowles, Sharon Leal, Eddie Murphy, Keith Robinson, and Anika Noni Rose

=== Television ===
Outstanding Performance by a Male Actor in a Miniseries or Television Movie	Outstanding Performance by a Female Actor in a Miniseries or Television Movie
**Jeremy Irons – Elizabeth I (HBO) as Earl of Leicester**; Thomas Haden Church – Broken Trail (AMC) as Tom Harte; Robert Duvall – Broken Trail (AMC) as Prentice "Print" Ritter; William H. Macy – Nightmares & Dreamscapes: From the Stories of Stephen King (TNT) as Det. Clyde Umney; Matthew Perry – The Ron Clark Story (TNT) as Ron Clark	**Helen Mirren – Elizabeth I (HBO) as Elizabeth I**; Annette Bening – Mrs. Harris (HBO) as Jean Harris; Shirley Jones – Hidden Places (Hallmark Channel) as Aunt Batty; Cloris Leachman – Mrs. Harris (HBO) as Pearl Schwartz; Greta Scacchi – Broken Trail (AMC) as Mrs. Nola Johns
Outstanding Performance by a Male Actor in a Drama Series	Outstanding Performance by a Female Actor in a Drama Series
**Hugh Laurie – House (Fox) as Dr. Gregory House**; James Gandolfini – The Sopranos (HBO) as Tony Soprano; Michael C. Hall – Dexter (Showtime) as Dexter Morgan; James Spader – Boston Legal (ABC) as Alan Shore; Kiefer Sutherland – 24 (Fox) as Jack Bauer	**Chandra Wilson – Grey's Anatomy (ABC) as Miranda Bailey**; Patricia Arquette – Medium (NBC) as Allison DuBois; Edie Falco – The Sopranos (HBO) as Carmela Soprano; Mariska Hargitay – Law & Order: Special Victims Unit (NBC) as Det. Olivia Benson; Kyra Sedgwick – The Closer (TNT) as Det. Brenda Leigh Johnson
Outstanding Performance by a Male Actor in a Comedy Series	Outstanding Performance by a Female Actor in a Comedy Series
**Alec Baldwin – 30 Rock (NBC) as Jack Donaghy**; Steve Carell – The Office (NBC) as Michael Scott; Jason Lee – My Name Is Earl (NBC) as Earl J. Hickey; Jeremy Piven – Entourage (HBO) as Ari Gold; Tony Shalhoub – Monk (USA Network) as Adrian Monk	**America Ferrera – Ugly Betty (ABC) as Betty Suarez**; Felicity Huffman – Desperate Housewives (ABC) as Lynette Scavo; Julia Louis-Dreyfus – The New Adventures of Old Christine (CBS) as Christine Campbell; Megan Mullally – Will & Grace (NBC) as Karen Walker; Mary-Louise Parker – Weeds (Showtime) as Nancy Botwin; Jaime Pressly – My Name Is Earl (NBC) as Joy Turner
Outstanding Performance by an Ensemble in a Drama Series
**Grey's Anatomy (ABC) – Justin Chambers, Eric Dane, Patrick Dempsey, Katherine Heigl, T. R. Knight, Sandra Oh, James Pickens Jr., Ellen Pompeo, Sara Ramirez, Kate Walsh, Isaiah Washington, and Chandra Wilson**; 24 (Fox) – Jayne Atkinson, Jude Ciccolella, Roger Cross, Gregory Itzin, Louis Lombardi, James Morrison, Glenn Morshower, Mary Lynn Rajskub, Kim Raver, Jean Smart, and Kiefer Sutherland; Boston Legal (ABC) – Rene Auberjonois, Candice Bergen, Craig Bierko, Julie Bowen, William Shatner, James Spader, and Mark Valley; Deadwood (HBO) – Jim Beaver, Powers Boothe, Sean Bridgers, W. Earl Brown, Dayton Callie, Brian Cox, Kim Dickens, Brad Dourif, Anna Gunn, John Hawkes, Jeffrey Jones, Paula Malcomson, Gerald McRaney, Ian McShane, Timothy Olyphant, Molly Parker, Leon Rippy, William Sanderson, Brent Sexton, Bree Seanna Wall, Robin Weigert, and Titus Welliver; The Sopranos (HBO) – Sharon Angela, Lorraine Bracco, Max Casella, Dominic Chianese, Edie Falco, James Gandolfini, Joseph R. Gannascoli, Dan Grimaldi, Robert Iler, Michael Imperioli, Steve Schirripa, Jamie-Lynn Sigler, Tony Sirico, Aida Turturro, Maureen Van Zandt, Steven Van Zandt, and Frank Vincent
Outstanding Performance by an Ensemble in a Comedy Series
**The Office (NBC) – Leslie David Baker, Brian Baumgartner, Steve Carell, David Denman, Jenna Fischer, Kate Flannery, Melora Hardin, Mindy Kaling, Angela Kinsey, John Krasinski, Paul Lieberstein, B. J. Novak, Oscar Nunez, Phyllis Smith, and Rainn Wilson**; Desperate Housewives (ABC) – Andrea Bowen, Mehcad Brooks, Richard Burgi, Ricardo Antonio Chavira, Marcia Cross, James Denton, Teri Hatcher, Josh Henderson, Zane Huett, Felicity Huffman, Kathryn Joosten, Nashawn Kearse, Brent Kinsman, Shane Kinsman, Joy Lauren, Eva Longoria, Kyle MacLachlan, Laurie Metcalf, Shawn Pyfrom, Doug Savant, Dougray Scott, Nicollette Sheridan, Brenda Strong, Kiersten Warren, and Alfre Woodard; Entourage (HBO) – Kevin Connolly, Kevin Dillon, Jerry Ferrara, Adrian Grenier, Rex Lee, Debi Mazar, Jeremy Piven, and Perrey Reeves; Ugly Betty (ABC) – Alan Dale, America Ferrera, Mark Indelicato, Ashley Jensen, Eric Mabius, Becki Newton, Ana Ortiz, Tony Plana, Stelio Savante, Kevin Sussman, Michael Urie, and Vanessa Williams; Weeds (Showtime) – Martin Donovan, Alexander Gould, Allie Grant, Indigo, Justin Kirk, Romany Malco, Andy Milder, Kevin Nealon, Maulik Pancholy, Mary-Louise Parker, Hunter Parrish, Tonye Patano, Elizabeth Perkins, and Eden Sher

=== Screen Actors Guild Life Achievement Award ===
- Julie Andrews

== Multiple nominations ==
=== Film ===
Nominations	Film
3	Babel
3	Dreamgirls
3	Little Miss Sunshine
2	Blood Diamond
2	The Departed
2	Little Children
2	Notes on a Scandal

=== Television ===
Nominations	Program
3	Broken Trail
3	The Sopranos
2	24
2	Boston Legal
2	Desperate Housewives
2	Elizabeth I
2	Entourage
2	Grey's Anatomy
2	Mrs. Harris
2	My Name Is Earl
2	The Office
2	Ugly Betty
2	Weeds

== Multiple wins ==
=== Film ===
Wins	Film
2	Dreamgirls

=== Television ===
Wins	Program
2	Elizabeth I
2	Grey's Anatomy

== In Memoriam ==
Anne Hathaway presented a filmed tribute to the actors who died in 2006:

- Dennis Weaver
- Edward Albert
- Robert Earl Jones
- Mickey Hargitay
- Phyllis Kirk
- Barnard Hughes
- Henderson Forsythe
- Peter Boyle
- Robert Cornthwaite
- Mako Iwamatsu
- Lee Zimmer
- Jane Wyatt
- Robert Sterling
- Moira Shearer
- Red Buttons
- Fayard Nicholas
- Paul Gleason
- June Allyson
- Arthur Franz
- Dana Reeve
- Bruno Kirby
- Richard Stahl
- Robert Donner
- Darren McGavin
- Maureen Stapleton
- Arthur Hill
- Chris Penn
- Frances Bergen
- Elizabeth Allen
- Al Lewis
- James Brown
- Mike Evans
- Patrick Quinn
- Pedro Gonzalez-Gonzalez
- Franklin Cover
- Yvonne De Carlo
- Don Knotts
- Jack Warden
- Glenn Ford
- Jack Palance
