= Macdonald Hall Goes Hollywood =

1991 novel by Gordon Korman

- First US edition
- Author: Gordon Korman
- Language: English
- Series: Macdonald Hall Series
- Genre: Adventure
- Publisher: Scholastic Canada Ltd.
- Publication date: 1991, 2003, 2014
- Publication place: Canada
- Media type: Print (Paperback)
- Pages: 217
- Preceded by: The Zucchini Warriors
- Followed by: Something Fishy At Macdonald Hall

Macdonald Hall Goes Hollywood is the sixth novel in Gordon Korman's Bruno and Boots series featuring the adventures of Bruno Walton and his best friend Boots O'Neal at the fictitious boarding school of Macdonald Hall, located in the fictitious town of Chutney, Ontario. The novel was originally published in 1991, though the title was changed to Lights, Camera, Disaster in 2003.

== Plot ==
A movie production project from Hollywood moves to Macdonald Hall so they can use the school as a backdrop for their movie, Academy Blues. Upon hearing that the director, Seth Dinkman, is willing to use students in crowd scenes, Bruno tries multiple times to ask the director to get into a crowd scene, but Dinkman rejects him due to Bruno's garishness. Desperate to get in the movie, Bruno tries multiple times to disguise himself so he could sneak in, but Dinkman complains to Mr. Sturgeon, who as a result, punishes Bruno by forbidding him to be involved in the movie.

Bruno begins developing contempt for the teenage star of the movie, Jordie Jones, especially because the girls at Miss Scrimmage's Finishing School go crazy about him. Angrily, he decides to play a prank on Jordie by hiding fireworks around the trailer that he sleeps in and setting them off on his birthday to scare him. Upon setting up the plan, they discover that Jordie is actually crying because he was lonely, and nobody remembered it was his birthday. Feeling sorry for him, Bruno cancels the fireworks prank and decide to throw him a birthday party the next night, while Boots sleeps in Jordie's trailer to fool security.

The next night, the girls at Miss Scrimmage's decide to capture Jordie. They enter Jordie's trailer and wrap the body inside a blanket, without knowing that it was actually Boots and not Jordie. After carrying Boots into the school, they unwrap the blanket and Boots is revealed. The girls angrily leave and Boots ends up stranded there. Miss Scrimmage catches him but thinks Boots was the one intruding and marches him back to Macdonald Hall at gunpoint. Eventually Bruno discovers Boots is in trouble, and wakes up Mr. Sturgeon, who breaks Miss Scrimmage's shotgun. Jordie gratefully goes to Mr. Sturgeon to defend them and explain to them about the party, resulting in Mr. Sturgeon changing his mind about punishing Bruno and Boots.

Jordie is grateful about the birthday party, he talks director Dinkman into giving Bruno another chance, but Bruno messes up again. Later, the team goes to practice for the final hockey game against York Academy, and upon hearing that Jordie also plays hockey, invites him to play with them. Careful not to not reveal Jordie's true identity to Coach Flynn, they get him to play goalie so he can wear a mask.

Later, the boys go to Miss Scrimmage’s school dance. Jordie is eager to go, but he is disguised as a prince from a foreign country. However, in the dance, Calvin Fihzgart's cologne causes Jordie to sneeze violently, blowing his cover. Chaos ensues when the girls desperately try to reach him while the boys desperately try to defend him, putting Jordie in danger.

Miss Scrimmage, Dinkman, and Jordie’s overprotective manager Goose Golden become very upset about the incident, so Mrs. Sturgeon decides to invite them over for dinner so they can settle their differences. Mr. Sturgeon tells Dinkman that Jordie is being overprotected, so Dinkman agrees to give Jordie the ability to socialize with the students without having to do so in secrecy. Thus, Jordie is given the ability to help the team practice for the hockey game every day after school. Meanwhile, Jordie talks Dinkman into giving Bruno a final chance to be in the movie, but Bruno messes up yet again.

Later, the team goes to play the hockey match against York Academy, with Jordie attending as a spectator. However, when goalie Pete Anderson gets knocked out, the team is in dire needed of a backup goalie. Jordie volunteers and goes into the game to play. They would end up winning, but Jordie ends up getting a black eye after his mask falls off and he gets hit by the puck.

With Jordie’s black eye, the movie production team is no longer able to continue shooting the movie, so Jordie ends up being forced to promote the movie non-stop with 24-hour interviews, and Bruno now has to go to prepare for a mandatory five-day camping trip to Algonquin Park. The day before the camping trip, Bruno makes one last attempt to sneak into the movie when he gets Boots to successfully divert the stuntman that was supposed to shoot that scene. Bruno, disguised as the stuntman, successfully performs the stunt, but he gets rejected after his wig falls off and Dinkman discovers his true identity.

Bruno and the boys go off to the camping trip, but to their surprise, Jordie sneaks along due to him feeling imprisoned by the never-ending requests to do interviews. When the teachers supervising the camp, Mr. Flynn and Mr. Fudge, discover the presence of Jordie, they try to send him back by getting Mr. Fudge to find a route back to the highway. However, Mr. Fudge ends up lost, so they try to be rescued by building an S.O.S. raft.

Meanwhile, back at Macdonald Hall, Goose Golden is the first to discover the disappearance of Jordie Jones. Despite being told by Dinkman to keep it a secret, he accidentally spills it, resulting in the school turning into a media circus as hundreds of news reporters settle at the campus, demanding answers. Mr. Sturgeon, annoyed by the circus, decides to drive to Algonquin Park himself to bring back Jordie. Meanwhile, Cathy Burton, a student at Scrimmage’s, immediately realizes that Jordie has gone on the camping trip. Miss Scrimmage is supposed to take Cathy and the members of the Baking Club to Montreal the next day, but Cathy, knowing that Miss Scrimmage prints out road directions when travelling, replaces them with the directions to Algonquin Park.

Mr. Sturgeon goes to drive to Algonquin Park the very next morning, and after desperate pleading from Goose Golden, reluctantly agrees to take Golden with him. As soon as they arrive at Algonquin Park, Golden regrets his decision immediately, having come completely unprepared. Meanwhile, Miss Scrimmage also drives the girls to Algonquin Park, thinking that she is actually driving to Montreal. Eventually Miss Scrimmage notices that something is wrong with the road, but the girls are able to successfully convince her to go on the camping trip. So they go on a hike in the forest to find Jordie. Excited about finally being able to meet Jordie, Cathy begins shrieking in excitement.

Bruno and the boys on the camping trip hear the shrieks, but Elmer Drimsdale, the school genius, insists that the shriek was the sound of a leopard. They decide to climb onto the S.O.S. raft, knowing that leopards are afraid of water. At first, Mr. Flynn was reluctant to believe Elmer, but after the shrieks increase in volume, everybody becomes convinced. Mr. Sturgeon and Goose Golden find them and also climb onto the raft. Just as the shrieks became at their loudest, everybody discovers that the shrieks actually came from Cathy. Soon after, a helicopter descends from the sky with Seth Dinkman inside, and everybody is rescued safely.

The movie crew returns to Macdonald Hall where they can shoot two more scenes: the final scene of the movie where they have to set off some explosives by pushing a plunger to blow up the model of the school building, and the bicycle stunt scene which Bruno hijacked. However, they connect the wrong wires, and end up setting off a firework that Bruno forgot to dismantle after cancelling the plan to prank Jordie earlier in the novel. The firework destroys the emergency brakes for Jordie’s trailer (with Goose Golden inside), and the trailer rolls down a hill and destroys the model. Meanwhile, the stuntman who was supposed to do the bicycle stunt ends up injuring himself trying to escape the trailer, thus resulting in Bruno achieving his dream of finally being part of the movie.

== Characters ==
=== Macdonald Hall ===
- Bruno Walton - The student who desperately tries to sneak into the movie. At first he dislikes Jordie Jones but eventually befriends him. He does a lot of mischievous activities to help Jordie blend in like a student.
- Melvin P. "Boots" O'Neal - Bruno's best friend and the captain of the hockey team. Often tries to make Bruno stay out of trouble, but Bruno usually ends up convincing him to help him in his schemes anyway.
- Mark Davies - The student making a documentary film about the production of the movie. A running gag is Mark repeatedly adding unnecessary scenes to his film and the other boys complaining about it.
- Larry Wilson - The student who is the office messenger. He often knows about things other students don't know and passes on the news.
- Wilbur Hackenschleimer - An overweight student and an amateur weightlifter who is repeatedly worried about food.
- Pete Anderson - A dim-witted but good-natured student. When Jordie Jones is disguised, he is oblivious to the fact that the disguised character was Jordie.
- Elmer Drimsdale - The smartest student in the school. He is an expert on identifying animal sounds, albeit his mistake of wrongly identifying a leopard at the end.
- Sidney Rampulsky - The school klutz who is always careless. At Jordie's birthday party he mistook fireworks for candles.
- Calvin Fihzgart - The school braggart. He claims to be skilled at camping but proves to be otherwise.
- Mr. William R. "The Fish" Sturgeon - The headmaster of Macdonald Hall who has a lot of conflict with Miss Scrimmage who repeatedly insists that his boys are harassing her girls.
- Mrs. Mildred Sturgeon - Mr. Sturgeon's wife who often thinks Mr. Sturgeon is being too strict on the boys.
- Mr. Alex Flynn - The coach for the hockey team and a supervisor for the camping trip.
- Mr. Dave Fudge - The housemaster for Dormitory 3 and a supervisor for the camping trip.

=== Scrimmage's Finishing School ===
- Miss Scrimmage - The headmistress of Miss Scrimmage's Finishing School. Often accuses Mr. Sturgeon of his students terrorizing her girls.
- Cathy Burton - A mischievous student who makes a lot of plans, such as the plan to throw Jordie a surprise party and to get Miss Scrimmage to drive them to Algonquin Park.
- Diane Grant - Cathy's best friend.
- Ruth Sidwell, Vanessa Robinson, Wilma Dorf - Girls involved with throwing the surprise birthday party, and are also members of the baking club who went to Algonquin Park to find Jordie.

=== Movie Crew ===
- Jordie Jones - The teenage star of the movie. In the beginning, he feels lonely because of the inability to socialize with the students of Macdonald Hall of around his age, but Bruno helps him make friends. Previously a child actor known for starring in a series of diaper commercials.
- Seth Dinkman - The director of the movie. He is often seen annoyed because of Bruno repeatedly sabotaging the movie and of Goose Golden's overprotection of Jordie.
- Goose Golden - Jordie's overprotective manager. He has insomnia and is suspected to have obsessive–compulsive disorder with his repeated worrying about Jordie and his over-thinking about non-existent possible problems of Jordie. It is dubious whether or not the name he's referred to is his actual name.

== Reception ==
Publishers Weekly referred to Macdonald Hall Goes Hollywood as a "rollicking tale" and highlighted "Korman's vibrant dialogue and breakneck action". However, they critiqued the novel's "superficial characters", as well as the "predictable storyline and a plot that is merely a series of isolated episodes". On behalf of the Canadian Review of Materials, Ila D. Scott similarly called the characters "only briefly sketched" but noted that they "are consistent and enjoyable".

Scott further wrote, "Korman shows his strength with this particular kind of novel in his fastmoving pace, his comic touch with dialogue, and his understanding of what makes boys this age tick".

Kirkus Reviews concluded, "The charm of Korman's latest 'Bruno & Boots' story lies in his ability to make the total chaos of slapstick comedy utterly believable."
