= Broken Trail =

2006 TV film

- Promotional poster
- Written by: Alan Geoffrion
- Directed by: Walter Hill
- Starring: Robert Duvall; Thomas Haden Church; Greta Scacchi; Gwendoline Yeo; Chris Mulkey; Rusty Schwimmer; Scott Cooper; Donald Fong; James Russo
- Theme music composer: Van Dyke Parks; David Mansfield
- Countries of origin: United States; Canada
- Original language: English

Production
- Producers: Michael Frislev; Damian Ganczewski; Alan Geoffrion; Walter Hill; Chad Oakes; Ronald Parker
- Cinematography: Lloyd Ahern
- Editors: Freeman Davies; Phil Norden
- Running time: 184 minutes
- Production companies: Butcher's Run Films; Nomadic Pictures; One Upon a Time Films; Sony Pictures Television

Original release
- Network: AMC
- Release: June 25 – June 26, 2006

Broken Trail is a 2006 Western television miniseries directed by Walter Hill and starring Robert Duvall and Thomas Haden Church. Written by Alan Geoffrion, who also wrote the novel, the story is about an aging cowboy and his nephew who transport 500 horses from Oregon to Wyoming to sell them to the British Army. Along the way, their simple horse drive is complicated when they rescue five Chinese girls from a slave trader, saving them from a life of prostitution and indentured servitude. Compelled to do the right thing, they take the girls with them as they continue their perilous trek across the frontier, followed by a vicious gang of killers sent by the whorehouse madam who originally paid for the girls.

Broken Trail weaves together two historical events: the British buying horses in the American West in the late 19th century and Chinese women being transported from the West Coast to the interior to serve as prostitutes. The movie was filmed on location in Calgary, Alberta. The miniseries originally aired on American Movie Classics as its first original film. Broken Trail received 4 Emmy Awards for Outstanding Miniseries, Outstanding Casting for a Miniseries, Movie, or a Special, Outstanding Lead Actor in a Miniseries or Movie (Robert Duvall), and Outstanding Supporting Actor in a Miniseries or a Movie (Thomas Haden Church).

== Plot ==
Part 1

In San Francisco in 1898, countless Chinese girls are sold into slavery and brought to the American West to live as prostitutes among the miners and railway workers. Capt. Billy Fender (James Russo) arrives in San Francisco and purchases five Chinese girls to be sold as prostitutes in Idaho.

In southeastern Oregon, Prentice "Prent" Ritter (Robert Duvall), an aging cowboy, arrives at the Gap Ranch to inform his cowboy nephew, Tom Harte (Thomas Haden Church), that his mother died. Estranged from her son years earlier after he left the family ranch to become a buckaroo, she left behind a brief impersonal note informing her son that she left everything in her will to her brother Prent. Uncomfortable with her unfair decision, and wanting to reconnect with his nephew, Prent tells him about his plan to transport 500 horses from Oregon to Sheridan, Wyoming, where he will sell them to the British Army. He offers Tom 25% of the profits if he joins him in the business venture.

After purchasing 500 horses from various ranches in the region, Prent and Tom head out east with the herd toward the Idaho border. Along the way, Prent sends Tom into a nearby town to purchase supplies. At the local saloon, he purchases three bottles of whiskey. When the bartender attempts to throw out an Irish fiddler named Heck Gilpin (Scott Cooper), Tom intervenes and punches out the bartender. He hires the fiddler to accompany them on their venture.

Back on the trail, they meet Capt. Billy Fender and his five Chinese girls. Fender asks if he can follow along and Prent agrees. That night, Fender offers the cowboys sex with one of the Chinese girls, but they decline. Later, Fender drugs the cowboys' whiskey, and while they sleep, he steals their money and saddled horses and escapes with one of the girls (later given the name of #4), leaving the other Chinese girls behind. The next morning, the men realize what's happened, and Tom rides off in search of Fender. He finds him in a drunken sleep after he's raped the girl. For being a horse thief and other transgressions, Tom hangs Fender from a tree and heads back to camp with the girl.

Meanwhile, Prent becomes acquainted with the Chinese girls who are taught to call him "Uncle Prent". Unable to bridge the language gap, Prent assigns numbers to the girls, naming Ghee Moon (Jadyn Wong) #1, Mai Ling (Caroline Chan) #2, Sun Fu (Gwendoline Yeo) #3, Ye Fung (Olivia Cheng) #4, and Ging Wa (Valerie Tian) #5. He first tried to name Ging Wa #4 but she protests that 4 is an unlucky number. When Tom returns with Ye Fung, she is given the unlucky name of #4.

The group then continues east across Idaho. As the oldest of the girls, #3 explains to the others that these men are good and will protect them. Along the way, Tom teaches #3 how to drive the wagon, and Prent teaches #5 how to ride a horse. One night, #2 develops a tick fever. While Tom watches over her during the night, she dies. The next morning, after they bury her, Prent speaks over the grave: "We're all travelers in this world. From the sweet grass to the packing house, from birth 'til death, we travel between the eternities."

Meanwhile, a hired killer named Ed "Big Ears" Bywaters (Chris Mulkey) rides into the town of Caribou City, Idaho where he meets up with "Big Rump" Kate Becker (Rusty Schwimmer), the woman who runs the city and its illegal activities. Fender was supposed to deliver the five Chinese girls to Kate, who provided him with the money. She offers to pay Ed to bring the girls back to her, but he is more interested in abusing one of Kate's former prostitutes, Nola Johns (Greta Scacchi).

Back on the trail, Prent and his outfit meet up with two strangers, one of whom Prent identifies as Smallpox Bob, and proceeds to gun him down. He orders Tom to kill his companion and his horse. Smallpox Bob infected thousands of Indians by selling them smallpox-infected blankets. Afterwards, they burn Bob and his companion and their horses and blankets. As the flames rise, the ghosts of their Indian victims dance over the flames. That night, #3 notices a hole torn in Tom's shirt, and she mends the shirt while he sleeps. A silent attraction has grown between the two.

The next day, Prent orders Tom and Heck to take the girls into the town of Caribou City and find someone who will take care of them. In town, after finding a room for the girls, Tom meets Lung Hay (Donald Fong) who is able to speak with the girls in their native language. Lung Hay explains to Tom that the girls do not want to leave Tom, Prent, and Heck—that they do not feel safe without them. Later at the saloon, Tom and Heck meet "Big Rump" Kate, who offers them one of her whores. After they decline, she demands that they hand over the Chinese girls whom she paid for when she hired Fender.

Back at the girls' room, three men break in and attack the Chinese girls wanting to rape them. Nola Johns hears the nearby screams and rushes in to help them, only to be hit in the face by one of the attackers. Tom and Heck rush in, throw one man out the window and beat up another. They throw the third man to the floor, and Tom shoots both of his thumbs off. Nola begs Tom to take her with them for her protection. As they all prepare to leave town, Kate and her henchmen approach, but Tom draws his weapon and guards his party as they leave. Kate vows to take revenge.

Part 2

Prent and his group recover from their ordeal, as Tom stitches the wound on Lung Hay's head, and Prent treats Nola's broken nose. They decide to spend several days resting the horses by the Snake River. Prent sees two men fly fishing and wishes he could try it someday. At night the men talk about the unfathomable mysteries of women, and they all enjoy listening to Heck's fiddle music. They begin to reveal more about themselves. Lung Hay left his wife in China many years ago to follow the promise of gold in America. Nola turned to prostitution after her husband killed himself. Heck was educated back east, but the prospect of adventure led him out west. Prent and Nola begin spending more time together, but Prent—whose memory of his dead wife and seven-year-old daughter still haunt him—is cautious about his feelings for her. Tom and #3 also spend time with each other, going for long walks together. No one notices #4, who had been raped by Fender and again during the attack at the hotel, growing more depressed and withdrawn. One afternoon on the trail, she steps in front of stampeding horses and is killed.

Prent and his outfit continue east through Wyoming, encountering a band of Crow Indians who demand payment to pass through their land. They demand two horses. Prent insists on only one, but gives the Indians a small carved horse figure he made as the second horse. Further on, Prent and Tom sense that they are being followed. That night, Prent sits alone by the fire while the others hide nearby. Ed and his gang ride into the camp. They were hired by Kate to bring back the Chinese girls and kill the rest. Pretending to be Smallpox Bob, Prent scares them away with the help of Tom and Heck providing cover.

After passing through Cody, Wyoming, Prent decides to head north through the Big Horn Mountains and over a steep pass known as the Whale's Back in order to avoid Ed and his gang. Tom wants to face the horse thieves and kill them, but Prent remains adamant. They abandon the wagon and, although the way is steep, they manage to make it over with the horses safely. Eventually, Prent leads his horses safely into Sheridan, Wyoming, where he closes out the deal with Malcolm, who purchases the horses on behalf of the British Army. Afterwards, Prent and the others relax, bathe, and enjoy a good meal at Malcolm's home. That night, Prent gives Tom his share of the profits plus a bit more so he can start a new life, squaring things between the two of them. Prent admits that he had to sell the farm to finance the horse venture but by giving Tom a generous amount, he also squares things between Tom and his late mother

The next day, after Tom rides off to gather in some strays, Ed and his gang show up in Sheridan and kill Heck. In the ensuing gun battle, Ed takes Nola, Lung Hay, and the girls hostage, forcing Prent to throw down his rifle. Just as Ed prepares to torture and kill Prent, the aging cowboy yells out an Indian cry as a warning to Tom, who has just arrived back at the ranch. Tom rushes to the scene, aims, and shoots the gang members and wounds Ed. As the burly killer takes aim at Tom, Prent takes a heavy mallet and clubs Ed to death.

Sometime later, Nola and the girls prepare to board a stagecoach to San Francisco. Tom says goodbye to #3 as a gentle snow falls over them. She hugs Tom and boards the stage, but at the last minute, overwhelmed by feelings of love for the young cowboy, steps down with her bags. As the stage pulls away, Tom sees her standing there, and he smiles.

Time passes and then, in 1912 at Siam Bend on the Snake River in Wyoming, Prent is fly fishing on his ranch when his longtime friend Lung Hay approaches with a letter from Nola, who has been corresponding with him for fourteen years. She writes that the girls are doing fine, that she is pleased with the name of the ranch (a reference to Prent's earlier statement to her that he would never be the king of Siam), and that her love for him has never wavered. An epilogue then reveals that in 1913 Heck's parents had his body disinterred and reburied in Richmond, Virginia. It is stated that Ging Wa (#5) studied medicine at Stanford University and moved to China with Ghee Moon (#1) to start a hospital but they were lost in Mao Zedong's revolution. It is also revealed that Tom Harte and Sun Fu married, and their grandchildren still ranch in Wyoming. The epilogue closes by stating that Nola Johns was buried at Siam Bend on the Snake River and that Prent rests at her side.

== Cast ==
- Robert Duvall as Prentice "Prent" Ritter
- Thomas Haden Church as Tom Harte
- Philip Granger as Chuck Hyde
- Greta Scacchi as Nola Johns
- Chris Mulkey as Ed "Big Ears" Bywaters
- Rusty Schwimmer as Kate "Big Rump Kate" Becker
- Gwendoline Yeo as Sun Fu, #3
- Scott Cooper as Henry "Heck" Gilpin
- Valerie Tian as Ging Wa, #5
- Caroline Chan as Mai Ling, #2
- Olivia Cheng as Ye Fung, #4
- Jadyn Wong as Ghee Moon, #1
- Donald Fong as Lung Hay
- Peter Skagen as The Bartender
- James Russo as Captain Billy Fender (Part 1)
- Shaun Johnston as Bob "Smallpox Bob"

== Production ==
Robert Duvall developed the project with Alan Geoffrion then took it to Walter Hill, with whom he had made Geronimo: An American Legend (1993).

It was originally meant to be a feature but then was felt it might be easier to raise funds as a TV mini series, so it was taken to AMC. The story was expanded, in particular the parts of the young Chinese girls and the villain who is stealing the horses.

It was AMC's first original movie.

Duvall says there were delays getting filming underway, mostly arising from a new rewrite of the script.

Walter Hill admitted there were "some difficult moments" arising out of changing the story from a film to a mini series.

I think the arguments came about because nobody wanted to make it something other than what it was. We all understood that if this thing was going to be any good, you needed to stick with what had made it good up to that point and try to develop that further rather than to introduce some entirely new format and style. But at the same time you are going to have to change it because if you were going to go from the 125 page script to the 160 pages or whatever I certainly felt that a few more narrative events might not be a bad idea. I thought we had plenty of sitting around the fire and talking things over.

Duvall requested that they restore some of the previous focus: "And I said, 'You'd better get it back to the way it was,' and they began to rewrite and we rewrote. We had to because it was going off in the wrong direction," said Duvall, explaining that the altered script had a new and, to him, unwarranted emphasis on "gunfights" and other "very obvious, melodramatic" plot devices. "We had to get back to the way [screenwriter Alan Geoffrion] wrote it. So when we got it back, I went to work Monday morning."

The miniseries was filmed from August 15 to October 18, 2005, in the foothills of the Canadian Rockies, about an hour's drive from Calgary, Alberta.

Walter Hill later said he was "determined to keep it a very big and open canvas".

I know there were two things that were beyond the script elements. Unless you really saw the country that they were caught up in and also felt the weight of the herd and what the herd does to decision making. The fact that these are all tiny characters caught up in a bad landscape may not sound very controversial but when you're dealing with a venue like the small screen that is contrary to what a lot of guys perceive to be good form. A lot of people say you the way to deal with it is to accommodate the reality of it and play it closer and more intimately. But I just thought you were going to lose a lot if you did that and I really did feel that you were going to know the characters so I wasn't going to cheat them but I wanted to put them in a big landscape.

One scene he is most proud of occurs when Church's character has to put one of the horses down by shooting it after it breaks a leg.

== Ratings ==
Movie Part	Date	Viewers (millions)
Part One	June 25, 2006	9.90
Part Two	June 26, 2006	9.77

== Reception ==
The miniseries received generally favorable reviews from critics. In his review in DVD Talk, Scott Weinberg called the film "a warm-hearted and gorgeous-looking piece of big-time Western-style filmmaking." Weinberg concluded:

This is one of the very best films I've seen all year. Duvall's clearly having one last hurrah on horseback, Walter Hill does some of his very best work in years, and Tom Church makes a very strong case for his place in the genre. Guy makes for a seriously solid cowboy.

In his review for NPR, David Bianculli wrote that "the series delivers great performances and rough-edged realism—you can almost smell the leather."

In her review in The New York Times, Alessandra Stanley wrote that the film "is much more in the debt of Lonesome Dove, probably a little too much, since it too cannot live up to that legendary epic." Stanley acknowledges, that the film "has a subtle charm of its own."

On Metacritic, the film has a score of 78 out of 100, based on reviews from 30 critics, indicating "Generally Favorable reviews".

Walter Hill later said "I think it came out to be a good film. I think it could stand to be 10 to 15 minutes shorter, but the idea that we got that amount of film in forty five days was pretty good. I think most of it is reasonably well told, good story, the performances are good. Whatever. Sometimes the road is windy. That's part of the deal too."

== Accolades ==
Year	Award	Category	Nominee(s)	Result	Ref.
2006	Torino Film Festival	Filmcritica Bastone Bianco Award		Won	
2007	Angel Awards	Silver Angel Award – National Television		Won	
2007	Directors Guild of America Awards	Outstanding Directorial Achievement in Movies for Television or Miniseries	Walter Hill	Won	
2007	Golden Globe Awards	Best Miniseries or Television Film		Nominated	
2007	Golden Globe Awards	Best Actor in a Miniseries or Motion Picture Made for Television	Robert Duvall	Nominated	
2007	Golden Globe Awards	Best Supporting Actor in a Series, Miniseries or Motion Picture Made for Television	Thomas Haden Church	Nominated	
2007	Golden Nymph Awards	Outstanding Actor – Mini Series	Scott Cooper	Nominated	
2007	Golden Nymph Awards	Outstanding Actor – Mini Series	Thomas Haden Church	Nominated	
2007	Golden Nymph Awards	Outstanding Actor – Mini Series	Robert Duvall	Nominated	
2007	Golden Nymph Awards	Outstanding Actor – Mini Series	Chris Mulkey	Nominated	
2007	Golden Nymph Awards	Outstanding Actress – Mini Series	Greta Scacchi	Nominated	
2007	Golden Reel Awards	Best Sound Editing in Television: Long Form – Dialogue and Automated; Dialogue Replacement	Kevin Howard, Rob Hegedus, and Richard Calistan	Nominated	
2007	NAMIC Vision Awards	Best Actress – Drama	Gwendoline Yeo	Nominated	
2007	New York International Film and TV Festival	Silver Medal for Best Mini-Series	Walter Hill, Chad Oakes, and Damian Ganczewski	Won	
2007	New York International Film and TV Festival	Gold Medal for Best Performance (TV Movie/Mini-Series)	Robert Duvall	Won	
2007	Online Film & Television Association Awards	Best Miniseries		Won	
2007	Online Film & Television Association Awards	Best Actor in a Motion Picture or Miniseries	Robert Duvall	Won	
2007	Online Film & Television Association Awards	Best Supporting Actor in a Motion Picture or Miniseries	Thomas Haden Church	Won	
2007	Online Film & Television Association Awards	Best Supporting Actress in a Motion Picture or Miniseries	Greta Scacchi	Nominated	
2007	Online Film & Television Association Awards	Best Writing of a Motion Picture or Miniseries	Alan Geoffrion	Nominated	
2007	Online Film & Television Association Awards	Best Ensemble in a Motion Picture or Miniseries		Nominated	
2007	Online Film & Television Association Awards	Best Costume Design in a Motion Picture or Miniseries		Nominated	
2007	Online Film & Television Association Awards	Best Editing in a Motion Picture or Miniseries		Nominated	
2007	Online Film & Television Association Awards	Best Lighting in a Motion Picture or Miniseries		Nominated	
2007	Online Film & Television Association Awards	Best Makeup/Hairstyling in a Motion Picture or Miniseries		Nominated	
2007	Online Film & Television Association Awards	Best Music in a Motion Picture or Miniseries		Nominated	
2007	Online Film & Television Association Awards	Best Production Design in a Motion Picture or Miniseries		Nominated	
2007	Online Film & Television Association Awards	Best Sound in a Motion Picture or Miniseries		Nominated	
2007	Primetime Emmy Awards	Outstanding Miniseries	Stanley M. Brooks, Robert Duvall, Robert Carliner, Chad Oakes, Walter Hill, and Damian Ganczewski	Won	
2007	Primetime Emmy Awards	Outstanding Lead Actor in a Miniseries or a Movie	Robert Duvall	Won	
2007	Primetime Emmy Awards	Outstanding Supporting Actor in a Miniseries or a Movie	Thomas Haden Church	Won	
2007	Primetime Emmy Awards	Outstanding Supporting Actress in a Miniseries or a Movie	Greta Scacchi	Nominated	
2007	Primetime Emmy Awards	Outstanding Directing for a Miniseries, Movie or a Dramatic Special	Walter Hill	Nominated	
2007	Primetime Emmy Awards	Outstanding Writing for a Miniseries, Movie or a Dramatic Special	Alan Geoffrion	Nominated	
2007	Primetime Creative Arts Emmy Awards	Outstanding Art Direction for a Miniseries or Movie	Ken Rempel, Bill Ives, and Paul Healy	Nominated	
2007	Primetime Creative Arts Emmy Awards	Outstanding Casting for a Miniseries, Movie or a Special	Jackie Lind, Wendy Weidman, Coreen Mayrs, Barbara Fiorentino, Rebecca Mangieri, and Heike Brandstatter	Won	
2007	Primetime Creative Arts Emmy Awards	Outstanding Cinematography for a Miniseries, Movie or a Special	Lloyd Ahern (for "Part 1")	Nominated	
2007	Primetime Creative Arts Emmy Awards	Outstanding Costumes for a Miniseries, Movie or a Special	Wendy Partridge and Kathleen Morley	Nominated	
2007	Primetime Creative Arts Emmy Awards	Outstanding Hairstyling for a Miniseries, Movie or a Special	Penny Thompson	Nominated	
2007	Primetime Creative Arts Emmy Awards	Outstanding Makeup for a Miniseries, Movie or a Special (Non-Prosthetic)	Debbie Vandelaar and Tania El Zahr	Nominated	
2007	Primetime Creative Arts Emmy Awards	Outstanding Music Composition for a Miniseries, Movie or a Special (Original Dramatic Score)	David Mansfield and Van Dyke Parks	Nominated	
2007	Primetime Creative Arts Emmy Awards	Outstanding Single-Camera Picture Editing for a Miniseries or a Movie	Freeman Davies and Philip Norden (for "Part 2")	Nominated	
2007	Primetime Creative Arts Emmy Awards	Outstanding Sound Editing for a Miniseries, Movie or a Special	Kevin Howard, Robert Hegedus, Richard Calistan, Clive Turner, P. Jason MacNeill, Steve Copley, Carl Sealove, John Sievert, and Virginia Storey (for "Part 2")	Nominated	
2007	Primetime Creative Arts Emmy Awards	Outstanding Sound Mixing for a Miniseries or a Movie	Michael Playfair, Cory Mandel, and James Porteous (for "Part 2")	Nominated	
2007	Rosie Awards	Best Production Designer	Ken Rempel	Won	
2007	Screen Actors Guild Awards	Outstanding Performance by a Male Actor in a Miniseries or Television Movie	Thomas Haden Church	Nominated	
2007	Screen Actors Guild Awards	Outstanding Performance by a Male Actor in a Miniseries or Television Movie	Robert Duvall	Nominated	
2007	Screen Actors Guild Awards	Outstanding Performance by a Female Actor in a Miniseries or Television Movie	Greta Scacchi	Nominated	
2007	Television Critics Association Awards	Outstanding Achievement in Movies, Miniseries and Specials		Nominated	
2007	Western Heritage Awards	Television Feature Film		Won	
2007	Western Writers of America Awards	Best Western Drama Script (Fiction)	Alan Geoffrion	Won	
2007	Writers Guild of America Awards	Long Form – Original	Alan Geoffrion	Nominated	
2008	Directors Guild of Canada Awards	Best Sound Editing – Television Movie/Mini-Series	Kevin Howard, Clive Turner, Rob Hegedus, Richard Calistan, and Jason MacNeill	Won	
