= Ron Clark Academy =

Non-profit middle school in Atlanta, Georgia, U.S.

Coordinates: 33.71223°N 84.38108°W

The Ron Clark Academy is a non-profit middle school, housed in a renovated red brick warehouse located in southeast Atlanta, Georgia, United States. Founded by its namesake, Ron Clark, and co-founder Kim Bearden, the school has students in fourth through eighth grades, from a wide range of economic backgrounds. Classes began on September 4, 2007.

== Pedagogy ==
The Ron Clark Academy uses a student-centered approach that combines rigorous academics with strong relationships and real-world connections. Teachers use movement, music, and simulations to engage students and reinforce learning. The school also emphasizes leadership and character development as part of its core curriculum. A key element of its culture is the House System, where students earn points for positive behavior, teamwork, and academic effort.

== Media attention ==
Students in debate class at Ron Clark Academy created a song about the 2008 U.S. presidential election, "Vote However You Like", to the same beat and melody of "Whatever You Like" by T.I. A performance of the song by 6th and 7th graders was posted on the internet and drew a wide viewership. T.I. paid a surprise visit to the Academy after learning of their remake of his song. On October 31, 2008, the "Students of Ron Clark Academy" were named the ABC Person of the Week by ABC World News Tonight. They were also invited to perform at the 2009 inauguration of Barack Obama.

A video of the students of Ron Clark Academy being told they were seeing the Marvel film Black Panther went viral and was covered by many major news outlets. This video inspired a sequence in the episode "Three Slaps" of the television series Atlanta.
