= The Ron Clark Story =

2006 television film

- DVD cover
- Written by: Annie deYoung; Max Enscoe
- Directed by: Randa Haines
- Starring: Matthew Perry; Ernie Hudson; Vashon Baker
- Theme music composer: Mark Adler
- Country of origin: United States
- Original language: English

Production
- Producers: Jody Brockway; Howard Burkons; Tom Cox; Brenda Friend; Adam Gilad; Paul Jackson; Craig McNeil; Murray Ord; Jordy Randall
- Cinematography: Derick Underschultz
- Editor: Heather Persons
- Running time: 96 minutes
- Production companies: Old Beantown Films; Granada America; MAGNA Global Entertainment; TNT Original Production

Original release
- Network: TNT
- Release: August 13, 2006

The Ron Clark Story (also known as The Triumph) is a 2006 American television film starring Matthew Perry. The film is based on the educator Ron Clark. It follows the tale of an idealistic teacher who leaves his small hometown to teach in a New York City public school, where he faces trouble with the students.

The film was directed by Randa Haines, and was released directly on television, premiering on TNT on August 13, 2006 and was later released on DVD in the 10 Movie Kid's Pack Volume 3 by Echo Bridge Home Entertainment in 2011.

== Plot ==
In 1998, Ron Clark – known for his innovative teaching methods that leads his students in raising test scores – leaves North Carolina to look for a new job in New York City. After some time working as a restaurant waiter, he eventually settles on an elementary school in inner Harlem – where students are sorted according to their potential. His first days as a sixth-grade teacher are stressful, as he faces resistance from some of the disruptive students of the sixth grade – listed with the lowest of their scores – who disregard or outright ignore Clark. At one point, he violently slams down the table of 12-year-old Shameika Wallace in frustration when she and many other students continually disrespect him.

Distraught at his actions, Clark initially considers resigning but eventually returns to teaching after Marissa Vega, one of his colleagues from his restaurant job, convinces him to stay. He spends several months teaching basic curriculum all while improving his relationship with his students by making deals and engaging in their hobbies. This frustrates Principal Turner, who relies on the class gaining scores for the local government to maintain his job.

Clark discusses the Revolutionary War in his creative style of rapping, enticing his students to join along. He offers student Tayshawn Mitchell to meet up at a coffee shop at noon but walks away when another student, Julio Vasquez, also arrives at the coffee shop, leading to an altercation against Julio for perceived favoritism. Mitchell's foster parents subsequently demand Tayshawn be sent to juvenile detention. At Shameika's apartment, he helps her cook dinner for her and her siblings while she is completing her homework. After Shameika's mother arrives home to this, however, she later demands that Turner should fire Clark, claiming Shameika doesn't need schooling, but Clark convinces her mother to give Shameika a chance.

During a science lesson, Clark falls ill from pneumonia and is hospitalized. While at Marissa's house to rest himself, he and Marissa record themselves video lessons for the students to learn while being observed by Turner. Returning to school, he discovers that while some of their test scores have improved, other papers received lower grades, severely lowering their chances to pass the state exams that are set to happen in a week. After leading his students to participate in the next state exam, Marissa tells Clark that her colleague Jason has a job audition in Los Angeles and asks him for advice. Clark buys the students tickets for The Phantom of the Opera in Broadway, but Tayshawn doesn't show up. Clark finds him badly beaten up by his drunken foster father in a nearby alley for painting the Phantom of the Opera on the wall of their foster home and has him sent to Turner's house to be looked after.

Near the end of the school year, as Clark presents his students awards, Turner reveals to Clark and his students and their parents that the sixth grade has passed the state exam, scoring the highest awards than any other class in Harlem. The invigorated and ecstatic students thank Clark for his selfless determination, and they start rapping about the Revolutionary War in celebration with Clark, Marissa and several other parents.

The film's postscript states that his students went on to attend the most prestigious schools across the country. Ron Clark's own teaching school – the Ron Clark Academy – opened in Atlanta in 2007. He remains close with his former students and their families.

== Cast ==
- Matthew Perry as Ron Clark
- Melissa De Sousa as Marissa Vega
- Hannah Hodson as Shameika Wallace
- Brandon Mychal Smith as Tayshawn Mitchell
- Micah Williams as Julio Vasquez
- Bren Eastcott as Badriyah
- Isabella Deluce as Alita
- Lashonda Mitchell as Raquel
- Candice Churchill as Dorthea Wallace
- Patricia Idlette as Devina
- Marty Antonini as Howard
- Aaron Grain as Jason
- Ernie Hudson as Principal Turner
- Jerry Callaghan as Ron Clark, Sr.
- Patricia Benedict as Jean Clark
- Vashon Baker as Student/Valedictorian

== Reception ==
=== Accolades ===
Association	Category	Recipient	Result	Ref
AMPIA Awards	Best Costume Designer	Christine Thomson	Won	
American Cinema Editors	Best Edited Miniseries or Motion Picture for Commercial Television	Heather Persons	Nominated	
Casting Society of America	Best Movie of the Week Casting	Gary M. Zuckerbrod; Bonnie Finnegan	Nominated	
Christopher Awards	Television	Howard Burkons; Brenda Friend; Randa Haines; Max Enscoe; Annie DeYoung	Won	
Critics' Choice Television Awards	Best Picture Made for Television	The Ron Clark Story	Nominated	
Directors Guild of America	Outstanding Directorial Achievement in Movies for Television	Randa Haines	Nominated	
Family Film Awards	Best TV Movie/Drama	Howard Burkons; Brenda Friend	Won	
Gold Derby Awards	TV movie/Mini Lead Actor	Matthew Perry	Won	
Gold Derby Awards	TV movie/Mini Lead Actor of the Decade	Matthew Perry	Nominated	
Golden Globe Awards	Best Actor in a Miniseries or Motion Picture Made for Television	Matthew Perry	Nominated	
Motion Picture Sound Editors	Best Sound Editing in Music for Television – Long Form	Joanie Diener	Nominated	
NAMIC Vision Awards	Best Actor – Drama	Ernie Hudson	Nominated	
OFTA Television Awards	Best Motion Picture	The Ron Clark Story	Nominated	
OFTA Television Awards	Best Actor in a Motion Picture or Miniseries	Matthew Perry	Nominated	
Primetime Emmy Awards	Outstanding Made for Television Movie	The Ron Clark Story	Nominated	
Primetime Emmy Awards	Outstanding Lead Actor in a Miniseries or Movie	Matthew Perry	Nominated	
Primetime Emmy Awards	Outstanding Casting for a Miniseries, Movie or a Special	Gary M. Zuckerbrod; Lonnie Maherman; Bonnie Finnegan; Rhonda Fisekci; Candice Elzinga	Nominated	
Screen Actors Guild Awards	Outstanding Performance by a Male Actor in a Television Movie or Miniseries	Matthew Perry	Nominated	
Writers Guild of America	Long Form — Original	Max Enscoe; Annie DeYoung	Nominated	
Young Artist Awards	Best Family Television Movie or Special	The Ron Clark Story	Won	
Young Artist Awards	Best Performance in a TV Movie, Miniseries or Special (Comedy or Drama) – Leading Young Actress	Hannah Hodson	Won	
Young Artist Awards	Best Performance in a TV Movie, Miniseries or Special (Comedy or Drama) – Leading Young Actor	Brandon Mychal Smith	Nominated	
Young Artist Awards	Best Performance in a TV Movie, Miniseries or Special (Comedy or Drama) – Leading Young Actor	Micah Williams	Nominated	
