= Housemaster =

Director of a dormitory, student hall or boarding house

In education, a housemaster is a schoolmaster in charge of a boarding house, normally at a boarding school and especially at a British public school. The housemaster is responsible for the supervision and care of boarders living in the house and typically lives on the premises. However, houses also exist in non-boarding schools, in which case the housemaster simply heads a house.

The term housemistress is also used, for a female member of staff in charge of a house, and houseparent is used less often, usually when a married couple shares the role. In addition, there is often an assistant housemaster or assistant housemistress acting as a deputy.

== Duties ==
The Housemaster's primary role is leading and running their boarding house, along with (if any) an assistant housemaster/mistress, resident tutors, senior prefects or a pupil 'head-of-house'. The Housemaster has a vast range of duties and responsibilities, ranging from the pastoral care of their boarders to everyday basic maintenance, laundry and organisational tasks.

Their primary duty is to care for the boarders' physical and mental well-being by providing advice, support, and information about various charges on a daily basis.

The Housemaster acts as the parent or leader of the house and deals with any problem the boarder may have.

Depending on the size of the house they may or may not have a team of staff working with them, such as other pastoral staff, housekeeping/cleaning staff and medical.

The Housemaster additionally may be a teacher, sports coach, cadet forces instructor, or, in religious schools, a member of the clergy.

== Working lifestyle ==
The post is almost always residential. The Housemaster has the pastoral care of their boarders as their primary role. A community spirit fosters between the boarders themselves and the Housemaster leading them. Many boarding houses have names, sometimes of a famous person, or a person with a strong connection and important history within the school, or they may be more functional names. Many schools, like Shrewsbury, will have houses named after former students or important figures of the school, whilst others, like Eton, will refer to houses mostly by the initials of the housemaster.

The Housemaster is the master of discipline as well as support, for the boarders. They maintain authority in their own manner within their house (and across the school). It is a semi-autonomous position and the Housemaster may have a wide range of ways in dealing with unruly or unwanted behaviour, such as official sanctions. The Housemaster will frequently be the first port-of-call for other members of staff, including teachers and other boarding staff.

== See also ==
- Head teacher
- Schoolmaster
