= Ron Clark (teacher) =

American educator, author, and motivational speaker

- Born: October 24, 1972 (age 53); Chocowinity, North Carolina, United States
- Education: East Carolina University (BA)
- Occupations: Educator, motivational speaker, author
- Television: Survivor: Edge of Extinction

Ronald L. Clark, Jr. (born October 24, 1972) is an American educator, author, and motivational speaker. He has taught in North Carolina and New York City, and later founded the Ron Clark Academy in Atlanta, Georgia. Clark has written books on education and teacher training.

== Background ==
Clark attended school in his earlier years within the Beaufort County school systems in the town of Chocowinity, North Carolina. Clark was an outgoing student who later graduated from Chocowinity High School with the Class of 1990. After graduation, Clark's goals were to become an educator at East Carolina University through the North Carolina Teaching Fellows program. Following his graduation, he traveled for a time and then began working in Aurora, North Carolina. Four years later he began teaching elementary school in Harlem, New York. In the fall of 2007 Clark and co-founder Kim Bearden founded the Ron Clark Academy, a private non-profit school in Atlanta, Georgia, which follows a unique curriculum.

== Bibliography ==
Clark has written four books on education:

1. The Essential 55: An Award-Winning Educator's Rules for Discovering the Successful Student in Every Child (2003)
2. The Excellent 11: Qualities Teachers and Parents Use to Motivate, Inspire, and Educate Children (2005)
3. The End of Molasses Classes: Getting Our Kids Unstuck: 101 Extraordinary Solutions for Parents and Teachers (2011)
4. Move Your Bus: An Extraordinary New Approach to Accelerating Success in Work and Life (2015)

== Accolades ==
Clark has appeared on national TV shows, including two appearances on The Oprah Winfrey Show, where Winfrey named him as her first "Phenomenal Man." In 2000, Clark received the Disney Teacher of the Year award. Clark's first year in Harlem was the focus of a 2006 made-for-TV movie, The Ron Clark Story, starring Matthew Perry as Clark.

== Survivor ==
In 2019, Clark competed in Survivor: Edge of Extinction and became the thirteenth person voted out of the game. He made the jury and voted for Chris Underwood to win the game.

== Personal life ==
Clark is married to his husband Lloyd Sage, who appeared in the Loved Ones Visit segment of Survivor: Edge of Extinction.
