= Albert Kresch =

American artist (1922–2022)

Albert Kresch (July 4, 1922 – March 13, 2022) was a New York School painter who lived and worked in Brooklyn, New York. One of the original members of the Jane Street Gallery in the 1940s, he exhibited in later years at Tibor de Nagy Gallery and Salander-O’Reilly Gallery. He is best known for landscape and still life compositions painted with evocatively rhythmic forms and vibrant colors.

== Biography ==
Born in Scranton, Pennsylvania on July 4, 1922, Kresch moved with his family to New York City in the 1930s. He began studying figure drawing at the Brooklyn Museum, but soon enrolled in the Hans Hofmann School. There he met Leland Bell, Louisa Matthíasdóttir, Nell Blaine, Judith Rothschild, Robert De Niro Sr., and Virginia Admiral among other artists of note. These friendships proved a source of inspiration throughout much of his life.
In the 1940s, he exhibited abstract work in his first two shows at the Jane Street Gallery, at a time when Abstract Expressionism was gathering steam. He soon embarked, however, on an independent path, inspired by his friend Jean Hélion to return to representational painting. Friendships with poets Denise Levertov, and Frank O’Hara reflect the breadth of his interests. His painting philosophy was a subject of Levertov's poems "The Dog of Art" and "Kresch's Studio."
Kresch won a Fulbright scholarship in 1953, aided in part by a letter of recommendation from his friend Willem de Kooning. Later exhibitions of his work at Salander-O’Reilly Galleries won favorable reviews, and he was elected member of the National Academy in 2005. Kresch was an art teacher during the 1950s at the historically Black Hampton Institute, where he taught student Benjamin Leroy Wigfall, whose painting "Chimneys" was among the first works by an African American that was purchased by the Virginia Museum of Fine Arts.

Kresch died on March 13, 2022, at the age of 99.

== Public Collections ==
Everhart Museum, Scranton, Pennsylvania
National Academy of Design, New York
Wright State University Galleries, Dayton, Ohio

== Bibliography ==
Artists' Theatre: Four Plays by Artists' Theatre (1960) p. 81
The Poet's Work: 29 Poets on the Origins and Practice of Their Art by Reginald Gibbons (1989) p. 258
Lush Life: The Biography of Billy Strayhorn by David Hajdu (1996) p. 126
The New York Times "Art in Review: Albert Kresch" by David Kimmelman (30 April 2002)
New and Selected Essays by Denise Levertov (1992) p. 72
New Directions 20 by James Laughlin, Peter Glassgold, Fredrick R. Martin p. 127
The Letters of Denise Levertov and William Carlos Williams by Denise Levertov and William Carlos Williams (1998) p. 49
Turning the Feather Around by George Morrison and Margot Galt (1998) p. 74
The New York Sun "Seeing the Forest and the Trees" by Maureen Mullarkey (27 July 2006)
Originals: American Women Artists by Eleanor C. Munro (2000) p. 265
Tracking the Marvelous: A Life in the New York Art World by John Bernard Myers (1984) p 166 & 174
Storefront: A Community on 129th Street and Madison Avenue by Ned O'Gorman (1970)
Antiques and the Arts Weekly "Paintings by Albert Kresch at the Salander O'Reilly Galleries" (5 April 2002)
Louisa Matthiasdottir by Jed Perl (1999) p. 56, 60, 75 and others.
What Did I Do?: The Unauthorized Autobiography of Larry Rivers by Larry Rivers and Arnold Weinstein (1993) p166, 169-71, 175, 176
Nell Blaine: Her Life and Art by Martica Sawin and Nell Blaine (1998) p 19,20,29,33,138
Selected Art Writings by James Schuyler (1998) p. 161
Just the Thing: Selected Letters of James Schuyler, 1951-1991 by James Schuyler (2004) p. 50
The Washington Post "In Jane Freilicher's Landscapes and Kate McGarry's Jazz Improvisations, There's Room to Roam" by Terry Teachout (May 5, 2002)
Leland Bell by Fox Weber (1986) p. 53, 56
