= Myrer =

Myrer is a surname. Notable people with the surname include:

- Anton Myrer (1922–1996), United States Marine Corps veteran and novelist
- Patricia Schartle Myrer (1923–2010), American editor, literary agent, and publishing executive, wife of Anton

== See also ==
- Myer (name)
