= Eric Brown (painter) =

American painter

Eric Brown (born 1967, New York City) is a painter, art advisor, and editor. He began his career at Tibor de Nagy Gallery in New York, New York, where he became co-owner and director. In 2017, Brown left his position at Tibor de Nagy Gallery to work independently as an art advisor and painter, and to pursue a degree in divinity.

== Art ==
As a painter, Brown has been featured in numerous solo and group exhibitions. Brown’s first solo exhibition Monday Paintings (2013) opened at ILLE Arts, Ammagansett, New York. His second solo show at ILLE Arts, featured mixed media and oil paintings. American Poet John Ashbery commented, “Eric Brown is one of the practitioners of this new way of exploring what critic Raphael Rubinstein calls ‘a sensual conundrum of figure/ground confusion.’ Brown’s lavishly orchestrated but single-mindedly analytical paintings offer the latest, most efficient way of ‘having it all.’” Suchness (2016), was Brown’s solo exhibition at Crush Curatorial in New York.

Brown’s most recent solo exhibition, Already and Not Yet (2022) was at Jennifer Baahng Gallery on Madison Avenue in New York City. The show comprised several works on paper and small-scale abstractions on canvas. In 2019, his exhibition Longhand at Theodore:Art in Brooklyn, New York, was reviewed by New York Times Art Critic Martha Schwendener who wrote that Brown’s paintings offer, “… a meticulous approach to painting that might be compared, as the title suggests, to slow, personal methods of writing by hand, as opposed to banging away on a computer…. the spiritual in art might happen at small scale, rather than in grand, orchestral gestures.”

Other venues that have hosted Brown’s works include McKenzie Fine Art Inc., Lennon Weinberg Gallery, Andrew Edlin Gallery, Galerie Jean Fournier Paris, James W. Palmer III Gallery at Vassar College, and Washburn Gallery. His artwork has been highlighted in publications such as artcritical, ARTnews, The New York Observer, and The New York Times. Brown’s honors include Visiting Artist and Scholar from the American Academy in Rome (2015), and MacDowell Colony Fellow (2016).

== Gallery and curatorial work ==
After the death of Tibor de Nagy in 1993, the ownership of Tibor de Nagy Gallery was passed onto Eric Brown and Andrew Arnot. As co-owner of the gallery, Brown assembled Painters and Poets: Tibor de Nagy Gallery (2011) commemorating the 60th anniversary of the gallery’s opening. The exhibition explored and brought to wider public attention a group of celebrated painters and poets in New York, often referred to as the New York Painters and Poets. Brown was the editor of Painters and Poets: Tibor de Nagy Gallery, the catalogue that accompanied the show. Brown was also the series editor of Tibor de Nagy Editions, where he published volumes of poetry.

During his time at Tibor de Nagy Gallery, Brown curated shows for notable artists including Elizabeth Bishop, Nell Blaine, Kathy Butterly, Jane Freilicher, and Larry Rivers. After leaving Tibor de Nagy, Brown began working as an art advisor through Eric Brown Art Group LLC.

He continues to advise artists’ estates, collectors, and organize exhibitions.

== Education ==
Eric Brown holds a Bachelors of Art from Vassar College (1990). During and after college, he worked as the assistant to Nell Blaine, thus forming connections to Tibor de Nagy, John Ashbery, and Jane Freilicher. Eric Brown also received a Master of Divinity from Union Theological Seminary (2020).
