= The Big War =

1957 novel by Anton Myrer

First US edition

The Big War is the second novel by American writer Anton Myrer, published by Appleton-Century-Crofts in 1957. While Myrer is best known for his 1968 novel Once an Eagle, this was his first commercial and critical success.

The novel is based on Myrer's experience serving in the South Pacific during World War II. The ordinary Marine's perception of battle is described in this book in a manner much like Saving Private Ryan or Band of Brothers, although in this work Myrer also gives a detailed description of life on "the home front" for both Marines (during leave) and their families.

== Critical reviews ==
Clifton Fadiman compared The Big War to The Naked and the Dead. Commonweal compared it to War and Peace and The Red Badge of Courage. The Boston Herald described it as a modern Iliad.

The New York Times called it "almost never exciting".

== Adaptations ==
This novel became the basis for the 1958 movie In Love and War, starring Robert Wagner, Jeffrey Hunter, Bradford Dillman and Hope Lange.
