= Anton Myrer =

American novelist (1922–1996)

- Anton Myrer
- Born: November 3, 1922; Worcester, Massachusetts, United States
- Died: January 19, 1996 (aged 73); Saugerties, New York, United States
- Education: Boston Latin High School; Phillips Exeter Academy; Harvard College
- Occupation: Novelist
- Spouse: Patricia Schartle Myrer (1923–2010)
- Writing career
- Period: 1951–1981
- Genre: Military Fiction

Anton Olmstead Myrer (November 3, 1922 – January 19, 1996) was a United States Marine Corps veteran and a best-selling author of American war novels that accurately and sensitively depict the lives of United States military personnel while in combat and in peace time. His 1968 novel, Once An Eagle, written at the peak of the Vietnam War, is required reading for all Marines and is frequently used in leadership training at West Point. The novel, considered a classic of military literature and a guide to honorable conduct in the profession of arms, has been compared favorably to Leo Tolstoy's magnum opus War and Peace. Eight years after publication, Once an Eagle was made into a television mini-series starring Sam Elliott. Glenn Ford played a supporting character.

Myrer wrote eight other novels, of which The Big War (1957) was adapted for a movie in 1958 and The Last Convertible (1978) was made into a television mini-series in 1979. Once An Eagle (1968) and The Last Convertible (1978) became international best-sellers and were translated in 19 languages.

The United States Army War College Foundation celebrates October 14 every year as Anton Myrer Army Leader Day to discuss leadership issues at the strategic level. This day serves as the capstone event for the U.S. Army War College's strategic leadership course. The United States Army War College also presents an award called the Anton Myrer Strategic leadership Writing Award annually on graduation day.

== Early years and military service ==
World War II was the one event which had the greatest impact on my life. I enlisted imbued with a rather flamboyant concept of this country's destiny as the leader of a free world and the necessity of the use of armed force. I emerged a corporal three years later in a state of great turmoil, at the core of which was an angry awareness of war as the most vicious and fraudulent self-deception man had ever devised.

— Anton Myrer

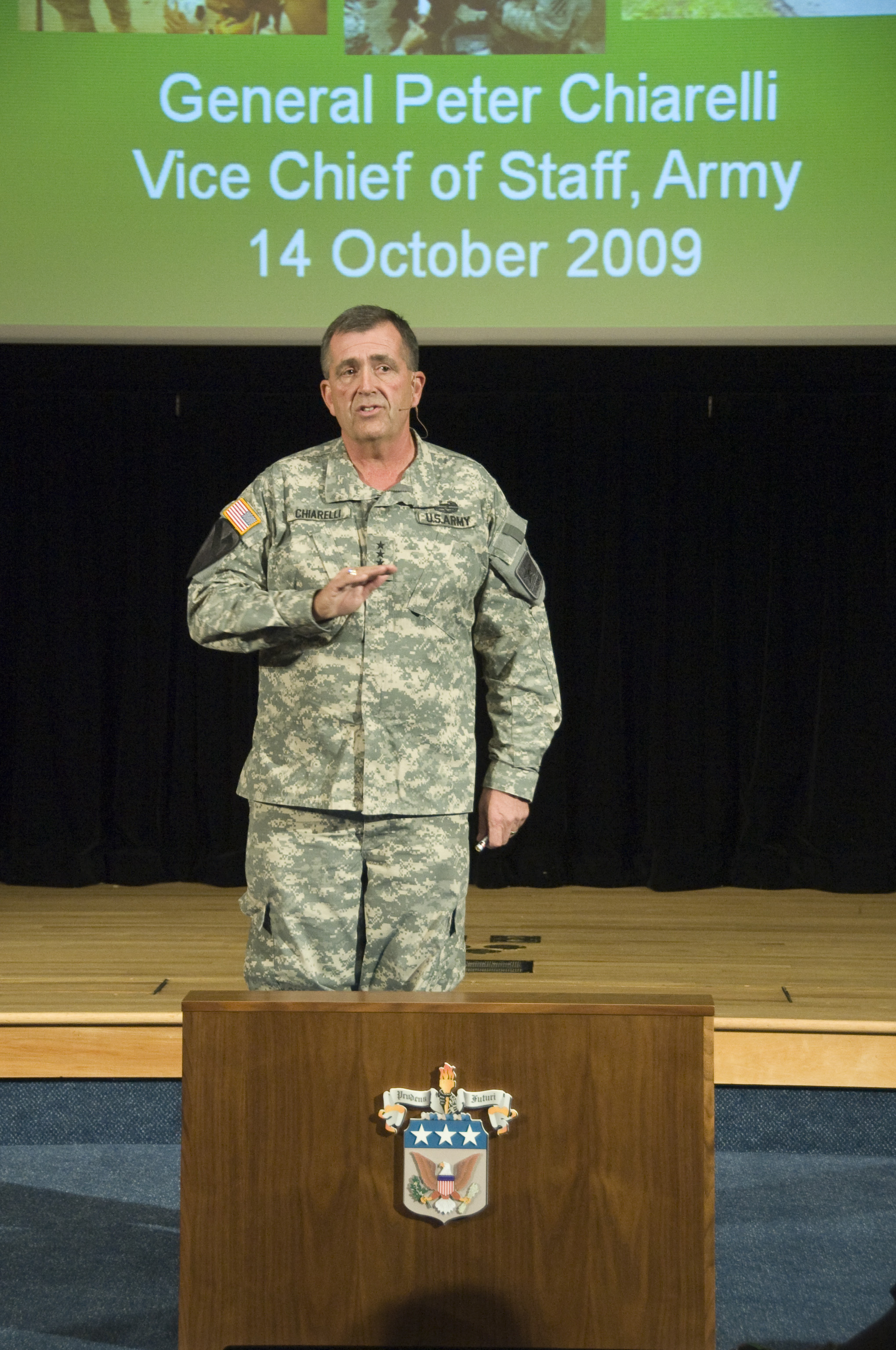
Gen. Peter Chiarelli speaking with Army War College students on the 2009 Anton Myrer Army Leader Day.

Born in Worcester, Massachusetts, on November 3, 1922, to Raymond Lewis and Angele E. Myrer, Myrer grew up in Boston, graduating from Boston Latin High School in 1940. He prepared at Phillips Exeter Academy in New Hampshire before entering Harvard College in September 1941 with the Class of 1945. Myrer's studies were interrupted, however, after the December 7, 1941 attack on Pearl Harbor. Soon after the attack, he, like many of his college peers, sought to enroll in the Army Reserve but was rejected. In 1942, he enlisted and was accepted by the United States Marine Corps. Myrer participated in the Battle of Guam and the occupation of the remaining Mariana Islands afterwards. He was wounded in Guam and was promoted to the rank of corporal before being discharged in 1946.

== Education, marriage, and writing ==
Myrer returned to Harvard and graduated magna cum laude with an A.B. in May 1947, two years after his original classmates.

In August 1947, he married artist Judith Rothschild and relocated to Rosemead, California. Random House published his first novel, Evil Under the Sun in 1951. To support his family, Myrer continued to work a number of low-paying, unskilled jobs. In 1957, his novel The Big War, published by Appleton-Century-Crofts, was financially and critically successful, resulting in the 1958 film screenplay he wrote with Edward Anhalt re-titled In Love and War, starring Robert Wagner and Bradford Dillman.

In 1960, the Myrers moved back to the Northeast to a country home in Saugerties, New York, and a summer home on Cape Cod, Massachusetts. Little, Brown published The Violent Shore (1962) and The Intruder: A Novel of Boston (1965).

Myrer's most successful novel, Once An Eagle, was published in 1968 by Holt, Rinehart and Winston, during the Vietnam War.

He separated from his wife and divorced her in 1970. Soon afterward he married Patricia Schartle (May 21, 1923 – June 26, 2010).

Myrer wrote three more novels: The Tiger Waits (1973 published by Norton); The Last Convertible (1978, published by Putnam); and A Green Desire in (1981, also published by Putnam).

Anton Myrer died on January 19, 1996, of leukemia at the age of 73. He was survived by his widow. The couple had no children. On February 20, 1996, Patricia Myrer wrote a letter to her close friend, popular Chicago radio personality Art Hellyer, informing him that Anton had suffered from acute leukemia for nine months prior to his death and had been in isolation in a local hospital. She thanked Art Hellyer for the mix tapes that he had sent and said that Anton had died in her arms. On the receipt of Patricia Myrer's letter, Art Hellyer dedicated a four-hour radio show to Anton Myrer.

In March 1997, Anton's widow, Patricia, donated $25,000 to the New York Society Library in memory of her husband who had received books from the library by mail at his home in Saugerties in upstate New York. The donation was used to purchase and preserve quality fiction published until the death of Henry James (1916), and serious literary criticism. A special book-plate was designed to be placed in all volumes bought or rebound from the donated funds. Patricia Myrer also donated case leather-bound volumes of six of his eight novels to the library.

In 1997, Patricia Myrer donated funds to the United States Army War College Foundation and the republication rights to her husband's novel Once An Eagle. The Army War College reprinted the book with citations from the Army War College commandant, Maj. Gen. Robert H. Scales; General John William Vessey, Jr.; and the US Marine Corps commandant General Charles C. Krulak. The book has remained in print ever since and is required reading at the United States Army War College.

In Anton Myrer's honor, the Department of Command, Leadership, and Management of the U.S. Army War College held its first annual Anton Myrer Leadership Symposium at Carlisle Barracks over three days January 26–28, 1999. The department also nominated October 14 every year as Anton Myrer Army Leader Day to provide an opportunity for academics, military and corporate leaders, journalists, and other invited guests to focus attention on leadership issues at the strategic level. It serves as the capstone event for the U.S. Army War College's strategic leadership course. The United States Army War College Foundation presents an award called the Anton Myrer Strategic leadership Writing Award annually on graduation day.

== Bibliography ==
- Evil Under the Sun (1951) – The story of a group of artists, literary figures and locals during a summer on post-war Cape Cod. Prejudices, lingering war trauma, and frustration about the state of post-war America lead to violence. Not to be confused with the Agatha Christie novel of the same name.
- The Big War (1957) – The story of Marines in the Pacific in World War II. It depicts the actual experience of warfare was like for a desperate group of Marines trapped in some of the worst fighting conditions of the war.
- The Violent Shore (1962) – This novel is set just prior to, and during World War II, centering about an extremely neurotic, witty and beautiful young woman, Sally Marcheson, whose compulsive behavior molds the lives of several others.
- The Intruder: A Novel of Boston (1965) – The wife of a prominent architect is assaulted by an unknown intruder in her suburban home in Boston. The incident changes the family's life completely.
- Once An Eagle (1968) – The story of two army officers, one a ruthless, career-obsessed schemer, the other his opposite, and their often intermingled personal and professional lives from the end of World War I to the beginning of the Vietnam War. This novel is reportedly well known among American career military officers for its portrayal of leadership ideals and failures. The book is on the Marine Corps commandants' reading list and the United States Army War College uses it in leadership training. West Point cadets are assigned the book in classes and seminars. It was made into a television miniseries in 1976.
- The Tiger Waits (1973) – The story of one man's rise to academic and then political prominence in an administration, his love-hate relationship with Boston society, and how he discovers and handles a plot that threatens war.
- The Last Convertible (1978) – The story of five Harvard men and their coming-of-age during World War II through the early 1960s New Frontier/Camelot/John F. Kennedy era. The elegant "last convertible" of the title is seen by them as the symbol of their romantic youth. In 1979, the novel was made into a television miniseries.
- A Green Desire (1981) – The story of two brothers from western Massachusetts, the sons of an irresponsible adventurer and the wife he abandoned and left in poverty, one cold, manipulative and selfish, raised in Boston by a wealthy maternal aunt, the other good-hearted, responsible and resourceful, staying with his mother and pulling himself up by his own bootstraps, and the Portuguese-American woman they spent their lives fighting over. Set against the backdrop of the American financial world and the United States' rise to global dominance from the 1910s to just after World War II.

== Film and television adaptations ==
- In Love and War (1958 film)
- Once an Eagle (TV miniseries) (1976)
- The Last Convertible (TV miniseries) (1979)

== See also ==
- List of U.S. Marines
