= Judith Rothschild =

American artist (1921–1993)

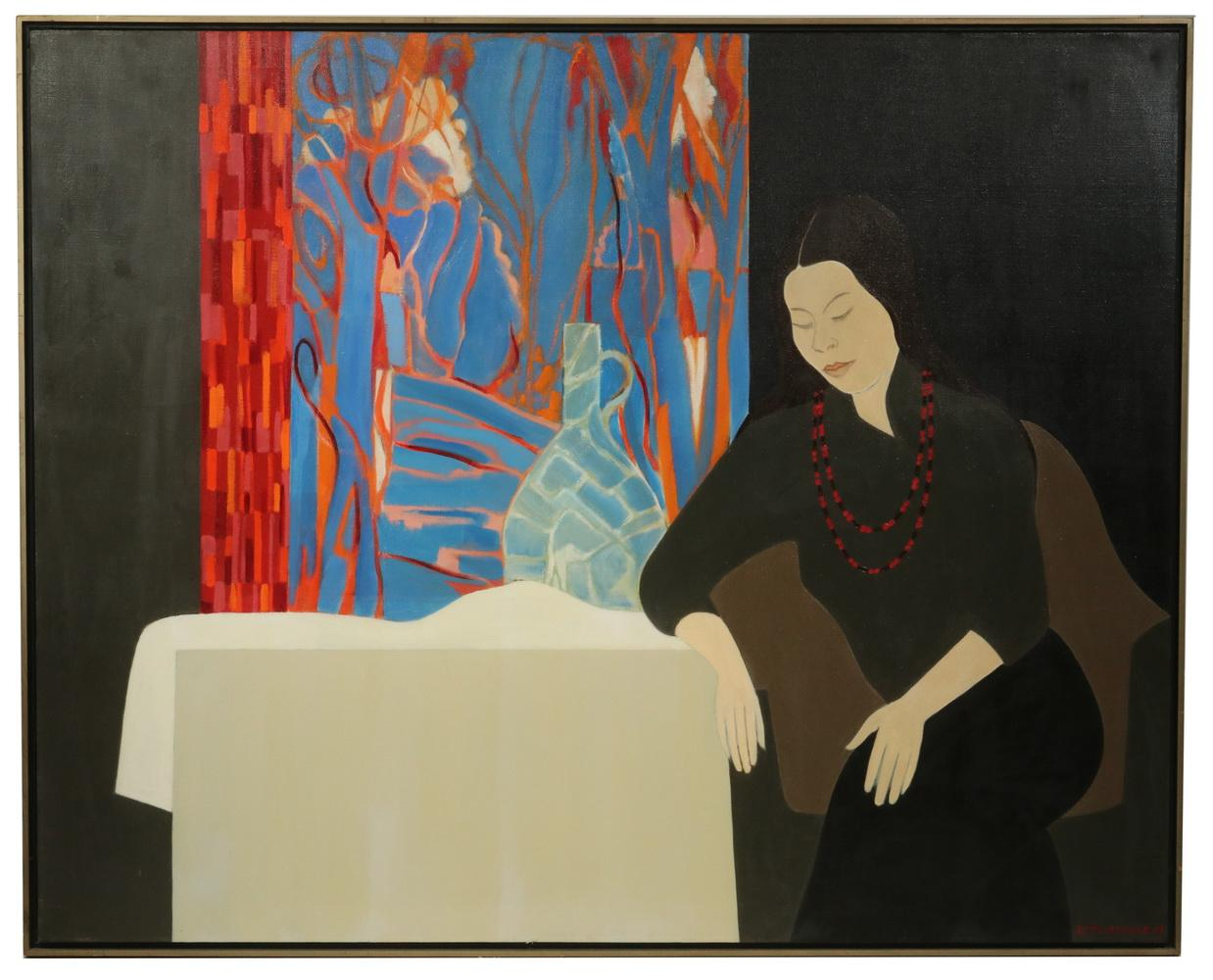
- Judith Rothschild, Self-Portrait with Jug and Painting, 1969, oil on linen, 41 1/4 x 51 1/4 inches
- Born: September 4, 1921; Manhattan, New York
- Died: March 6, 1993 (aged 71); New York City
- Known for: painting, collage, relief
- Movement: abstract art
- Spouse: Anton Myrer (m. 1947; div. 1970)

Judith Rothschild (September 4, 1921 – March 6, 1993) was an American abstract painter and collagist, best known for the collage-like relief paintings she created late in her career. Influenced by European abstract masters, including Piet Mondrian and Henri Matisse, she worked in a style that achieved, in the words of art critic and curator E.C. Goossen, a "bold juxtaposition of the realistic and the abstract".

Rothschild studied with Hans Hofmann and other prominent American artists. In a career spanning the late 1940s to the early 1990s, she exhibited frequently in solo and group shows in the United States and abroad. Her work is held in the collections of major institutions, including the Metropolitan Museum of Art, the National Gallery of Art, the Whitney Museum of American Art, and the Harvard Art Museums.

At her death, Rothschild owned a collection of works said to be "one of the finest privately held collections of 20th-century painting and sculpture in this country". Her will established a foundation to use the sale of these works for the benefit of the underappreciated artists of her generation.

== Early life and education ==
Rothschild was born in New York City to art-loving parents. Her art education began while she was young. While attending New York's Fieldston School, she received training from Victor D'Amico, the head of the school's art department. Graduating in 1939, she entered Wellesley College, a school that then provided instruction in art history but not studio art. For that reason, she obtained art instruction during her summer vacations: in 1940, from artist and art instructor Herman Maril; in 1941, from artist Maurice Sterne; and in 1942, from Zoltan Sepeshy at the Cranbrook Academy of Art. After graduating in the spring of 1943, she took summer classes at the Art Students League, where artist Reginald Marsh was one of her instructors, and later studied with the well-known abstract painter and instructor Hans Hofmann.

In 1944, Rothschild wrote an essay discussing the differences between the non-objective and non-representational style championed by collector Hilla von Rebay and an abstract style that referenced "the material world". She wrote that in negating the material world, non-objective art failed to provide "a sound basis for artistic experience". In contrast, she said, the representational abstractions of artists like Hofmann, Joan Miró, and Paul Klee were "touched with a breath of life".

A year later, both for her own benefit and for the use of other artists, she began translating the art theories of European modernists such as Miró, Max Ernst, Georges Braque, Pablo Picasso, and Jean Arp. She also translated a 1920 essay of Mondrian's explaining his influential neoplastic theory of art.

In the late 1940s, Rothschild studied in a graphics workshop called Atelier 17 run by British artist Stanley William Hayter. To help pay tuition, she served as Hayter's studio monitor.

== Career in art ==
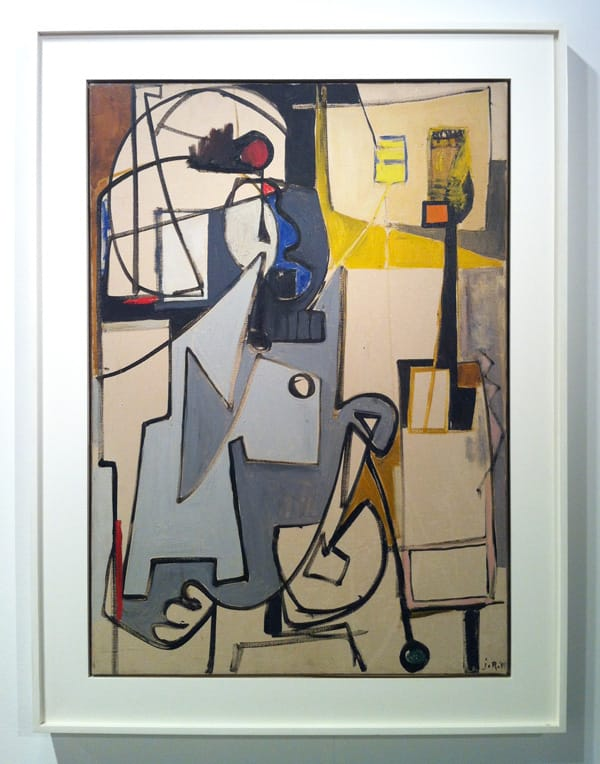
Judith Rothschild, 1945, Mechanical Personages, oil on canvas, 40 x 27 7/8 inches

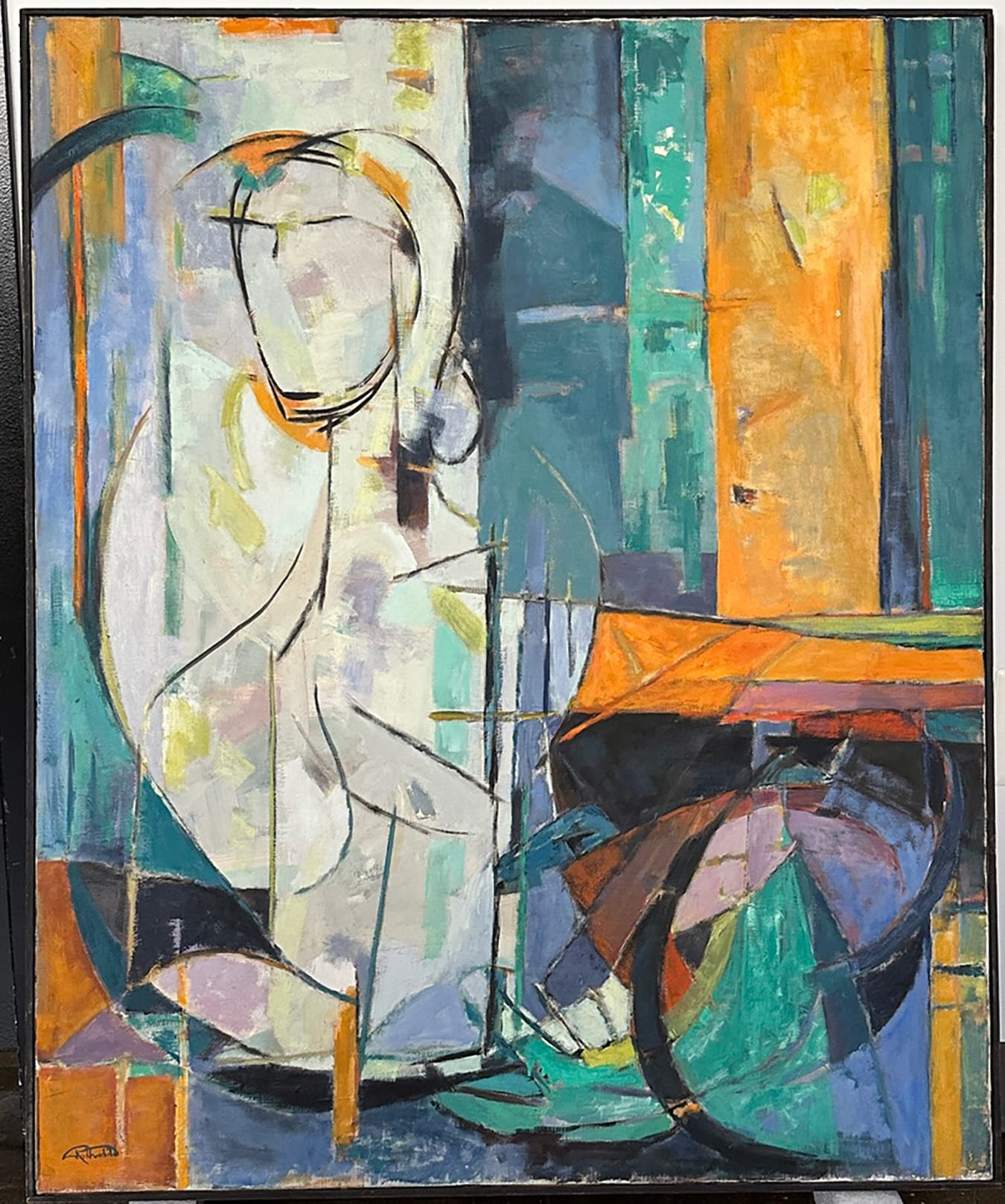
Judith Rothschild, 1959, Portrait of a Young Girl, oil on canvas, 44 x 36 inches

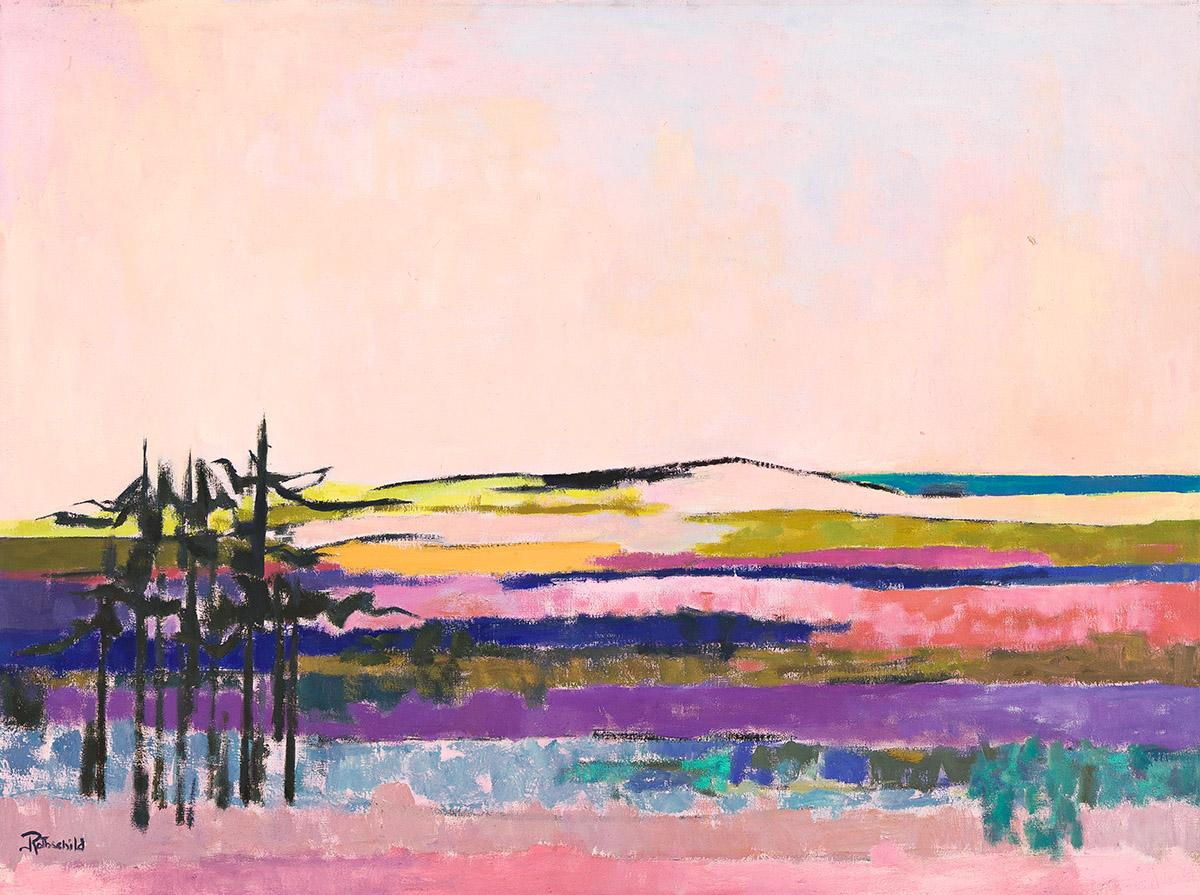
Judith Rothschild, 1966, Provincelands, oil on canvas, 30 x 40 inches

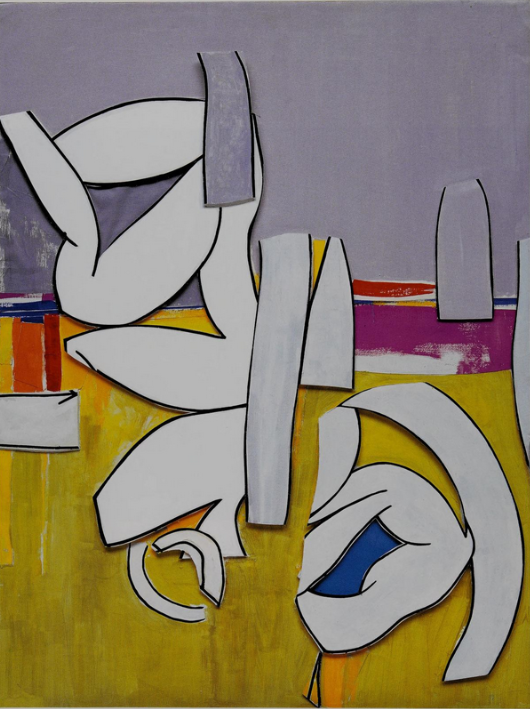
Judith Rothschild, 1972, And Dance upon the Level Shore, relief on foamboard, collage, acrylic, and ink on foamboard, 40 1/8 x 30 1/8 inches

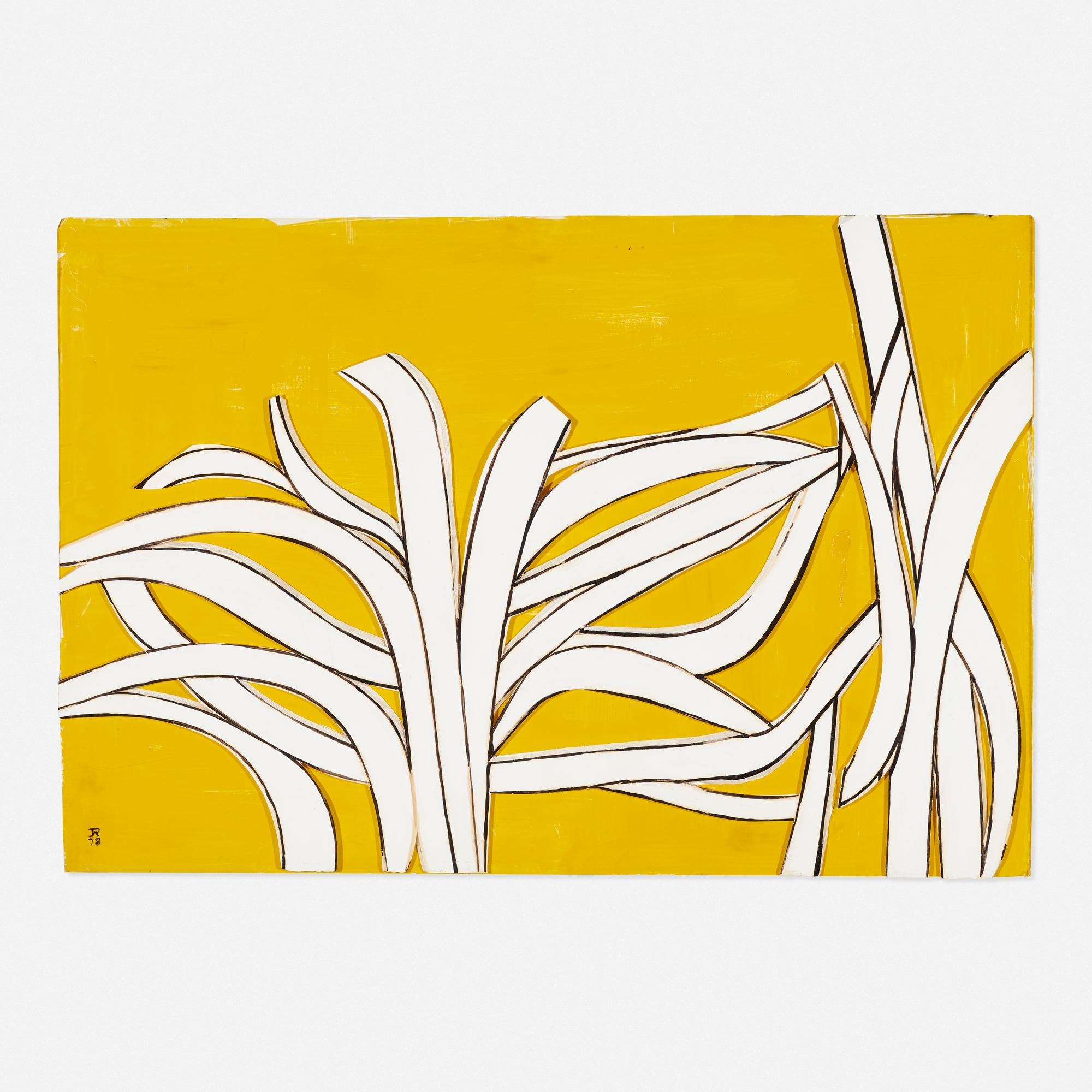
Judith Rothschild, 1978, Forest Paths XV, mixed media and foam core collage, 20 1/4 x 30 inches

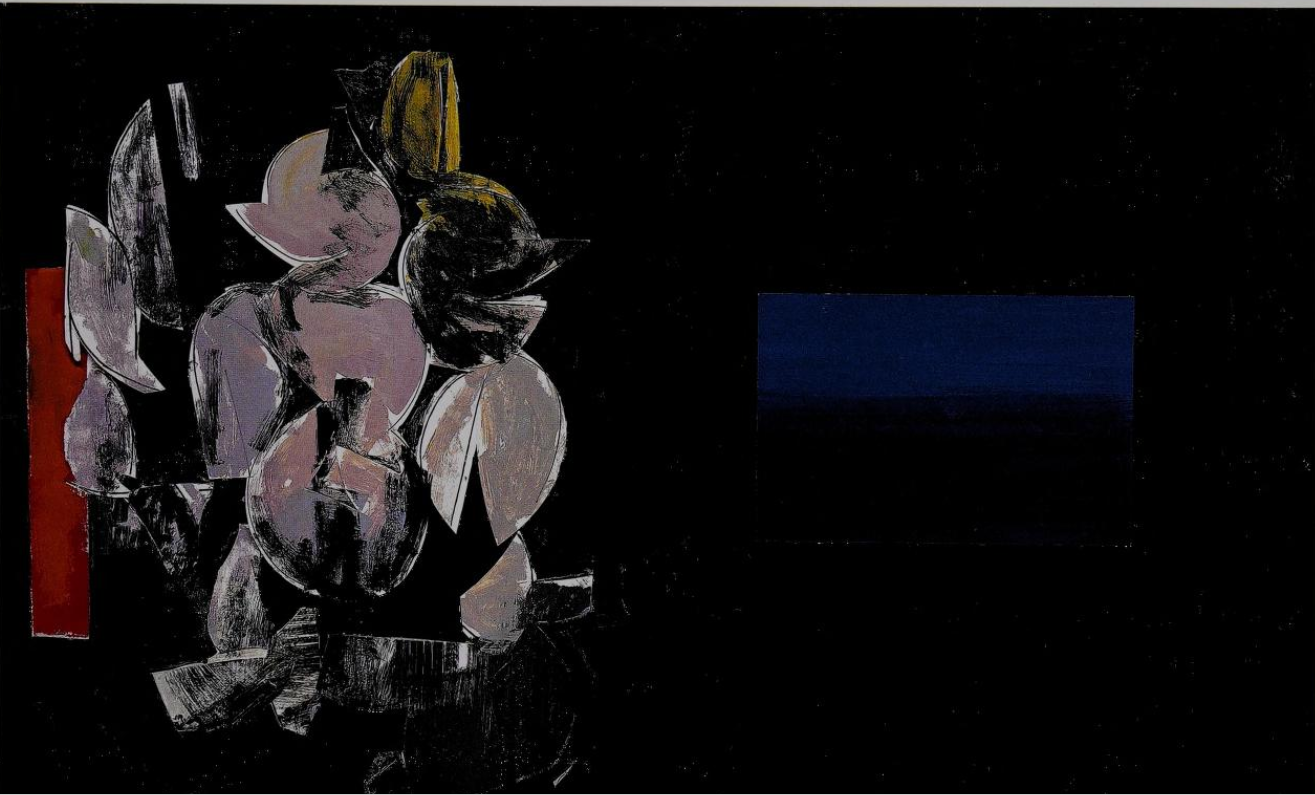
Judith Rothschild, 1890, Skywatch III, relief on foamboard, collage, acrylic, and ink on foamboard, 24 3/4 x 40 inches

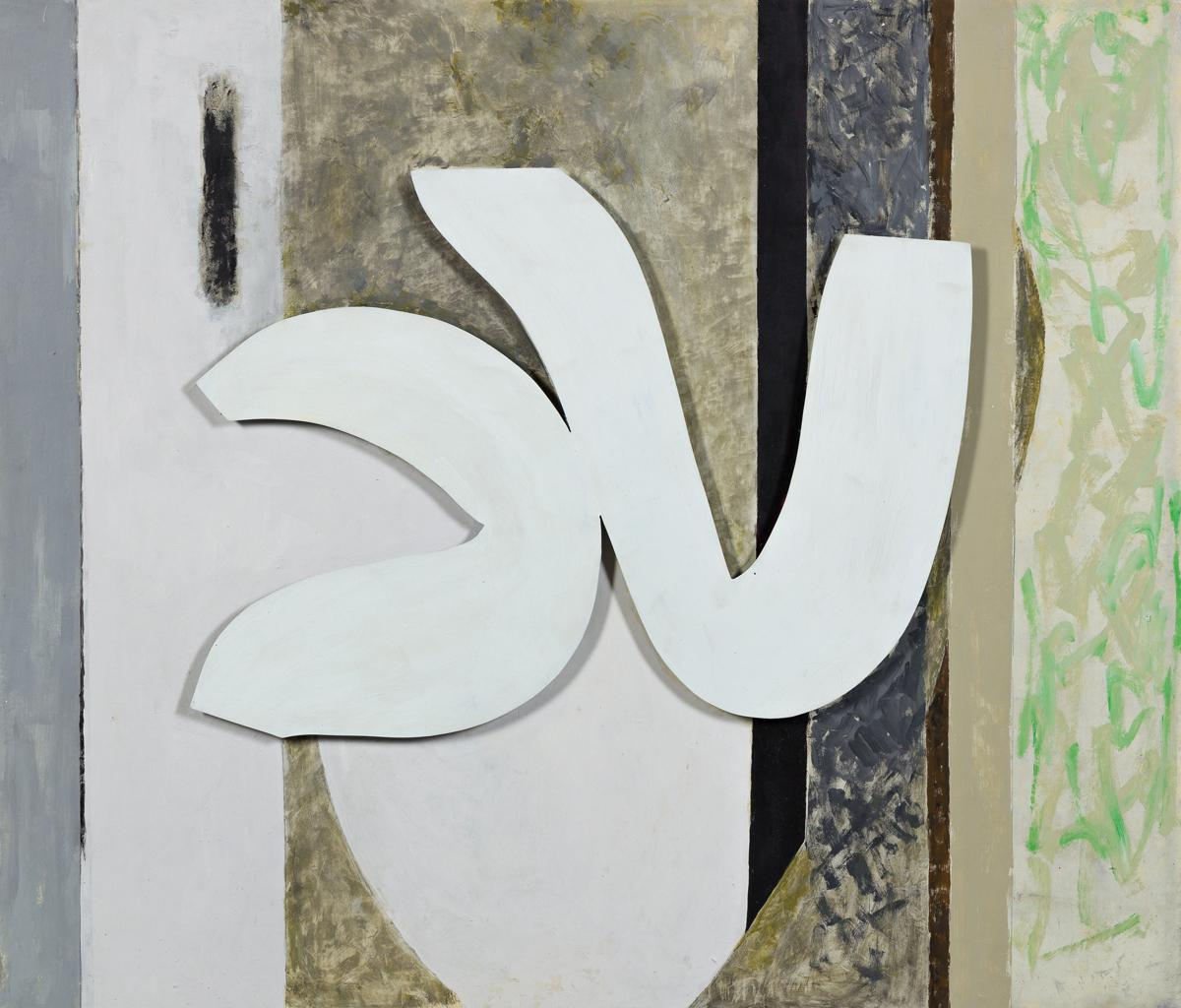
Judith Rothschild, 1987, Grey Eidolon, acrylic on aluminum construction, 32 3/4 x 38 1/4 inches

During her long career, Rothschild participated in many solo and group exhibitions. She showed in commercial and nonprofit galleries as well as museums and other public spaces in the United States and abroad.

=== Selected solo exhibitions in the United States ===
Rothschild's first solo exhibition appeared at the Jane Street Gallery in the winter months of 1945–1946. Operating in a rented Greenwich Village storefront, the gallery was a cooperative venture by a small group of like-minded artists, most of whom had studied with Hans Hofmann and some of whom had come to admire the work of Mondrian and Arp. (Note: In 1943, a small group of young artists had jointly rented a storefront in Greenwich Village to use as a gallery that was later said to be New York's first artist cooperative. During the seven years it existed, its principal members included, in addition to Rothschild, Nell Blaine, Larry Rivers, and Louisa Matthíasdóttir.) (Note: Catalog for this exhibition: Paintings by Judith Rothschild (1946, New York, Jane Street Gallery)) Her show of 20 abstract paintings in oil and gouache drew forth a pair of reviews by artist-poet Ben Wolf in Art Digest and the Herald Tribune. He called her a "remarkable young talent" and said the paintings showed a "sureness and maturity" that belied her age. Rothschild later said she was pleased to have made some sales from the show and especially gratified to receive praise from artist Karl Knaths, who later became a mentor and close associate. In the fall months of 1946, she was one of the first artists shown in a new gallery run by art dealer Joseph Luyber in Manhattan. Reviewing this show, Edward Alden Jewell credited her with a "warm sincerity of purpose" and expressed his confidence that she would learn to express greater individuality. Writing in Art Digest, Ben Wolf saw improvement in these new paintings, saying her color was more integrated and her line better controlled.

The artist Marcel Duchamp had been impressed with the paintings he saw in Rothschild's 1945 solo at the Jane Street Gallery. He introduced Rothschild to gallerist Rose Fried, who, in 1957, gave Rothschild her next solo. (Note: Catalog for this exhibition: Judith Rothschild; September 23 through October 19, 1957 (1957, New York, Rose Fried Gallery)) (Note: One of Rothschild's biographers said Rothschild probably held off staging another solo so as not to upstage her husband, who, during the intervening years, was writing his second and third novels. His second, Once an Eagle, appeared in 1968 and his third, The Violent Shore, in 1957.) In 1962, Rothschild showed new paintings and collages at the recently opened Knapik Gallery on Fifth Avenue. Rose Fried gave Rothschild a second solo in 1965. The following year, Rothschild received a solo exhibition in a Manhattan gallery specializing in modern European masters called La Boétie. (Note: Catalog for this exhibition: Judith Rothschild; recent landscapes; February 13 through March 9 (1966, New York, La Boétie Gallery))

In 1972, she received the first of several solos at Manhattan's Landmark Gallery. In 1975 and again in 1976, the New York art publisher and gallerist Lee Ault showed recent relief paintings of hers at his Manhattan gallery. (Note: Catalog for the 1976 exhibition: Judith Rothschild. Nov. 17 - Dec. 18, 1976 (1976, New York, Lee Ault)) Reviewing the first show in the New York Times, Hilton Kramer said Rothschild possessed considerable talent and, in her Matisse-like reliefs, came close to freeing herself entirely from being "locked into the master's repertory of shapes and gestures".

In 1977, she was given her first museum solo, an exhibition at the Neuberger Museum of Art, at the State University of New York, Purchase. The following year, she participated in the first of four joint solo exhibitions with members of the Long Point Gallery group, a cooperative formed the previous year in Provincetown, by a small group that included Rothschild, Robert Motherwell, Leo Manso, and Fritz Bultman. (Note: The members of the cooperative were long-term Provincetown residents who worked in a wide range of representational and abstract styles. As much a club as a nonprofit business, the gallery provided space for its members to meet for informal discussions over wine and cheese while they planned its shows and partied. Having begun at a time when galleries were scarce on the Cape, it continued for about 20 years until the sale of the building in which it was located.)

In 1987 and 1988, the Gimpel Gallery gave her solo exhibitions, and in 1989 the Inger Gallery gave her one. In 1988, she received a solo exhibition at the Pennsylvania Academy of the Fine Arts, (Note: Catalog for the exhibition: Judith Rothschild, relief paintings, 1972-1987 (by Richard H. Axsom, 1988, Philadelphia and Portland, Pennsylvania Academy of the Fine Arts and Portland Museum of Art)) and in 1992, the André Zarre Gallery gave her what turned out to be the final solo in a Manhattan gallery before her death.

=== Selected solo exhibitions in Europe ===
When she showed at the Iolas-Jackson Gallery in 1985, John Russell of the New York Times noted the influence of Matisse and called the result "sumptuous" in general effect.

In 1976, 1981, and 1985, Rothschild received solo exhibitions in the Annely Juda Fine Art gallery in London. (Note: Exhibition catalog for the 1976 exhibition: Judith Rothschild (1976, London, Annely Juda Fine Art)) (Note: Catalog for the 1981 exhibition: Judith Rothschild; relief paintings; 12 March-11 April, 1981 (1981, London, Annely Juda Fine Art)) In 1981, 1988, and 1989, she received solo exhibitions at Galerie Gmurzynska in Cologne. In 1981, she showed at the Centro di Cultura de Palazzo Grassi, Venice. (Note: Catalog for this exhibition: Judith Rothschild; relief/collages (1983, Cologne, Galerie Gmurzynska))

One of Rothschild's most remarkable exhibitions took place in Moscow in 1991, as the Soviet era drew to a close. It took place at the State Tretyakov Gallery, a museum that holds a large collection of Russian art and is listed as one of the most visited museums in the world. She was the first living Western artist and the first non-Russian-born artist to be given a solo exhibition there. A catalog of the exhibition, Beyond the Plane: The Relief Paintings of Judith Rothschild, by Richard H. Axsom (New York, Hudson Hills Press) appeared in 1992.

=== Selected group exhibitions ===
Rothschild's paintings appeared in group exhibitions in the United States and abroad. Her works appeared in shows held in Manhattan by American Abstract Artists as well as the Grand Central Galleries, New York Coliseum, La Boétie Gallery, Landmark Gallery, and Luyber Galleries. She showed in Boston with the Boston Society of Independent Artists, at the Institute of Contemporary Art and the Mirsky Gallery; in Chicago at the Art Institute; and in Provincetown with the Provincetown Art Association and Museum, Long Point Gallery, HCE Gallery, and Gallery 200. Group shows in London were mounted at the Juda gallery, in Paris at the Palais des Beaux-Arts de la Ville de Paris, in Milan at Galleria Milano, and in Cologne at Galerie Gmurzynska.

=== Studio locations ===
In 1945 and 1946, Rothschild worked in her first studio, located on West 12th Street in Manhattan. In 1946, she began spending summers in Provincetown. After marrying the novelist Anton Myrer, she moved to California and in 1947 worked in Carmel, later moving to Monterey, where she worked from that year until 1956. She returned to Manhattan in 1956 and spent the next two years in Europe, where she worked in the studio formerly used by Nicolas de Staël in Cap d'Antibes. In 1958, she moved to Wellfleet on Cape Cod and in 1959 began splitting her work year between there and Saugerties, New York. In 1970, she moved into a townhouse on Park Avenue near East 90th, and, in 1978, needing more space, began working in Barnett Newman's old studio in a building adjoining Carnegie Hall on 7th Avenue.

=== Other career milestones ===
In addition to making works of art, Rothschild studied art theories, wrote art essays, and achieved prestigious sales of her works. She participated in artist cooperatives and art associations. She produced book illustrations and taught art classes.

Her first exhibition in 1945 produced substantial sales. The art dealer Karl Nierendorf, art historian Jere Abbott, and museum director Agnes Mongan were among the visitors who bought paintings from that show.

She helped to found the Long Point cooperative in 1977. She joined American Abstract Artists in 1946 and was then its youngest member. In 1978, she was elected its president.

In 1970, she was named the American representative for the French journal Leonardo and wrote an article for its pages called "On the Use of a Color-Music Analogy and on Chance in Paintings".

In 1971, she produced illustrations for a book of poems by Robin Fulton called The Spaces Between the Stones is Where The Survivors Live. (New York, New Rivers Press).

In 1971 and 1972, Rothschild taught advanced drawing as an artist-in-residence at Syracuse University and taught summer classes at both Pratt Institute and the Rhode Island School of Design.

During her career, she served on the boards of the American Federation of Arts, the MacDowell residency program, the New York Studio School, and the Provincetown Fine Arts Work Center.

== Artistic style ==
Throughout her five decades of painting, Rothschild remained true to her modernist foundations while cohesively incorporating new methods, materials, and ideas.

— Exhibition of relief paintings by Judith Rothschild, Indiana University, 2023–2024

Critics noted three periods in the development of Rothschild's style. The first combined biomorphic and geometric elements, the second sometimes drew upon impersonal theories of color and musical composition and at other times incorporated figurative elements, and the third produced a dramatic change of medium that defined her mature style.

=== Early career, 1940s–1950s ===
During the first stylistic period of her career, Rothschild made paintings and collages that art historian and curator Richard H. Axsom saw as reflecting the European tradition of abstraction, showing influences of Cubism, Surrealism, and geometric abstraction. During this period, she made use of the art theories she had translated in her student years, including her 1944 essay on non-objective art that contrasted the abstract art that had its foundation in the real world with abstract art that did not. In translating Mondrian's neo-plasticism essay, she made note of his statement that art must reflect the material world the artist inhabits.

By the early 1950s, Rothschild had begun to make explicit the natural sources of her work. Two New York Times critics did not welcome this change in Rothschild's style. One complained of "figurative intrusions into her abstract compositions" at this time, and, reviewing a 1957 solo exhibition, another saw "a feeling toward nature that is too ambiguously expressed to be satisfactory".

=== Middle career, 1950s–1960s ===
Rothschild's paintings of the mid- and late 1950s often contained, as a critic noted, warm colors and lyrical arcs, "making the paintings fresh, pleasurable experiences in which the artist declares her independence of inherited forms and her serious intention of charting her own purposeful course of discovery.". Richard H. Axsom said her style was "against the American grain of the moment" at this time, neither the product of "unfettered impulse", like some of the abstract-expressionist artists, nor formalist and hard-edge like the minimalists. Some of her paintings at this time used coastal motifs while others drew upon mythological themes.

Rothschild's mid-career style was also partly characterized by a fascination with Wilhelm Ostwald's color theory and its relationship to music compositions. Her interest in the subject evolved as her working partnership with Knaths developed from the late 1940s through the early 1950s. She stated in a 1968 interview that Knaths did not adhere closely to the system but would often abandon it once he began to feel comfortable with a painting he was working on. She said, "It was like a security blanket for him. He would get all this out, then when he got into it, he felt pretty free doing whatever he wanted to do." She liked the theory behind the system because she had trained as a pianist while studying art when young and found close relationships between color values and music compositions. She reported, however, that in the end, the system "really wrecked my painting for a while".

=== Late career, 1970s–1980s ===
Although she made some gouaches and ink drawings from the 1940s to the 1960s, Rothschild then mostly made oil paintings and collages. In 1971, after seeing an exhibition of Matisse cutouts in Paris, she began using acrylic pigments and added relief elements to her paintings, first using bristol board and then foamcore. This new technique gave her work a three-dimensional character. In 1975, she wrote in her journal: "I think I have found a way to increase the depth of the picture at the same time I am preserving [its] incredible flatness. The forward planes of the relief are really pushing back in a way, whereas some of the back planes, with the color push forward. This is the nearest I can come to explaining the fascination this medium has for me."

Throughout the 1970s, this new format, called relief painting, usually featured foamcore collage elements on top of white foamcore sheets that she had strengthened with plaster. The simplicity, choice of colors, and design of these paintings often reminded viewers of Matisse's cut-paper collages.

In the 1980s, Rothschild varied her style by adding rectangular pictorial elements and sometimes replacing foamcore with metal for both support and relief elements. She also began working in a larger scale. Her last works were considerably larger than earlier ones. Although still rectangular, they measured as much as 90 by 60 inches as opposed to the earlier easel-sized paintings.

== Artistic achievements and legacy ==
Throughout her career, Rothschild sought new ways to express herself in art. In 1990, she expressed this search in an exchange with her biographer Jack D. Flam. He had recommended that she continue to work in a style he particularly admired, and she responded, "but I can already do that; it's too easy." In carrying out her search for originality, Rothschild constantly focused on the dichotomy between subjectivity and objectivity. In the mid-1950s, she addressed the subject in her journals. In writing about the contrast between "the realization of the picture" and "the realization of the Mountain" in Cézanne's paintings of Mont St. Victoire, she said, "The expression of subjective emotions alone cannot suffice, still less mere concrete specifics.... The idea is in the mountain: in the mountain rendered eloquently, structured, expanded, which recalls us to our own humanity, our own individual importance."

Addressing this concept in 1956, art critic and curator E.C. Goossen said Rothschild was breaking through to "an area that has been too little explored" in her "bold juxtaposition of the realistic and the abstract". In 1978, a New York Times critic said, "Her work at once emphasizes the sensual and the cerebral". In 1981, art dealer and writer John Bernard Myers said Rothschild was able to "bring a picture's substance to an edge of certainty, or what we call reality" while also revealing "the ambiguities and contradictions of the unknowable cosmos." In 1992, Richard Axsom said Rothschild successfully mediated between "factual" elements in her paintings and the paintings' "imaginary pictorial space". In 1998, Grace Glueck wrote simply that Rothschild seemed "to have resolved her long conflict between abstraction and figuration."

=== Posthumous exhibitions ===
In the years following her death, Rothschild's work received a significant number of solo exhibitions, including a major retrospective at the Metropolitan Museum of Art in 1998 that subsequently traveled in modified form to the Phillips Collection in Washington, DC, in 1999 and the San Francisco Museum of Modern Art in 2001-2002.

Other posthumous retrospective and solo exhibitions included two shows at the Knoedler Gallery in Manhattan in 2002 and 2004, (Note: Catalog for the 2002 exhibition: Judith Rothschild; Image and Abstraction : January 17-March 2, 2002 by Karen Wilkin (2002, New York, Knoedler)) (Note: Catalog for the 2004 exhibition: Judith Rothschild; Abstract and Non-objective by David Cohen (2004, New York, Knoedler)) at the Von der Heydt-Museum in Wuppertal, Germany, in 2003, (Note: Catalog for the exhibition: Judith Rothschild by Joseph Kiblitsky (2003, Bad Breisig, Germany, Von der Heydt-Museum)) and at Galerie Crone in Berlin in 2006. She was also given posthumous and retrospective shows at the Bentley Gallery in Scottsdale, AZ, in 2001; the State Russian Museum in Saint Petersburg in 2002; Art Basel in Miami Beach in 2002; and in Galerie Gmurzynska in Cologne in 2004. Other posthumous solo exhibitions took place in Chicago (Valerie Carberry Gallery, 2013), in New York (Kraushaar Galleries, 2020), in Bloomington (Indiana University, 2023), and in Portland, Maine (Moss Galleries, 2024).

Her work appeared with Manso's and Motherwell's in a trio show at the Century Association in Manhattan in 1994 and in a 1996 show called "Encounters with Modern Art" that included works from Rothschild's parents' collection with some of her own. This show traveled to the National Gallery of Art, the Philadelphia Museum of Art, and the San Francisco Museum of Modern Art.

=== Art collection and foundation ===
Rothschild collected art and received art from her parents' estate. Critics considered her parents' collection of 180 works to be, as one said, "one of the finest privately held collections of 20th-century painting and sculpture in this country", or, as another said, "a virtual history of the European avant-garde" in the 20th century. At the time of Rothschild's death, the combined collection included ten paintings by Piet Mondrian, nine by Juan Gris, five by Henri Matisse, four by Fernand Léger, three by Pablo Picasso, and two by Constantin Brâncuși.

Rothschild's will established a foundation to handle all the works of art in her estate. The foundation's tax returns gave its mission statement in these words: "The Judith Rothschild Foundation was created by the will of the painter Judith Rothschild to stimulate interest in recently deceased American painters, sculptors, and photographers whose work is of the highest quality but lacks wide recognition. Ms. Rothschild's goal for the foundation was to increase the public understanding of such lesser-known and insufficiently appreciated artists—affording their work the opportunity for public viewing, institutional acquisition, and critical reassessment." The will gave one person responsibility for running the foundation, but there have been disputes about how much freedom that person had in carrying out his duties. In 2006, he said the will "left some things formulated generally," giving him the freedom to conduct "special projects" on behalf of the foundation. Others have said the will did not grant him such broad authority. In 2005, the editors of the journal Art on Paper wrote that the foundation was wrong to spend millions of dollars in buying art that was unrelated to the foundation's objectives. In 2010, a critic for the New York Times wrote, "Ms. Rothschild's will directed that her foundation primarily promote contemporary American artists who had recently died, and it specified her objection to conceptual art. But many of the works [the foundation's trustee] bought were conceptual in nature, by artists like Lawrence Weiner and Robert Barry. Other artists were based in Europe. Most were alive." Although the foundation was required to close down on March 6, 2018, the trustee obtained permission from the attorney general's office of New York State to continue operations. The Foundation Directory online database listed the Judith Rothschild Foundation as in operation as of January 16, 2026.

== Personal life and family ==
Rothschild was born on September 4, 1921, in New York City. Her father, Herbert Rothschild, was a successful furniture manufacturer, and her mother, Nanette (Friend) Rothschild, was a teacher who left that profession to raise her family and help put together a world-class art collection. Both were descended from German-Jewish families. They raised their children in the secular beliefs of Ethical Culture. Despite his surname, there is no evidence Herbert Rothschild was connected to the German Rothschild banking family.

Rothschild had an older brother, Robert, and a younger sister, Barbara, both of whom survived her. She married novelist Anton Myrer in 1947 and divorced him in 1970.

She died of a stroke in Manhattan aged 71 on March 6, 1993. The New York Ethical Culture Society gave her a memorial tribute on May 10, 1993, at which Neil Rudenstine gave the opening and closing remarks.
