= Patricia Schartle Myrer =

- Born: Patricia Schartle; 21 May 1923
- Died: 26 June 2010 (aged 87); Saugerties, New York, United States
- Education: University of North Carolina
- Occupations: Editor, Literary agent, Publishing executive
- Spouse: Anton Myrer

Patricia Schartle Myrer (1923–2010) was an editor, literary agent and publishing executive based in New York City. She was editor-in-chief of Appleton-Century-Crofts publishing. She eventually became president of McIntosh & Otis literary agency. She married novelist Anton Myrer in 1970. Some of the authors she represented were Mary Higgins Clark, Patricia Highsmith and Eleanor Hibbert. She retired in 1984 and died in 2010.

== Personal life ==
Patricia Schartle grew up in Asheville, North Carolina. Her father was a drug wholesaler. She was the youngest of seven children. In 1942, at the age of 19, she married a submarine sailor, who was killed in the Second World War six months later. After graduation from the University of North Carolina with a degree in English Literature, she moved to New York City in 1947 to start her career in publishing. While working as a literary agent, she divided her time between an apartment in Brooklyn Heights and a farmhouse in the Catskills.

Schartle initially met novelist Anton Myrer in 1957 and became his literary agent. She is credited with helping him shape three of his novels into best-sellers: The Big War, The Last Convertible and Once an Eagle. She is also credited with selling the movie rights of The Big War (which was made into the 1958 film, In Love and War) and The Last Convertible (which was made into a TV mini-series in 1979). They got married in 1970, after which she changed her name to Patricia Schartle Myrer. While working as a literary agent, she divided her time between an apartment in Brooklyn Heights and a farmhouse in the Catskills.

Anton Myrer died on January 19, 1996, of leukemia at the age of 73. He was survived by Patricia, his widow. The couple had no children.

In March 1997, Patricia Schartle Myrer donated $25,000 to the New York Society Library in memory of her husband who had received books from the library by mail at his home in Saugerties in upstate New York. She also donated case leather-bound volumes of six of his eight novels to the library.

In 1997, Patricia Schartle Myrer donated funds to the United States Army War College Foundation and the republication rights to her husband's novel Once An Eagle.

Patricia Schartle Myrer died in 2010 at her home in Saugerties, New York.

== Career ==
Schartle joined the Appleton-Century company in 1947 where she eventually held every position in the company, including advertising director. In 1954, she became its editor-in-chief, a position never before held by a woman in the world of New York publishing.

In 1958 Schartle became a partner in New-York based agency Constance Smith Associates. In 1963 Constance Smith retired and the agency merged with McIntosh & Otis, a literary agency based in New York City. Schartle became President of the combined agency, a position she held till her retirement in 1984.

== Authors represented ==
=== Eleanor Hibbert ===
In 1948, Schartle became Eleanor Hibbert's first editor when she worked on her very first Jean Plaidy book Beyond the Blue Hills (1947). In 1960 Schartle helped to revive the Gothic romance genre when she persuaded Eleanor Hibbert to write a new series of novels under the name Victoria Holt.

"She started my career as a bestseller. I've heard she's the best agent in the U.S., which would mean the world, wouldn't it?"
—Eleanor Hibbert

=== Mary Higgins Clark ===
In 1956 Schartle met novelist Mary Higgins Clark through a writer's workshop and became her literary agent for twenty years until her retirement. Schartle and Higgins Clark became such good friends that Higgins Clark named her fifth and last child Patricia Mary for their "winning combination".

"Pat invited me to come in to her office. When I arrived, she announced she had decided to represent me. She was a young agent. I was a young writer. Being taken on by her proved to be the kindness of the gods."
—Mary Higgins Clark

=== Patricia Highsmith ===
Patricia Highsmith appointed Patricia Schartle as her literary agent in 1959, when Schartle was with Constance Smith Associates. After Constance Smith Associates merged with McIntosh & Otis in 1963, Schartle continued as Patricia Highsmith's American literary agent. A. M. Heath served as Patricia Highsmith's British agents. Over time, Patricia Highsmith came to resent the 5% commission each literary agency took. Patricia Schartle Myrer fired Highsmith as her client in 1979.

=== Noah Gordon ===
In 1965 Schartle helped Noah Gordon become a serious novelist by getting him a book contract with a publishing firm after he submitted an outline for a novel to Schartle. It was at Schartle's suggestion that Gordon then wrote the Cole trilogy, a series of books about the dynasty of a single family over many generations.

== Bibliography ==
- America Remembers: Our Best-Loved Customs and Traditions (1956, ISBN 1-135-42923-5, Hanover House, Hardcover, 669 pages) by Samuel Rapport (Editor), Patricia Schartle (Editor)
