= In Love and War (1958 film) =

1958 film by Philip Dunne

- Theatrical release poster
- Directed by: Philip Dunne
- Written by: Edward Anhalt
- Based on: The Big War; 1957 novel by Anton Myrer
- Produced by: Jerry Wald
- Starring: Robert Wagner; Dana Wynter; Jeffrey Hunter
- Cinematography: Leo Tover
- Edited by: William Reynolds
- Music by: Hugo Friedhofer
- Distributed by: 20th Century Fox
- Release date: October 28, 1958
- Running time: 111 minutes
- Country: United States
- Language: English
- Budget: $1.59 million
- Box office: $2.5 million (US rentals)

In Love and War is a 1958 American CinemaScope and DeLuxe Color film set in World War II, directed by Philip Dunne. It is based on the 1957 novel The Big War by Anton Myrer. Myrer was a former Marine wounded during the Second Battle of Guam in 1944.

== Plot ==
The film traces the progress of three Marines on shore leave in San Francisco during World War II. One of the men, Nico, is a seasoned, decorated platoon sergeant; the second, Frankie, is a perennial goof-off, who drinks too much; and the third, Alan, is an intellectual from a wealthy family. He has joined the Marines, despite his father's protests.

Nico proposes and marries his pregnant girlfriend, Andrea. A drunken Frankie fights with Charlie Stanton, his hateful stepfather, who thinks him a coward. The wealthy Alan catches his fiancée, Sue, with another man. After realizing Sue has repeatedly cheated on him, Alan ends the engagement, despite Sue's pleas.

Alan and Frankie later meet up at an elite hotel where Alan's family has a permanent suite. There they find the newlywed Nico and Andrea. After finding out that the newlyweds had hoped to spend their wedding night at the hotel, but found that it was booked, Alan gives them the key to the suite, much to Frankie's protest, and has the staff charge all expenses to his family's account.

Lorraine, who is in love with Frankie, has joined the military as a WAVE. She introduces his friend Alan to her roommate Kalai, a nurse of Hawaiian French heritage. Kalai and Alan quickly become attracted to each other. Kalai tells Alan that her parents were killed during the attack on Pearl Harbor. They all go to Lorraine's apartment, where Frankie first passes out, then wakes up screaming at the thought of returning to the war. Lorraine decides to leave him. Kalai and Alan later profess their love to each other. She later sees him off, while cursing the war for taking another loved one from her.

The three men return to the Pacific front. Frankie initially shows cowardice, and Nico slaps some sense into him. Later, Frankie saves Alan and is honored for his heroism. He later sends the medal and the letter of recognition home where his mom stands up to his stepfather and tells him to never disrespect Frankie again. Alan becomes ill with dengue fever and when a wounded Japanese soldier calls out to him for help, he tries to give the Japanese soldier some water, but Nico shoots the wounded soldier and reveals to Alan and the other Marines that a grenade was hidden under the wounded soldier as a trap. Alan then begins to question the futility of the war. When an advancing enemy tank threatens the platoon, Nico singlehandedly blows up the tank but dies from his wounds. Frankie, Alan, and the rest of the group are devastated, but Frankie, having greatly changed thanks to Nico, steps into Nico's role and leads the remaining soldiers forward.

Back home, Andrea gives birth to a baby boy and raises him with the help of both her and Nico's family. Kalai continues to work at the hospital where she learns that Sue was admitted after she tried to commit suicide after being assaulted by one of her lovers. Kalai visits her in an attempt to provide comfort, but Sue dies of shock from severe alcohol withdrawal. Kalai later visits Alan's father to ask for a way to contact him. At first wary of her, he softens when he realizes that she truly cares for his son, and Kalai is able to get him to accept his son for who he is.

The war ends and Alan returns and becomes a professor at the local university, with his father's blessing, and happily reunites with Kalai. Frankie, now promoted to sergeant, brings Nico's last love letter home to Andrea and their son who is now a young boy. Andrea tells Frankie, who has decided to stay in the Marines that she would like to see him again.

== Cast ==
- Robert Wagner as Pvt. Frank "Frankie" O'Neill
- Dana Wynter as Sue Trumbell
- Jeffrey Hunter as Plt Sgt. Nico Kantaylis
- Hope Lange as Andrea Lenaine
- Bradford Dillman as PFC Alan Newcombe
- Sheree North as Lorraine
- France Nuyen as Kalai Ducanne
- Mort Sahl as Danny Krieger
- Steven Gant as Babe Ricardo
- Harvey Stephens as Amory Newcombe
- Paul Comi as Father Wallensack
- Joe Di Reda as Capistron
- Buck Class as Derek
- Murvyn Vye as Charlie Scanlon
- Mary Patton as Grace Scanlon
- Veronica Cartwright as Allie O'Neill
- Brian Corcoran as Bobby O'Neill
- Nelson Leigh as Lt. Col. Herron
- Ray Montgomery as Lieutenant
- James Philbrook as Sue's Boyfriend

== Production ==
Jerry Wald, who had a deal with Fox, bought the screen rights to The Big War in March 1957. It was one of a number of war novels bought by Fox at the time, including The Young Lions, The Hunters and The Enemy Below.

At one stage the film was known as Hell Raisers before being titled In Love and War. Wald wanted Lee Remick, Richard Widmark and Ben Gazzara to play the leads.

Bradford Dillman and Robert Wagner were cast in April 1958. Jeff Hunter and France Nuyen were cast in June. It was the last of several collaborations between Wagner and Hunter.

Filming started in June 1958. Dunne says filming started with "half a script" and he had to do writing on location in the Pacific.

On his comedy album 1960 or Look Forward In Anger, Sahl said he wrote 16 pages of dialogue for his character and the other Marines but most of the material was edited from the final print. Director Phillip Dunne asked the producer Jerry Wald why Sahl's name was not on the posters or advertisements. Wald responded that he was told that there was nothing in Sahl's contract that required him to receive any billing. Wald signed Sahl on to a personal contract with the intention of casting him as a beatnik in The Best of Everything (1959)

== Release ==
The film had its premiere in San Diego on October 28, 1958, and then opened in 600 theaters.

In October 1958, Wald predicted the film would make between $6–10 million worldwide.

== See also ==
- List of American films of 1958
