= McIntosh & Otis =

Literary agency based in New York City

- Founded: 1928
- Founder: Mavis McIntosh (1906-1986), Elizabeth Otis
- Type: Literary agency
- Headquarters: New York City, New York
- Location: United States
- CEO: Eugene H. (Gene) Winick
- President: Elizabeth Winick Rubinstein
- Literary Agent: Christa Heschke
- Website: mcintoshandotis.com

McIntosh & Otis is a literary agency based in New York City. It was incorporated in 1928 by Mavis McIntosh and Elizabeth Otis. The agency handles literary estates and subsidiary rights for the authors that it represents.

== History ==
Mavis McIntosh (1906-1986) and Elizabeth Otis founded McIntosh & Otis in the mid 1920s, after they quit the literary agency at which they were working because they were dissatisfied with its practices. In 1928, they incorporated the firm, and by the early 1930s, it was a reputable and successful literary agency.

In 1963, McIntosh & Otis merged with New-York based agency Constance Smith Associates. Patricia Schartle Myrer, who was a partner at Constance Smith Associates, became President of McIntosh & Otis.

In the 1970s, McIntosh & Otis hired Eugene Winick, a copyright attorney, as outside counsel to represent the literary estates of authors represented by McIntosh & Otis, such as Mary Higgins Clark, Harper Lee, Sinclair Lewis, Ayn Rand, and Thomas Wolfe. In 1984, Patricia Schartle Myrer retired and appointed Eugene Winick as President of McIntosh & Otis.

In 2001, Samuel Pinkus, a literary agent at McIntosh & Otis and Eugene Winick's son-in-law, took over as President of the agency but left in 2004.

Elizabeth Winick Rubinstein, Eugene Winick's daughter, is currently the President of McIntosh & Otis.

== Authors represented ==
- Erskine Caldwell
- John Hersey
- Eleanor Hibbert
- Mary Higgins Clark
- Patricia Highsmith
- Harper Lee
- Sinclair Lewis
- Walker Percy
- Ayn Rand
- Upton Sinclair
- John Steinbeck
- Phyllis Whitney
- Thomas Wolfe

=== John Steinbeck ===
In 1931, John Steinbeck sent McIntosh & Otis a number of his early manuscripts based on the recommendation of Carl Wilhelmson. McIntosh & Otis gave Steinbeck positive encouragement, and he stuck with the firm as his only literary agency for the rest of his career, spanning nearly 40 years.

In 1952, McIntosh & Otis sold the film rights of Steinbeck's classic novel East of Eden (1952) to Warner Brothers, which adapted it as a 1955 movie starring James Dean. Steinbeck received $125,000 for the film rights, plus 25 percent of the profits.

When Steinbeck won the 1962 Nobel Prize for literature, he gave McIntosh & Otis a percentage of the award money out of gratitude for their support.

In 2004, McIntosh & Otis sold the film rights of Steinbeck's classic novel East of Eden to Universal Pictures, after the book was chosen for Oprah's Book Club list. The option expired, and Universal had to once again obtain the film rights. A forthcoming two-film series, starring Jennifer Lawrence, was scheduled for production as of April 2014.

=== Patricia Highsmith ===
Patricia Highsmith appointed Patricia Schartle Myrer as her literary agent in 1959, when Myrer was with Constance Smith Associates. After Constance Smith Associates merged with McIntosh & Otis in 1963, Myrer continued as Patricia Highsmith's American literary agent. A. M. Heath served as Patricia Highsmith's British agents. Over time, Patricia Highsmith came to resent the 5% commission each literary agency took, and Myrer fired Highsmith in 1979.

== Literary agents ==
- Patricia Schartle Myrer
- Eugene Winick
- Elizabeth Winick Rubinstein
- Ina Winick
- Christa Heschke
- Adam Muhlig

== Subsidiary rights ==
McIntosh & Otis handles the subsidiary rights for Louisiana University Press.

== Controversies ==
In 2004, the family of John Steinbeck sued McIntosh & Otis for Breach of Fiduciary Duty, Fraud and double-dipping commissions. In their attempt to fire the agency, a New York judge opined that they could not fire the agents based upon a power of attorney the family had signed in 1983. The judge then said that the power of attorney survived the death of the step-mother, Elaine Steinbeck and passed to her heirs by will. In a power grab, the agents failed to tell the court that Elaine had returned the power of attorney to John's only living son during her lifetime. Elaine's heirs were required to assign their power of attorney to the agents in order to inherit. The case was decided in a summary judgement motion without evidence production or witnesses. The situation remains contentious.

In June 2013, McIntosh & Otis filed a lawsuit against a literary agent formerly employed with them, Samuel Pinkus, in relation with another lawsuit that was filed against him by author Harper Lee, who claimed that Pinkus had duped her into handing over her copyright for her novel To Kill A Mockingbird. McIntosh & Otis claimed a percentage of commissions Pinkus earned from clients he took with him when he left the company in 2004 but eventually settled the lawsuit in September 2013.
