= Nevada Smith (1975 film) =

1975 TV film

- Genre: Western
- Written by: John Michael Hayes
- Directed by: Gordon Douglas
- Starring: Cliff Potts; Adam West; Lorne Greene; Warren Vanders; Roger Cudney
- Music by: Lamont Dozier
- Country of origin: United States
- Original language: English

Production
- Producers: John Michael Hayes; Martin Rackin
- Cinematography: Gabriel Torres
- Editor: John C. Horger
- Running time: 74 minutes
- Production companies: MGM Television; Rackin-Hayes Productions

Original release
- Network: NBC
- Release: May 3, 1975

Nevada Smith is a 1975 American Western television film starring Cliff Potts, Adam West and Lorne Greene, based on the 1966 feature film Nevada Smith.

This was a pilot for an unsold Western series. These characters were first introduced in the theatrical feature of the same title in 1966, and before that in 1964's The Carpetbaggers. Potts and Greene had the roles played earlier by Steve McQueen and Brian Keith (in the namesake movie) and by Alan Ladd and Leif Erickson in The Carpetbaggers.

== Plot ==
A half-breed gunslinger and a friend he hasn't seen in years join together to escort a shipment of explosives across Utah.

== Cast ==
- Cliff Potts as Nevada Smith
- Lorne Greene as Jonas Cord
- Adam West as Frank Hartlee
- Warren Vanders as Red Fickett
- Roger Cudney as Perkins

== See also ==
- List of American films of 1975
