= Once an Eagle (miniseries) =

1976 television miniseries by E.W. Swackhamer

Once An Eagle
- Promotional poster
- Directed by: Richard Michaels; E.W. Swackhamer
- Screenplay by: Peter S. Fischer
- Story by: Anton Myrer
- Produced by: Peter S. Fischer
- Starring: Sam Elliott; Cliff Potts; Darleen Carr; Amy Irving; Glenn Ford
- Cinematography: J.J. Jones
- Edited by: Howard Deane; John Elias; Chuck McClelland
- Music by: Dana Kaproff
- Production company: Universal Television
- Distributed by: MCA TV
- Release date: December 2, 1976 (United States)
- Running time: 540 minutes
- Country: United States
- Language: English

Once An Eagle is a 1976 nine-hour American television miniseries directed by Richard Michaels and E.W. Swackhamer. The picture was written by Peter S. Fischer and based on the 1968 Anton Myrer novel of the same name.

The first and last installments of the seven-part series were each two-hour broadcasts, while the interim episodes were 60 minutes.

The mini-series concerns the thirty year careers of two military men, from the outbreak of World War I to the aftermath of World War II.

== Plot summary ==
Sam Damon (Sam Elliott) is a virile and praiseworthy warrior.

Courtney Massengale (Cliff Potts) is the opposite—an impotent, self-aggrandizing conniver.

The story tracks their journey over 40 years, between the First and Second World Wars, as their lives, and the lives of those around them, change along with the world.

== Cast ==
- Sam Elliott as Sam Damon
- Cliff Potts as Courtney Massengale
- Darleen Carr as Tommy Caldwell
- Amy Irving as Emily Pawlfrey Massengale
- Glenn Ford as George Caldwell
- Ralph Bellamy as Ed Caldwell
- Dane Clark as Harry Sheppard
- Andrew Duggan as General McKelvey
- Lynda Day George as Marge Krisler
- Gary Grimes as Jack Devlin
- Clu Gulager as Alvin Merrick
- Robert Hogan as Ben Krisler
- Kim Hunter as Kitty Damon
- David Huddleston as Earl Preis
- Juliet Mills as Joyce
- Albert Salmi as Senator McConnadin
- John Saxon - Captain Townshend
- James Shigeta - Lin Tso-Han
- Barry Sullivan as General Bannerman
- Phyllis Thaxter as Alma Caldwell
- Forrest Tucker as Colonel Avery
- David Wayne as Colonel Terwilliger
- William Windom as General Pulleyne
- Anthony Zerbe as Dave Shifkin
- John Anderson as George Varney
- Andrew Robinson as Reb Rayburne
- Patti D'Arbanville as Michele
- Andrew Stevens as Donny Damon
- Melanie Griffith as Jinny Massengale
- Kip Niven as Ryetower
- Kent Smith as General Jacklyn

== Background ==
Once An Eagle was the second of four story subseries of the NBC anthology series Best Sellers; it was preceded by Captains and the Kings, and followed by Seventh Avenue and The Rhineman Exchange.

Anton Myrer's book, on which the series is based, is a military novel written in the United States. The novel is noted for its stark descriptions of men in combat and in its analysis of human and technical challenges and the moral dilemmas of command. It is one of only two novels on the US Army's recommended reading list for Officer Professional Development; the other is The Killer Angels by Michael Shaara. A coincidental element to both novels is that Sam Elliott had a starring role in the film adaptation of each one, playing a US Army general officer.

=== Filming locations ===
Some of the scenes of the film were filmed in Napa Valley, California.

=== DVD release ===
Timeless Media Group released the complete television series on a two-disc DVD set on August 31, 2010.

=== Origin of title ===
The title is derived from a poem in the Diwan of Nasir Khusraw, a retelling of the "The Eagle Wounded by an Arrow" (Fable No. 276 in the Perry Index of Aesop's Fables):

And so in the Libyan fable it is told,

That once an eagle, stricken with a dart,

Said, when he saw the fashion of the shaft,

"With our own feathers, not by others' hands,

Are we now stricken".

== Awards ==
Nominations

- Emmy Awards: Emmy; Outstanding Cinematography in Entertainment Programming for a Series, J.J. Jones; for part I; 1977.
- Golden Globes: Golden Globe; Best Supporting Actress - Television, Darleen Carr; 1977.
