= Nell Blaine =

American landscape painter (1922–1996)

- Born: Nell Blair Walden Blaine; July 11, 1922; Richmond, Virginia, U.S.
- Died: November 14, 1996 (aged 74); New York, New York, U.S.
- Known for: Painting
- Spouse: Bob Bass (m. 1943–1949)
- Awards: Women's Caucus for Art Lifetime Achievement Award

Nell Blair Walden Blaine (July 10, 1922 – November 14, 1996) was an American landscape painter, expressionist, and watercolorist. From Richmond, Virginia, she had most of her career based in New York City and Gloucester, Massachusetts.

== Early life and education ==
Nell Blaine was born on July 10, 1922, in Richmond, Virginia, to Harry Wellington Blaine and his second wife Eudora Catherine Garrison. She was cross-eyed and sickly as a child. When she was two, her parents realized that she was extremely nearsighted and had her fitted with glasses. She later recalled her excitement over suddenly being able to see the world around her as she rushed around exclaiming "water, tree, and house."

After Nell was born, her father continued to mourn his first wife, who had died in childbirth. He expressed his grief as anger toward his daughter, in the form of verbal and often physical abuse. His second wife, Eudora, had taught grade-school for ten years before Nell's birth. When Nell's health was too fragile for her to attend school, Eudora Blaine tutored the girl at home for a year. At the age of five, Nell told her mother she wanted to make art.

Blaine's father lost his job as a lumber inspector, and had to settle for lesser pay during the Great Depression. The Blaine grandfather moved in with the family in its already crowded space. Blaine loved her grandfather and recalled that he loved to dance, could crack jokes, and told brilliant stories. She was teased at school because of her crossed eyes, and fought back physically. She was described as pale and undernourished; her school placed her in a special class and on a strict diet. Because of her condition, she had special nap times and more outdoor activities than the average child. Blaine's crossed eyes were corrected after she visited her Aunt Nellie Sue and family in Baltimore. Blaine had several operations at Johns Hopkins Hospital, and had to wear bandages for months. But at thirteen, she had improved vision and returned to school and more acceptance from peers.

Blaine's drawing skills improved greatly because of the surgery. Her cousin Ruth bought her her first set of watercolor paints, and Nell was intrigued by its movement on paper. But during her teenage years, her father was repeatedly ill. He suffered from cardiac asthma and a series of heart attacks that left him disabled and on oxygen for long periods. Nell's only escape came with her summer trips to Nellie Sue's house in Baltimore. She was visiting them when her father died.

Flowers were Blaine's happiest enduring link with her childhood in Richmond, Virginia. She recalled,

"We lived in a small, plain house that my father built himself in a middle-class neighborhood, and the upper half was rented out so our space was very cramped. In the yard my mother, my father, and I each had a garden. My mother's taste inclined to roses and spring flowers, and I had ordinary things like Zinnias and bluets, but the glory of our yard was my father's dahlias. They bloomed in wonderful, brilliant colors, and the blossoms were as large as dinner plates. I remember the care with which he sorted the bulbs and stored them in the basement over the winter."

Blaine studied at the Richmond School of Art (now VCU) with Theresa Pollak. In 1942, she moved to New York City to study painting under Hans Hofmann. She was recommended to him by printmaker Worden Day. Through her yearlong training at the Hans Hofmann School, she adopted a non-painterly style. By 1943, she joined the American Abstract Artists group as its youngest member. Blaine studied etching and engraving with Stanley William Hayter at Atelier 17 starting in 1945.

== Early career ==
Blaine's work had begun as "tightly realist" but transformed to an abstract style, which was inspired by artists such as Piet Mondrian, Fernand Leger, and Jean Helion. Blaine's association with the American Abstract Artists group led to her receiving her first solo exhibition, held at Greenwich Village's Jane Street Gallery, of which she was a founding member. It was the earliest known artists' cooperative in New York. In these early years with the Jane Street Group, Blaine prescribed to an abstract style, later explaining, "[By 1944], I'm developing so fast in my tastes and I become more abstract all the time--to the point of great purification....", and about fellow Jane Street Group members, "[we] were very dogmatic about our program. Now, as I look back on it, I'm a little ashamed. But we were so excited we really thought that was the gospel, you know. When you're young you are very sure of yourself." Blaine and many other young artists used the space to display and sell their works, raising funds from collectors and donors in New York and making a name for themselves through shared and solo exhibitions. At this time, Blaine was working alongside Ida Fischer, Judith Rothschild, and other Abstract Expressionist artists under 25 years of age.

Blaine briefly lived and worked in Paris around 1950 with Larry Rivers, traveling across Europe and exhibiting with the American Abstract Artists group in France, Denmark, and Italy. This experience inspired her to try traditional 19th-century European painting. She showed at the Tibor de Nagy Gallery starting in 1953.

During the mid-1950s, she refined her increasingly painterly and colorful style. She worked directly from nature, or still life, particularly focusing on the forms and hues of flowers. Also during this time, Blaine was prominent among a prestigious circle of New York artists and poets which included John Ashbery, Frank O'Hara, Willem de Kooning, Kenneth Koch, Lee Krasner, Jane Freilicher, Leland Bell, Louisa Matthiasdottir, Robert De Niro Sr., and Rudy Burckhardt. In 1955, she designed the original logo of column heads and layout for the weekly New York newspaper The Village Voice.

In 1959, Blaine spent several months traveling and painting in Greece before contracting bulbospinal, or paralytic, polio while visiting Mykonos Island. After eight months in a New York hospital, she was told she would never paint again. Though she used a wheelchair the rest of her life, by 1960 intensive physical therapy had rehabilitated the use of her hands. From then on, she would use her left hand to paint with oils, and her right hand to sketch and work on watercolors.

== Work ==
Blaine resisted classifying her work, which explored color and the interplay of light and shade. The subject matter was primarily landscapes of the Hudson River made from her apartment window, vases of flowers, still lifes, home interiors, or her garden at Gloucester, Massachusetts. She once said, "The artist needs a permissive atmosphere. I am not involved in impressionism, and I have turned from my former total abstract presentation. Mine are action paintings. I want to be surprised by what I am doing. An artist must be his own leader, no matter what direction he takes."

By the 1950s, Blaine's work had reached considerable acclaim in New York City. Art critic Clement Greenberg spoke highly of her work, describing Blaine's Great White Creature as “best in the show” at the annual exhibition of the American Abstract Artists in 1945. Peggy Guggenheim selected one of her pieces for the second landmark exhibition of women artists, Art of This Century: The Women, held at Art of This Century in 1945, on Greenberg's recommendation. The abstract artist Ad Reinhardt credited her work in 1947. As Blaine's practice continued, she began to experiment more with Abstract Expressionism, watercolor as a medium, and the repeating motif of a window view from an interior. By 1959, despite her depleted health, Blaine was frequently traveling, painting landscape scenes in the Caribbean, Europe, New England, and more. At this point, she had largely moved past her Abstract Expressionist phase, and into a more Modernist style. By the mid 1970s, she had settled in Gloucester, Massachusetts.

From the start she saw painting as a means of celebrating life and conceived her role to be that of an orchestrator of forms and colors. Blaine would convey this sense of celebration in her early abstractions inspired by jazz, recent unfurling petals of dahlias, or cushiony zinnias that testify to the abundant small miracles of the commonplace. Blaine's work often expresses a sense of isolation. While Gloucester was obviously much more secluded than New York, the theme is visible in her early work as well. Much of her reclusive, personal style can be attributed to the intimate relationship between artist and nature, to which she was deeply in tune when living in rural Massachusetts. Blaine was known to paint in seclusion, often late at night when she could have the quiet setting she preferred.

== Personal life ==
In 1943, Blaine married Bob Bass, a French horn player who introduced her to good friends in painters Larry Rivers and Jane Freilicher. Blaine and Bass divorced in 1949. She lived for many years in a large apartment and studio in the building at 210 Riverside Drive with her life partner, artist Carolyn Harris. She also maintained a summer home in Gloucester. An extensive obituary of Ms. Blaine appeared in the New York Times on November 15, 1996.

== Recognition ==
Blaine's works are included in the permanent collections of the Metropolitan Museum of Art, Whitney Museum of American Art, The Brooklyn Museum, National Academy of Design, Hirshhorn Museum and Sculpture Garden, National Museum of Women in the Arts, Rose Art Museum, Virginia Museum of Fine Arts, Muscarelle Museum of Art, and the Museum of Contemporary Art in Los Angeles.

The native Virginian artist received Visual Arts Fellowships from the Virginia Museum of Fine Arts in 1943 and 1946, which supported her training in New York with Hofmann and Hayter, respectively. Life magazine featured Blaine as one of five young American "women artists in ascendance" in their May 13, 1957, issue.

In 1973, the Virginia Museum of Fine Arts honored Blaine with a solo exhibition that surveyed more than a decade of her work. In 1980, Blaine was elected into the National Academy of Design as an associate member, and became a full member in 1982. Her papers are held at Harvard University. In 1986, Blaine received the Lifetime Achievement Award from the Women's Caucus for Art. In 1996, the year of her death, Blaine received the Leslie Cheek Award for Outstanding Presentation in the Arts from William and Mary concurrent with a retrospective of her work at the Muscarelle Museum of Art.

== Exhibitions ==
2026

Nell Blaine: Gloucester Harbor and Other Works, an exhibition of paintings and watercolors.- Tibor de Nagy Gallery.

2023

Heroines of the Abstract Expressionist Era: From The New York School to The Hamptons Featuring various artists, including Nell Blaine. National Association of Women Artists, Inc.

2019

- Nell Blaine - selected works.

On view at MoMa

- Kasmin Gallery: “Painters of the east End”, featuring selected works by Nell Blaine.

2016

- Will You Be My Valentine?, Caldwell Gallery Hudson, Hudson
- Nell Blaine: Selected Works, Tibor de Nagy, New York

2012

- Nell Blaine: A Glowing Order: Printings and Watercolors at Tibor de Nagy Gallery, New York, NY

2007

- Nell Blaine: Image and Abstraction, Paintings and Drawings 1944-1959 at Tibor de Nagy Gallery, New York, NY

2004

- Nell Blaine: Selected Works at Tibor de Nagy Gallery, New York, NY

2003

- Nell Blaine: Artist in the World: Work from the 1950s at Tibor de Nagy Gallery, New York, NY
- The Jane Street Gallery: Celebrating New York's First Artist Cooperative at Tibor de Nagy Gallery, New York, NY
- Nell Blaine: Abstract Paintings and Works on Paper at Valerie Carberry Gallery, Chicago, IL
- Nell Blaine/ Theresa Pollak at Reynolds Gallery, Richmond, VA

2001

- Nell Blaine: Sensations of Nature at Cape Ann Historical Museum, Gloucester, MA, and Marsh Art Gallery, Richmond, VA
- Nell Blaine: The Abstract Work at Tibor de Nagy Gallery, New York, NY

1998

- Shattering the Southern Stereotype: Jack Beal, Nell Blaine, Dorothy Gillespie, Sally Mann, Cy Twombly at Longwood Center for the Visual Arts, Farmville, VA

1996

- Nell Blaine at Muscarelle Museum of Art at William & Mary, Williamsburg, VA

1987

- Nell Blaine at Fischbach Gallery, New York, NY

1985

- Nell Blaine: Paintings, Drawings, and Etchings at Reynolds/Minor Gallery, Richmond, VA

1973

- Nell Blaine at Virginia Museum of Fine Arts, Richmond, VA

1960

- Nell Blaine: Paintings of Greece at Poindexter Gallery, New York, NY

1948

- Nell Blaine at Jane Street Gallery, New York, NY

1945

- The Women at Art of This Century, New York, NY

== Sources ==
- Martica Sawin, ed. (1998). Nell Blaine: her art and life. Hudson Hills. ISBN 978-1-55595-113-9.
- Smith, Roberta. Obituary: "Nell Blaine, 74, Painter Who Blended Styles," The New York Times, 14 Nov. 1996. Web. 06 Apr. 2017.
