= Tibor de Nagy Gallery =

Art gallery in New York City

Coordinates: 40°45′45.41″N 73°58′27.94″W

The Tibor de Nagy Gallery is an art gallery located on Rivington Street on the Lower East Side of Manhattan.

== History ==
Tibor de Nagy Gallery is among the earliest modern art galleries in New York City. The gallery was founded by Tibor de Nagy (1908–1993) and John Bernard Myers in 1950 and was located in the East 50s. It established emerging artists including Carl Andre, Helen Frankenthaler, Jane Wilson, Red Grooms, Larry Rivers, Nell Blaine, Jane Freilicher, and Fairfield Porter, among others. The gallery became a salon for artists and poets and exhibited collaborations between them. The gallery published early volumes of poetry by New York School poets John Ashbery, Kenneth Koch, and Frank O’Hara. From 1993 to 2017 the gallery was co-owned and directed by Andrew Arnot and Eric Brown. In early 2017, Brown departed the gallery, and that same year, after 67 years in midtown Manhattan, Arnot relocated the gallery to the Lower East Side.

The gallery specializes in paintings and works on paper. It represents a group of artists whose works are either painterly representational or abstract. It also works with a number of estates of such figures as Joe Brainard, Rudy Burckhardt, Donald Evans, and Jess.

The gallery also has collaborative publications under the Tibor de Nagy Editions imprint. One of the books published under this imprint is titled, Postcards to Donald Evans, by Takashi Hiraide and published in 2003.
