= Arthur Lawrence Hellyer Jr. =

American journalist

Arthur Lawrence "Art" Hellyer Jr. (August 7, 1923 – September 5, 2018) was an American radio and television broadcaster whose professional career spanned the years 1947–2012 and included local and national network radio programs as a disc jockey, radio and television news reporter and anchor, sports reporter, game show television host, and live and recorded television and radio commercials.

Chuck Schaden, Chicago radio history buff and host of Golden Age of Radio programs on WBBM-AM and WNIB-FM 97.1 wrote that "Art Hellyer was the king of Chicago radio", and Hellyer "became the originator and perhaps the foremost exponent of zany, off-the-wall comedy on the air." During his career Hellyer's shows achieved #1 in ratings (numbers of listeners) on three different Chicago radio stations during his program time slots. Vicki Quade, journalist and playwright, called Hellyer "a legend in radio."

Hellyer succeeded with innovative on-air antics and creativity that were not typical yet on radio in the 1950s including wisecracks, offbeat and topical humor, ad-libbed interplay with recorded sound bites including comedy album soundtracks thrown at him by his studio engineer, playing up to four recorded commercials simultaneously to reduce commercial time, playing Christmas music in July, humorously faking live interviews and commercial products, reporting time one hour off or the wrong music performers on April Fools' Days, betting a competitor deejay on another radio station he could play the same songs simultaneously which he won by actually streaming on air the competitor's broadcast live on his station, and taking creative liberties with commercial announcements that sometimes led to friction with management. Later in his career Hellyer gained a national radio audience hosting on the Satellite Music Network. In 2008 Hellyer self-published a book of autobiographical essays entitled "The Hellyer Say."

== Personal life ==
Hellyer was born August 7, 1923, in Chicago, Illinois. He enlisted in the U.S. Army Air Corps December 12, 1942 and served until being honorably discharged February 18, 1946. Hellyer earned his private pilot's license at Chanute Field, Illinois, and then completed a U.S. Armed Services certificate program in Meteorology at Baer Field, Indiana, later serving in the weather corps of the United States Army Air Corps (USAAC) stateside supporting pilot training flights during World War II. In 1947 he married Elaine Miller; they had five children. Hellyer's wife, Elaine, died in 1998.

Hellyer died in Naperville, Illinois, at the age of 95 on September 5, 2018.

== Radio career ==
Following his military service, Hellyer enrolled in broadcasting classes in March 1946, at the Radio Institute of Chicago. He studied with experienced broadcasters and radio actors including Paul Barnes, Bob Cunningham and Ted Liss, and worked on studio projects with fellow students including future TV actor, Tom Bosley.

Hellyer's professional broadcasting career began on New Year's Day 1947 at WKNA-AM, Charleston, West Virginia, hosting the first music program on this newly licensed radio station's initial day of broadcasting. His early career (between 1947 and 1950) included hosting radio programs at WOWO-AM Fort Wayne, Indiana; WMRO-AM Aurora, Illinois; and WISN-AM, WMAW-AM and WMIL-AM, Milwaukee, Wisconsin, where he also reported news throughout the night of the Truman-Dewey election in 1948. In Milwaukee he often broadcast live from "remote" local music venues, emceeing stage and ballroom performances with Patti Page, Liberace, Ken Griffin, Frankie Laine and other entertainers.

Hellyer's break into a major market was in May 1950, when his daily postcards mailed to WCFL-AM Chicago's program director asking to "rescue" him from Milwaukee resulted in an unorthodox on-air live audition for 50,000 watt WCFL while broadcasting his show on air on WMIL-AM in Milwaukee. WCFL hired Hellyer, and by 1952 Hellyer was given the drive-time 6am – 10am radio slot where he was promoted as the "Morning Madcap." During this time Hellyer also freelanced with radio shows broadcasting on as many as seven different radio stations the same week, emceeing celebrity events, and generally advancing his career with radio and television commercial work as the regular voice of national sponsors. This included announcing live in-studio commercials on the CBS network show "What's My Line" in New York.

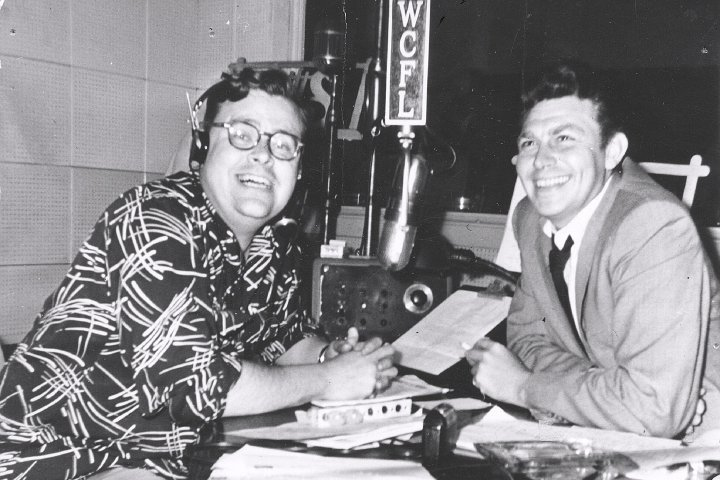
Hellyer interviewing Andy Griffith in 1953 on WCFL-AM in Chicago

=== Radio highlights chronology ===
- 1947 - 1950 WKNA Charleston, West Virginia; WOWO Fort Wayne, Indiana; WMRO Aurora, Illinois; WMAW Milwaukee, Wisconsin; WISN (CBS) Milwaukee, Wisconsin; WMIL Milwaukee, Wisconsin
- 1950–1957 WCFL-AM Chicago including "Morning Madcap" drive time disc jockey 1952–1957.
- 1951–1955 WGN-AM and WCFL-AM Chicago – Host of Chicago radio's "The Marriage License Show" from Cook County (IL) Clerk, Richard J. Daley's office. Hellyer then became the radio and TV announcer for Mayor Richard J. Daley's political ads in his campaigns for mayor of Chicago in the elections of 1955 and 1959.
- 1951–1956 WMAQ-AM (NBC) Chicago – Weekend host of "Downtown with Hellyer" show.
- 1953–1955 WCFL-AM Chicago – Host of the "Dugout Show," a live in-stadium pre-game interview show of Major League baseball players, coaches, managers and executives prior to all Chicago White Sox major league home baseball games at Comiskey Park, Chicago, Illinois. Worked with Baseball "Hall of Fame" announcer, Bob Elson.
- 1957–1959 WAIT-AM Chicago – Morning "drive time" show host
- 1959–1961 and 1963–1979 ABC Television and Radio Chicago and Network announcer providing show introductions to radio and television shows including "Paul Harvey News" and "Alex Dreier News." Hosted the radio shows of Paul Harvey and Alex Dreier on the air during their some of their absences.
- 1961–1963 WBBM-AM (CBS) Chicago - Announcer and radio host of live entertainment show and also live news reporting. From 1961 to 1962 hosted live nightly WBBM-AM "Supper Club" broadcast featuring in-studio music and comedy acts, interviews and skits.
- 1964–1967 WOPA-AM Oak Park, Illinois, host of daily radio show.
- 1967–1969 WLS-FM (ABC) Chicago, Illinois - Hosted the "Art Hellyer Morning Show" during drive time.
- 1983–1985 WJJD-AM Chicago, Illinois - Radio host playing music of the "Big Band" era and the 1950s.
- 1985–1988 Daily program host on national Satellite Music Network's "Stardust Division" broadcasting into 19 metropolitan areas across the U.S. plus Bermuda and the Virgin Islands.
- 1988–2002 WJOL-AM and WJOL.com, Joliet, Illinois – Weekend radio host featuring music from the 1930s – 1960s, talk, and remote broadcasts at sponsor sites.
- 2011–2012 Host of weekly "Art Hellyer Show" on "Party 93.4" Worldwide Internet network and network of upstate New York FM stations.

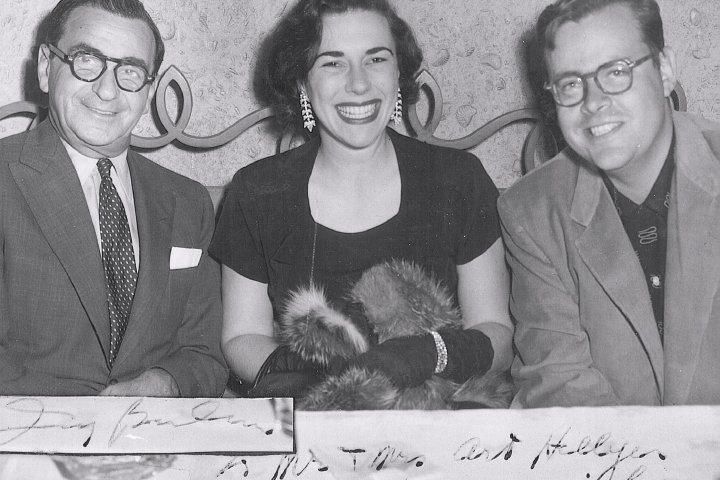
Art and Elaine Hellyer dining with Irving Berlin in 1956

== Television career ==
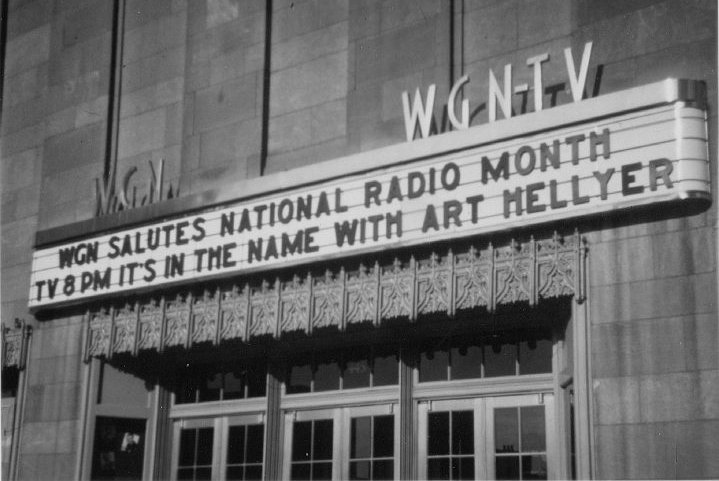
"It's In the Name" game show 1958 on WGN-TV Chicago hosted by Mr. Hellyer

Hellyer hosted a live show on WENR-TV (later WLS-TV) in 1950 called "Rate Your Mate", during which he and another performer, Carmelita Pope, entertained with live improvised skits based on audience suggestions. In 1958 he hosted TV game show "It's in the Name" on WGN-TV in Chicago.

He worked as an ABC-TV staff network announcer between 1959 and 1979, providing voice-over live introductions to "Monday Night Football", "Monday Night Baseball", "Wide World of Sports,""Pabst Blue Ribbon Beer Friday Night Fights," and the Summer and Winter Olympics programming on ABC for the 1964, 1968 and 1972 Summer and Winter Olympics.

Provided on-air ABC-TV news anchoring on Chicago's WBKB (now WLS-TV) coverage while working 24 hours a day November 22–24, 1963 following President John F. Kennedy's assassination. His role as TV News reporter for WBKB-TV (ABC) Chicago included on-the-street reporting, and he was the late night station "sign-off" news anchor between 1964 and 1966 on WBKB-TV (now WLS-TV) in Chicago.

== Teaching career ==
Between 1970 and 1986, Hellyer also worked as a Radio broadcasting instructor at Columbia College in Chicago, and at University of St. Francis, Joliet, IL from 1974 to 1986.

== Honors ==
- 1956 RCA Victor Disc Jockey of the Year – award presented live on Perry Como's NBC-TV network television show
- 1958 New York Advertising Club's Winners for 1958 – Television: Arthur Godfrey (Bufferin), Radio: Art Hellyer (Simmons Mattress)
- 1960 Voice actor on the "Chicago Radio Commercial of the Year" awarded by the Chicago Copywriters Advertising Club (Perk Pet Food)
