= Martica Sawin =

Author and art critic

Martica Sawin was an American author and art critic. She is the author of Surrealism in Exile and the Beginning of the New York School (MIT Press, Cambridge, Massachusetts, 1995) and surveys on artists such as Roberto Matta. Sawin was chairman of the art history department at the Parsons School of Design in New York from 1967 to 1985.
