= Once an Eagle =

Novel by Anton Myrer

- Cover to HarperTorch paperback edition (2001)
- Author: Anton Myrer
- Language: English
- Genre: War novel
- Publisher: Holt, Rinehart, and Winston
- Publication date: 1968
- Publication place: United States
- Media type: Print (Hardback & Paperback)
- Pages: 1312
- ISBN: 0-06-103086-4

Once an Eagle is a 1968 war novel by American author Anton Myrer. The novel takes place between the 1910s and 1960s, and covers many of the United States' military involvements during that period. Once an Eagle tells the story of Sam Damon, career Army officer, from his initial enlistment as a private to his rise to general officer rank. Damon is an honorable soldier who rises in rank by success in field command, and cares for the welfare of his troops. His career is contrasted with that of another soldier, Courtney Massengale, who has no honor, no concern for his troops, and rises in rank through staff positions by cunning and political connections. As the two rise in the ranks together, they frequently clash in their views.

Once an Eagle is popular among members of the United States military. The book was a New York Times bestseller. The book appears on the Commandant's required reading list for all Staff Sergeants and Gunnery Sergeants in the United States Marine Corps.

A television miniseries based on the book was aired on NBC in 1976, with actor Sam Elliott portraying Sam Damon.

== Plot ==
=== Book 1: Orchard ===
This section covers the young Sam Damon's formative years in small town in Nebraska, during which he earns his nickname "The Night Clerk." After being put on a wait list to attend West Point, Sam decides to enlist in the Army. This section contains Damon's experiences in basic training and deployment south of the border during the Mexican expedition, though he sees no combat.

=== Book 2: Wheat ===
Damon's service takes off in World War I, including his battlefield commission by his commanding officer, General Caldwell, and actions, lead to his award of the Medal of Honor. Sam rises to the rank of Major before the war ends, and falls in love with and marries General Caldwell's daughter, Tommy, who swore she would never marry a service member knowing the hard life they live. He meets Major Courtney Massengale by chance at a cafe. Massengale has his sights set on achieving great success through his military service and with assistance from his uncle, a Senator. Damon and Tommy start their Army career together at Fort Hardee, a desolate fort that leaves Sam less than thrilled and that Tommy despises. Sam is demoted back to a 1st Lieutenant upon returning from the war and learns the hard way about the favoritism that plagues the Army (especially for those that graduated from West Point). Damon continues to build a reputation of always looking out for his soldiers, even if that means harming his own career progression in the political military climate.

=== Book 3: Chaparral ===
This section covers the time between the two world wars, including Sam's interactions with Massengale, who we learn cares little to none about the service members below him and only about his career, his best friend and confidante Ben Krisler, and the birth of the Damons' children, Donny and Peg, as the family move from one military outpost to another, including a stint in the Philippines. Tommy makes Sam promise he will not push Donny to join the service.

=== Book 4: Liana ===
This section covers World War II and Damon's promotion to division commander. Sam learns that his son has died while in Europe, when his parachute failed to open. Donny left college to enlist, telling his father that he needed to fight evil in the world. Tommy struggles with the separation and fear her son will be harmed. Damon's tour culminates in the disastrous Operation Palladium commanded by Corps Commander General Massengale, who does not send reinforcements to Damon's position despite promising to. He instead sends the reinforcements to a location already victorious, so he can be seen riding in with glory. This interlude features the death of Krisler during Palladium, as Damon is severely wounded but is able to preserve victory against all odds.

=== Book 5: Delta ===
The final book finds Sam Damon once again in Southeast Asia, this time as an adviser to an escalating conflict in Khotiane, an allegorical name for Vietnam. He finds himself opposing General Massengale's desire to increase American participation in the conflict, which Damon views as calamitous.

== Characters ==
- Sam Damon (Protagonist. Honorable, forthright officer dedicated to the Army and his soldiers)
- Courtney Massengale (Antagonist. Conniver and malefactor, using family political connections to move up the ranks)
- Tommy Caldwell Damon (Sam Damon's Wife, Daughter of General George Caldwell)
- General George Caldwell (Sam Damon's Commanding Officer during World War I, Father of Tommy Caldwell Damon)
- Jack Devlin (Sam's best friend during World War I)
- Ben Krisler (Sam's best friend during the interwar years and World War II)
- Donny Damon (Sam and Tommy's son)
- Emily Massengale (Courtney's wife)

Though seldom noted, Sam Damon's character is partly based on the real life Major General William C. Chase (1895 to 1986). General Chase's career is described in Front Line General, The Commands of William C. Chase (1975).

== Literary significance ==
General H. Norman Schwarzkopf described Once an Eagle as "[a] classic novel of war and warriors. Sam Damon doesn't preach, he lives his values and they are universal, not only military."

In 1997 the United States Army War College Foundation published an edition with a foreword by General John William Vessey, Jr. which read "It has been over thirty years since Anton Myrer, a former Marine enlisted man, began the exhaustive and painstaking research that produced this classic novel of soldiers and soldiering. Once an Eagle ranks with Red Badge of Courage and All Quiet on the Western Front as time tested epics of war and warriors. The spirit, the heart and, yes, the soul of the officer corps is captured, as are the intangible ambiance and nuances that make up the life of the American soldier and his family. It is for these reasons and more that the Army War College Foundation has undertaken to republish Anton Myrer’s masterpiece."

General Charles C. Krulak, the commandant of the US Marine Corps, wrote "Once an Eagle has more to teach about leadership – whether it is in the boardroom or on the battlefield – than a score of modern-day management texts. It is a primer that lays out, through the lives of its two main characters, lessons on how and how not to lead."

Maj. Gen. Robert H. Scales, the commandant of the US Army War College in 1997 wrote on the book's fly-leaf "Once an Eagle has been the literary moral compass for me and my family of soldiers for more than two generations. Its ethical message is as fresh and relevant today as it was when Anton Myrer wrote it during the war in Vietnam." In an interview with Foreign Policy in 2013 however, Scales claimed that the novel's effects damaged the Army's officer corps:

"Today’s generation has spent a great deal of time in the field and very little in the classroom or on the staff. Many are unduly contemptuous about serving in the purgatory of the Washington bureaucracy and treat staff time as an unwelcome interlude between assignments in the field. Perhaps the pull of the Sam track has made too many commanders out of officers whose place is on a staff, and too few brilliant staff officers who choose to leave right in the midst of their most productive years because they failed to make the cut for the next command."

The book has also been on the Army Chief of Staff's, Air Force Chief of Staff's, and the Marine Corps Commandant's recommended reading list for professional development, and is currently on the U.S. Military Academy at West Point recommended reading as well.

== Adaptations ==
In 1976, NBC created a nine-hour American television miniseries, likewise titled Once An Eagle, based on the book and directed by Richard Michaels and E.W. Swackhamer. It aired as part of NBC's Best Sellers anthology series. The miniseries was written by Peter S. Fischer and starred Sam Elliott as Damon, with Cliff Potts portraying Courtney Massengale. The first and last installments of the seven-part series broadcast two hours each, while the interim episodes each broadcast for 60 minutes. The mini-series concerns the thirty year careers of two military men, from the outbreak of World War I to the aftermath of World War II.
