= Cliff Potts =

American television and film actor (born 1942)

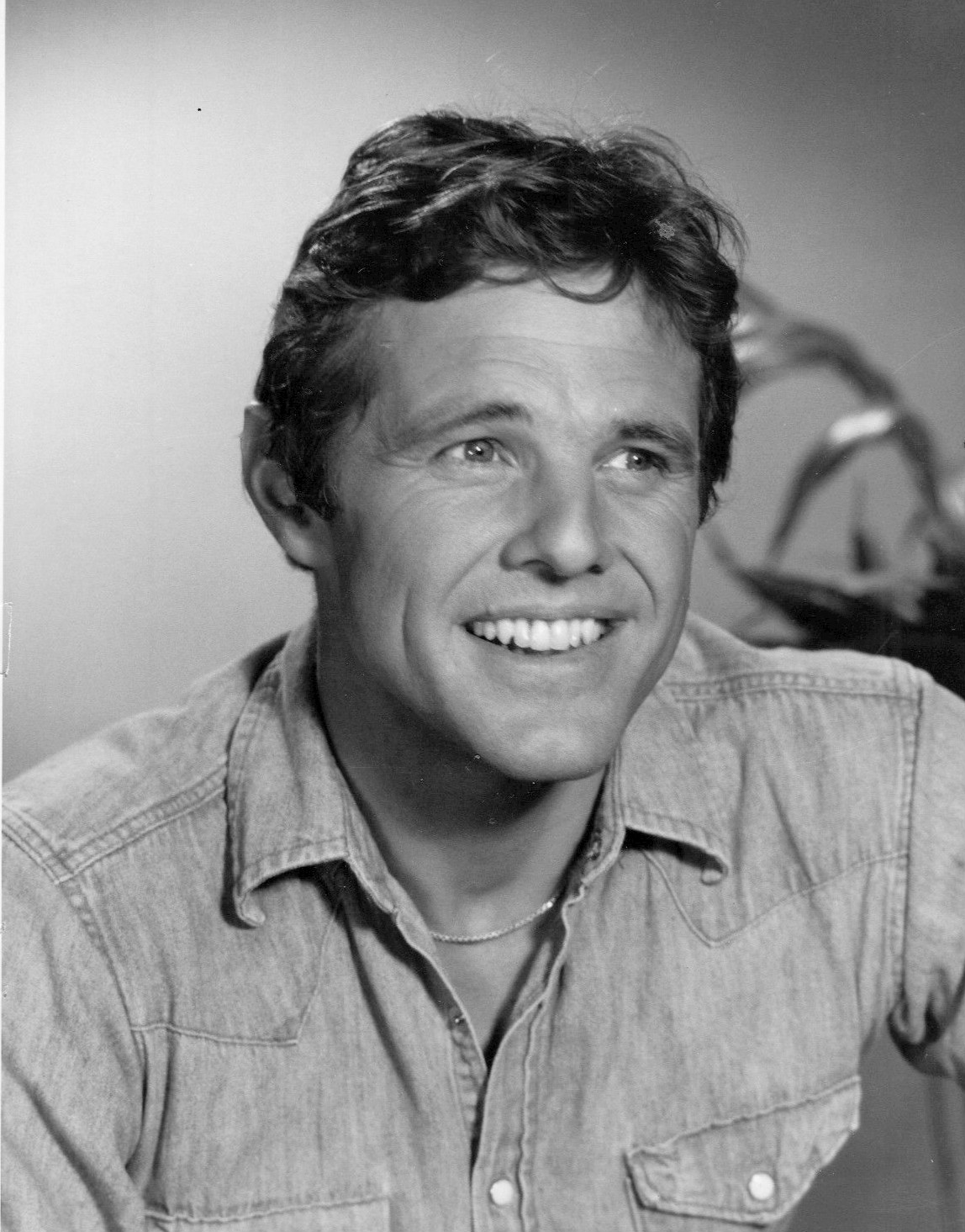
- Potts in 1977
- Born: January 5, 1942 (age 83)
- Occupation: Actor

Cliff Potts (born January 5, 1942) is an American television and film actor, known for his co-starring role in the 1972 science fiction film, Silent Running starring Bruce Dern.

Potts starred as Sergeant Eugene Allard in For Love and Honor (1983) on NBC. He also was a regular supporting player during the first season of The Name of the Game, a revolving 90-minute 1968 series about a publishing empire that featured Tony Franciosa, Gene Barry, and Robert Stack. He also appeared in starring roles in the 1976-1977 TV miniseries Once an Eagle and the 1977 TV series, Big Hawaii in which he played Mitch Fears, the rebellious son of rich landowner Barret Fears (John Dehner). He also played the title role in the 1975 TV remake of the Steve McQueen film Nevada Smith, and portrayed John Brooke in the 1978 film of Little Women. He had the same role in the NBC-TV program Little Women (1979)..

In addition, Potts has appeared in many starring and supporting roles in television series, and his film credits include roles in A Man Called Gannon (1968), Sometimes a Great Notion (1970), Snow Job (1972), The Groundstar Conspiracy (1972), Cry for Me, Billy (1972), Hangup (1974), Trapped Beneath the Sea (1974), Sahara (1983), and Star Trek: The Next Generation (1991). He also appeared in the Emmy-nominated television movie A Case of Rape, playing a man who, not once but twice, rapes a young housewife (played by Elizabeth Montgomery) and later hires a skilled defense attorney who gets him off the hook for his crime.

After a 14-year absence from acting, he returned to the screen in the 2013 Hallmark Channel television film, Our Wild Hearts.
