= Robert H. Scales =

United States Army general (1944–2024)

Robert H. Scales Jr.
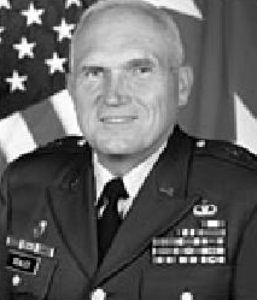
- Born: August 5, 1944; Gainesville, Florida, U.S.
- Died: January 12, 2024 (aged 79); Washington, DC, U.S.
- Relatives: Robert Scales, Sr. (father), 2 daughters
- Military career
- Allegiance: United States
- Branch: United States Army
- Service years: 1966–2000
- Rank: Major General
- Nickname: "Bob"
- Commands: United States Army War College
- Conflicts: Vietnam War
- Awards: Army Distinguished Service Medal; Silver Star; Legion of Merit (5); Bronze Star Medal
- Other work: Certain Victory (1994); Scales on War (2016)

Robert Hinds Scales Jr. (August 5, 1944 – January 12, 2024) was a United States Army Major General and former Commandant of the United States Army War College. He is widely known for his work as a military analyst, news commentator, and author.

== Early life and education ==
Scales was born in Gainesville, Florida, in 1944, but then "scurried all over the world".

His father, Robert Scales Sr., was a career U.S. Army officer who graduated Officer Candidate School at Fort Belvoir, Virginia, completed the Engineer Officer Basic Course and worked with amphibious vehicles in Florida, where his parents met, before piloting amphibious landing craft in the Pacific campaign of World War II.

== Career ==
=== 1960s ===
After graduating from West Point in 1966, he was commissioned as a field artillery officer and sent to West Germany, instead of South Vietnam. After two years in Europe, he was posted to Vietnam, but it was another year before he was in combat. After an artillery commander was killed, Scales was his replacement prior to the Battle of Hamburger Hill. He was awarded the Silver Star for his actions on June 14, 1969, when nearly a hundred North Vietnamese soldiers overran his base in a predawn assault. Despite explosions all around him, he rotated among his gun crews, firing at the enemy, helping his men, and radioing instructions to helicopter gunships.

=== 1970s ===
In the early 1970s, Scales earned a Master's degree and Ph.D. in history from Duke University. His 1976 doctoral thesis was entitled Artillery in small wars: the evolution of British artillery doctrine, 1860–1914.

=== 1980s ===
Beginning in 1982, Scales was a field artillery battalion commander in South Korea.

From 1986 to 1988, Scales served as deputy chief of staff for the U.S. Army V Corps in Frankfurt, West Germany.

=== 1990s ===
In 1990, Scales commanded the U.S. Army Field Artillery School at Fort Sill, Oklahoma.

Scales was named director of the Desert Storm Special Study Group in 1991, and authored the book, Certain Victory, the U.S. Army's official account of the first Persian Gulf War. The book was published in 1994, the first of seven he has written.

In 1995 he became deputy chief of staff for the Army Training and Doctrine Command, developing a blueprint for designing future military forces.

The high point of his career was his appointment as commandant of the U.S. Army War College in 1997.

=== 2000s ===
Scales retired in November 2000 after 34 years of service. He continued to write and accept speaking engagements after leaving active duty and was named Fleet Admiral Chester W. Nimitz Lecturer at the University of California, Berkeley, in 2004. and serves as a commentator for both NPR and Fox News. His writing has appeared in Time Magazine.

In 2002, Scales was named President of Walden University, a position he held until 2003.

=== 2010s ===
In an interview with Lou Dobbs Tonight at Fox News on 10 March 2015, speaking about the War in Donbas, General Scales said, "The only way the United States can have any effect in this region and turn the tide is to start killing Russians — killing so many Russians that even Putin's media can't hide the fact that Russians are returning to the motherland in body bags". The Moscow Times wrote that the context of his statement suggested that his words were rhetoric, rather than a call to arms.

On 12 March 2015, Investigative Committee of Russia launched a criminal case, describing Scales' words as a call to the U.S. political and military leadership and the American citizens to "conduct military operations on the Ukrainian territory and to kill Russian citizens, as well as Russian-speaking people". The case was launched under the article of Russia's Criminal Code that prohibits "public calls to unleash an aggressive warfare, made with the use of media outlets". If arrested and convicted by a Russian court, Scales could have theoretically faced up to five years in prison.

== Personal life ==
Scales is survived by his two daughters, who both joined the U.S. Army. He purchased his first civilian home in 2002 at age 58. His father retired from the U.S. Army as a colonel.

== Awards and decorations ==

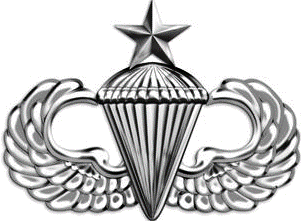

1st Row	Distinguished Service Medal	Silver Star	Legion of Merit (with 4 oak leaf clusters)
2nd Row	Bronze Star Medal	Meritorious Service Medal (with 4 oak leaf clusters)	Air Medal
3rd Row	Army Commendation Medal (with 4 oak leaf clusters)	National Defense Service Medal (with 1 bronze service star)	Vietnam Service Medal (with 3 bronze service stars)
4th Row	Army Overseas Service Ribbon (with Numeral 4)	Army Service Ribbon	Vietnam Campaign Medal
Badge	Senior Parachutist Badge	Army Staff Identification Badge	Ranger Tab

== Bibliography ==
- Certain Victory: The U.S. Army in the Gulf War, Potomac Books, 1994. ISBN 0-02-881111-9
- Firepower in Limited War, Ballantine Books, 1998. ISBN 0-89141-650-1
- America's Army in Transition: Preparing for War in the Precision Age, U.S. Army War College, 1999.
- Future Warfare: Anthology, U.S. Army War College, 2000. ISBN 1-58487-026-5
- The Iraq War: A Military History, Belknap Press, 2003. ISBN 0-674-01280-1,
- Yellow Smoke: The Future of Land Warfare for America's Military, Rowman & Littlefield, 2003. ISBN 0-7425-1773-X
- Lessons from the Iraq War, Berkeley Public Policy Press, 2004. ISBN 0-87772-416-4
- Scales on War: The Future of America's Military at Risk, Naval Institute Press, 2016. ISBN 9781682471029
