= Louisa Matthíasdóttir =

Icelandic-American artist (1917–2000)

- Born: February 20, 1917; Reykjavík
- Died: February 26, 2000 (aged 83)
- Website: louisamatthiasdottir.com

Louisa Matthíasdóttir (February 20, 1917 – February 26, 2000) was an Icelandic-American painter.

Louisa was born in Reykjavík. From 1925 to 1937 she grew up in the famous Höfði house since her family resided there. She showed artistic ability at an early age, and studied first in Denmark and then under Marcel Gromaire in Paris. Her early paintings, dating from the late 1930s, established her as a leading figure in the Icelandic avant-garde community (many of whom met together in a house in Reykjavík called Unuhús). In these paintings, subjects are painted with a broad brush, emphasizing geometric form. According to Louisa, "it was around this time that I started to do my paintings in one unbroken session". These paintings already show much of the character of Louisa's mature work, but are more subdued in color.

Her move to New York City in 1942 was followed by a period of study under Hans Hofmann, along with other painters including Robert De Niro, Sr. (father of the actor) and Jane Freilicher. In 1944, she married painter Leland Bell, and until Bell's death in 1991 they enjoyed a partnership of mutual support. Their daughter Temma was born in 1945.

During the mid-1940s, Louisa and Bell met Jean Hélion, whose figurative style may have influenced Louisa's use of outline in some of her paintings of this period, such as Leland and Temma (1948). Louisa 's first solo exhibition took place at Jane Street Gallery in New York in 1948. Louisa, Bell, and Temma visited Paris in 1951–52 where they frequently met with Hélion, who introduced them to Alberto Giacometti and Balthus.

While Louisa's work of the 1950s saw her introducing a painterly style of small, gestural brushstrokes and tonal gradations, during the 1960s she gradually abandoned tonality as her style became characterized by brisk execution and broad areas of forthright color.

The paintings of Louisa's final three decades include Icelandic landscapes, a series of self-portraits, and tabletop still-life arrangements. The landscapes often include charmingly stylized depictions of Icelandic horses and sheep. She was to remain an Icelandic citizen all her life, the physical characteristics of her native land informing her bold treatment of form and clarity of light. The poet John Ashbery described the result as the "flavor, both mellow and astringent, which no other painter gives us."

In 1996, Louisa was awarded the American-Scandinavian Foundation's Cultural Award, and in 1998 became a member of the American Academy of Arts and Letters. She died in Delhi, New York in 2000. Her work is represented in many public collections, including the Hirshhorn Museum and Sculpture Garden in Washington, D.C., the Art Institute of Chicago, and the Reykjavík Art Museum.

== Solo Exhibitions ==
- 1948: Jane Street Gallery, NYC
- 1958: Tanager Gallery, NYC
- 1960: University of Connecticut, Storrs
- 1964: Robert Schoelkopf Gallery, NYC
- 1966: Robert Schoelkopf Gallery, NYC
- 1968: Robert Schoelkopf Gallery, NYC
- 1969: Robert Schoelkopf Gallery, NYC
- 1970: Albrecht Art Museum, St. Joseph, Missouri
- 1970: Framehouse Gallery, Louisville, Kentucky
- 1972: Robert Schoelkopf Gallery, NYC
- 1972: Litchfield Art Center, Litchfield Connecticut
- 1972: Windham College, Putney, Vermont
- 1974: Robert Schoelkopf Gallery, NYC
- 1976: Robert Schoelkopf Gallery, NYC
- 1978: Robert Schoelkopf Gallery, NYC
- 1978: University of New Hampshire, Durham
- 1980: Robert Schoelkopf Gallery, NYC
- 1982: Mount Holyoke College Art Museum, South Hadley, Massachusetts
- 1982: Robert Schoelkopf Gallery, NYC
- 1983: Gross McLeaf Gallery, Philadelphia, Pennsylvania
- 1984: Robert Schoelkopf Gallery, NYC
- 2011: From Unuhús to West 8th Street at Kjarvalstaðir, Reykjavík Art Museum
