= Leland Bell =

American painter (1922–1991)

Leland Bell (September 17, 1922 – September 18, 1991) was an American painter.

Leland Bell was a self-taught painter whose passion for the discipline of painting has inspired and influenced many. He was also a fierce advocate for artists that he admired. In the early years of his career these included Karl Knaths, Jean Arp, and Piet Mondrian. In these early years he worked as a guard at the Museum of Non-Objective Art. In the mid-1940s his allegiance to abstract painting receded after he formed a friendship with Jean Hélion, and Bell subsequently became a champion of Hélion, Fernand Léger, Balthus, Alberto Giacometti, and André Derain. Bell was also a jazz aficionado and drummer.

In 1944 he married the painter Louisa Matthíasdóttir (1917–2000), whose figurative style influenced his work. In contrast to Matthíasdóttir, who worked quickly, Bell labored over his paintings, sometimes for years. The couple had a daughter, Temma, in 1945. The family divided their time between New York and Matthíasdóttir's native Iceland.

Bell was active as a painter, teacher, and lecturer. In 1987, he had a retrospective exhibition at the Phillips Collection in Washington, DC. He was diagnosed with leukemia in the 1980s, and died September 18, 1991.
