= Jane Freilicher =

American painter (1924–2014)

- Born: November 19, 1924; New York City, U.S.
- Died: December 9, 2014 (aged 90); New York City, U.S.
- Education: Hans Hofmann
- Known for: Painter
- Movement: Representational
- Spouses: Jack Freilicher (c. 1941–1946); Joe Hazan (from 1957 to 2012)

Jane Freilicher (November 19, 1924 – December 9, 2014) was an American representational painter of urban and country scenes from her homes in lower Manhattan and Water Mill, Long Island. She was a member of the informal New York School beginning in the 1950s, and a muse to several of its poets and writers.

Freilicher was at the center of a milieu of important New York painters and poets, including painters Helen Frankenthaler, Joan Mitchell, Grace Hartigan, Fairfield Porter, Larry Rivers, and poets of the New York School including John Ashbery, Kenneth Koch, Frank O'Hara and James Schuyler. Along with Frankenthaler, Hartigan, Mitchell, and Nell Blaine, she was among only a handful of women artists who were exhibiting alongside their male counterparts.

In 1996 she was awarded the Annual Academy of the Arts Lifetime Achievement Award from the Guild Hall Museum in East Hampton, New York.

== Personal life ==
Jane Niederhoffer was born in Brooklyn on November 19, 1924. Her parents were linguist Martin and musician Bertha Niederhoffer. She enjoyed painting and drawing as a young child and thought "I might do something in art, not for fame or achievement, but out of a romantic inclination to beautiful things. A free-floating feeling that something was creative in me."

At 17 she graduated from high school and eloped with Jack Freilicher, a jazz pianist. They were married from about 1941 to 1946, when the marriage was annulled. She met Larry Rivers through Jack Freilicher and Hans Hofmann and in the 1950s Rivers and Freilicher were good friends. In 1952 she met Joe Hazan, who was a businessman and dancer before becoming a painter. They were married in 1957 and had one child, Elizabeth. She lived and worked on Fifth Avenue in Manhattan and the couple had a summer house which they built on Mecox Bay in Water Mill on Long Island, New York. Hazan died on October 27, 2012, at 96 years of age. Freilicher died in Manhattan at the age of 90 on December 9, 2014. She is survived by her daughter, painter Elizabeth Hazan, and three grandchildren, Lucian, Katherine, and Benjamin Hicks.

== Art ==
Jane Freilicher, Champion Flowers, oil on linen, 1999, Tibor de Nagy

Freilicher studied art under Hans Hofmann and in 1947 earned her bachelor's degree at Brooklyn College. She received her master's degree in 1948 from Columbia University's Teacher's College, where the art historian Meyer Schapiro was one of her teachers.

As the result of Hofmann's influence she first made abstract expressionist paintings. Then, influenced by artist Pierre Bonnard, she settled into a "softly brushed, meditative lyric" paintings of still lifes and landscapes. She particularly made "urban pastoral" scenes of lower Manhattan and Water Mill scenes which appear to be taken as she looks out her windows on lower Fifth Avenue and Twelfth Street. "Usually there is a vase in the foreground, filled with flowers painted in lush, riotous colors, the light behind it..." The Long Island works feature nearby fields and sometimes Mecox Bay. The urban landscapes of lower Manhattan are taken from her penthouse view towards the Hudson River. Freilicher's work was considered by art critic Hilton Kramer to be "pre-eminent among the representational painters of the New York School's second generation." Critic Franklin Einspruch called Freilicher "one of the last true scions of Giorgio Morandi." Freilicher has also made woodcut, intaglio and lithograph prints.

In 1952 she began showing her works at Tibor de Nagy Gallery, which was also associated with poets.

In 2013 an exhibition "Jane Freilicher: Painter Among Poets" of her work was held at Tibor de Nagy in New York City. It reflected the relationships and inspiration that she was for James Schuyler, Frank O'Hara and Kenneth Koch. The exhibition traveled in 2014 to Chicago where it put on display at the Poetry Foundation.

In October 2017, New York's Paul Kasmin Gallery announced its representation of the Estate of Jane Freilicher.

== New York School ==
The paintings of Jane Freilicher, principally landscapes and still lifes, appear calm and assuming; therefore, it seems paradoxical that Freilicher herself should have inspired highly theatrical responses from the painters and poets who gathered around her during the formative years of the New York School.

— Encyclopedia of the New York School Poets

In the 1950s she became part of an informal circle of writers and artists called the New York School. She was featured in Mounting Tension, a 1950 film by Rudy Burckhardt in which John Ashbery and Larry Rivers fight for her affections. James Schuyler wrote Presenting Jane, in one scene she walked on water. In A Terrestrial Cuckoo O'Hara describes his dream of paddling down a jungle river with her, one of many poems he wrote about her.

Freilicher was a catalytic and consequential presence. She not only forged close friendships with this group of poets, she also served as a muse. They also regularly sought her advice for poems in progress. O'Hara wrote among his most celebrated series of poems about the artists which weaves her name into the titles. Ashbery and O'Hara both dedicated several books to her.

Her friends and fellow artists included Larry Rivers, Grace Hartigan and Fairfield Porter. Hartigan, Nell Blaine and Helen Frankenthaler also exhibited at Tibor de Nagy Gallery.

Freilicher's papers, including poetry and photographs, of her relationship with New York School writers and artists are now owned by the Houghton Library of Harvard University.

== Awards ==
- 1974 - American Association of University Women Fellowship
- 1976 - National Endowment of the Arts Grant
- 1987 - Saltus Gold Medal, National Academy of Design
- 1996 - Academy of the Arts Lifetime Achievement Award
- 2005 - Gold Medal for Painting, American Academy of Arts and Letter

== Exhibitions ==
=== Solo exhibitions ===
- Tibor de Nagy Gallery, New York, (12 exhibitions through 1967), 1952
- Cord Gallery, Southampton, New York, 1968
- Tibor de Nagy Gallery, New York, 1970
- John Bernard Myers Gallery, New York, 1971
- Benson Gallery, Bridgehampton, New York, 1972
- Benson Gallery, Bridgehampton, New York, 1974
- Fischbach Gallery, New York, 1975
- Wadsworth Atheneum, Hartford, Connecticut, 1976
- Fischbach Gallery, New York, 1977
- Fischbach Gallery, New York, 1979
- Utah Museum of Fine Arts, Salt Lake City, 1979

== Collections ==
- Brooklyn Museum, New York
- Cleveland Museum of Art, Ohio
- Grey Art Gallery, New York University, New York
- Hirshhorn Museum and Sculpture Garden, Washington, D.C.
- Metropolitan Museum of Art, New York
- Museum of Modern Art, New York
- National Academy Museum and School, New York
- Whitney Museum of American Art, New York
- Utah Museum of Fine Arts, Utah
