= List of books written by children or teenagers =

This is a list of notable books by young authors and of books written by notable writers in their early years. These books were written, or substantially completed, before the author's twentieth birthday.

- Alexandra Adornetto (born 18 April 1994) wrote her debut novel, The Shadow Thief, when she was 13. It was published in 2007. Other books written by her as a teenager are: The Lampo Circus (2008), Von Gobstopper's Arcade (2009), Halo (2010) and Hades (2011).
- Margery Allingham (1904–1966) had her first novel, Blackkerchief Dick, about smugglers in 17th century Essex, published in 1923, when she was 19.
- Jorge Amado (1912–2001) had his debut novel, The Country of Carnival, published in 1931, when he was 18.
- Prateek Arora wrote his debut novel Village 1104 at the age of 16. It was published in 2010.
- Daisy Ashford (1881–1972) wrote The Young Visiters while aged nine. This novella was first published in 1919, preserving her juvenile punctuation and spelling. An earlier work, The Life of Father McSwiney, was dictated to her father when she was four. It was published almost a century later in 1983.
- Piper Pittenger (born 2013) wrote her debut novel Tales of Fatala under the pen name of Jensen Pittenger at the age of 12.
- Kemi Ashing-Giwa (born 2000) wrote her debut novel, The Splinter in the Sky, when she was 19 in college. It was published when she was 22.
- Amelia Atwater-Rhodes (born 1984) had her first novel, In the Forests of the Night, published in 1999. Subsequent novels include Demon in My View (2000), Shattered Mirror (2001), Midnight Predator (2002), Hawksong (2003) and Snakecharm (2004).
- Jane Austen (1775–1817) wrote Lady Susan, a short epistolary novel, between 1793 and 1795 when she was aged 18–20.
- Ivan Baran (born 1996) started writing his debut novel Enzolart when he was 12 and published it when he was 17.
- Clair Blank (1915–1965) wrote several books in the Beverly Gray series and The Adventure Girls series in her teens.
- Ruskin Bond (born 1934) wrote his semi-autobiographical novel The Room on the Roof when he was 17. It was published in 1955.
- Marjorie Bowen (1885–1952) wrote the historical novel The Viper of Milan when she was 16. Published in 1906 after several rejections, it became a bestseller.
- Oliver Madox Brown (1855–1874) finished his novel Gabriel Denver in early 1872, when he was 17. It was published the following year.
- Pamela Brown (1924–1989) finished her children's novel about an amateur theatre company, The Swish of the Curtain (1941), when she was 16 and later wrote other books about the stage.
- John Buchan (1875–1940) wrote Sir Quixote of the Moors (1895) when he was 19 and an undergraduate at the University of Glasgow.
- Celeste and Carmel Buckingham wrote The Lost Princess when they were 11 and 9.
- Flavia Bujor (born 8 August 1988) wrote The Prophecy of the Stones (2002) when she was 13.
- Lord Byron (1788–1824) published two volumes of poetry in his teens, Fugitive Pieces and Hours of Idleness.
- Taylor Caldwell's The Romance of Atlantis was written when she was 12.
- Félix Francisco Casanova (1956–1976), Le Don de Vorace, was published in 1974.
- Hilda Conkling (1910–1986) had her poems published in Poems by a Little Girl (1920), Shoes of the Wind (1922) and Silverhorn (1924).
- Abraham Cowley (1618–1667), Tragicall History of Piramus and Thisbe (1628), Poetical Blossoms (published 1633).
- Maureen Daly (1921–2006) completed Seventeenth Summer before she was 20. It was published in 1942.
- Juliette Davies (born 2000) wrote the first book in the JJ Halo series when she was eight years old. The series was published the following year.
- Samuel R. Delany (born 1 April 1942) wrote his novel The Jewels of Aptor when he was 19. The book was published in 1962.
- Patricia Finney's A Shadow of Gulls was published in 1977 when she was 18. Its sequel, The Crow Goddess, was published in 1978.
- Barbara Newhall Follett (1914–1939?) wrote her first novel The House Without Windows at the age of eight. The manuscript was destroyed in a house fire and she later retyped her manuscript at the age of 12. The novel was published by Alfred A. Knopf in January 1927. That same year Barbara sailed as "cabin-boy" on the lumber schooner Frederick H. from New Haven to Bridgewater, Nova Scotia. Knopf published her narrative—The Voyage of the Norman D.—in 1928.
- Ford Madox Ford (né Hueffer) (1873–1939) published in 1892 two children's stories, The Brown Owl and The Feather, and a novel, The Shifting of the Fire.
- Anne Frank (1929–1945) wrote her diary for two-and-a-half years starting on her 13th birthday. It was published posthumously as Het Achterhuis in 1947 and then in English translation in 1952 as Anne Frank: The Diary of a Young Girl. An unabridged translation followed in 1996.
- Miles Franklin wrote My Brilliant Career (1901) when she was a teenager.
- Chloe Gong (born 1998) reached the New York Times Bestseller list with her novel These Violent Delights (2020), written when she was 19.
- Alec Greven's How to Talk to Girls was published in 2008 when he was nine years old. Subsequently he has published How to Talk to Moms, How to Talk to Dads and How to Talk to Santa.
- Faïza Guène (born 1985) had Kiffe kiffe demain published in 2004, when she was 19. It has since been translated into 22 languages, including English (as Kiffe Kiffe Tomorrow).
- Sonya Hartnett (born 1968) was thirteen years old when she wrote her first novel, Trouble All the Way, which was published in Australia in 1984.
- Alex and Brett Harris wrote the best-selling book Do Hard Things (2008), a non-fiction book challenging teenagers to "rebel against low expectations", at age 19. Two years later came a follow-up book called Start Here (2010).
- Georgette Heyer (1902–1974) wrote The Black Moth when she was 17 and received a publishing contract when she was 18. It was published just after she turned 19.
- Susan Hill (born 1942), The Enclosure, published in 1961.
- S. E. Hinton (born 1948), The Outsiders, first published in 1967.
- A. M. Homes (born 1961) wrote her novel Jack when she was 19, although it was not published until she was 28.
- Palle Huld (1912–2010) wrote A Boy Scout Around the World (Jorden Rundt i 44 dage) when he was 15, following a sponsored journey around the world.
- George Vernon Hudson (1867–1946) completed An Elementary Manual of New Zealand Entomology at the end of 1886, when he was 19, but not published until 1892.
- Katharine Hull (1921–1977) and Pamela Whitlock (1920–1982) wrote the children's outdoor adventure novel The Far-Distant Oxus in 1937. It was followed in 1938 by Escape to Persia and in 1939 by Oxus in Summer.
- Leigh Hunt (1784–1859) published Juvenilia; or, a Collection of Poems Written between the ages of Twelve and Sixteen by J. H. L. Hunt, Late of the Grammar School of Christ's Hospital in March 1801.
- Kody Keplinger (born 1991) wrote her debut YA book The DUFF when she was 17.
- Gordon Korman (born 1963), This Can't Be Happening at Macdonald Hall (1978), three sequels, and I Want to Go Home (1981).
- R. F. Kuang (born 1996) wrote her debut novel, The Poppy War, when she was 19 during a gap year in college.
- Benjamin Lebert (born 1982) published his debut novel, Crazy, when he was 16.
- Matthew Gregory Lewis (1775–1818) wrote the Gothic novel The Monk, now regarded as a classic of the genre, before he was twenty. It was published in 1796.
- Nina Lugovskaya (1918–1993), a painter, theater director and Gulag survivor, kept a diary in 1932–37, which shows strong social sensitivities. It was found in the Russian State Archives and published 2003. It appeared in English in the same year.
- Joyce Maynard (born 1953) completed Looking Back while she was 19. It was first published in 1973.
- Margaret Mitchell (1900–1949) wrote her novella Lost Laysen at the age of fifteen and gave the two notebooks containing the manuscript to her boyfriend, Henry Love Angel. The novel was published posthumously in 1996.
- Ben Okri, the Nigerian poet and novelist, (born 1959) wrote his first book Flowers and Shadows while he was 19.
- Alice Oseman (born 1994) wrote the YA novel Solitaire when she was 17 and it was published in 2014.
- Helen Oyeyemi (born 1984) completed The Icarus Girl while still 18. First published in 2005.
- Christopher Paolini (born 1983) wrote the first draft of Eragon, the first entry in the Inheritance Cycle, when he was 15. The book was first published by his parents' company in 2001 before getting picked up by Alfred A. Knopf.
- Emily Pepys (1833–1877), daughter of a bishop, wrote a vivid private journal over six months of 1844–45, aged ten. It was discovered much later and published in 1984.
- Beth Reekles (born 1995) had her first success with The Kissing Booth (2012), which was followed by Rolling Dice (2013) and Out of Tune (2014).
- Anya Reiss (born 1991) wrote her play Spur of the Moment when she was 17. It was both performed and published in 2010, when she was 18.
- Arthur Rimbaud (1854–1891) wrote almost all his prose and poetry while still a teenager, for example Le Soleil était encore chaud (1866), Le Bateau ivre (1871) and Une Saison en Enfer (1873).
- John Thomas Romney Robinson (1792–1882) saw his juvenile poems published in 1806, when he was 13.
- Françoise Sagan (1935–2004) had Bonjour tristesse published in 1954, when she was 18.
- Mary Shelley (1797–1851) completed Frankenstein; or, The Modern Prometheus during May 1817, when she was 19. It was first published in the following year.
- Percy Bysshe Shelley (1792–1822) wrote two Gothic novels when a student: Zastrozzi: A Romance (published 1810) and St. Irvyne; or, The Rosicrucian: A Romance (published 1811). Also a volume of poetry he wrote with his sister Elizabeth, Original Poetry by Victor and Cazire, was published in 1810.
- Austin Osman Spare (1886–1956), artist and magician, published his first book of paintings and poems, Earth Inferno, in 1905.
- Mattie Stepanek (1990–2004), an American poet, published seven best-selling books of poetry.
- John Steptoe (1950–1989), author and illustrator, began his picture book Stevie at 16. It was published in 1969 in Life.
- Anna Stothard (born 1983) saw her Isabel and Rocco published when she was 19.
- Dorothy Straight (born 1958) in 1962 wrote How the World Began, which was published by Pantheon Books in 1964. She holds the Guinness world record for the youngest female published author.
- Jalaluddin Al-Suyuti (c. 1445–1505) wrote his first book, Sharh Al-Isti'aadha wal-Basmalah, at the age of 17.
- F. J. Thwaites (1908–1979) wrote his bestselling novel The Broken Melody when he was 19.
- John Kennedy Toole (1937–1969) wrote The Neon Bible in 1954 when he was 16. It was not published until 1989.
- Jessica Watson (born 1993) wrote a memoir about sailing round the world, True Spirit, published in 2010.
- Alec Waugh (1898–1981) wrote his novel about school life, The Loom of Youth, after leaving school. It was published in 1917.
- Catherine Webb (born 1986) had five young adult books published before she was 20: Mirror Dreams (2002), Mirror Wakes (2003), Waywalkers (2003), Timekeepers (2004) and The Extraordinary and Unusual Adventures of Horatio Lyle (February 2006).
- Nancy Yi Fan (born 1993) published her debut Swordbird when she was 12. Other books she published as a teenager include Sword Quest (2008) and Sword Mountain (2012).
- Kat Zhang (born 1991) was 19 when she sold, in a three-book deal, her entire Hybrid Chronicles trilogy. The first book, What's Left of Me, was published 2012.

== See also ==
- Juvenilia
- Lists of books
