= Best Sellers (TV series) =

Best Sellers (also known as NBC Best Sellers) is a television series broadcast by NBC during the 1976–77 season. It is an anthology series consisting of miniseries, each one based on a best-selling historical novel that had been written in the last 10 years. In total, four miniseries were aired: Captains and the Kings, based on Captains and the Kings (1972); Once an Eagle, based on Once an Eagle (1968); Seventh Avenue, based on Seventh Avenue (1967); and The Rhinemann Exchange, based on The Rhinemann Exchange (1974). The theme music was composed by Elmer Bernstein, who also scored Captains and the Kings.

The concept was similar to 1950s television serialised dramas, when plays and novels were formatted into several broadcast episodes under a single umbrella program title. It was one of the earliest examples of the modern mini-series format. The format, however, apparently did not seem to work for NBC in the mid-1970s, which ended the series after one season.

== Miniseries ==
Captains and the Kings is based on Taylor Caldwell's 1972 novel Captains and the Kings. It consists of eight episodes, running 9 hours total, and was broadcast from September 30 to November 25, 1976. It is a rags-to-riches tale of an Irish immigrant family during the late 19th and early 20th centuries, and stars Richard Jordan, Perry King, and Patty Duke among others.

Once an Eagle is based on Anton Myrer's 1968 novel Once an Eagle. It consists of 7 episodes, running 9 hours total, and was broadcast from December 2, 1976 to January 13, 1977. It tells the story of two Army officers, one a ruthless, career-obsessed schemer, the other his exact opposite from World War I through World War II. It stars Sam Elliott, Cliff Potts, and Darleen Carr.

Seventh Avenue is based on Norman Bogner's 1967 novel Seventh Avenue. It consists of 6 episodes, running 6 hours total, and was broadcast from February 10 to 24, 1977 (the series was aired in two-episode blocks). It tells the story of a poor young man from Manhattan's Lower East Side who is determined to rise to the top of the garment industry on Seventh Avenue. It stars Steven Keats, Anne Archer and Jane Seymour.

The Rhinemann Exchange is based on Robert Ludlum's 1974 novel The Rhinemann Exchange. It consists of 3 episodes, running 5 hours total, and was broadcast from March 10 to 24, 1977. The story is about an intelligence officer in World War II dispatched by the U.S. government to arrange an exchange in Argentina of industrial diamonds needed by the Germans for a secret gyroscope needed by the Allies. It stars Stephen Collins, Lauren Hutton and Jose Ferrer.

== ITV airings ==
In Britain, ITV screened numerous miniseries in addition to the ones above under the Best Sellers banner until the mid-1980s, such as 79 Park Avenue, Studs Lonigan, A Man Called Intrepid, Condominium, Jacqueline Susann's Valley of the Dolls and Evening in Byzantium. Although it maintained the overall title, most were not produced by Universal Television, although 79 Park Avenue, Condominium and Evening in Byzantium were.

== Media ==
=== DVD releases ===
On 13 January 2009, Koch Vision released a 3-DVD set of Captains and the Kings on DVD in Region 1. The three-disc boxset features all eight episodes.

On 31 August 2010, Timeless Media Group released a 2-DVD set of Once an Eagle on DVD in Region 1. The two-disc boxset features all seven episodes.

On 31 July 2007, Universal Studios released The Rhinemann Exchange on DVD in Region 1. All three episodes are on one disk.

Seventh Avenue is not available on home video.

DVD name	Ep #	Release date
Captains and the Kings (3-disc box set)	8	13 January 2009
Once an Eagle (2-disc box set)	7	31 August 2010
The Rhinemann Exchange	3	31 July 2007
