= Seventh Avenue (novel) =

1967 novel by Norman Bogner

- 1966 first edition front cover
- Author: Norman Bogner
- Genre: Historical Novel
- Publication date: 1967

Seventh Avenue is a 1967 historical novel by Norman Bogner about the New York garment industry during the Great Depression of the 1930s. It is about a poor young man (Jay Blackman) who seeks to overcome his status, and through hard work rises to become a power in the garment industry.

It was reissued in paperback in 1968 and re-released in hardcover in 1998.

The book was adapted into a 1977 television miniseries of the same name by NBC, starring Steven Keats, Dori Brenner, Jane Seymour, Anne Archer, Ray Milland, Kristoffer Tabori, Eli Wallach, Jack Gilford and Alan King. The miniseries earned Emmy Award nominations for Keats and Brenner.
