= Captains and the Kings (miniseries) =

1976 television miniseries

Captains and the Kings is an eight-part television miniseries broadcast on NBC in 1976 as part of its Best Sellers anthology series. It is an adaptation of the 1972 novel Captains and the Kings by Taylor Caldwell. Like the novel, the miniseries is about an Irish American family, headed by ambitious Irish immigrant Joseph Armagh (played by Richard Jordan), which accumulates economic and political power during the 19th and early 20th centuries.

== Plot ==
The story begins when Joseph Armagh, a poor Irish immigrant, arrives in New York in 1857, and ends when his last son dies in 1912. Armagh gains wealth and power after investing in the early oil industry. He becomes obsessed with having one of his sons get elected as the first Irish Catholic U.S. president, but that desire is unfulfilled, for his politician son, Rory, is assassinated.

== Cast ==
Starring

- Richard Jordan as Joseph Armagh
- Perry King as Rory Armagh (ep. 6–8, guest star ep. 5)

Guest stars

- Patty Duke Astin as Bernadette Hennessey Armagh
- Ray Bolger as R.J. Squibbs
- Neville Brand as O'Herlihy (ep. 1–2)
- Blair Brown as Elizabeth Healey Hennessey
- John Carradine as Father Hale
- Katherine Crawford as Mary Armagh
- Peter Donat as Clair Montrose (ep. 1–5)
- Charles Durning as Ed Healey
- Henry Fonda as Senator Enfield Bassett
- Celeste Holm as Sister Angela
- John Houseman as Judge Newell Chisholm (ep. 3–8)
- David Huffman as Sean Armagh (ep. 6–8)
- Burl Ives as Old Syrup
- Harvey Jason as Harry Zieff
- Vic Morrow as Tom Hennessey
- Barbara Parkins as Martinique
- Joanna Pettet as Katherine Hennessey
- Pernell Roberts as Braithwaite (ep. 1–5)
- Jane Seymour as Marjorie Chisholm
- Ann Sothern as Mrs. Finch
- Robert Vaughn as Charles Desmond

Co-starring

- Bernard Behren as Gentleman
- Cynthia Sikes as Claudia
- Terry Kiser as Courtney Wickersham
- Doug Heyes Jr. as Kevin Armagh
- Jenny Sullivan as Honora Houlihan
- Beverly D'Angelo as Miss Emmy
- Joe Kapp as Strickland
- Ann Dusenberry as Anne-Marie
- Rod Haase as Mace
- Charles H. Gray as Captain Calvin
- Charles O. Lynch as Hotel Clerk
- Roberta Storm as Mrs. Calvin
- Sian Barbara Allen as Cara Leslie
- Lee de Broux as Teddy Roosevelt
- Robert Donner as Wounded Texan
- George Gaynes as Orestes Bradley
- Stefan Gierasch as Gannon
- Alan Hewitt as Gov. Hackett
- Cliff De Young as Brian Armagh
- Clifton James as Gov. Skerritt
- Roger Robinson as Cpl. Lincoln Douglas
- Ken Swofford as Capt. Muldoon
- Terence Locke as Faylen
- William Prince as Jay Regan
- Ford Rainey as Abraham Lincoln
- Richard Herd as Talmadge
- Walter O. Miles as Doctor
- Mills Watson as Preston
- John Herbsleb as Young Courtney
- Macon McCalman as Dolan
- James O'Connell as Orren Teale
- Patrick Labyorteaux as Young Rory
- Leslie Simms as Mrs. Teale
- Johnny Doran as Young Joseph
- Harvey Gold as Miles Lawrence
- Sally Kirkland as Aggie
- George Skaff as Prosecutor
- Philip Bourneuf as Father Scanlon
- Edward Edwards as 1st Soccer Player
- John Dennis Johnston as Medical Orderly
- Ronald Long as Hotel Clerk
- Connie Kreski as Pearl Gray
- Kermit Murdock as James Spaulding
- Eldon Quick as Albert
- Randy Shields as 2nd Soccer Player
- William Bryant as Skeeter
- William D. Gordon as Doctor Gill
- Sandy Ward as Louie
- Vincent Milana as 1st Striker
- Norman Stuart as Swiss Gentleman
- Ned Wilson as Van Cleve
- Stephen Coit as President William McKinley
- John de Lancie as Timothy Armagh
- Sterling Swanson as Spokesman
- Ted Gehring as Heckler
- Patrick Whyte as English Gentleman
- Todd Martin as Bensinger
- Ben Wright as German Gentleman
- Albert Carrier as French Gentleman
- Byron Webster as William Jennings Bryan
- Grant Owens as Captain O'Neill
- Elizabeth Cheshire as Young Bernadette
- Richard Matheson as President James A. Garfield

== Awards ==
Both Patty Duke and Jane Seymour were nominated for the Emmy Award for Outstanding Lead Actress in a Limited Series for their performances; Duke won the award. Jordan won a Golden Globe Award and an Emmy nomination for his performance. Durning was nominated for both an Emmy and a Golden Globe. Beverly D'Angelo made her debut. Cinematographer Ric Waite won his only Emmy Award for his work on the miniseries.
