= Lenny Wolpe =

American musical theatre actor (born 1951)

- Born: March 25, 1951 (age 74); Newburgh, New York, U.S.
- Education: George Washington University (BA)
- Occupation: Actor

Lenny Wolpe (born March 25, 1951) is an American musical theatre actor who has appeared in Broadway musicals including Wicked and The Drowsy Chaperone.

== Early life ==
Wolpe was born in Newburgh, New York. Wolpe majored in American history at George Washington University and was active in the university's theater department. Upon graduation, Wolpe attended graduate school at the University of Minnesota to teach theater.

== Career ==
Wolpe made his Broadway debut in Onward Victoria, which closed on opening night. Other Broadway appearances include Copperfield (Mr. Dick), Into the Light (Peter Vonn), and The Sound of Music (replacement for Max Dettweiler). While in a national tour of Little Shop of Horrors, Wolpe was asked to audition for The Drowsy Chaperone by producer Roy Miller, with whom he had worked at the Paper Mill Playhouse in New Jersey. Wolpe was cast as Feltzeig, a producer. Wolpe created the role of the Wizard in Wicked's original workshops in Los Angeles. Beginning July 10, 2007, he played the Wizard on Broadway. Wolpe played his final performance as the Wizard in the Broadway company on July 27, 2008, and was replaced by P.J. Benjamin. Wolpe recently reprised the role as The Wizard in the first U.S. National Tour of Wicked, where he replaced Lee Wilkof. His run started on September 6, 2008 and ended exactly a year later. Wolpe was succeeded by Richard Kline. In addition to Little Shop, Wolpe has appeared in National tours of A Funny Thing Happened on the Way to the Forum and South Pacific. Off-Broadway, Wolpe has appeared in Mayor (Mayor Koch), Brownstone, Company, and The Wonder Years. His regional theatre credits include The Baker's Wife (Baker), Gypsy (Herbie opposite Betty Buckley), The Tale of the Allergist's Wife (Paper Mill Playhouse), A Class Act, Radio Gals (Pasadena Playhouse), Fiddler on the Roof (Tevye in six productions), Fiorello!, and She Loves Me (Reprise! L.A.).

On television, he was a series regular on Baby Talk and You're the One. Wolpe has guest starred on more than 80 television programs including L.A. Law (on which he played a victim of Tourette syndrome), ER, Six Feet Under, The Golden Girls, The King of Queens, Ally McBeal, and Chappelle's Show.

In May 2012, Wolpe premiered in the role of Morty in a new off-Broadway show based on the eponymous Old Jews Telling Jokes podcast.

== Filmography ==
=== Film ===
| Year | Title | Role | Notes |
|---|---|---|---|
| 1994 | Murder Between Friends | Janet’s Lawyer | |
| 1994 | S.F.W. | Phil Connors | |
| 2000 | What's Eating You? | Dr. Bader | |

=== Television ===
| Year | Title | Role | Notes |
|---|---|---|---|
| 1980 | Broadway on Showtime | Timothy D. McGee | Episode: "Little Johnny Jones" |
| 1990 | Major Dad | Commander Abe Rosen | Episode: "Lemon" |
| 1990 | L.A. Law | Noah Cowen | 2 episodes |
| 1991 | Baby Talk | Howard | 11 episodes |
| 1991 | The Torkelsons | Mr. Wheeler | Episode: "An American Almost in Paris" |
| 1991 | Locked Up: A Mother's Rage | Marty DeLuca | Television film |
| 1991 | The Golden Girls | Arnie | Episode: "Dateline: Miami" |
| 1991 | Sisters | Dr. Reinholdt | 2 episodes |
| 1991 | Who's the Boss? | Garry Havlock | Episode: "The Sold House" |
| 1992 | Billy | Ed | Episode: "Pilot" |
| 1992 | Matlock | Doug Pinter | Episode: "The Abduction" |
| 1992 | Secrets | Harry Pizer | Television film |
| 1992 | Civil Wars | Arthur Hancock | Episode: "Grin and Bare It" |
| 1992 | Blossom | Jim Thompson | Episode: "The Making of the President" |
| 1993 | Murphy Brown | Bob | Episode: "Back to the Ball" |
| 1993 | Roseanne | Frank Denvers | Episode: "Wait till Your Father Gets Home" |
| 1993 | And the Band Played On | Dr. Joseph Bove | Television film |
| 1993 | Married... with Children | Father | Episode: "Change for a Buck" |
| 1994 | Mad About You | Monty | Episode: "Paul Is Dead" |
| 1994 | Diagnosis: Murder | Insurance Agt. Nathan Keys | Episode: "The Last Laugh: Part 2" |
| 1994 | Boy Meets World | Car Dealer | Episode: "The Beard" |
| 1995 | Coach | Dr. Matthews | Episode: "Did Someone Call Me Snorer?" |
| 1995 | Bless This House | Pete Seifert | Episode: "A Fight a Day Keeps the Doctor Away" |
| 1995 | Step by Step | Yum Yum Executive | Episode: "Baby Come Back" |
| 1995 | The John Larroquette Show | Mr. Lewis | Episode: "An Odd Cup of Tea" |
| 1996 | Project: ALF | Dr. Newman | Television film |
| 1996 | Murder One | Ezra Nagel | Episode: "Chapter Twenty-Three" |
| 1996 | Party of Five | Strause | Episode: "Not So Fast" |
| 1996 | Something So Right | Mr. Sandzimier | 2 episodes |
| 1997 | Martin | Loafer | 2 episodes |
| 1997 | Pacific Palisades | Mitch Berlatski | 3 episodes |
| 1998 | House Rules | Randy Hicks | Episode: "Riley's New Job" |
| 1998 | You're the One | Sy Weitz | 3 episodes |
| 1998 | Working | Lawyer #1 | Episode: "Due Process" |
| 1999 | Ally McBeal | James Russell | Episode: "Saving Santa" |
| 2000 | The Norm Show | Mr. Jacobs | Episode: "Norm vs. the Oldest Profession" |
| 2000 | ER | Dr. George Hudson | Episode: "Be Still My Heart" |
| 2000 | The Jamie Foxx Show | Edwin | Episode: "Hot Coco on a Cold Night" |
| 2000 | Beverly Hills, 90210 | Rabbi | Episode: "Ode to Joy" |
| 2001 | Nikki | Mr. Healy | Episode: "Superhero Blues" |
| 2001 | The King of Queens | Dr. Berger | Episode: "Lyin' Hearted" |
| 2003 | Six Feet Under | Gregory Fasteau | Episode: "Everyone Leaves" |
| 2004 | Crossing Jordan | Ronald Cosgrove | Episode: "Til Death Do Us Part" |
| 2004 | Chappelle's Show | Prosecutor #1 | Episode: "Oprah's Baby Daddy & Jury Duty" |
| 2010 | Law & Order: SVU | Dr. Green | Episode: "Gray" |
| 2018 | The Good Fight | Judge John Evans | Episode: "Day 492" |
| 2018–2022 | After Forever | Carl | 10 episodes |
