= Seventh Avenue (miniseries) =

Seventh Avenue is a six-part American television miniseries broadcast in 1977. It is based on the 1967 Norman Bogner novel of the same name. The miniseries was directed by Richard Irving and Russ Marberry, and produced by Franklin Barton and Richard Irving. The music is by Nelson Riddle.

Seventh Avenue was broadcast on NBC from February 10 to February 24, 1977 as six episodes in three two-hour blocks, as part of NBC's weekly miniseries series, Best Sellers. It stars Steven Keats, Dori Brenner, Anne Archer and Jane Seymour.

The storyline deals with a poor young man (Keats) from Manhattan's Lower East Side who is determined to rise to the top of the garment industry on Seventh Avenue.

== Cast ==
- Steven Keats - Jay Blackman
- Dori Brenner - Rhoda Gold Blackman
- Jane Seymour - Eva Myers
- Anne Archer - Myrna Gold
- Kristoffer Tabori - Al Blackman
- Herschel Bernardi - Joe Vitelli
- Richard Dimitri - Frank Topo
- Jack Gilford - Finklestein
- Mike Kellin - Morris Blackman
- Alan King - Harry Lee
- Ray Milland - Douglas Fredericks
- Paul Sorvino - Dave Shaw
- Eli Wallach - Gus Farber
- William Windom - John Myers
- John Pleshette - Marty Cass
- Robert Symonds - Edward Gold
- Anna Berger - Celia Blackman
- Joshua Freund - Neal Blackman
- Gloria Grahame - Moll
- Brock Peters - Sgt. Rollins
- Ellen Greene - Paula Cass
- Richard Kline - Horton
- Lou Cristolo - Creeden
- Ron Max - Ray Boone
- Graham Beckel - Det. Clever
