= Privilege (film) =

1967 British film by Peter Watkins

- Film Poster
- Directed by: Peter Watkins
- Written by: Norman Bogner
- Produced by: John Heyman
- Starring: Paul Jones; Jean Shrimpton; Mark London; Jeremy Child
- Cinematography: Peter Suschitzky
- Edited by: John Trumper
- Music by: Mike Leander
- Color process: Technicolor
- Production companies: John Heyman/Peter Watkins Production; World Film Services; Memorial Enterprises
- Distributed by: Rank Film Distributors (UK); Universal Pictures (US)
- Release dates: 28 February 1967 (UK); 24 July 1967 (NYC)
- Running time: 103 minutes
- Country: United Kingdom
- Language: English
- Budget: $700,000

Privilege is a 1967 British musical science fiction comedy-drama film directed by Peter Watkins, starring English singer Paul Jones and model Jean Shrimpton. It tells the story of a famous popstar, Steven Shorter, who is used as a tool by the state to divert people from political activity, and keep the population in check. It was produced by John Heyman. Johnny Speight wrote the story, and Norman Bogner wrote the script.

== Plot ==
The story is presented as a narrated documentary, set in a near-future 1970s England, and concerning a disillusioned pop singer, Steven Shorter, who is the most loved celebrity in the country. His stage show involves him appearing on stage in a jail cell with handcuffs, beaten by police, to the horror and sympathy of the audience. It is described that the two main parties of England have formed a coalition government and encourage the success of Shorter to placate the masses and divert them from political activity. Shorter is consistently monitored and manipulated by handlers consisting of manager Martin Crossley, public relations representative Alvin Kirsch, record company executive Julie Jordan, and financial backer Andrew Butler. Businesses including nightclubs, shopping centers, product brands, and media outlets, carry Shorter's name, demonstrating his appeal to consumers. An artist, Vanessa Ritchie has been hired to paint his portrait, and Shorter gravitates to her amidst his loneliness and isolation.

Demands upon Shorter's time and energy increases. He is asked to film a commercial for the country's apple growers, hoping to convince citizens to eat a disproportionately large amount of apples to make up for a surplus supply. More ominously, the collective churches of England strike an arrangement with the government and Shorter's empire to turn him into a messianic leader that will boost church attendance and a sense of national unity. An image change is announced in advance of a huge stadium concert, where he will publicly "repent," no longer perform in handcuffs, and will espouse religious themes in his songs. Shorter's equilibrium becomes more shaky; at a picnic where lobster is served, he absurdly orders hot chocolate to drink, and everyone present in turn orders hot chocolate as well, demonstrating he will be enabled at all times.

The stadium rally has a record attendance, and features militarised performance from various nationalist organisations. A firebrand preacher, Reverend Jeremy Tate, tells the assembled crowd they will be handed cards reading "We Will Conform," rails against the perceived post-war apathy in the country, and demands they repeat the words at his prompting, which they follow. Shorter and his band take the stage, with the band members wearing costumes and assuming poses reminiscent of Nazi Germany. Disabled citizens are given preferential seating to the stage, in the hopes Shorter's music will heal them. When Shorter later watches footage of the rally on television, he is disgusted at the display, and goes on a furniture-breaking tear. He also reveals to Vanessa that contrary to the publicity that his old show was just an act, he bears real scars and bruises from being legitimately assaulted by the mock policemen in the act.

Shorter's record company holds a formal event to give him an achievement award and profess theirs and the nation's love for him. Shorter finally breaks down, inarticulately declaring disgust for the public that cannot see past his charade, and asking to be seen as an individual and not the inflated deity he has been presented as. After stunned silence, the public reacts angrily, and his popularity immediately plummets. Andrew Butler announces his immediate resignation from the Shorter organisation, as it is no longer lucrative for his investors. The narrator states that to placate the now-hateful masses, and to preserve the viability of the still extant businesses that carry his name, Shorter's music will be banned from airplay, and he shall not be allowed to speak or perform publicly again.

In postscript, the narrator reveals that there is little left of Shorter's career, and over archival footage of him ("with the soundtrack removed, of course..."), declares, "It is going to be a happy time in England, this year in the future."

== Musical score ==
The music for the film was written by Mike Leander and featured Jones performing the title track, "I've Been a Bad, Bad Boy" (a number five hit record) and "Free Me," released in the United States as a single on the Reprise label by the band "The Pace." English singer/songwriter George Bean, playing the primary leader of Shorter's back up band "The Runner Beans," sings the traditional religious songs "Onward, Christian Soldiers" and "Jerusalem." A soundtrack album was released in the US and UK.

In 1978, the Patti Smith Group recorded "Free Me" as "Privilege (Set Me Free)" on their album Easter. The recording reached number 72 on the UK singles chart and number 13 on the singles chart in Ireland.

In 1988, Big Audio Dynamite opened their single "Just Play Music!" with an audio sample from the film.

"Free Me" was part of the soundtrack of 2019 Guy Ritchie film The Gentlemen.

== Release ==
According to Peter Watkins' website: "The national cinema circuit in the UK, J. Arthur Rank, refused to show the film for something to do with what they deemed its 'immoral nature'. Universal Pictures withdrew the film after brief screenings in a few countries, and the film has been rarely shown since – very occasionally on TV."

== Reception ==
Upon release, British critics attacked the film for being “hysterical” as they did not buy the overall message, while American critics were slightly kinder. The acting of Jean Shrimpton and Paul Jones was heavily criticised, as well as the movie's televisional style.

The Monthly Film Bulletin wrote: "It's a mad, mad Watkins world, and no amount of incidental quoting from Lonely Boy (as Privilege does, at length, and without acknowledgement) makes it look like anybody else's. One quarrels not so much with Watkins' frenzied conviction that if the bomb fails the Government will turn – or is already turning – to sainted pop-singers to keep the country manageable; writers such as Vidal, Heinlein and Stapledon have expounded similar theories persuasively enough in the past. What hangs around Watkins' neck is sheer lack of professionalism: his film is a mass of poor scripting, inept acting, and directionless, irrelevant camerawork and editing."

Kine Weekly wrote: "Every now and then someone makes a film with a worthwhile point of view, full of disturbing ideas. This is in that category. It cannot qualify as popular entertainment, but it deserves better treatment from the paying public than it is likely to get. ... The director, Peter Watkins, is the young man who made the clever and controversial The War Game. He is clearly a competent film technician: an artist with a strong social conscience and an enviable talent for being able to interest onlookers in his warnings. Here he has a situation without a plot and contrives to give a frighteningly clear exposition of how morally destructive can be the results of the manipulation of mass hysteria for impurely political ends. The parable is all the more forceful because reality is only just round the corner from Mr. Watkin's dramatic invention. He has treated the story as though it were a documentary in the style of cinema verité, the action being interspersed with interviews, in which the parody is occasionally too broad, but the photographic treatment of the mass meetings is immensely powerful."

On review aggregator Rotten Tomatoes, the movie has a 57% "Fresh" from a total of 21 reviews.

== Home media ==
Privilege was released on DVD in the UK on the BFI's Flipside imprint. The disc included two of Peter Watkins's short films: The Forgotten Faces (1961) and The Diary of an Unknown Soldier (1959), as well as the original Privilege trailer.

In the U.S., New Yorker Films released a DVD, under licence from Universal and with collaboration with Canadian firm Project X. This DVD release included Lonely Boy as well as an excerpt of an essay on that film as extra features.

A Blu-ray Disc version has also been released in the UK by the BFI, after problems due to "an issue with materials" were resolved.

== Cast ==
- Paul Jones as Steven Shorter
- Jean Shrimpton as Vanessa Ritchie
- Mark London as Alvin Kirsch
- William Job as Andrew Butler
- Max Bacon as Julie Jordan
- Jeremy Child as Martin Crossley
- James Cossins as Professor Tatham
- Frederick Danner as Marcus Hooper
- Victor Henry as Freddie K
- Arthur Pentelow as Leo Stanley
- Steve Kirby as Squit
- Malcolm Rogers as the Reverend Jeremy Tate
- Doreen Mantle as Miss Crawford
- Michael Graham as Timothy Arbutt
- Michael Barrington as the Bishop of Essex
