= Cassie & Co. =

1982 American drama television series

- Genre: Drama
- Starring: Angie Dickinson; John Ireland; Dori Brenner; A Martinez; Alex Cord
- Country of origin: United States
- Original language: English
- No. of seasons: 1
- No. of episodes: 13

Production
- Executive producers: Carol Evan McKeand; Nigel McKeand
- Producer: Michael Rhodes
- Running time: 42 minutes
- Production companies: Carson Productions; Saracen Productions

Original release
- Network: NBC
- Release: January 29 – August 20, 1982

Cassie & Co. is an American drama television series starring Angie Dickinson, John Ireland, Dori Brenner, A Martinez, and Alex Cord. The series aired on NBC from January 29, 1982, to August 20, 1982.

== Cast ==
- Angie Dickinson as Cassie Holland
- John Ireland as Lyman 'Shack' Shackelford
- Dori Brenner as Meryl Foxx
- A Martinez as Benny Silva
- Alex Cord as Mike Holland
- Phil Rubenstein as Howie Schwartz
- Anne Ramsey as Bertha Crabbe
- Joshua Shelley as Eddy the Ear
- Hillary Carlip as Susie the Travel Agent

== Episodes ==
No.	Title	Directed by	Written by	Original release date
1	"The Golden Silence"	Alex March	Burton Armus and Will Lorin	January 29, 1982
2	"Replay"	Alex March	Carol Evan McKeand	February 5, 1982
3	"Gorky's Army"	Christian I. Nyby II	Mark Rosenthal	February 12, 1982
4	"Dark Side of the Moon"	Alf Kjellin	Mark Rosenthal	February 19, 1982
5	"One Thief Too Many"	Christian I. Nyby II	E. Nick Alexander	June 15, 1982
6	"Anything for a Friend"	Bob Kelljan	Robert Crais	June 22, 1982
7	"Man Overboard"	Bernard L. Kowalski	Richard Levinson and William Link	June 29, 1982
8	"Friend in Need"	Arnold Laven	Abram S. Ginnes	July 6, 1982
9	"There Went the Bride"	Alexander Singer	Peter Allan Fields	July 23, 1982
10	"Fade Out"	Alf Kjellin	Burton Armus	July 30, 1982
11	"One Less Vote"	Arnold Laven	Burton Armus	August 6, 1982
12	"Lover Come Back"	Lawrence Doheny	Burton Armus and Howard Berk	August 13, 1982
13	"A Ring Ain't Always a Circle"	Edward Parone	Burton Armus	August 20, 1982
