= Dynasty of Death =

1938 novel by Taylor Caldwell

- First edition
- Author: Taylor Caldwell
- Language: English
- Genre: Novel
- Publisher: Charles Scribner's Sons
- Publication date: 1938
- Publication place: United States
- Media type: Print (Hardback)
- Pages: 797 pp
- OCLC: 1357301
- Followed by: The Eagles Gather

Dynasty of Death was the debut novel of the Anglo-American writer Taylor Caldwell (1900–1985), released in September 1938 and published by Scribner's Sons. When Caldwell submitted the manuscript to Maxwell Perkins in 1937, she was an unknown housewife from Buffalo, New York. Before her identity was revealed, common speculation was that the author was male and a literary veteran writing under a pen name. Dynasty of Death launched her prolific career.

A sequel, The Eagles Gather, was released in January 1940.

== Background ==
The novel is set in Windsor, Pennsylvania, a fictional mill town on the Allegheny River north of Pittsburgh.

It is an epic multigenerational saga, stretching from 1837 to the eve of World War I, about the Bouchard and Barbour families, who grow their small munitions factory into a great international corporation.

Joseph Barbour is a servant who becomes a successful businessman and arms manufacturer. His younger son Martin is not interested in money and is an idealist and altruist. Elder son Ernest is an egoist who believes that money is the greatest power in the world. Ernest loves Amy Drumhill, the niece of Gregory Sessions, owner of a steel factory. Amy marries Martin, however, who establishes a hospital and dies in the American Civil War. Ernest's hardness ruins Joseph, and he is cursed by his mother.

This story of the Bouchard clan is continued through World War II in Caldwell's later novels The Eagles Gather (1940) and The Final Hour (1944), although the Pittsburgh setting is largely left behind as the family takes its place on the world stage.

== Reception ==
According to Scribner's Sons, the typical size for an advance printing was 3,000, with a 2,000 binding; Dynasty of Death had totaled 40,000.

Dynasty of Death was frequently praised contemporaneously for its depictions of munitions manufacturing in the United States and internationally. The Buffalo News wrote that Dynasty of Death was "little short of a masterpiece". However, it was often criticized for its length, well in excess of 700 pages; The Argus wrote that the story would have been better served at 400 or 500 pages.
