= The Far-Distant Oxus =

1937 novel

- First edition
- Author: Katharine Hull & Pamela Whitlock
- Illustrator: Pamela Whitlock
- Language: English
- Genre: Children's novel
- Publisher: Jonathan Cape
- Publication date: 1937
- Publication place: United Kingdom
- Media type: Print (Hardcover)
- Followed by: Escape to Persia

The Far-Distant Oxus is a 1937 British children's novel by Katharine Hull (1921–1977) and Pamela Whitlock (1920–1982), written while they were still children themselves. The title is taken from Matthew Arnold's poem Sohrab and Rustum, and the characters in the story choose names from it for the places around them in the north coast of Devon; the real Oxus is a river in Central Asia.

== Ponies and Exmoor ==
Hull and Whitlock met when they were pupils (14 and 15 years old respectively) at St Mary's School, Ascot, whilst sheltering from a thunderstorm. They discovered shared interests and decided to write a story about ponies set on Exmoor. They planned out the entire book and wrote alternate chapters, exchanging them afterwards for editing.

== Ransome and Cape ==
The story follows the model of the books of Arthur Ransome, describing the school holiday adventures of children of active, adventurous families, centred on outdoor activity and a vivid landscape soaked in imagination. Ransome had boats and Windermere, The Far-Distant Oxus ponies and the moors.

Whitlock sent the manuscript to Ransome in March 1937; he in turn brought it to his publisher Jonathan Cape, saying that he had "the best children's book of 1937" for him. Cape published the book in the Swallows and Amazons format and persuaded Ransome to write an introduction.

The Ransome introduction provides details of the way the authors wrote the book as they were still students at boarding school. The introduction also references early letters between Whitlock and Ransome and also Bridget Bodley, later Lady Bridget Faulks.

The book and its sequels use what has been termed the "Ransome method of geography"; that is, using real places but often set in different locations on their Exmoor map. For instance, the central location of Cloud Farm appears correct but associated locations close by may be found some distance away. This is a feature of Ransome's earlier works.

== Success ==
The book, illustrated by Whitlock, was successful; contemporary reviewers were impressed and critics today remain positive. The Cambridge Guide to Children's Books comments that it is "as absorbing as Ransome at his best". The two authors followed it with sequels Escape to Persia (1938) and The Oxus in Summer (1939). They wrote an unrelated book called Crowns (1947).

Fidra Books reissued the novel in August 2008.

Seven Stories, The National Centre for Children's Books in Newcastle upon Tyne now houses the Pamela Whitlock Archive. It contains the author's original art work for the books as well as correspondence between herself and Arthur Ransome, and letters to her husband, John Bell, immediately after Pamela had died.

== See also ==
- List of books written by children or teenagers
