= Romance of Atlantis =

Novel by Taylor Caldwell

The Romance of Atlantis
- First edition
- Author: Taylor Caldwell
- Language: English
- Genre: Fantasy
- Publisher: William Morrow & Co.
- Publication date: 1975
- Publication place: United States
- Pages: 269
- ISBN: 0449237877
- OCLC: 2291542

The Romance of Atlantis is a fantasy novel by the British-born American novelist Taylor Caldwell about the ancient, erudite, and very advanced civilisation of Atlantis.

Caldwell wrote this novel when she was twelve years old, and had attempted to publish it through her grandfather's publishing company, but he accused her of plagiarism because it seemed impossible that a twelve-year-old could have written such an advanced book, and it was not published until 1975, when Caldwell revised it with the assistance of Jess Stearn, and it was finally actually published. Caldwell based this book on a recurring dream she was having every night for about 2 years, each night the dream beginning where it ended the previous night. The dream was so real, that she began to believe that it was her real life.

== Plot summary ==
Atlantis is ruled by the beautiful and intelligent Empress Salustra. The fate of the Empire will be decided by an arranged marriage with the ruler of a less advanced, semi-barbarian northern kingdom, as the advanced technology of Atlantis is powerless against strange environmental and ecological disasters.
