= Captains and the Kings =

Novel by Taylor Caldwell

- Front Cover (1972)
- Author: Taylor Caldwell
- Language: English
- Genre: Historical Novel
- Publisher: Fawcett Publications
- Publication date: 1972
- Publication place: United States
- Pages: 816
- OCLC: 318377470
- Preceded by: On Growing Up Tough
- Followed by: To Look and Pass

Captains and the Kings is a 1972 historical novel by Taylor Caldwell chronicling the rise to wealth and power of an Irish immigrant, Joseph Francis Xavier Armagh, who emigrates as a penniless teenager to the United States, along with his younger brother and baby sister, only for their parents to die shortly afterwards. Joseph Armagh befriends a Lebanese immigrant, and both are taken under the tutelage of an American plutocrat. The novel is an inter-generational saga that focuses on the themes of the American dream, discrimination, bigotry, and history that is being made by a cabal of the rich and powerful. The saga nears its end when Armagh succeeds in making his eldest son, Rory (modeled after John Fitzgerald Kennedy), a senator. When Rory is going to become the first Catholic President of the United States, he is assassinated by the cabal of the rich and powerful.

The novel was adapted as a 1976 television miniseries of the same name, starring Richard Jordan as Joseph Armagh.

== Plot ==
Young Joseph Armagh, whose parents recently died after giving birth to his sister, is left to venture towards Boston with his younger brother and the baby. He made a promise to his dying mother that he will always care for his siblings. His determination carries him through years of shady-deal making and his gradual accumulation of wealth and power. As his siblings mature into adulthood, they choose different paths in life, with his brother becoming an Irish singer and his sister taking monastic vows. Joseph's personal life also suffers with his focus to take on the global power brokers, with his younger son having been accidentally killed while working as a war correspondent during the Spanish-American War and his daughter suffering a riding accident that rendered her into an infantile state. Much of Joseph's focus is on forcing his eldest son Rory to climb the political ladder in order to become the first Catholic President of the United States, at the expense of Rory's personal life, to include dissolving a marriage that Joseph believed would have been a political liability for Rory.

== Publication ==
The novel was one of the top 10 best-sellers of 1972, as ranked by The New York Times Best Seller list. Caldwell drew heavily on aspects of the Kennedy family, John D. Rockefeller and Howard Hughes. However, Caldwell also states in the book's prologue that the Armagh family was entirely fictional and was not intended to lampoon or criticize any known figures.

== Adaptation ==
The book was adapted into an eight-part television miniseries, also called Captains and the Kings, by NBC in the 1976 broadcast season as part of its Best Sellers series.
