= Flavia Bujor =

French writer and literary critic (born 1988)

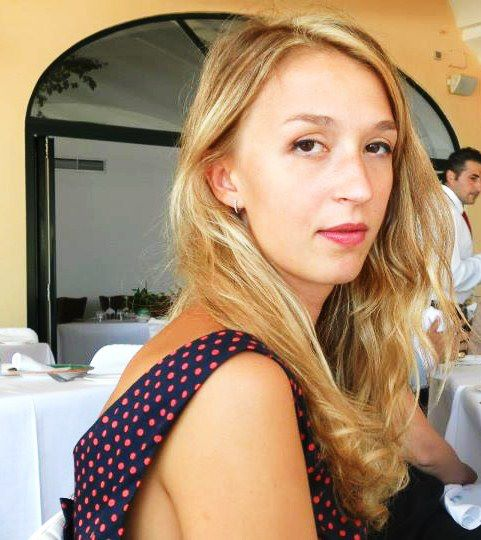

Flavia Bujor is a French novelist of Romanian origin. She lived in Romania until the age of two when she moved to Paris, France. Her first book was the children's story The Prophecy of the Stones or "The Prophecy of The Gems" (original title: "La Prophétie des Pierres"), which she wrote at age 13. It has been translated into twenty-three different languages.
