= This Can't Be Happening at Macdonald Hall =

1978 novel by Gordon Korman

- First edition, 1978
- Author: Gordon Korman
- Original title: This Can't Be Happening at Macdonald Hall!
- Cover artist: Rodrigo Moreno, Luis Borba, by Yüksel Hassan (2003 version)
- Language: English
- Series: Macdonald Hall Series
- Genre: Comedy
- Publisher: Scholastic Canada Ltd.
- Publication date: 1978, 2003
- Publication place: Canada
- Media type: Print (Paperback)
- Pages: 105 (not counting preview at the end)
- ISBN: 0-439-97429-1
- Followed by: Go Jump in the Pool

This Can't Be Happening at Macdonald Hall is a 1978 novel by Gordon Korman. It is the first installment of the Macdonald Hall series, and was the first written work of Korman. It is dedicated to his English teacher, Mr. Hamilton.

The book was republished in 2003 with a new look and updated text (updated to match today's economy and slang). The title was also shortened to This Can't Be Happening!. The rest of the books in the series would all eventually be republished. Cover photos and illustrations were done by Rodrigo Moreno, Luis Borba and Yüksel Hassan.

The book was the focus of an episode of the television series Great Canadian Books in 2010. The member of parliament and future Canadian prime minister Justin Trudeau described it as "a wonderfully funny story that appeals to the adolescent in all of us" and as the book that awoke his interest in reading.

In the 2010s, Aircraft Pictures has produced the Bruno & Boots series of television film adaptations of Korman's novel series. In spring 2017, This Can't Be Happening was released as the second film of the series.

== Plot summary ==
The two main characters, Bruno Walton and Melvin “Boots” O'Neal, are small-time troublemakers who share a room at the Macdonald Hall boarding school east of Toronto, just off Highway 48. Circa 1980. Across the road is a girls' boarding school, Miss Scrimmage's Finishing School For Young Ladies. Best friends, they play mischievous pranks on the school, faculty and other students. They are constantly under the watch of Headmaster William Sturgeon, nicknamed “The Fish” due to his surname but also due to the trademark stern, fishy-like stare he uses on his students whenever he disapproves of them.

Following the abduction of an overweight cat mascot of a rival hockey team (in an attempt to demoralize them) and swapping the school's Canadian flag for the flag of Malbonia, Sturgeon forbids them from seeing each other and separates them. Bruno moves in with the school genius, Elmer Drimsdale, while Boots is placed with wealthy hypochondriac George Wexford-Smith III. The two can't stand their new roommates and decide to meet at a cannon at night to discuss ways of getting back into their old room together.

The two prominent ideas they have, including having both Elmer and George complain to the headmaster to get them to move elsewhere, and then framing their roommates to have themselves moved away from them, get them into more trouble.

Eventually they come up with the idea to study hard to get into the Honor Roll to show they're capable and should be able to move back in together as a reward, but the plan backfires after Sturgeon attributes the boys' resulting high marks as the result of their separation. In desperation they meet again, but en route to the cannon, they spot an entangled hot air balloon stuck in a tree and find a boy stuck up there. They rescue the boy named Francisco using a volleyball net and take him to Sturgeon, who realizes he's the son of an important ambassador from Ottawa who got lost in a balloon during the day. They are then interrupted by Elmer Drimsdale, who witnessed the balloon in his telescope and had concluded it was a UFO. He causes a massive disturbance between both schools.

The next morning, the Ambassador arrives at the school to retrieve his lost son and honor the people responsible for rescuing him – Bruno, Boots, and Elmer, who receive medals from the RCMP, the Ontario Provincial Police, and the Ambassador, who is ironically representing the country of Malbonia, the country of which flag Bruno and Boots had used in a prank earlier in the novel. For Macdonald Hall to honour them, Elmer receives a new telescope and Bruno and Boots get their wish – to share a room again.

== Other details ==
- This book was written as a grade 7 English project. The author sent it off to Scholastic, which decided to publish it.
- As the first installment of the series, this novel introduces the main and recurring characters that appear in most of the rest of the books in the series, notably Bruno Walton, Melvin “Boots” O'Neal, Elmer Drimsdale, Perry Elbert, Cathy Burton, Diane Grant, and George Wexford-Smyth III. In the second novel, Go Jump in the Pool, most of the rest of the recurring characters are introduced, along with all of their stereotypes.
- Before Gordon Korman took into account that he actually potentially created a series, he had written an epilogue at the end, with Mr. Sturgeon stating his thoughts about Bruno and Boots after the events of this book, and with Bruno and Boots having graduated. This epilogue was deleted in later editions of the book. The epilogue contains the first appearance of the idea that Mr. Sturgeon's tuxedo was replaced with a judo suit by Bruno and Boots on Founder's Day. The idea surfaces in The Wizzle War when Sturgeon sympathetically tells an ailing Wizzle that the students had once replaced his tuxedo with a judo suit on Founder's Day.
