= JJ Halo =

Spy fiction books by Juliette Davies

JJ Halo, Super-cool Spyling
- The first book in the series
- JJ Halo, First Mission; JJ Halo, Shaddow Returns; JJ Halo, Time Travel Trouble; JJ Halo, Spy Pet Chaos
- Author: Juliette Davies
- Country: Australia
- Language: English
- Genre: Chapter book, thriller, spy fiction
- Published: 2009 - present
- Media type: Print (paperback)

JJ Halo is a series of four children's literature spy fiction chapter books written by Australian child author Juliette Davies. The first book in the series was written when Davies was only eight years old. The books chronicle the adventures of a young spy, her friends, parents and pets. While the main protagonist shares the same name as the author, the account is not autobiographical but rather the relationship takes the form of an alter ego.

The first two books were initially non-commercially self-published, but were subsequently picked up by a third-party commercial publishing house. All four books are now commercially published and available both online and through physical bookshops.

The books are of "Kids-for-Kids" (K4K) genre—books written by kids, for kids.

== Plot ==
The plot revolves around a normal ten-year-old girl who one day discovers her parents are spies and that she, in turn, is a "spyling" (a young spy). She is introduced to the secret spy organization, "Silggem", which is commanded by the mysterious Director C. Each book involves her being sent on a mission, assisted either by her parents or her friends. Each spyling has a spy pet, who sometimes also helps with missions. The spylings are also provided with many Silggem gadgets such as rocket boots and hoverboards. In early books, the missions involve adult supervision, while in later books the missions are conducted solo and, in some cases, involve rescuing grown-ups. The main character ages by about six months between each book.

== Author ==
The first book in the series was written by the author at the age of eight, for her own entertainment. Because her parents did not allow her to use electronic gadgets to entertain herself in cafes and restaurants, she had taken to writing stories in a notebook. On a family holiday, it was one of these stories that continued to grow and grow in scope, until after several months, it attained a length of 6500 words. The story was subsequently typed up and POD printed for consumption by family and friends.

Enthused by this, encouraged by her school, and captivated by the character, she then went on to write the second book in the series. Both books were given to friends and family, with more than one hundred being given out.

== Editing ==
Although professionally edited, the work stays true to the "K4K" genre by retaining the child's voice. The finished product is grammatically correct with correct punctuation and spelling. Only relatively light editing was required to attain this standard. The books include line-art illustrations by the author, drawn on paper, scanned and contrast-adjusted by the author before final insertion in the manuscript.

== Critical reception ==
The ideal reading age for these books is eight to ten years. Early non-commercial distribution established that children consumed the books with great enthusiasm, even when the capability of the reader was slightly above the level of the writing. Subsequent investigation showed that child readers were particularly enthused because:

- they could "hear" the author was a child, and thus the material was different from other chapter books, and was clearly aimed at them. Put another way, it was written in "kid language", rather than an adult, or an adult feigning kid language
- the notion that a kid could write a book frequently inspired them to pick up a pen and do likewise

Reviewed by Ursula Dubosarsky, the books were rated as Highly Recommended.

Because JJ Halo encouraged non-readers to read, and encouraged readers to write, it was also met with enthusiasm by parents and some educational institutions.

== Publisher ==
Around this time, a new publishing company called ACE Press was being launched. ACE became aware of the works and decided to add them to its initial stable of titles.

ACE Press subsequently launched on 18 September 2010 at a function hosted at Gleebooks in Sydney, Australia, with two JJ Halo books and three other books. The launch was covered by Television Sydney on its Shelf Life program. The author and her best friend performed readings from her book, and she was interviewed.

At this time, the third book in the series was already finished.

Some years later, ACE Press decided to substantially trim its catalog and removed many of its titles, including the JJ Halo series. The books are now available on Amazon. The ISBNs of the original ACE Press editions are: 9780980786415, 9780980786422 and 9780980786439.

== Books ==
=== First Mission ===
JJ halo, Super-cool spyling is the first book in the series where we meet the main character, her parents, the spy organization Silggem. JJ is trained in the use of various gadgets and sent on her first mission, where she meets her new friend, Ava. The mission involves an evil stationery brand that intends to take over the world, and the friends must defeat the stationery brand to save the day.

=== Shaddow Returns ===
The second book in the JJ Halo series

JJ Halo, Shaddow Returns commences with the bad news that Shaddow, another evil brand, has broken free of the Silggem jail and stolen the brain controller gadget.

Director C provides JJ with a collection of cool gadgets and then assigns her to the case. JJ and Ava track Shaddow through a dangerous forest full of carnivorous plants and animals to an alpine environment which tests their snowboarding skills to the limit. After several close shaves, they eventually find the Shaddow HQ where they are able to sneak in. They are unfortunately captured and incarcerated, and discover their parents have become henchmen of the evil Shaddow organization.

It turns out her parents are under the influence of the brain controller, which Ava and JJ manage to overcome through a combination of bravery and happenstance. After breaking a code, the four heroes escape from the HQ and activate a self-destruct mechanism. Upon returning to Silggem there is a huge celebration.

=== Time Travel Trouble ===
The third book in the JJ Halo series

JJ Halo, Time Travel Trouble opens with JJ's parents being thrown down a volcano to their death by the fiendish Mr Gnop. Director C breaks the bad news to JJ, and JJ resigns herself to her new life, but then decides to make unauthorised use of a Time Turner gadget to travel back in time and rescue her parents before they meet their doom.

As always, JJ is issued with a collection of cool new gadgets, including a necklace of figurines that are able to deploy amazing functionality. They teleport to the volcano island where Mr Gnop has his HQ and conduct reconnaissance during which they find a pet which is being badly cared-for, and which they rescue. They continue searching the HQ, and JJ teaches Ava how to scuba dive so they can penetrate through sunken passageways.

They finally find the correct location, and then use the Time Turner to travel through time, first mistakenly traveling a million years into the past, and then mistakenly travel into the future where they encounter a futuristic shop and an amusement park.

They then travel back in time to the correct time and place where JJ's parents were thrown into the volcano to their deaths. The two girls set up a holographic project to disguise their activities, and manage to save the two grown-ups just at the moment they were about to hit the lava. In the process, JJ over-balances and falls towards the lava, but manages to self-rescue using a combination of gadgets and pluckiness.

Joining forces, the two girls and two adults go in pursuit of Mr Gnop, and discover he has two daughters. The daughters turn out to be quite nice, so they rescue the girls while teleporting Mr Gnop to jail. Finally, they return to Silggem HQ where a large celebration ensues.

An epilogue reveals Mr Gnop is not content to languish in jail, but is already plotting his revenge.

=== Spy Pet Chaos ===
Spy Pet Chaos

In Spy Pet Chaos (ISBN 9780987401540), the fourth book of the JJ Halo series, the evil Mr Gnop and Mr Grimm kidnap JJ's spy pet and threaten to destroy the world.

Secret agent JJ Halo must break codes, fly a helicopter, pilot a rocket and avoid asteroids to save the day. But just when it seems like Mr Grimm has been defeated, everything goes seriously wrong and the whole of Silggem depends on rescue from a very unusual agent.

The fourth book has a slightly older reading age than the earlier titles. It was written straight after book three, but there was a delay in publishing due to school activities.
