= You're the One (TV series) =

1998 American sitcom

- Created by: Julia Newton
- Starring: Cynthia Geary; Elon Gold; Leo Burmester; Dori Brenner
- Music by: Jonathan Wolff; Paul Buckley
- Country of origin: United States
- Original language: English
- No. of seasons: 1
- No. of episodes: 7 (5 unaired)

Production
- Executive producer: Julia Newton
- Running time: 30 minutes
- Production companies: Love That Mike Productions; Castle Rock Entertainment

Original release
- Network: The WB
- Release: April 19 – April 26, 1998

You're the One is an American sitcom that was produced by Love That Mike Productions and Castle Rock Entertainment that aired on The WB from April 19 until April 26, 1998.

== Premise ==
A landscape architect from the American South falls in love with a website designer from New York City, despite coming from different backgrounds and cultures.

== Cast ==
- Cynthia Geary as Lindsay Metcalf
- Elon Gold as Mark Weitz
- Leo Burmester as Bo Metcalf
- Dori Brenner as Leonore Weitz
- Julie Dretzin as Robin Eichenbaum-Weitz
- Jayce Bartok as Kip Metcalf
- Troy Winbush as Howard

== Episodes ==
No.	Title	Directed by	Written by	Original release date	Prod. code	Viewers (millions)
1	"Pilot"	Will Mackenzie	Julia Newton	April 19, 1998	180101	2.98
Lindsay and Mark are not looking forward to announcing to their relatives that they have gotten engaged.
2	"Romance"	Unknown	Gail Lerner	April 26, 1998	180107	2.67
Mark forgets the anniversary of a milestone in their relationship.
3	"Fights"	Max Tash	John Wierick	Unaired	180104	N/A
Lindsay is concerned that she and Mark aren't compatible after they have a fight over a movie.
4	"Turf"	Jimmy Hampton	Julia Newton	Unaired	180102	N/A
Lindsay moves in with Mark, but he isn't happy with her decorating.
5	"Secrets"	Max Tash	Bill Canterbury	Unaired	180103	N/A
Lindsay and Mark promises each other to never keep secrets.
6	"Friendships"	Max Tash	Bill Canterbury	Unaired	180105	N/A
Lindsay gets a visit from an old friend and her husband, but Mark isn't pleased with their company.
7	"Money"	Jimmy Hampton	John Wierick	Unaired	180106	N/A
Lindsay and Mark agree to share a bank account. Kip gets thrown out by Bo.
