= Village 1104 =

2010 book by Prateek Arora

- Author: Prateek Arora
- Illustrator: Prateek Arora
- Cover artist: Prateek Arora
- Language: English
- Genre: Fiction
- Publisher: Reviewer's Edition:(self-published by ABC Press); *Market Edition:(not confirmed yet)
- Publication date: March 2010
- Publication place: India
- Media type: Print (Hardcover & Paperback)
- Pages: 147

Village 1104 is a first-person narrative which revolves around a professor, Abhimanyu Shergill, and four children, Sid, Rishabh, Murari and Priya. Prateek, in this book, talks about the various kinds of pressure an Indian student has to go through: parental pressure, peer pressure and gender-biases and focuses on the limitations of the Indian educational system. The book narrates how these four "failures" in the city end up in a village which is too insignificant to even be given a name in the Indian Government directory. The book focuses on the growth of this group as they join forces to change the reality for the village.

== Characters ==
- Abhimanyu Shergill
- Siddhart
- Priya
- Rishabh
- Murari
- Sukhlal ji
- Akriti
- Naresh
- Mr. Bhandari
- Mrs. Bhandari
- Mr. Bhardawaj

== About the author ==
Village 1104 was the debut book by Prateek Arora who wrote it at the age of 16. Via this book, Prateek pulled from his own life experience and channeled his frustrations of the Indian education system. The book received coverage in seven Indian newspapers and referenced by various politicians to highlight the needed shift in an infrastructure-starved, legacy education system failing to serve the Indian youth.
