= Dori Brenner =

American actress (1946–2000)

- Brenner in Cassie & Co., 1982
- Born: Dori Levine; December 16, 1946; Manhattan, New York, U.S.
- Died: September 16, 2000 (aged 53); Los Angeles, California, U.S.
- Education: Yale School of Drama
- Known for: Actress

Dori Brenner (born Dori Levine; December 16, 1946 – September 16, 2000) was an American actress.

== Early life ==
She was born in Manhattan, and went to Sarah Lawrence College and the Yale School of Drama. Her oldest sister was author Ellen Levine. Her other sister, Mada Levine Liebman, was a senior advisor to US Senators Frank Lautenberg and Jon Corzine.

== Career ==
Brenner's first film was Summer Wishes, Winter Dreams. Some other films she appeared in were Altered States, For the Boys, and Next Stop, Greenwich Village.

She appeared on television with regular roles on The Charmings, Ned and Stacey and Seventh Avenue. She had a recurring role as the neighbor on Who's the Boss?

== Personal life ==
Brenner was a close friend of Bette Davis.

== Death ==
Brenner died of complications from cancer in Los Angeles, California. and was buried at Beth David Cemetery.

== Filmography ==
=== Film ===
Year	Title	Role
1972	Scarecrow in a Garden of Cucumbers	
1973	Summer Wishes, Winter Dreams	Anna
1975	The Other Side of the Mountain	Cookie
1976	Next Stop, Greenwich Village	Connie
1976	I Want to Keep My Baby!	Renee DeReda
1976	Sad and Lonely Sundays	Sandy
1980	Altered States	Sylvia Rosenberg
1984	The Oasis	Jill
1985	I Dream of Jeannie... Fifteen Years Later	Dori Green
1987	Baby Boom	Park Mom
1991	For the Boys	Loretta
1996	Infinity	Tutti Feynman
2000	Sunset Strip	Doctor

=== Television ===
Year	Title	Role	Notes
1974	Kojak	Miss Rosenberg	S1.E22 - "The Only Way Out"
1975	All Together Now	Nicki	ABC Movie of the Week
1976	Ellery Queen	Laura Schramm	S1.E19 - "The Adventure of the Tyrant of Tin Pan Alley"
1976	The Oath: The Sad and Lonely Sundays	Sandy	Anthology series
1976-77	Delvecchio	Jean Lazarus	2 episodes
1977	Seventh Avenue	Rhoda Gold Blackman	3 episodes
1978	What Really Happened to the Class of '65?	Nan	S1.E12 - "Class Renegade"
1978	The Love Boat	Wendy Bradley	Episodes: Too Hot to Handle/Family Reunion/ Cinderella Story
1981	Hill Street Blues	Luana Belker	S2.E7 - "Chipped Beef"
1981	Aloha Paradise		2 episodes
1981	Trapper John, M.D.	Martha Bennett	S2.E12 - "Finders Keepers"
1982	Cassie & Co.	Meryl Foxx	13 episodes
1982	CBS Schoolbreak Special	Cindy Chalmers	S4.E2 - "Journey to Survival"
1985	Who's the Boss?	Wendy Wittner	5 episodes
1985	Cagney & Lacey	Emily Johnson	S5.E6 - "The Clinic"
1986	The Paper Chase	Mrs. Dellafield (Law Registrar)	S4.E3 - "Honor"
1987	Night Court	Arlene Huebner	S4.E13 - "Baby Talk"
1987-88	The Charmings	Sally Miller	Main cast - 21 episodes
1988	Falcon Crest	Penny Calloway	2 episodes
1990	Mancuso, F.B.I.		2 episodes
1991	Equal Justice	Mary Ann	S2.E1 - "Sleeping with the Enemy"
1991	Sons and Daughters	Sheila Albright	S1.E9 - "Throw Momma from the Terrain"
1991	Sisters	Maggie D'Amato	2 episodes
1991	The Sunset Gang	Cynthia	S10.E7 - "The Home" (written by Warren Adler)
1993	Wings	Doris	S4.E15 - "The Gift: Part 1"
1995-97	Ned and Stacey	Ellen Colbert	12 episodes
1996	The Steve Harvey Show	Dr. Langer	S1.E3 - "Mr. Hightower's Opus"
1998	You're the One	Leonore Weitz	3 episodes
1998	Party of Five	Nurse Cactis	S5.E6 - Episode: "Forgive and/or Forget"
2000	Bull	Esther Decker	S1.E9 - "The Quick Hit"

== Award nominations ==
Year	Award	Category	Title of work
1977	Primetime Emmy Award	Outstanding Lead Actress in a Limited Series or Movie	Seventh Avenue
