= Palle Huld =

Danish actor

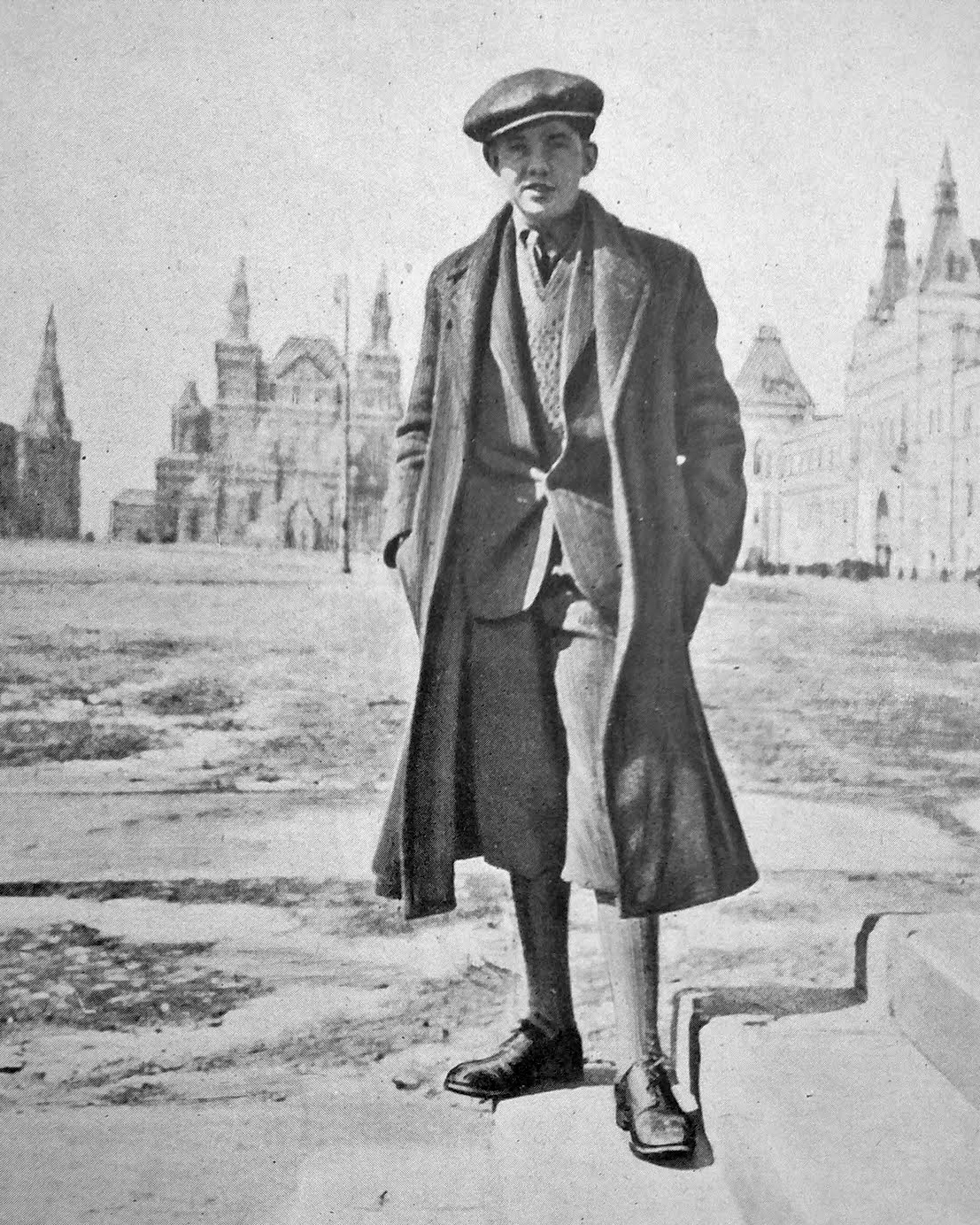
- Red Square, Moscow, 1928
- Born: 2 August 1912; Hellerup, Denmark
- Died: 26 November 2010 (aged 98); Copenhagen, Denmark
- Occupations: Actor, writer
- Years active: 1933–2000

Palle Huld (2 August 1912 – 26 November 2010) was a Danish Boy Scout, film actor and writer. He appeared in 40 films between 1933 and 2000. He was born in Hellerup in Denmark. His journey around the world at the age of 15 in 1928 reportedly inspired Hergé to create Tintin.

== Around the World in 44 Days ==
The Danish newspaper Politiken held a competition in honour of Jules Verne which was open only to teenage boys. The winner would be assisted in a challenge to circumnavigate the world within 46 days unaccompanied. They were allowed to use all forms of transport apart from aviation. There were several hundred applications for this competition. Huld was 15 at the time and working in a car dealership as a clerk. Huld left on his voyage on 1 March 1928, a journey that took him through the following countries: the United Kingdom, Canada, Japan, Korea, China (Manchuria), the Soviet Union, Poland and Germany. In 44 days he made it back to Copenhagen to the cheers of a crowd of 20,000. That year Huld published a book about his trip, A Boy Scout Around the World. Shortly after his homecoming he made an additional journey (now mostly dressed in his scout uniform) to Sweden, Britain (where he met Baden-Powell) and France, where he laid a bouquet of flowers at the grave of Jules Verne.

== Selected filmography ==
- Poeten og Lillemor i forårshumør (1961)
- Der brænder en ild (1962)
- Kampen om Næsbygård (1964)
- School for Suicide (1964)
- Tine (1964)
- Me and My Kid Brother (1968)
- Mig og min lillebror og storsmuglerne (1968)
- Olsen-banden ser rødt (1976)

== Books ==
- Jorden rundt i 44 dage (1929)
- Så vidt jeg erindrer (1992)
