= A Boy Scout Around the World =

Book by Palle Huld

- Danish cover (2012 reprint)
- Author: Palle Huld
- Translator: Eleanor Hard
- Cover artist: Axel Mathiesen
- Language: Danish (translated to 11 languages)
- Genre: Travel book
- Published: 1928
- Publication place: Denmark
- English publication date: 1929
- Media type: Print
- Pages: 178 (Danish original)

A Boy Scout Around the World (Danish: Jorden Rundt i 44 dage, literally: Around the World in 44 Days) is a travel description published in October 1928 and written by Danish Boy Scout and later actor Palle Huld at the age of 15, following his travel around the world in spring 1928.

His trip was sponsored by a Danish newspaper and made on the occasion of the 100th birthday of Jules Verne, a French author of adventure and science fiction. (Note: The newspaper had his grandson Jean Jules Verne write a foreword for the book.) Palle Huld was chosen after having answered a newspaper advertisement; applicants had to be boys, (Note: Some girls did apply.) 15 years old, able to manage in English and German and of good health. Like the characters in Jules Verne’s 1873 novel Around the World in 80 days (Note: The book was published in 1873) he was only allowed to travel by land and sea, not by air. The travel (on first class) went from Denmark to Great Britain, across the Atlantic Ocean to Canada. From the American west coast he continued to Japan, China, Soviet Union, Poland, Germany and back to Denmark. He had to travel alone but was helped along the way by reporters of the newspaper, members of Danish embassies and local Boy Scouts. The travel was followed by not only Danish newspapers but newspapers around the world and on his return to Copenhagen he was met by a crowd of 20,000 people.

He travelled towards the west, which was the fastest but also the opposite direction of the one taken in Around the World in 80 Days. Unlike the novel, he had little problems in reaching departures. In western Canada he met First Nations, who promised not to take his scalp, though red scalps were at a premium. He was impressed by the luxury of the Pacific Ocean liner; its restaurant was the size of the hall of a castle in his opinion and onboard he could play tennis and water polo. Around the world he was met by the press and he got increasingly better at handling them as the travel progressed. One question that gave him problems was about his taste in women; he told the journalist that he was too young to think of it. He was met with generosity, many accessories for his travel such as shoes and a camera were given to him for free. He declined one offer: on board the Pacific liner he would not let a young American woman darn his socks. Later, when he visited the famous Japanese Admiral Togo, he had to take his shoes off and thereby reveal the holes in his socks, which made him regret not taking the offer. Nevertheless, Japan was his favorite country since he found everything pretty.

After his journey he was invited to, among others, Great Britain where he met with Robert Baden-Powell founder of the boy Scout Movement and France where he laid flowers on the grave of Jules Verne.

== Legacy ==
The book was translated into 11 languages and is said to have inspired Belgian cartoonist Hergé to create the Tintin comics. The theory that Palle Huld should be the inspiration for Tintin goes back to 1988 where it was proposed by Tintin collector Stéphane Steeman in an article titled Les Amis d’Hergé. He found striking resemblances between the pictures of Palle Huld's memoires and Hergé's early drawings of Tintin. He was backed by Philippe Goddin, who found it likely that especially Tintin's staged reception at Brussels' north station in the guise of a 15-year-old Belgian Boy Scout, following the 1930 publication of Tintin in the Land of the Soviets, was inspired by Palle Huld's reception in Copenhagen. It has not been possible to verify these claims by the papers left by Hergé, and Palle Huld himself had not heard of them when interviewed in 2009 on Tintin's 80 birthday.

Palle Huld died in 2010 at the age of 98 years. On what would have been his 100th birthday in 2012 the Danish version was reprinted in his honor.

== Language editions ==
- Czech: Kolem světa za 44 dni... Praha, 1929. 172 pages
- Danish (original): Jorden rundt i 44 Dage af Palle, Hasselbalch, 1928, 178 pages, preface by Jean Jules-Verne, cover: Axel Mathiesen. Reprint: 2. August 2012, Peoples Press Jr., added preface by Troels Kløvedal, 161 pages.
- Dutch: Een reis om de wereld in 44 dagen. Translated by Mary Schlüter-Harrix. Amsterdam, ca. 1928. 170 pages
- English (USA): A Boy Scout Round the World. Translated by Eleanor Hard. Coward-McCann Inc., New York 1929. Preface by Hawthorne Daniel. 197 pages. Cover: Axel Mathiesen. (Also published in Great Britain).
- Finnish: Pallen Matka maailman ympäri 44 päivässä. Poorvoo (WSOY) /Borgå, 1929. 212 pages
- French: Le tour du monde en 44 jours. Translation: Elna Cornet. Hachette, Paris, 1928. 165 pages, preface by Jean Jules-Verne.
- German: Mit fünfzehn Jahren um die Welt in 44 Tagen, Seemann, Leipzig, 1928.
- Spanish: La vuelta al mundo en 44 días. B. Bauza, Barcelona 1930
- Swedish: Jorden runt på 44 dagar av Palle Åhlen & Åkerlunds Förlag, Stockholm, 1928. Translation: Signe von Vegesack. 196 pages.

Also translated to: Hungarian, Italian and Japanese.

== See also ==
- Similar events inspired by Around the World in 80 Days
- North, a 1994 film with a poster of a boy walking on a globe with a suitcase.

== Bibliography ==
- Goddin, Philippe (2008). The Art of Hergé, Inventor of Tintin: Volume I, 1907–1937. Michael Farr (translator). San Francisco: Last Gasp. ISBN 978-0-86719-706-8.
- Peeters, Benoît (2012). Hergé, Son of Tintin. JHU Press. ISBN 978-1-4214-0454-7.
- "Tintin au pays des soviets". Filme Cărţi (in Romanian). 14 January 2011. Archived from the original on 2013-07-28.
