= What's Left of Me (novel) =

2012 novel by Kat Zhang

- Author: Kat Zhang
- Language: English
- Series: The Hybrid Chronicles
- Genre: science fiction, drama, young adult fiction
- Published: 18 September 2012
- Pages: 343
- ISBN: 9780062114877
- Followed by: Once We Were

What's Left of Me is a novel by author Kat Zhang. The book is the first of a trilogy, The Hybrid Chronicles.

== Plot ==
The Hybrid Chronicles books are set in an alternate universe society in which at birth every body possesses two 'souls', or human identities. One of these identities is supposed to fade away with age. Those who retain both souls are labelled 'hybrids' and are ostracized from normal society. The series' protagonists, Addie and Eva, inhabit the same body. The girls hide the presence of Eva, the recessive soul, for fear of what might happen if they were ever discovered. Over the course of the trilogy, the girls are at first institutionalized for their hybrid nature, then join a resistance force for hybrid rights.

== Reception ==
The Hybrid Chronicles has received generally positive reception from several websites.

The first in the trilogy, What's Left of Me, was chosen as a 2012 BEA Buzz book and given a starred review on Publishers Weekly.
