= Kat Zhang =

American novelist

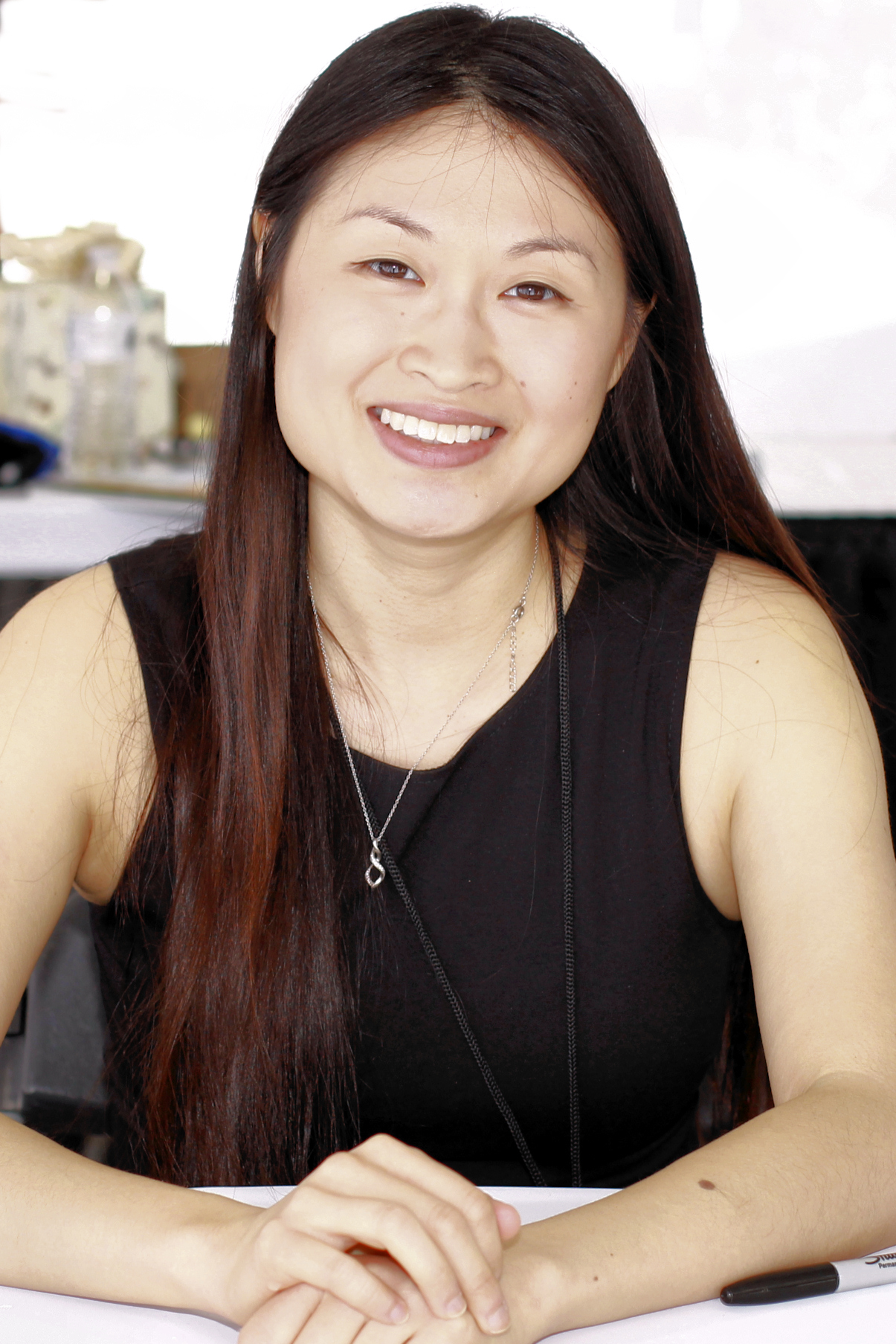
- Zhang at the 2019 Texas Book Festival
- Born: April 1, 1991 (age 35)
- Education: Vanderbilt University
- Writing career
- Genres: Young Adult, Middle Grade
- Notable works: Hybrid Chronicles, The Emperor's Riddle
- Notable awards: Freeman Award Honorable Mention
- Website: katzhang.com

Kat Zhang (born 1 April 1991) is an American award-winning author of young adult and middle grade literature. She has also written two picture books, Amy Wu and the Perfect Bao and Amy Wu and the Patchwork Dragon. Her first trilogy, The Hybrid Chronicles, was published by HarperCollins in the United States. According to WorldCat, the series is held in 2,545 libraries, and has been translated into Chinese, German, Spanish, French, Portuguese, Polish and Italian. The first volume, What's Left of Me, was published in 2012; the second volume, Once We Were, was published in 2013; and the third and final volume, Echoes of Us, was published in 2014.

== Personal life ==
Zhang was born in Texas to immigrants from China. Her father was from Wuhan, and her mother from Fuzhou.

Zhang graduated from Vanderbilt University.

== Writings ==
=== Young Adult novels ===
==== Hybrid Chronicles trilogy ====
- What's Left of Me (2012)
- Once We Were (2013)
- Echoes of Us (2014)

=== Middle Grade novels ===
- The Emperor's Riddle (2017)
- The Memory of Forgotten Things (2018)

=== Picture Books ===
- Amy Wu and the Perfect Bao (2019)
- Amy Wu and the Patchwork Dragon (2020)
- Amy Wu and the Warm Welcome (2022)
- Amy Wu and the Ribbon Dance (2023)

== The Hybrid Chronicles ==
Hybrid Chronicles series is set in an alternate universe society in which every body possesses two 'souls' or human identities at birth. One of these identities, termed the "recessive soul," is supposed to fade away with age. Those who retain both souls are labelled 'hybrids' and are ostracized from normal society. The series' protagonists are Addie and Eva, the dominant and recessive souls respectively, who inhabit the same body. The girls hide the presence of Eva, who has lost control of their shared body but never completely faded, for fear of what might happen if they were ever discovered. Over the course of the trilogy, the girls are at first institutionalized for their hybrid nature, then join a resistance force for hybrid rights.

The Hybrid Chronicles Trilogy includes What's Left of Me (2012), Once We Were (2013), and Echoes of Us (2014).

== Middle grade novels ==
The Emperor's Riddle, Zhang's first Middle Grade novel, is set in Fuzhou, China. It describes the adventures of a Chinese-American girl as she searches for an ancient, Ming dynasty treasure. The book details the legends involving the assassination of Chinese emperor Zhu Yunwen, the second emperor of the Ming dynasty, and touches on the events of the Chinese cultural revolution.

Zhang's second middle grade novel, The Memory of Forgotten Things, is a return to science fiction. The twelve-year-old protagonist, Sophia Wallace, has memories of her deceased mother that don't make sense, memories that take place after her mother's death. She believes that an upcoming solar eclipse will allow her to cross over into a parallel world where her mother never died.

== Reception ==
The Hybrid Chronicles has received generally positive reception from several websites. The first in the trilogy, What's Left of Me, was chosen as a 2012 BEA Buzz book and given a starred review on Publishers Weekly. It was positively reviewed in The New York Times.

In 2017, The Emperor's Riddle won an honorable mention for the NCTA's Freeman Award. It also won a Parent's Choice Award.

The Memory of Forgotten Things was selected as a Bank Street Best Children's Book of the Year.

The first Amy Wu picture book, Amy Wu and the Perfect Bao, received a starred review from Kirkus, and was a Kirkus Best Picture Book of 2019. It was also chosen as a First and Best 2019 book by the Toronto Public Library.
