= The Prophecy of the Stones =

Children's novel by Flavia Bujor

- First edition (French)
- Author: Flavia Bujor
- Original title: La prophétie des pierres
- Translator: Linda Coverdale
- Language: French
- Genre: Fantastique
- Publisher: Miramax Books
- Publication date: 2002
- Publication place: France
- English publication date: 2004
- Media type: Print (Hardback & Paperback)
- ISBN: 0-7868-1835-2
- OCLC: 53901489
- LC Class: PZ7.B911145 Pr 2004

The Prophecy of The Stones (published in the UK as The Prophecy of the Gems; French: La prophétie des pierres) is a children's novel written by the French author Flavia Bujor. Bujor was 13 years old when she wrote the novel, which has been translated into 23 languages.

== Plot summary ==
The principal story follows three protagonists, named Jade, Opal, and Amber after the gemstones associated with them at birth, striving to overthrow the 'Council of Twelve' and 'Army of Darkness' that oppress the story's world. The trio first meet on their 14th birthdays, at the behest of their guardians, and discover a cipher, to investigate which they visit Jean Losserand, an explorer imprisoned for dissent, who directs them to the oracle 'Oonagh'. To reach her, the protagonists and their ally 'Adrien de Rivebel' lead an exodus into the realm 'Fairytale', where humans coexist with super-humans outside the council's rule. During the exodus, Opal is wounded, but is saved at the house of Adrien's friend, Owen d'Yrdahl. Following Opal's recovery, she accompanies Jade and Amber to Oonagh, who reveals that on the coming summer solstice will be a battle between the Army of Darkness and the Army of Light, and that they therefore must persuade Death to end her strike. Having done so, they rejoin the Army of Light, where Amber identifies its leader, called 'Elyador' ('Chosen One' in the story's fictional language), at his own arrival. Thereafter the three protagonists observe the battle alongside their principal antagonist, the Thirteenth Councillor. Upon perceiving the Army of Light in danger, the protagonists leap from the Councillor's tower, provoking a 'golden rain' to inspire the Army of Light, which thereupon destroys the Army of Darkness. This done, the victorious leaders discover a 'Seed of hope', which they plant to ensure their victory.

A second storyline follows Elyador himself, amnesiac and itinerant, until his reaching the Army of Light. A third depicts the thoughts of 'Joa', a child dying of an unidentified disease, who observes the three protagonists in a series of hallucinations. Inspired by them, she summons an estranged friend (identified with Elyador) to convey a final message: "My dreams gave life back to me. Now I must give dreams back to life".

== Reception ==
The Prophecy of the Stones was a bestseller in over twenty countries around the world; but many readers attributed the novel's fame to Bujor's age and not her talent at writing, and criticized her for giving her characters Mary Sue qualities.

Chicago Sun-Times reviewer Elizabeth Hand gave the book a negative review, writing that it "is a crass, cynical attempt to cash in on a writer's youth and photogenic qualities". Nora Krug wrote in The New York Times, "Her peer audience would do well to stick with masters of the genre rather than what reads like a homework project gone much too far." Publishers Weekly said, "The prose and the plotting, exceptional for a teenager, may seem mannered or conventional by other standards (heroines struggling with their personal identity, a "chosen one," an epic good versus evil showdown, etc.)."

In the School Library Journal, Bruce Anne Shook and Phyllis Levy Mandell wrote, "Dialogue is stiff. ... While the story is a definite accomplishment for one so young, it is not a polished or mature work of fiction." Ilene Cooper said in Booklist, "The characters are one-dimensional, the plot derivative, and the writing sluggish. So why purchase this? Because of the buzz, which will be heard at libraries, and perhaps for the inspiration it can give young writers. If she can get published ..." Kirkus Reviews had a negative opinion of the book, stating, "Bujor tells of emotion, identity, and character growth without showing them, leaving characters generic even as their feelings ricochet implausibly. Meanwhile, possibly in another time, a hospitalized girl struggles for life--but even this cryptic frame fails to satisfy in the end. Without substance."
