= Norman Bogner =

American author (1935–2022)

- Born: November 13, 1935; New York City, U.S.
- Died: December 12, 2022 (aged 87)
- Education: Syracuse University (BA)
- Occupation: Novelist
- Writing career
- Period: 1961–2022
- Genres: Crime fiction, thriller, family drama
- Website: www.normanbogner.com

Norman Bogner (November 13, 1935 – December 12, 2022) was a New York Times Bestselling- author whose range of work has included several novels such as Seventh Avenue, The Deadliest Art, To Die in Provence and The Madonna Complex, as well as stage plays, and movie and television scripts. His first novel, In Spells No Longer Bound, was published in 1961 and his most recent novel, 99 Sycamore Place, published in 2009. By 2001, his books, which explore drama and intrigue as they play out between family members and lovers, had sold over 25 million copies worldwide.

== Biography ==
=== Early years ===
Norman Bogner was born November 13, 1935, in Brooklyn, New York, to Manny Bogner and Rose Schwartz. Bogner grew up in Brooklyn, New York, his parents divorced in 1942. His mother, Rose, owned a store that sold ladies' wear, while his father owned a small chain of such shops.

=== Career ===
In 1953, Bogner began his college career attending the University of Alabama through 1954, and then transferring to Syracuse University where he graduated with a B.A. in English and Humanities (cum laude) in 1957. Bogner went on to do graduate work in English at New York University and the New School for Social Research in 1958–59.

Turning down several teaching fellowships, Bogner chose to go to Europe to explore in person what he had learned in school. According to Bogner, after several trips with his father across the United States, he knew traveling in Europe was what he needed to learn more about the real people he was going to write about. While his mother encouraged him in this decision, his father basically turned his back on Bogner and refused to offer any financial or emotional support, if Bogner chose to be a writer and traveled in Europe, rather than staying in the United States to further his career as a lawyer, doctor, or professor. To earn the money he needed to follow through on his plan, this meant Bogner went back to doing the kitchen work he'd done at resorts and restaurants in the Catskill Mountains and at Cape Cod during the summers while in school. At this point, he worked “on the line” as a chef and saucier.

==== England/Europe ====
Starting his tour in Barcelona, Bogner began his European education learning to speak a language that he knew how to read, yet had never used in any real setting. After finding friends to look out for him, a place to live, and settling in, he needed to find work to support himself. He ended up spending his mornings writing and his afternoons teaching English to prostitutes in a brothel where he had been befriended by some madams.

By 1961, Bogner's first novel, In Spells No Longer Bound, was published by noted British publishers Jonathan Cape. As noted by Gale's Literature Resource Library: “According to Susan R. Cox in the Fort Lauderdale Sun-Sentinel, he completed the novel in Spain and then got a job in a department store in England, 'before leaving his precious manuscript in the front office of the only London publishing house he'd heard of.'”

When his book was published, he was asked to stay on at Jonathan Cape as an editor from 1960 to 1961, and editorial manager from 1962 to 1964. Among the authors whose works he edited were: John Fowles, Edna O'Brien, Ronald Harwood, Arnold Wesker, C. Day Lewis, and A. W. Lawrence. In addition, he also edited Derek Walcott's first volume of poetry, two novels by Claude Simon, and Alan Paton's book of short stories, Debbie Go Home.

From 1964 to 1966, Bogner was story editor for “Armchair Theatre” at ABC Television Ltd. (later merged into Thames Television) in Teddington, England. While there, Bogner was responsible for over 100 hours of network television. He also discovered and commissioned a number of then-unknown writers, including Tom Stoppard, Alan Ayckbourn, Charles Wood, and Dennis Potter. It was also at this time that he wrote The Waiters, a stage play, directed and produced by Giles Havergal, and The Match, a television play directed by Don Leaver for ABC-TV. In 1967, he wrote the screenplay for Privilege.

Bogner's breakthrough novel, the first to hit the bestsellers lists was Divorce, in 1966. A publisher in the United States picked it up, renamed it Seventh Avenue and published it in 1967 where it soon made the New York Times Bestseller's list and was eventually made into a television miniseries in 1977. With the success of Seventh Avenue, Norman Bogner was able to concentrate on writing full time.

Other works Bogner published while living in England include: Spanish Fever, Longmans, Green (London), 1963, reprinted, New English Library (London), 1978; The Madonna Complex, Coward, 1968, revised edition, Forge (New York), 2000; Making Love, W. H. Allen (London), 1971; and The Hunting Animal, Morrow (New York City), 1974.

==== United States ====
By 1975, Norman Bogner had returned to the United States, making his home in Los Angeles, California. He continued writing, publishing Snowman (Dell, New York, 1978) and Arena (Delacorte, New York, 1979). In 1981, he published California Dreamers saying, “I’d been wanting to write a book about Southern California … It’s taken me six years to get a fix on the area, to understand the way things work here.”

For the next 15 years Bogner worked as a script doctor in the film and television industry, not coming out with another novel until 1998 when he published To Die in Provence (Forge, New York, 1998). This was soon followed by Honor Thy Wife (Forge, New York 1999), and then The Deadliest Art in 2001, a sequel to To Die in Provence.

Bogner's last novel was 99 Sycamore Place (Brick Tower, New York, 2009).

=== Family ===
On November 15, 1959, Norman Bogner married Felice Gordon (fashion designer, writer, publicist). They had three children: Jonathan Scott, Nicholas Sean and Alexander Evan. Norman and Felice Bogner were divorced April 1, 1975. On June 6, 1975, Norman Bogner married Lorraine Latham. They were married for 14 years before divorcing in 1989. In 1991, he married Bettye J. McCartt (talent and literary agent), who died August 9, 2013.

== Bibliography ==
=== Books ===
Series with Michel Danton

- To Die in Provence (1998)
- The Deadliest Art (2001)

Stand alone novels

- In Spells No Longer Bound (1961)
- Spanish Fever (1963)
- Divorce (1966)
- Seventh Avenue (1967)
- The Madonna Complex (1968)
- Making Love (1971)
- The Hunting Animal (1974)
- Snowman (1978)
- Arena (1979)
- California Dreamers (1981)
- Honour Thy Wife (1999)
- 99 Sycamore Place (2009)

==== Various book descriptions ====
The Madonna Complex (1968) is the story of an obsessed billionaire and the woman he wishes to possess. Teddy Franklin who is accustomed to getting his way in business, meets United Nations translator Barbara Hickman and finds out that he can't have everything he desires. The climax occurs in the Canadian wilderness where Teddy must rely on Barbara to save him from the police.

California Dreamers (1981) follows the intertwining love lives of three ambitious women who live in Los Angeles. One is a buyer at a department store, one the daughter of a real estate developer, and the third is an aspiring actress.

To Die in Provence (1998), is a thriller about a psychotic serial killer who is terrorizing the French countryside. French police officer, Michel Danton begins to suspect an American ex-porn star and his wealthy girlfriend.

Honor Thy Wife (1999) is the story of a lawyer, Terry Brett, and how he deals with the return of a lost love, Allison Desmond, who brings along a son Brett never knew he had. Her return brings up conflict between this past family and his current one, as he tries to remain true to both families.

The Deadliest Art (2001) follows Michel Danton once again as he tries to track down someone who is tattooing young teenage girls, willing or not.

99 Sycamore Place (2009) is the story of Rebecca Benjamin as she attempts to track down a neo-Nazi group who murdered her sister right before her sister's wedding. Rebecca gives up her career as a concert pianist, striking a bargain with Douglas Horne, a former lion hunter, to work together to solve the crime.

=== Scripts ===
- Privilege (1967)
- "Armchair Theatre" (1 episode- The Match, 1966)
- "Emerald Soup" (1963) TV series (story editor)
- A Cold Peace (1965) TV episode (script editor)
- The Paraffin Season (1965) TV episode (script editor)
- I Took My Little World Away (1965) TV episode (script editor)
- The Keys of the Cafe (1965) TV episode (story editor)
- "Armchair Mystery Theatre" (script editor) (2 episodes, 1965)
- The Lodger (1965) TV episode (script editor)
- Man and Mirror (1965) TV episode (script editor)

=== Plays ===
- Boys and Girls Come out to Play
- The Waiters
- The Man from Esher
