= Steven Keats =

American actor (1945–1994)

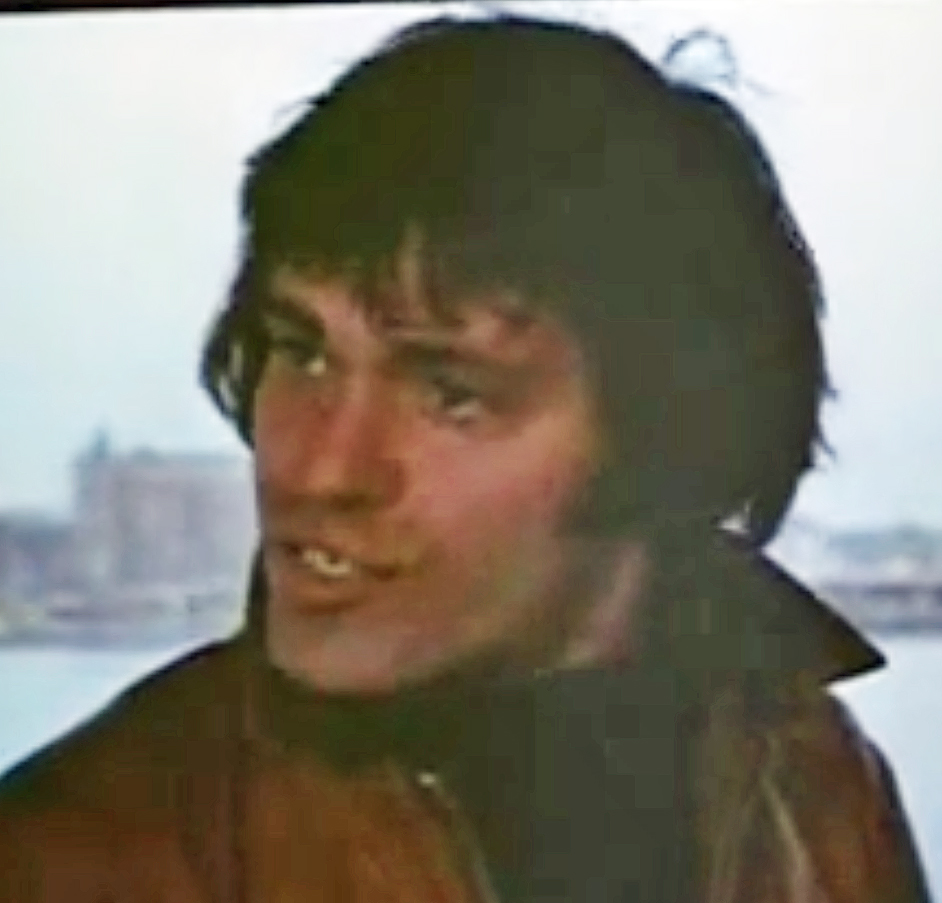
- Keats in trailer for The Friends of Eddie Coyle (1973)
- Born: Steven Paul Keitz; February 6, 1945; New York City, U.S.
- Died: May 8, 1994 (aged 49); New York City, U.S.
- Occupation: Actor
- Years active: 1970–1994
- Children: 2

Steven Keats (born Steven Paul Keitz; February 6, 1945 – May 8, 1994) was an American actor who appeared in such films as Death Wish (as Charles Bronson's character's son-in-law), Black Sunday, Hester Street and the Chuck Norris thriller Silent Rage.

== Early life and education ==
Keats was born in the Bronx to Francis (née Rebold) and Daniel David Keitz. His father was born in Copenhagen, Denmark to Polish Jewish parents from Warsaw. His mother was born in New York, also to a Polish Jewish family. When Keats was a child, his father was the proprietor of a camera store and the family lived on Bryant Avenue in the South Bronx.

He grew up in Canarsie, Brooklyn, New York. At the time of his graduation from Thomas Jefferson High School in 1962, he lived in Bay View Houses, a public housing project. After serving a tour of duty in Vietnam with the United States Air Force from 1965 to 1966, Keats attended the Yale School of Drama from 1969 to 1970. He is the father of photographer and actor Thatcher Keats and of Shane Keats.

== Career ==
Keats debuted on Broadway in the second cast of Oh! Calcutta! and appeared in over 80 films and TV shows. He was nominated for an Emmy Award in 1977 for his role as the ruthless, Great Depression-era entrepreneur Jay Blackman, who clawed his way to the top of the "rag trade", or clothing business, in the 1977 miniseries Seventh Avenue. He also portrayed Thomas Edison on the brink of inventing the electric light bulb in the science fiction TV series Voyagers!.

His film career included roles in The Friends of Eddie Coyle (1973), Death Wish (1974), The Gambler (1974), The Gumball Rally (1976), The Last Dinosaur (1977), Black Sunday (1977), The Ivory Ape (1980), Hangar 18 (1980), Silent Rage (1982), Turk 182 (1985), Badge of the Assassin (1985), and the 1982 TV movie of the Norman Mailer book The Executioner's Song.

Keats appeared in the 1975 film Hester Street. Set on New York City's Lower East Side of the 1890s, Keats played Jake Podkovnik (late of Russia), an assimilated "Amerikaner". He played a deranged bomber in the 1974 Kojak episode "Therapy in Dynamite", and guest-starred on an episode of The A-Team, "Harder Than It Looks". He played Bobby Nelson in The Streets of San Francisco season 3 episode "One Chance to Live". He played Ed McClain on Another World and guest-starred as Alf Gresham on All My Children. In 1983 he appeared in the first episode of Automan as Collins. In 1987, in the final season of Hill Street Blues, he played Detective Penzickis. Additional roles included one in Miami Vice in 1987 with "Contempt in Court". He also played TV reporter Jake Baron on the April 6, 1990 episode of MacGyver, titled "Rush to Judgement".

== Death ==
Keats was found dead in his Manhattan apartment on May 8, 1994. His son said that he died by suicide.

== Filmography ==
| Year | Title | Role | Notes |
|---|---|---|---|
| 1973 | The Friends of Eddie Coyle | Jackie Brown | |
| 1974 | Death Wish | Jack Toby | |
| 1974 | The Gambler | Howie | |
| 1975 | Hester Street | Jake | |
| 1975 | The Dream Makers | Barry | |
| 1976 | Sky Riders | Rudy | |
| 1976 | The Gumball Rally | Kandinsky - Dodge Team | |
| 1977 | The Last Dinosaur | Chuck Wade | |
| 1977 | Black Sunday | Robert Moshevsky | |
| 1978 | Zuma Beach | Jerry McCabe | TV movie |
| 1980 | The American Success Company | Rick Duprez | |
| 1980 | Hangar 18 | Paul Bannister | |
| 1982 | Silent Rage | Dr. Philip Spires | |
| 1985 | Turk 182 | Jockamo | |
| 1985 | Badge of the Assassin | Harold Skelton, Defense Attorney | |
| 1990 | The Spring | Mark | |
| 1990 | Eternity | Tax Collector / Harold | |
| 1991 | Shadows and Fog | Hacker's Vigilante #3 (uncredited) | |
