= Taylor Caldwell =

American novelist (1900–1985)

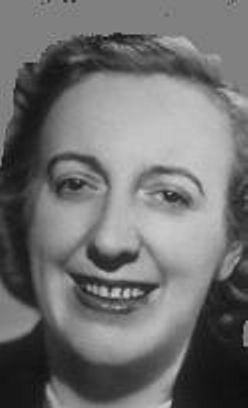
- Born: Janet Miriam Caldwell; September 7, 1900; Manchester, England
- Died: August 30, 1985 (aged 84); Greenwich, Connecticut, U.S.
- Education: University at Buffalo
- Occupation: Novelist
- Spouse(s): William F. Combs (1919-1931; divorced); 1 child Marcus Reback (1931-1970; his death); 1 child William Everett Stancell (1972-1973; union dissolved); William Robert Prestie (1978-1985; her death)
- Writing career
- Pen name: Marcus Holland, Max Reiner, J. Miriam Reback
- Genres: Historical and religious fiction
- Notable work: Dynasty of Death

Janet Miriam Caldwell (September 7, 1900 – August 30, 1985) was a British-born American novelist and prolific author of popular fiction under the pen names Taylor Caldwell, Marcus Holland and Max Reiner. She was also known by a variation of her married name, J. Miriam Reback.

In her fiction, she often used real historical events or persons. Taylor Caldwell's best-known works include Dynasty of Death, Dear and Glorious Physician (about Saint Luke), Ceremony of the Innocent, Pillar of Iron (about Cicero), The Earth is the Lord's (about Genghis Khan) and Captains and the Kings. Her last major novel, Answer As a Man, appeared in 1980.

== Biography ==
Janet Miriam Caldwell was born in Manchester, England, into a family of Scottish background. Her family descended from the Scottish clan of MacGregor of which the Taylors are a subsidiary clan. At the age of six, she won a medal for an essay on Charles Dickens.

In 1907, she emigrated to the United States with her parents, Arthur Frank Caldwell and Annie (née Marks) Caldwell, and her younger brother. Her father died shortly after the move, and the family struggled. At the age of eight she started to write stories, and wrote her first novel, The Romance of Atlantis, at the age of twelve (although it remained unpublished until 1975). She continued to write prolifically, however, despite ill health.

In 1918–19, she served in the United States Navy Reserve. In 1919, she married William F. Combs. In 1920, they had a daughter, Mary Margaret (known as "Peggy"). From 1923 to 1924, Caldwell worked as a court reporter in the New York State Department of Labor in Buffalo, New York. In 1924, she went to work for the United States Department of Justice, as a secretary for the Board of Special Inquiry (an immigration tribunal) in Buffalo.

In 1931, she graduated from the University of Buffalo. She and Combs divorced in 1931. Caldwell then married her second husband, Marcus Reback, who worked for the U.S. Immigration and Naturalization Service. She had a second child with Reback, a daughter Judith Ann, in 1932. The Rebacks were married for 40 years, until his death in 1970.

In 1934, she began to work on the novel Dynasty of Death, which she and Reback completed in collaboration. It was published in 1938 and became a best-seller. "Taylor Caldwell" was presumed to be a man, and there was some public stir when the author was revealed to be a woman. Over the next 43 years, she published 42 more novels, many of them best-sellers. For instance, This Side of Innocence was the biggest fiction seller of 1946, spending more than six months on the New York Times Fiction Best Seller list, including nine weeks at #1. In 1947, according to Time, her husband Marcus Reback discarded and burned the manuscripts of 140 unpublished novels.

Her published works sold an estimated 30 million copies. She became wealthy, traveling to Europe and elsewhere, although she still lived near Buffalo.

Her books were big sellers right up to the end of her career. In 1979, she signed a two-novel deal for $3.9 million.

During her career as a writer, she received several awards:

- The National League of American Pen Women gold medal (1948)
- The Buffalo Evening News Award (1949)
- The Grand Prix Chatvain (1950)

She was an outspoken conservative and for a time wrote for the John Birch Society's monthly journal American Opinion and even associated with the antisemitic Liberty Lobby. Caldwell was even involved in the founding of the New York Conservative Party.

Her memoir, On Growing Up Tough, appeared in 1971, consisting of many edited-down articles from American Opinion. Around 1970, she became interested in reincarnation. She had become friends with well-known occultist author Jess Stearn, who suggested that the vivid detail in her many historical novels was actually subconscious recollection of previous lives. She agreed to be hypnotized and undergo "past life regression" to disprove reincarnation. However, according to Stearn's book, The Search for a Soul – Taylor Caldwell's Psychic Lives (1973), Caldwell instead began to recall her own past lives – eleven in all, including one on the "lost" continent of Atlantis.

In 1972, she married William Everett Stancell, a retired real estate developer, but divorced him in 1973. In 1978, she married William Robert Prestie, a Canadian 17 years her junior. This led to difficulties with her children. She had a long dispute with her daughter Judith Goodman over the estate of Judith's father. In 1979, Judith died by suicide at the age of 47.

Also in 1979, Caldwell suffered a stroke, which left her unable to speak, though she could still write (she had been deaf since about 1965). Her daughter Mary Margaret Fried accused Prestie of abusing and exploiting Caldwell, and there was a legal battle over her substantial assets.

== Death ==
Taylor Caldwell died of pulmonary failure, secondary to lung cancer, in Greenwich, Connecticut on August 30, 1985, aged 84. She had suffered a stroke in May 1980 that had left her paralyzed and speechless.

== Writings ==
Dynasty of Death was her first published work, a family saga lasting from 1837 to World War I, about two families in western Pennsylvania who rise to control a great armaments business. The story was continued in The Eagles Gather (1940) and The Final Hour (1944).

As a writer Caldwell was praised for her intricately plotted and suspenseful stories, which depicted family tensions and the development of the U.S. from an agrarian society into the leading industrial state of the world. Caldwell's heroes are self-made men of pronounced ethnic background, such as the German immigrants in The Strong City (1942) and The Balance Wheel (1951). Her themes are ethnic, religious and personal intolerance (The Wide House, 1945), the failure of parental discipline (Let Love Come Last, 1949) and the conflict between the desire for power and money and the human values of love and sense of family (Melissa (1948), A Prologue to Love (1962), and Bright Flows the River (1978).

In her later works, Caldwell explored the American Dream and wrote stories of the "rags to riches" course of life. Among these was her last great best-seller, Captains and the Kings (1972), which chronicles the rise to wealth of a poor Irish immigrant to America in the 1800s. Captains and the Kings was made into a television mini-series in 1976. Another was her last novel, Answer As a Man (1980). In 1952, she wrote The Devil's Advocate, set in a dystopia where North America has become a Communist dictatorship.

She wrote many historical novels, including several about famous religious figures. Dear and Glorious Physician (1959) was about Saint Luke; Great Lion of God (1970) was about Saint Paul; and I, Judas (1977) was about Judas Iscariot.

In The Earth Is the Lord's (1941), she fictionalized Genghis Khan; in The Arm and the Darkness (1943), Cardinal Richelieu; in A Pillar of Iron (1965), the Roman senator and orator Cicero; and in Glory and the Lightning (1974), Aspasia, mistress of the Athenian leader Pericles.

Caldwell addressed religious themes in several works. Answer As a Man begins with the church bells and ends with an evocation of renewed faith. Dialogues with the Devil (1967) is a correspondence between Lucifer and Michael the Archangel. Mixed into this dialogue are old tales, stories of a lost continent and of other worlds, and theological speculations.

== Social philosophy ==
The nature of human beings never changes; it is immutable. The present generation of children and the present generation of young adults from the age of thirteen to eighteen is, therefore, no different from that of their great-great-grandparents. Political fads come and go; theories rise and fall; the scientific 'truth' of today becomes the discarded error of tomorrow. Man's ideas change, but not his inherent nature. That remains. So, if the children are monstrous today – even criminal – it is not because their natures have become polluted, but because they have not been taught better, nor disciplined. – On Growing Up Tough, chapter The Purple Lodge

In her 1957 social/political article "Honoria" she chronicles the rise and fall of the fictitious country she calls "Honoria". She ends the article with a very foreboding rebuke of society. "It is a stern fact of history that no nation that rushed to the abyss ever turned back. Not ever, in the long history of the world. We are now on the edge of the abyss. Can we, for the first time in history, turn back? It is up to you."

Many of Caldwell's books centered on the idea that a small cabal of rich, powerful men secretly control the world.

== Published works ==
- Dynasty of Death (1938)
- The Eagles Gather (1940)
- The Earth Is the Lord's: A Tale of the Rise of Genghis Khan (1940)
- Time No Longer (1941)
- The Strong City (1942)
- The Arm and the Darkness (1943)
- The Turnbulls (1943)
- The Final Hour (1944)
- The Wide House (1945)
- This Side of Innocence (1946)
- There Was a Time (1947)
- Melissa (1948)
- Let Love Come Last (1949)
- The Balance Wheel (1951) / UK title The Beautiful Is Vanished (1951)
- The Devil's Advocate (1952)
- Maggie – Her Marriage (1953)
- Never Victorious, Never Defeated (1954)
- Your Sins and Mine (1955)
- Tender Victory (1956)
- The Sound of Thunder (1957)
- Dear and Glorious Physician (1958)
- The Listener (1960)
- A Prologue to Love (1961)
- The Late Clara Beame (1963)
- Grandmother and the Priests (1963) / UK title To See the Glory (1963)
- A Pillar of Iron (1965)
- Wicked Angel (1965)
- No One Hears But Him (1966)
- Dialogues with the Devil (1967)
- Testimony of Two Men (1968)
- Great Lion of God (1970)
- On Growing Up Tough (1971)
- Captains and the Kings (1972)
- To Look and Pass (1973)
- Glory and the Lightning (1974)
- The Romance of Atlantis (1975) (with Jess Stearn)
- Ceremony of the Innocent (1976)
- I, Judas (1977) (with Jess Stearn)
- Bright Flows the River (1978)
- Answer as a Man (1980)
- Unto All Men (2012 – novella discovered by her grandchildren)

== Sources ==
- Petri Liukkonen. "Taylor Caldwell". Books and Writers.
