= 3rd Rock from the Sun season 1 =

3rd Rock from the Sun
- Season 1
- DVD cover
- No. of episodes: 20

Release
- Original network: NBC
- Original release: January 9 – May 21, 1996

Season chronology
- Next → Season 2

The first season of 3rd Rock from the Sun, an American television sitcom, began on January 9, 1996, and ended on May 21, 1996. It aired on NBC. The region 1 DVD was released on July 26, 2005.

== Cast and characters ==
=== Main cast ===
- John Lithgow as Dick Solomon
- Kristen Johnston as Sally Solomon
- French Stewart as Harry Solomon
- Joseph Gordon-Levitt as Tommy Solomon
- Jane Curtin as Dr. Mary Albright

=== Recurring cast ===
- Simbi Khali as Nina Campbell
- Elmarie Wendel as Mrs. Mamie Dubcek
- Wayne Knight as Officer Don Leslie Orville
- David DeLuise as Bug Pollone
- Ian Lithgow as Leon
- Danielle Nicolet as Caryn
- Chris Hogan as Aubrey Pitman
- Ileen Getz as Dr. Judith Draper
- Shay Astar as August Leffler
- James Earl Jones as Narrator (uncredited voice)

== Episodes ==
No. overall	No. in season	Title	Directed by	Written by	Original release date	Prod. code	Viewers (millions)
1	1	"Brains and Eggs"	James Burrows	Bonnie Turner & Terry Turner	January 9, 1996	101	23.0
An alien expedition lands in Rutherford, Ohio, where they take the form of what they think is a typical human family. Although only intending to stay a short time, the aliens rent an apartment from Mrs. Dubcek. Dick, the mission commander, acquires a job as a physics professor at nearby Pendelton State University. After discovering the concept of emotions and becoming infatuated with his co-worker, Dr. Mary Albright, he extends their mission.
2	2	"Post-Nasal Dick"	Robert Berlinger	Michael Glouberman & Andrew Orenstein	January 16, 1996	105	22.2
The aliens become sick for the first time and assume they are dying. Despite being unwell, Dick accompanies Mary to a wedding, where he tries in vain to hide his ill health from her. However, after drinking too much cough syrup and making a scene at the service and the reception, Mary takes him home. Believing he does not have much time left, he tells her he loves her. Special guest: Martha Stewart
3	3	"Dick's First Birthday"	Robert Berlinger	Andy Cowan	January 23, 1996	106	21.8
The aliens discover the concept of age and Dick chooses a birthday. However, after Mary gives him a card that jokes about him looking "like a million dollars... old and wrinkled", he becomes offended and struggles to come to terms with his being past his prime. In an effort to appear young, he dyes his hair and wears ridiculously tight leather trousers, which squeak loudly.
4	4	"Dick Is from Mars, Sally Is from Venus"	Robert Berlinger	Bill Martin & Mike Schiff	January 30, 1996	103	20.1
Sally has her first date, but becomes upset when he does not call her back afterwards. In an effort to console her, Dick asks Mary and Nina to take Sally out and drown her sorrows. Tommy starts high school and Dick tries to bond with him in a fatherly way.
5	5	"Dick, Smoker"	Robert Berlinger	Bill Martin & Mike Schiff	February 6, 1996	107	19.2
Dick discovers smoking and becomes addicted. Sally gets annoyed that Dick ignores her complaints and wishes he did not have authority over her. When Dick accidentally locks himself in a stairwell while trying to find a place to smoke, Sally declares herself High Commander. (Absent: Jane Curtin as Mary) Special Guest: Jane Lynch
6	6	"Green-Eyed Dick"	Robert Berlinger	Joe Fisch	February 13, 1996	109	16.4
When an old boyfriend of Mary's (played by Ed Begley Jr.) reappears, Dick experiences jealousy. Harry adopts a stray dog, but Mrs. Dubcek will not allow him to keep it in the house, which prompts him to give it to a single mother (played by Katherine LaNasa).
7	7	"Lonely Dick"	Robert Berlinger	Christine Zander	February 20, 1996	110	19.5
When Mary goes on vacation, Dick misses her badly. Desperate to find her, he takes Nina out for dinner and pumps her for details on Mary's location. When this fails, he breaks into Mary's house. Sally and Harry become addicted to skin care products which promise them eternal youth. Tommy begins to date a classmate, August Leffler (played by Shay Astar).
8	8	"Body & Soul & Dick"	Robert Berlinger	Bonnie Turner & Terry Turner	February 27, 1996	113	19.4
An obnoxious professor (John Mahoney) dies during a party in his honor and his will states that he wants Dick to deliver a "forthright and honest" eulogy despite his being universally disliked. Tommy neglects his girlfriend, August, so he can date an "easy" cheerleader, Cheryl.
9	9	"Ab-dick-ted"	Robert Berlinger	Bob Kushell & Christine Zander	March 4, 1996	112	15.0
Dick wants his family to get along and thinks they can learn family values from observing Dr. Albright and her loopy brother Roy (Bronson Pinchot), so he invites them to dinner. The Solomons panic when Roy claims to have been abducted by aliens. August is annoyed with Tommy because Dick made him cancel his date with her to have dinner with Mary and Roy.
10	10	"Truth or Dick"	Robert Berlinger	Bonnie Turner & Terry Turner	March 12, 1996	102	19.7
Dick discovers the consequences of telling the truth when he repeats Mary's comments about how boring the Academic Committee is at one of their meetings. Mary is annoyed and enlightens Dick to the concept of 'bending the truth'. Sally and Harry attempt to get driver's licenses, but discover it is more difficult than they had expected.
11	11	"The Art of Dick"	Robert Berlinger	Bob Kushell	March 19, 1996	111	17.7
Harry cannot find anything at which he excels, but after painting the side of Mrs. Dubcek's house, decides to take an art class. Dick becomes annoyed when Harry turns out to be much better at art than he is. Sally takes control of a bake sale at Tommy's high school.
12	12	"Frozen Dick"	Robert Berlinger	Linwood Boomer	March 26, 1996	117	18.5
When Mary and Dick board a plane to Chicago, Dick panics and gets the pair thrown off. While driving to Chicago, it begins to snow. Dick panics again, believing the flakes to be aliens. He commandeers the car and crashes it, leaving the pair stranded at a truck stop. Harry gets a job in a video store and takes it upon himself to rearrange the videos according to his personal preferences. Sally, believing the human race is dead, attempts to restart mankind with Dick's student Leon, who arrives to drop off some homework.
13	13	"Angry Dick"	Robert Berlinger	Linwood Boomer	April 2, 1996	104	17.6
Dick and Sally befriend the couple next door, but anger the man when they drop by unannounced at 3am. Dick attempts to mend fences, but instead makes the situation worse due to his arrogance. They later reconcile.
14	14	"The Dicks They Are a Changin'"	Robert Berlinger	Michael Glouberman & Andrew Orenstein	April 9, 1996	108	18.7
When Nina informs Dick she is unable to locate his graduate records, he panics and acts defensively. Mary notes that Dick is often secretive about his past and, while reminiscing about her rebellious time as a student at Berkeley in the 1960s, concludes he is Manny Rosenberg, an activist whom she knew briefly. Dick first denies this, but quickly assumes Rosenberg's identity when he realizes it makes Mary more attracted to him. Harry joins a CD club, but finds the responsibilities of membership overwhelming.
15	15	"I Enjoy Being a Dick"	Robert Berlinger	Christine Zander	April 21, 1996	116	13.4
Dick feels excluded from the others in his office because he is male and asks Mary and Nina if he may join them at a women-only study group. When they decline, Dick attends the meeting dressed as a woman and introduces himself as Dickie Jo. When Sally and Harry get jobs at a pancake house, Sally becomes irritated at the lack of tips. Tommy considers telling his girlfriend the truth about where he and his family really come from.
16	16	"Dick Like Me"	Robert Berlinger	Joe Fisch	April 23, 1996	115	16.7
When Nina wears an African headdress to work, Dick realizes the Solomons have no ethnic affiliation and does research to determine which group is "best". He is about to give up his search when Mrs. Dubcek casually mentions that she assumes the family is Jewish because of their surname. Sally falls for Tommy's teacher, Mr. Randell, who invites her to attend a school dance. She panics, however, when she realizes she does not know how to dance.
17	17	"Assault with a Deadly Dick"	Robert Berlinger	Michael Glouberman & Andrew Orenstein	April 30, 1996	114	14.5
After their car radio is stolen and Dick is mugged at an ATM, Sally worries she is failing at her job as Security Officer. When the family goes to file a police report, Sally meets officer Don (first appearance of Wayne Knight). Tommy joins the school basketball team.
18	18	"Father Knows Dick"	Robert Berlinger	Bob Kushell	May 7, 1996	119	12.1
Dick decides he should become Harry's father and attempts to treat him as a son. When Harry questions what his role is in the group's mission, Dick reluctantly tells him about the radio receiver that was implanted in Harry's head. Harry becomes angry and runs away from home. Sally goes on a date with Mr. Randell and meets his mother (played by Naomi Judd), who is hostile to her.
19	19	"Selfish Dick"	Robert Berlinger	David Sacks	May 14, 1996	120	12.5
Mary moves to a better office, but Dick misses her and schemes to get her back into the old office with him. When Mrs. Dubcek cuts her finger, Sally sees blood for the first time and faints. After being admitted to the hospital, she, Harry, and Tommy dress as doctors and act out every medical drama they have seen.
20	20	"See Dick Run"	James Burrows	Bill Martin & Mike Schiff	May 21, 1996	118	12.4
Mary finally agrees to go on a date with Dick. While at a Benihana-style Japanese restaurant, Dick shows off his food-chopping skills after Mary accidentally incapacitates the chef. The pair then returns to Dick's apartment where they have sex. Tommy's report prompts the Big Giant Head to declare that the group has wasted its time on Earth and announces his intention to find a replacement for Dick.
