= 3rd Rock from the Sun season 6 =

3rd Rock from the Sun
- Season 6
- DVD cover
- No. of episodes: 20

Release
- Original network: NBC
- Original release: October 24, 2000 – May 22, 2001

Season chronology
- ← Previous; Season 5

The sixth and final season of 3rd Rock from the Sun, an American television series, began October 24, 2000, and ended on May 22, 2001. It aired on NBC. The region 1 DVD was released on November 14, 2006.

== Cast and characters ==
=== Main cast ===
- John Lithgow as Dick Solomon
- Kristen Johnston as Sally Solomon
- French Stewart as Harry Solomon
- Joseph Gordon-Levitt as Tommy Solomon
- Jane Curtin as Dr. Mary Albright
- Simbi Khali as Nina Campbell
- Elmarie Wendel as Mrs. Mamie Dubcek
- Wayne Knight as Officer Don Leslie Orville

=== Recurring cast ===
- David DeLuise as Bug Pollone
- Ian Lithgow as Leon
- Danielle Nicolet as Caryn
- Chris Hogan as Aubrey Pitman
- Ileen Getz as Dr. Judith Draper
- Jan Hooks as Vicki Dubcek
- Ron West as Dr. Vincent Strudwick
- Larisa Oleynik as Alissa Strudwick
- John Cleese as Dr. Liam Neesam

== Episodes ==
No. overall	No. in season	Title	Directed by	Written by	Original release date	Prod. code	Viewers (millions)
120	1	"Les Liaisons Dickgereuses"	Terry Hughes	Dave Goetsch & Jason Venokur	October 24, 2000	609	12.58
Mary's wealthy sister Renata Albright (Megan Mullally) has donated a large sum of money to have an extension built onto Pendelton University, but Mary knows that it is in fact a spiteful gesture designed to quite literally block the sunlight into her office. To retaliate, Dick schemes with Mary that he will woo Renata, win her, and then break her heart. Meanwhile, Sally and Harry are given ten thousand dollars by Renata to convert their house into a teen center. (Absent: Joseph Gordon-Levitt as Tommy Solomon)
121	2	"Fear and Loathing in Rutherford"	Terry Hughes	Aron Abrams & Gregory Thompson	October 31, 2000	603	8.84
Tommy is still reeling from his breakup with Alissa, but Sally and Harry convince him that if he can find an excuse to go over to her house, he can persuade her to watch a movie with him. When the pair leave the house together, however, Strudwick is suspicious and confronts Dick. Mrs. Dubcek suggests that they could have eloped, so Dick and Strudwick rush off to track them down before there's a baby on the scene, managing to accidentally abandon Mary in the process. Meanwhile, Tommy has rented a scary movie to watch with Alissa, in the hope that it might bring her into his arms, but Sally and Harry decide to show up and make it more real.
122	3	"InDickscretion"	Terry Hughes	Nastaran Dibai & Jeffrey B. Hodes	November 14, 2000	605	7.65
Dick and Mary decide to go on a double date with Sally and Don, but things start to become uncomfortable when Dick and Sally begin talking incessantly about how good their other half is in bed. The next day Dick and Sally come to realize that neither Mary or Don said anything about how good they are, and immediately worry that they aren't. Meanwhile, in a food store, Mary and Don run into each other and, consumed by what they'd heard about each other in bed, share a kiss. Elsewhere, Harry and Tommy follow in the footsteps of Jack Kerouac and take to the open road.
123	4	"Dick'll Take Manhattan Part 1"	Terry Hughes	Christine Zander & Mark Nutter	November 21, 2000	612	8.23
The Solomons visit a parallel universe, in which they are living in New York City, where Dick is a highly regarded attorney, Sally writes a sex column and Harry is President of NBC, while Tommy is a star on Saturday Night Live. Despite this, Dick is unhappy because he cannot find Mary; however, upon entering a basement bar he discovers her, a failed actress-turned torch singer who has renamed herself Kiki Lyle. Meanwhile, Sally discovers that Don is the Mayor of New York, and that she isn't his girlfriend, but his mistress.
124	5	"Dick'll Take Manhattan Part 2"	Terry Hughes	Christine Zander & Mark Nutter	November 28, 2000	613	7.91
Dick takes Mary up to his penthouse and wines and dines her, but she tells him that she doesn't believe in true love anymore, no matter how hard he might try to persuade her otherwise. Meanwhile, Sally isn't happy being second fiddle to Don's wife so she asks him to break up with her. Don, however, wants to run for president and so refuses, so Sally breaks up with him; while at NBC, Tommy's huge ego and demand for a high pay on Saturday Night Live leads Harry to fire him.
125	6	"Why Dickie Can't Teach"	Terry Hughes	Story by : David Sacks; Teleplay by : Joe Liss & David Lewman	December 5, 2000	606	7.46
Tommy is looking for a college to attend and Dick steers him away from the big names such as Harvard and tries to convince him to attend Pendelton instead. Upon taking one of Dick's classes, however, Tommy decides that Dick is a lousy teacher and that he would rather look elsewhere. Outraged, Dick orders Tommy to go to Pendelton. Meanwhile, Sally is concerned that Don isn't listed one of Rutherford's ten most powerful men and so she gets him a job working for one of them.
126	7	"B.D.O.C."	Terry Hughes	Aron Abrams & Gregory Thompson	December 12, 2000	602	8.05
The Solomons' say goodbye to Tommy as he goes to college, but Dick soon begins to miss him and attempts to convince him to come home. Tommy, however, is enjoying college life and doesn't want to, so Dick convinces him to pull an elaborate freshman prank to gain himself popularity, but really in the hope that Tommy will be expelled. Meanwhile, Sally and Harry are interviewing candidates for Tommy's replacement and although their best candidate appears to be a woman called Christie, when a handsome man named Bryce walks through the door, Sally hires him on the spot.
127	8	"Red, White & Dick"	Terry Hughes	Will Forte	December 19, 2000	604	6.83
After hearing the crowd sing "The Star-Spangled Banner" at a baseball game, Dick realizes that humans are passionate about their country of origin and attempts to become more American, only to discover that he actually has a Canadian passport. Meanwhile, the other Solomons try to work on the basis that all Americans are equal, and start an equality system in the house, but put Harry in charge, who makes everybody wear the same uniform and rations household items, until Tommy rebels, fearing that they are losing their individuality.
128	9	"Dick Digs"	Terry Hughes	David M. Israel & Jim O'Doherty	January 9, 2001	601	7.91
When Dick accompanies Mary on an archeological dig, he is disappointed when the only thing he finds is a small pointed rock. Mary realizes, however, that it is an ancient spearhead and becomes upset, revealing that she has never found anything before. So, in order to make Mary happy, Dick steals a ceremonial wedding moon that was found the previous day and lays it for Mary to find. Meanwhile, the Rutherford Garlic Festival is on and Sally, Harry and Tommy decide to turn their attic apartment into a hotel, but things soon become hostile between them as they attempt to make their 'hotel' good enough to get a four star rating in the Crown Travel Guide.
129	10	"There's No Business Like Dick Business"	Terry Hughes	Dave Boerger	January 16, 2001	610	8.96
After playing assistant to a magician at a child's birthday party, Dick decides to himself become a magician, with Sally as his assistant. They become a huge success, performing shows night after night at a local club, but show business soon starts to eat away at their offstage relationship until they hate each other. Meanwhile, Mary joins a defense class after being mugged in the park, while Harry joins the class as the man in the padded suit that everyone attacks. (Absent: Joseph Gordon-Levitt as Tommy Solomon)
130	11	"A Dick Replacement"	Terry Hughes	Matt Silverstein & Dave Jeser	January 30, 2001	607	7.54
Dick and Mary visit a psychic together, who claims that the pair are from two different worlds and predicts that Dick will one day up and leave Mary. Horrified at this news, Dick decides to find a replacement boyfriend for her, settling on a man called Gary (Charles Rocket); who thinks he's actually being offered Dick's position of physics professor. Meanwhile, Sally and Harry decide that if the psychic really knows that they are aliens, then they must kill her, but in a way that isn't possible for her to predict. (Absent: Joseph Gordon-Levitt as Tommy Solomon)
131	12	"Dick's Ark"	Terry Hughes	Danny Smith	February 6, 2001	608	8.12
Dick has bought a new camera, with which he makes Mary angry, by constantly taking her picture against her wishes. As a result, Mary decides that the two need some time apart. Meanwhile, Sally's coat is ruined when Harry wears it out in the rain, but he claims that the Channel 10 weatherman said it was going to be sunny. Sally marches down to the station and tries to convince them to pay for her coat, but it soon becomes apparent that Sally is excellent at predicting the weather, so they give her the position. Dick, however, is worried that Sally's spot on prediction of the weather will attract unwanted attention and so, when she discovers that Rutherford is to be hit by tornados, he orders her to report otherwise. (Absent: Joseph Gordon-Levitt as Tommy Solomon)
132	13	"You Don't Know Dick"	Terry Hughes	Danny Smith	February 13, 2001	616	7.32
Nina accuses Dick of knowing nothing about Mary, so in an attempt to prove her wrong, when Judith walks into the office announcing that she has two tenth-row tickets to a Gordon Lightfoot concert, Dick claims to already have front row tickets. Of course, he doesn't, and so attempts to find a pair of front row tickets before it is too late. Meanwhile, Sally tells Chaz, the Channel 10 anchorman, that she would like to start presenting the news instead, and so he agrees to let her interview Lightfoot in the company's box at the Rutherdome; but really, he intends to seduce her. (Absent: Joseph Gordon-Levitt as Tommy Solomon)
133	14	"My Mother, My Dick"	Terry Hughes	Nastaran Dibai & Jeffrey B. Hodes	February 20, 2001	611	7.66
Mary's mother Martha (Elaine Stritch) arrives in town and Dick decides to tell her what Mary really thinks of her - that she ruined her childhood. Angry, Martha tries to attack Dick and falls over, ending up in hospital. When Dick goes to visit, however, Martha tells him her side of the story, and a deeply moved Dick takes her side and promises to tend to her during her recovery. Meanwhile, Harry and Sally get a nasty surprise when throwing junk into the time space portal - a new alien (Mark McKinney). (Absent: Joseph Gordon-Levitt as Tommy Solomon)
134	15	"Glengarry Glen Dick"	Terry Hughes	Aron Abrams & Gregory Thompson	April 17, 2001	614	7.42
After hearing a pitch for a timeshare, Dick is sold and, unable to afford it entirely, he convinces Don to pay the other half. When Dick, Mary, Sally and Don take their first holiday there, however, they find it to be dismal; small and windowless, with nothing in the surrounding area but a prison. Meanwhile, Tommy has finally outgrown Harry, leading Harry, paranoid that he is shrinking, to consult a doctor.
135	16	"Dick Soup for the Soul"	Terry Hughes	Sean Veder	May 1, 2001	615	5.58
Dick accompanies Mary and Nina to a book-signing for a self-help book entitled 'A Road Map to Happiness', and despite first thinking it stupid, Dick opens the book and is immediately converted. He then concludes that his relationship with Mary stands in the way of his happiness, and attempts to break up with her. At college, Tommy is attempting to get into a fraternity but is doubtful that he'll pass the entry rituals, so he enlists Sally's help, but she just ends up making it harder. Meanwhile, Mrs. Dubcek gives Harry the job of painting the kitchen ceiling, and he is determined to create a work of art.
136	17	"Mary Loves Scoochie: Part One"	Terry Hughes	Aron Abrams & Gregory Thompson & Dave Boerger	May 8, 2001	617	6.62
Dick discovers that Mary has been receiving elaborate love letters from a mystery man named 'Scoochie' and confronts her about it. She reveals that she has been receiving them for years but has no idea who Scoochie actually is, so Dick pretends that it has been him all along. This goes wrong, however, when the real Scoochie arranges to meet Mary at the Medieval Festival. Meanwhile, after another alien unit operating in Ohio wins an award over the Solomons at the Alien Award Show, Sally and Harry make it their mission to track them down, and eventually move in with an Amish family, who they believe to be the other unit, since they are so different. (Absent: Joseph Gordon-Levitt as Tommy)
137	18	"Mary Loves Scoochie: Part Two"	Terry Hughes	Will Forte	May 15, 2001	618	6.18
With the identity of Scoochie revealed to be Liam Neesam (John Cleese), an alien who had visited Pendelton three years ago, Dick is panicked, and follows Liam and Mary to dinner, where he overhears Liam offering her a job with a six-figure salary. The other Solomons suggest that Dick reveal himself as another alien in order to gain Liam's respect. When he does, however, Liam reveals that he doesn't care for Mary, but that she is part of a huge plan to transform the Earth's entire population into monkeys, and rename it Planet Monkey World, so that it may be an exhibit for aliens. Meanwhile, Sally, Harry and Tommy discover that their favorite movie, Arthur 2: On the Rocks has a 'prequel' - Arthur.
138	19	"The Thing That Wouldn't Die: Part One"	Terry Hughes	Story by : Dave Lewman & Joe Liss; Teleplay by : Dave Jeser and Matt Silverstein	May 22, 2001	619	11.88
Mary is having trouble dealing with seeing Dick transform Liam into a monkey, which Dick did to stop Liam doing the same to the Earth's population. Dick consults the other Solomons and they decide that the best approach is to deny everything. Mary meets with Nina and Judith, who confess that they've always believed there's something suspicious about Dick. Nina thinks Dick is an international terrorist; Judith is convinced he's a psychopathic serial killer itching to place Mary's head in a box. When Dick and Mary next meet, she demands that he tell her the truth about himself. Dick admits that he and the others are in fact aliens, from outer space. Mary's first reaction is anger at being lied to again, but when pressed to think back with that added information, she flashes through disbelief, shock, surprise, brief nausea, then slow realisation and ending with finding it sexy to be dating a "spaceman". Elsewhere, the local store has been robbed and Sally catches Don hiding in the frozen foods freezer, which he admits that he did because he was scared. Harry takes a different line and asks the shopkeeper Sam out on a date, but later runs into her working at a posh restaurant, where she instructs him to call her Samantha. Confused, Harry believes that he is dating twins, so confused high jinx ensues as he tries to juggle them 'both' on a date, attempting to keep her (Sam) from herself (Samantha) - finally losing out altogether. At the end, as they sit out on the roof discussing the day's events, Harry receives a transmission from the Big Giant Head telling them that after a complaint from Liam about their changing him into an ape, their mission on earth has been terminated. They are to pack immediately as their earth bodies will be terminated in a couple days. They're utterly shocked and dismayed at the news, none wanting to leave to go back home. (Absent: Joseph Gordon-Levitt as Tommy)
139	20	"The Thing That Wouldn't Die: Part Two"	Terry Hughes	Story by : Christine Zander; Teleplay by : Dave Goetsch & Jason Venokur	May 22, 2001	620	11.88
The Solomons are struggling to take in the news - they have been ordered back home due to Dick's transgression with Liam. Dick's first instinct is to ask Mary to come, so he takes her to the planetarium before breaking the news to her that they are leaving, and asking her if she will join them, and she agrees. Meanwhile, since admitting his fear to Sally, Don has decided to quit the police force and open a muffin store, but Sally is disgusted by this career choice and decides to whip Don into shape - and turn him into a hardy police officer. At home, Harry and Tommy are attempting to organize a farewell party for the aliens, but have no money, so they decide to max out their credit cards and not worry about paying the bill, since they'll be halfway across the galaxy - they even hire Elvis Costello to sing "Fly Me to the Moon". Afterward, the family and Mary drive the Rambler to the spot where the Solomons first appeared on Earth in "Brains and Eggs". As they are about to be beamed aboard the mother-ship, Mary says that as much as she loves Dick, her home is Earth, and she can't leave it. Dick erases Mary's memories of him, but leaves the feeling of love, and puts the keys to the Rambler in her unconscious hand. The family re-assembles in the Rambler and sings their mission song as they're beamed away.
