= 3rd Rock from the Sun season 4 =

3rd Rock from the Sun
- Season 4
- DVD cover
- No. of episodes: 24

Release
- Original network: NBC
- Original release: September 23, 1998 – May 25, 1999

Season chronology
- ← Previous; Season 3 Next → Season 5

The fourth season of 3rd Rock from the Sun, an American television series, began September 23, 1998, and ended on May 25, 1999. It aired on NBC. The region 1 DVD was released on May 2, 2006.

== Cast and characters ==
=== Main cast ===
- John Lithgow as Dick Solomon
- Kristen Johnston as Sally Solomon
- French Stewart as Harry Solomon
- Joseph Gordon-Levitt as Tommy Solomon
- Jane Curtin as Dr. Mary Albright
- Simbi Khali as Nina Campbell
- Elmarie Wendel as Mrs. Mamie Dubcek
- Wayne Knight as Sergeant Don Leslie Orville

=== Recurring cast ===
- David DeLuise as Bug Pollone
- Ian Lithgow as Leon
- Danielle Nicolet as Caryn
- Chris Hogan as Aubrey Pitman
- Ileen Getz as Dr. Judith Draper
- Shay Astar as August Leffler
- Jan Hooks as Vicki Dubcek
- Ron West as Dr. Vincent Strudwick
- William Shatner as The Big Giant Head
- Larisa Oleynik as Alissa Strudwick
- Laurie Metcalf as Jennifer Ravelli

== Episodes ==
No. overall	No. in season	Title	Directed by	Written by	Original release date	Prod. code	Viewers (millions)
74	1	"Dr. Solomon's Traveling Alien Show"	Terry Hughes	Christine Zander	September 23, 1998	402	11.66
Vicki and the Solomons continue to search for Harry, who was abducted and sold to a circus by Vicki's ex, Randy, where Harry's transmissions from The Big Giant Head award him popularity as the act "Hargo the Alien". Meanwhile, the loss of Harry means that the aliens' status report continues to remain past-due, for which The Big Giant Head's punishment is to slowly cease Dick's brain functions. The group races to find and convince Harry to transmit their report and come home to the family and Rutherford before it is too late for Dick. Phil Hartman, who appeared as Randy in "Eat, Drink, Dick, Mary," part 1 of this storyline and the season 3 finale, was shot and killed by his wife eight days after the episode aired. His character does not appear in this episode.
75	2	"Power Mad Dick"	Terry Hughes	David Sacks	October 7, 1998	401	9.70
After Mary is made the new Dean of the School of Arts and Sciences, Dick uses her position to his advantage and ends up firing his arch nemesis, cafeteria worker Lucy, who then files a grievance. Sally prepares to lose her virginity to Don, but afterwards finds that she cannot talk to anyone about it, much to the other Solomons' annoyance.
76	3	"Feelin' Albright"	Terry Hughes	Bob Kushell	October 14, 1998	403	9.63
Dick attends a function with Mary and finds that, because she is Dean, he is ignored by everybody except the wives of the other Deans. In order to prove his worth, he decides to hold a fashion show to raise enough money to have the dilapidated statue of Admiral Pendleton restored. Meanwhile, Sally is horrified when she learns that Don had dated other women before her, and strives to track them all down. Harry and Tommy try to raise their own funds by setting up a lemonade stand. Guest appearance by Curtis Mayfield.
77	4	"Collect Call for Dick"	Terry Hughes	David M. Israel & Jim O'Doherty	October 21, 1998	404	9.42
The Solomons discover a brand of new collectibles called Fuzzy Buddies (a parody of Beanie Babies) when eating at a fast food diner, and Dick soon becomes so obsessed with collecting them that he begins to lose control of his family's finances. Tommy's coach is annoyed at his lack of team 'pep' and so makes him the school mascot - a giant owl called Hootie. Things goes wrong, however, when Tommy becomes so high on school pep that he attacks the coach. (Absent: Wayne Knight as Officer Don)
78	5	"What's Love Got to Do, Got to Do With Dick?"	Terry Hughes	Bill Martin & Mike Schiff	October 28, 1998	405	9.26
Dick is annoyed that Mary, in her new position as Dean, has little time for him anymore, and is even more annoyed when he is told that he has to share is office with new literature professor Jennifer Ravelli (Laurie Metcalf). Despite his initial dislike, and attempts to stay loyal to Mary, he soon becomes infatuated with Jennifer. Sally tries to fix Nina up with Don's cop friend Eric, but becomes irritated when they don't take to each other. At Happy Doug's bar, Tommy fixes up an old 'love tester' machine but is disappointed when it classifies him as 'cold fish' and Harry 'hot stuff'. (Absent: Elmarie Wendel as Mrs. Dubcek)
79	6	"I Am Dick Pentameter!"	Terry Hughes	Dave Goetsch & Jason Venokur	November 4, 1998	406	10.76
On his way to his first dinner-date with Jennifer, Dick suggests to Mary that they should see other people, who laughingly agrees, assuming it to be a cry for attention and doubtful that another woman would have him. Dick's so-called love for Jennifer quickly wanes, as her initially charming quirks become annoying, and he begins to miss Mary. Meanwhile, Sally, Harry and Tommy experiment with the traditional purposes of various rooms at home, rearranging furniture and appliances. (Absent: Elmarie Wendel as Mrs. Dubcek)
80	7	"D3: Judgement Day"	Terry Hughes	Michael Glouberman & Andrew Orenstein	November 11, 1998	407	9.98
Dick is all ready to dump Jennifer and try to win back Mary's heart, but then discovers that his relationship with Jennifer has made her jealous. Wanting the old Mary back, who had time for him over her job, he attempts to capitalize on her jealousy by making his romantic interludes with Jennifer very obvious. Officer Don introduces Sally to bowling, but becomes exasperated when she refuses to play by the rules, and so invites Harry and Tommy behind her back.
81	8	"Indecent Dick"	Terry Hughes	Bob Kushell	December 9, 1998	410	8.69
When Playpen magazine arrives at Pendleton, looking for students to pose nude, Sally decides to take part. While Dick encourages this, Don is furious. Dick is horrified when he discovers that Mary posed nude for an art shoot twenty years ago, and tracks down the photographer. Harry decides to test if clothes are "all a big scam" by becoming a nudist. Tommy has his eyes on his new lab partner, Alissa Strudwick (Larisa Oleynik). Note: In 1999, TV Guide ranked this episode # 49 on its "The 50 Funniest TV Moments of All Time" list.
82	9	"Happy New Dick!"	Terry Hughes	Christine Zander	December 16, 1998	409	7.54
As 1998 comes to close, Dick worries that he hasn't accomplished anything worthwhile and struggles to do something to make the past year count. Meanwhile, Officer Don becomes annoyed with Sally after she uses her feminine wiles to persuade him to get tickets for Rutherford's exclusive Starlight Room, then changes her mind when he succeeds. At Happy Doug's bar, Harry and Tommy plan an explosive New Year's party and Harry hires on his old night school friends, Larry and Mrs. Deguzman, but they turn out to be layabouts.
83	10	"Two-Faced Dick"	Terry Hughes	Gil Goldberg	January 5, 1999	411	11.64
After three years, the Big Giant Head has finally accepted Sally's request to have her body changed for a man's. For their convenience, the bodies of Dick and Sally are switched. Now, in each other's bodies, Dick and Sally must try to maintain each other's romantic relationships and get accustomed to the changes that their new gender brings, while waiting for their request to be switched back to be accepted. Meanwhile, Harry is left in charge of Happy Doug's when Doug goes on vacation, but becomes worried when a group of burly, tough-looking bikers arrive.
84	11	"Dick Solomon of the Indiana Solomons"	Terry Hughes	Gregg Mettler	January 12, 1999	408	11.29
An invitation arrives in the mail from an 'Aunt Florence', inviting 'Richard Solomon' to attend a Solomon family reunion in Indiana. This is obviously a mistake, so Dick phones Florence to set the record straight. Upon discovering that Richard is so estranged that his family wouldn't recognize him anyway, he decides that the aliens could do with some roots and accepts the invitation. Upon arriving, however, it becomes clear that the only reason the real Richard is estranged is because of an old family fallout - and it hasn't burned out yet. (Absent: Elmarie Wendel as Mrs. Dubcek)
85	12	"Dick and Taxes"	Terry Hughes	Story by : Dennis Snee; Teleplay by : Michael Glouberman & Andrew Orenstein	February 2, 1999	415	10.08
When Harry's boss Doug starts deducting income tax from Harry's paycheck, the Solomons realize that they have never filed a tax return and that they owe $9500 to the government. To combat this, they invent the 'brilliant' notion of lying on their tax return and Dick reworks the sums so that the government owes them several hundred thousand dollars. Sally attempts to help by setting up a failed home hairdressing business, but when women start arriving for haircuts, Harry and Tommy 'camp up' and take to the 'salon' to help. Lying doesn't work, however, and the Solomons are faced with an audit - and the threat of being exposed as aliens. (Absent: Wayne Knight as Officer Don)
86	13	"Sally Forth"	Terry Hughes	David Sacks	February 9, 1999	412	8.54
Dick is in a dispute with the Dubceks because Mrs. Dubcek won't fix his sink until he pays the rent, and he won't pay the rent until she fixes his sink. Eventually, Mrs. Dubcek ends up shutting off the Solomons' power, while Vicki invites Harry to move in with them. Sally has other things on her mind; after voicing to Officer Don that she is fed up with living with the other Solomons, he has proposed to her - but she doesn't know if she is ready. Meanwhile, Tommy deliberately lands himself in detention with his dream girl Alissa, so that he has a chance ask her out.
87	14	"Paranoid Dick"	Terry Hughes	David M. Israel & Jim O'Doherty	February 16, 1999	414	9.30
When a meeting is rescheduled without her having been notified, Mary begins to have doubts about the longevity of her position as Dean, and Dick leads her to become paranoid that there is a conspiracy to have her removed from her job. The pair decide to investigate, and end up breaking into Judith's office by night for evidence, only to be caught by the police. Vicki Dubcek decides that the best thing Sally needs to help her get over her break up with Don is a weekend of riverboat gambling on the Cincinnati Queen, a floating casino - where Harry manages to win big, while Sally gets her lips on a Neil Diamond impersonator (Bryan Cranston). (Absent: Elmarie Wendel as Mrs. Dubcek)
88	15	"The House That Dick Built"	Terry Hughes	Bill Martin & Mike Schiff	February 23, 1999	413	9.25
Dick begins to feel that the unit is falling apart when Sally announces her plans to move out, and he tries in vain to clip her wings. That isn't the last of his problems, however, since Harry is considering having a baby with Vicki - despite the possibility that it could turn out to be an alien. Meanwhile, Tommy sees babysitting with Alissa as an opportunity to prove to a dubious Harry that she really is his girlfriend.
89	16	"Superstitious Dick"	Terry Hughes	Gregg Mettler	March 2, 1999	416	8.30
Dick is up for a prestigious grant but his chances look somewhat marred when he and Mary receive chain letters, and Mary, upon throwing hers away, becomes victim to a series of misfortunes. Dick looks toward superstitious rituals and lucky charms for help. Don treats Tommy and Alissa to a series of ice hockey games for which he bought tickets for when he was dating Sally, but Tommy begins to worry that he isn't manly enough to compete with the likes of the players. Sally and Harry visit a hardware store, where Sally takes a liking to a series of workers, while Harry is mistaken for an employee, due to his bright orange shirt.
90	17	"Y2dicK"	Terry Hughes	Dave Goetsch & Jason Venokur	March 16, 1999	417	8.74
Dick realizes that he doesn't know how to use a computer and strives to learn how to use one. When he does it takes over his life and he becomes a recluse. Sally and Tommy decide to do away with their old TV in favor of a newer, better one, but end up becoming addicted, wanting all the latest features. Harry and Vicki, however, are trying to get pregnant, but the medical-science part of it is turning Harry off. Guest appearance by Edward Herrmann. (Absent: Elmarie Wendel as Mrs. Dubcek)
91	18	"Dick the Mouth Solomon"	Terry Hughes	Christine Zander & Bob Kushell	April 6, 1999	418	9.68
When at an Italian restaurant, Sally meets an Italian-American man and begins dating him. After learning that he is known as Sammy 'The Butcher' Marchetti, she and Tommy assume that he is some kind of mobster, and when he starts giving Tommy errands to run, Tommy is delighted to think that he is an errand boy for the mob. Sally, however, is less than happy. Mary suggests that she and Dick go on a couples retreat so that they can work on their communication skills. Despite her good intentions, everybody, including Harry and Vicki, embraces Dick's openness and criticizes her for pointing the finger.
92	19	"Citizen Solomon"	Terry Hughes	Christ Atwood	April 27, 1999	420	7.82
Dick, Tommy, and Harry begin to notice that, since Sally moved out, their apartment has become filthy. Mary suggests that Dick hires her maid part-time, but, to her annoyance, Dick ends up stealing her full time. When Sally finds out that she has been replaced, she is hurt. Tommy has managed to get himself in charge of the school newspaper, but he becomes so dedicated to printing the absolute truth that he begin to worry school officials and even alienate his girlfriend Alissa. (Absent: Wayne Knight as Officer Don)
93	20	"Alien Hunter"	Terry Hughes	Bonnie Turner & Terry Turner	May 4, 1999	422	12.48
It is the day before Dick's birthday and he has ordered Sally, Harry and Tommy to throw him a surprise party. When in class he meets a woman called Charlotte Everly (Kathy Bates) who appears to be very taken by his 'brilliance'. Charlotte first claims to be auditing his class, then later claims to be a reporter, then an intellectual groupie. She and her son wangle her way into his birthday plans, cancel his party and lock the guests that do arrive in the basement. She then reveals to Dick that she knows that Dick is an alien - and she wants to cut him open. Kathy Bates' appearance in this episode spoofed her role in the film Misery, when Dick refers to her as his "number one fan".
94	21	"Dick vs. Strudwick"	Terry Hughes	Story by : Gregg Mettler; Teleplay by : David M. Israel & Jim O'Doherty	May 11, 1999	419	11.50
Dick is jealous when fellow physics professor Vincent Strudwick publishes a critically acclaimed, bestselling book on physics, and, while Mary busies herself showing the visiting Nobel Prize winners around the campus, he decides to write a second book that will better Strudwick's. He then realizes, however, that he cannot publish all the secrets of the universe without raising unwanted questions, and so looks for another way to get at Strudwick, using Tommy and Alissa - who, it turns out, is Strudwick's daughter. Sally and Don decide to start hanging out as friends, but soon find themselves unable to resist each other. (Absent: Elmarie Wendel as Mrs. Dubcek)
95	22	"Near Dick Experience"	Terry Hughes	Story by : David Sacks; Teleplay by : Dave Goetsch & Jason Venokur	May 18, 1999	421	10.25
When Sally, Harry and Tommy are nearly crushed by a chandelier in a restaurant, they feel reborn, as if they are discovering everything for the first time. Dick is jealous, however, and while Sally and Harry volunteer themselves at a homeless shelter, he strives to have a near-death experience so that he might enjoy life like they do - and a faculty trip into the mountains presents itself as the perfect opportunity. Meanwhile, Tommy decides to waste no more time in his life - and asks Alissa to marry him. (Absent: Elmarie Wendel as Mrs. Dubcek)
96	23	"Dick's Big Giant Headache Part 1"	Terry Hughes	Bill Martin & Mike Schiff	May 25, 1999	423	8.11
The Big Giant Head sends a message that he intends to visit Earth, so Dick quickly orders Sally to move back in and Harry to stop attempting to make a baby with Vicki. He then attempts to prepare Mary for his visit by telling her that an 'old college chum' is visiting and that she would be well advised to discuss how much he has learned in bed. Harry tries his best to avoid Vicki, but eventually resorts to telling her that he can't father a child with her right now. When the Big Giant Head (William Shatner) arrives on Earth, he is unimpressed with Dick, his leadership skills and his choice of girlfriend, while being impressed with Sally, her style, and her body.
97	24	"Dick's Big Giant Headache Part 2"	Terry Hughes	Michael Glouberman & Andrew Orenstein	May 25, 1999	424	8.11
Dick is suffering the humiliation of having been demoted from High Commander to Harry's assistant, performing the most menial jobs, while Sally has been promoted to his old role. Tommy is preparing for his high school prom with Alissa, but when the Big Giant Head insists on coming, things start to slide, especially when Vicki, who missed out on her own high school prom, turns up. After ruining the prom for Tommy and Alissa, the Big Giant Head whisks Vicki off to his bachelor pod in space.
