= 3rd Rock from the Sun season 5 =

3rd Rock from the Sun
- Season 5
- DVD cover
- No. of episodes: 22

Release
- Original network: NBC
- Original release: September 21, 1999 – May 23, 2000

Season chronology
- ← Previous; Season 4 Next → Season 6

The fifth season of 3rd Rock from the Sun, an American television series, began September 21, 1999, and ended on May 23, 2000. It aired on NBC. The region 1 DVD was released on August 15, 2006.

== Cast and characters ==
=== Main cast ===
- John Lithgow as Dick Solomon
- Kristen Johnston as Sally Solomon
- French Stewart as Harry Solomon
- Joseph Gordon-Levitt as Tommy Solomon
- Jane Curtin as Dr. Mary Albright
- Simbi Khali as Nina Campbell
- Elmarie Wendel as Mrs. Mamie Dubcek
- Wayne Knight as Officer Don Leslie Orville

=== Recurring cast ===
- David DeLuise as Bug Pollone
- Ian Lithgow as Leon
- Danielle Nicolet as Caryn
- Chris Hogan as Aubrey Pitman
- Ileen Getz as Dr. Judith Draper
- Jan Hooks as Victoria Marie "Vicki" Dubcek
- Ron West as Dr. Vincent Strudwick
- William Shatner as The Big Giant Head
- Larisa Oleynik as Alissa Strudwick
- Chyna (Joanie) Laurer as Janice

== Episodes ==
No. overall	No. in season	Title	Directed by	Written by	Original release date	Prod. code	Viewers (millions)
98	1	"Episode I: The Baby Menace"	Terry Hughes	David M. Israel & Jim O'Doherty	September 21, 1999	501	14.95
The Solomons are relieved when Vicki's baby turns out to be human, but horrified when she announces her plans to sell her story to the papers. When a reporter comes sniffing around, Sally gives Dick the title of Security Officer and orders him to kill him; however he can't, so she makes him High Commander and herself Security Officer so that she can kill the reporter herself. Dick then reminds Sally that he is now the High Commander, and that there is nothing she can do to reverse it.
99	2	"Dick for Tat"	Terry Hughes	Bill Martin & Mike Schiff	September 28, 1999	502	11.25
When a drunk Mary tells Dick she once had a fling with his archenemy Vincent Strudwick, he is outraged and decides to get even with the pair of them by convincing Strudwick's wife to sleep with him. Tommy supports Dick's decision, imagining double dates - himself with Alissa and Dick with Strudwick's wife. Meanwhile, Sally gets the hots for Don after he starts riding a police motorbike, but the pair crash and Don ends up in full body plaster. (Absent: Elmarie Wendel as Mrs. Dubcek)
100	3	"The Fifth Solomon"	Terry Hughes	Gregg Mettler	November 2, 1999	505	10.88
Dick crashes the car into a tree and calls an insurance company to cover it, but the salesman informs him that in order to be covered, he needed to have taken out insurance before the crash. Instead, the salesman manages to convince Harry to buy insurance, but then ignores all of Harry's attempts to call him. Dick, meanwhile, is pleasantly surprised when he discovers just how much more advanced his rental car is than the old Rambler, and so sells the latter for scrap; however, the Solomons soon begin to miss it. Guest appearances by Bob Odenkirk and Joel McCrary. (Absent: Elmarie Wendel as Mrs. Dubcek)
101	4	"Dial M for Dick"	Terry Hughes	Christine Zander	November 9, 1999	504	9.54
Mary invites the Solomons on a murder mystery weekend, thinking that it might prove a fun activity. However, she goes down with food poisoning and retreats upstairs to her room. Downstairs, meanwhile, the Solomons are horrified when the first murder takes place, believing it to be real and, annoyed at the apparent lackadaisical efforts of Scotland Yard detective "Inspector McAffrey" (Billy Connolly), they decide to try to solve the mystery themselves. (Cameo appearances by Andrea Martin, J. Edward McKinley, Michael Bolton, Joel McCrary, Bob Odenkirk, Terry Bradshaw, Donny Osmond, Vondie Curtis-Hall and George Carlin). (Absent: Elmarie Wendel as Mrs. Dubcek)
102	5	"Dick and Tuck"	Terry Hughes	Bob Kushell	November 16, 1999	503	9.44
When Mary and Nina talk about how good looking Harrison Ford is, Dick decides that he himself is hideous and visits a plastic surgeon (David Hasselhoff) to discuss having his face surgically altered. However, when the surgeon tells Sally that she might benefit from having some plastic surgery herself, she becomes paranoid and believes herself not to be good enough for Don. Harry, meanwhile, is chuffed when the surgeon tells him that his face is perfect. Guest appearance by David Hasselhoff.
103	6	"Dick, Who's Coming to Dinner?"	Terry Hughes	Dave Goetsch & Jason Venokur	November 23, 1999	506	9.17
Dick is confused when Nina won't let him accompany her to her Black Student Union meeting, believing it to be a Weight Watchers type club; so, in an attempt to understand the concept, he mistakenly takes the Solomons to a racist white power rally. Dick realizes that the rally was a bad idea, and tries to make it up to Nina by firing her, to release her from what he calls her 'servile role' (as he and Mary's assistant), but she informs him that she is happy in her job. Meanwhile, Sally, Harry, and Tommy are preparing to take part in a poetry competition and decide to use racism as their subject. (Absent: Wayne Knight as Officer Don)
104	7	"Sex and the Sally"	Terry Hughes	Julie E. Sherman	November 30, 1999	509	9.92
Mary is horrified when she learns that Dick has been pocketing all the tip money she has left at restaurants, but Dick is baffled by the concept of tipping, and attempts to re-invent it by placing a stack of one dollar bills on the table and informing the waitress that when she pleases him, the pile will grow, and when not, it will shrink. Mary, however, informs him that this idea is demeaning. Meanwhile, Sally goes on the pill after Tommy informs her that she could become pregnant by having sex with Don, but begins to experience erratic mood swings and food cravings.
105	8	"Charitable Dick"	Terry Hughes	David Sacks	December 14, 1999	508	10.46
At a charity auction for the Rutherford Boys Home, Dick wants everybody to applaud him and so starts a bidding war with Studwick for a painting and ends up paying seventeen hundred dollars for it. Meanwhile, Don complains when Sally's snoring keeps him up all night, so she decides to try to stay awake all night so that he can sleep, but ends up keeping him awake anyway. Back at home, Harry and Tommy have been given the job of devising a new mission statement, and so try to work out what their purpose is on Earth. (Absent: Elmarie Wendel as Mrs. Dubcek)
106	9	"The Loud Solomon Family: A Dickumentary"	Terry Hughes	Valerie Watson	January 11, 2000	507	8.26
Mary reveals to Dick that she has been observing his family for a number of years and that she would like to make a documentary about them, in order to show how the 'typical American family' has changed. Unfortunately, Mary's film soon begins to create tension among the family and accusations that Dick is an abusive father, Tommy is a bed-wetter and Sally is secretly a lesbian start flying around, so Harry decides to become an alcoholic so as not to be left out. Guest appearance by Bob Morrisey.
107	10	"Gwen, Larry, Dick and Mary"	Terry Hughes	Christine Zander	January 25, 2000	512	8.28
Mary is tired of spending all of her time with Dick's family and so suggests that the pair befriend another couple - her tennis partner Gwen and her husband Larry. Dick is apprehensive but quickly warms to the pair; however, they soon start brushing he and Mary off, so Dick finds them at the tennis club, where they tell him that it's because they find Mary to be tedious and self-absorbed. Meanwhile, Sally, Harry and Tommy are forced to use the laundromat when their washing machine breaks down, and immediately fall in love with the place, even setting up a laundromat court, in which Sally, imitating several of the phrases and mannerisms of Judge Judy, settles squabbles over people's washing. (Absent: Wayne Knight as Officer Don)
108	11	"Dick Puts the 'ID' in Cupid"	Terry Hughes	Dave Goetsch & Jason Venokur	February 8, 2000	514	8.50
Valentine's Day is approaching and Tommy hopes to get a hotel room and lose his virginity to Alissa, however, he is nervous when he discovers that she is sexually experienced and so loses his virginity to Mary's niece Tiffany (Lindsey McKeon) first. Meanwhile, Dick discovers that Mary is seeing a therapist and, paranoid, he starts seeing her too, in order to find out what Mary has been saying about him. Paranoia fills Sally also, when Don gives her a gift which he teasingly says is from her 'secret admirer', and she mistakenly believes she has a stalker. (Absent: Elmarie Wendel as Mrs. Dubcek)
109	12	"The Big Giant Head Returns"	Terry Hughes	David Sacks	February 22, 2000	517	8.28
Vicki Dubcek returns with her baby Eric Travis, telling of how she has cleaned up her act and become a proper mother. Unfortunately, however, the Big Giant Head (William Shatner) decides to return to Earth and claim his son, but upon seeing Vicki with Eric, he falls in love with her and asks Dick to transform her hatred of him into love. Meanwhile, Harry admits that he is still in love with Vicki, but Dick tells him that he cannot have her because the Big Giant Head will punish him; while Tommy attempts to help Sally beat her addiction - shoes - by hipnosis. (Absent: Wayne Knight as Officer Don)
110	13	"Rutherford Beauty"	Terry Hughes	Bob Kushell & Gregg Mettler	February 22, 2000	511	8.78
Dick begins to have erotic fantasies about Nina, and makes the mistake of telling Mary about it, leading to an argument between the three of them. Dick is confused, and Don explains to him that his confession makes Mary feel as if she no longer excites him. Meanwhile, Sally falls under the spell of Margaret Williams, a lifestyle guru very similar to Martha Stewart, and an impressed Mary asks her to cater for a fund raiser she is holding. However, Sally becomes annoyed when the guests do not appreciate all the hard work she has put in. (Absent: Elmarie Wendel as Mrs. Dubcek)
111	14	"This Little Dick Went to Market"	Terry Hughes	Dave Boerger	March 14, 2000	518	8.01
After hearing of how well his colleagues are doing in the stock market, Dick claims that he has earned enough money to share a holiday with Mary in Cancun. As a result, Dick is forced buy into the market in order to actually pay for the holiday, but he soon begins to lose money when the company he invests in is rumored on CNN to have overspent. Meanwhile, Sally cannot stand it when a tougher woman than her arrives in town, in the form of police officer Janice (Chyna). Janice and Harry, however, take to each other. (Absent: Elmarie Wendel as Mrs. Dubcek)
112	15	"Youth is Wasted on the Dick"	Terry Hughes	Nastaran Dibai & Jeffrey B. Hodes	March 21, 2000	515	7.51
Dick tries to experience youth for the first time by partying with his students during spring break, but his drunken antics are wasted on Mary, who is trying to relive a favorite, and more relaxing, family outing. Meanwhile, Don and the police have moved into the Solomons' apartment in order to survey a video pirate living opposite. Sally is hugely turned on when she sees Don ordering his fellows about, but he is emasculated when tough government agent Jack McMannus (Miguel Ferrer) arrives and takes over the operation, and Sally becomes attracted to him.
113	16	"Dick Strikes Out"	Terry Hughes	Aron Abrams & Gregory Thompson	March 28, 2000	510	6.50
Pendelton University has a new chancellor, who causes anger when he cuts funding and takes away tenure, so Dick holds a meeting, in which he convinces the faculty to resign en masse. Unfortunately, the chancellor accepts the resignations and leaves everybody in the faculty, bar Dick - who withdrew his own, without a job. Upon finding out about his betrayal, the faculty protest outside Dick's classroom and Mary refuses to be seen with him. Meanwhile, Tommy begins working at a pretzel store with his girlfriend Alissa, but begins to dislike working with her and gives Sally and Harry free pretzels, with which they start their own business right in front of the store. (Absent: Elmarie Wendel as Mrs. Dubcek)
114	17	"Shall We Dick?"	Terry Hughes	Bill Martin & Mike Schiff	April 18, 2000	513	6.31
Dick and Mary are getting ready for the annual Rutherford Badger Day Dance Contest, but there's a small problem - Mary can't dance. Harry however has teamed up with Nina, but when Dick sees just how good a dancer she is, he orders Harry to let him dance with her instead. Meanwhile, Tommy and Don become exasperated when Alissa and Sally become friends and try on nearly everything in the clothes store. Jealousy arises, however, when Tommy discovers that Sally saw Alissa naked in the changing room, and then Sally discovers that Alissa accidentally walked in on Don changing in the Solomons' toilet. After Dick (and Nina) win the dance competition, the episode closes with a wordless pas de deux, complete with orchestral accompaniment of George Gershwin's "He Loves and She Loves", in a tribute to the final scene of the 1957 film Funny Face starring Fred Astaire and Audrey Hepburn. A portion of the film's choreography is re-created by Dick and Mary.
115	18	"Dick and Harry Fall Down a Hole"	Terry Hughes	Aron Abrams & Gregory Thompson	May 2, 2000	519	4.39
Dick and Harry fall into a large hole in the woods, which covers over when they attempt to climb out. Dick then panics, while Harry remains in a relaxed, zen-like state. A hole expert, named Angus 'The Hole' McDuff (Alan Cumming) is called to the scene and devises a plan to build a second hole in order to access the one Dick and Harry are stuck in; however he becomes highly offended when Sally belittles his idea.
116	19	"Frankie Goes to Rutherford"	Terry Hughes	Gregg Mettler & Will Forte	May 9, 2000	520	6.96
Frank (Enrico Colantoni), a former student of Mary's, returns for a lecture series, making Dick jealous, and paranoid that he is after her. When confronting Frank, however, he hints that he is gay, but Dick misreads him and is convinced that he is hinting at being an alien. Therefore, Dick begins to regularly accompany Frank to Geoffrey's Lounge, which he thinks is an alien bar. Meanwhile, Sally, Harry and Tommy receive a visit from Don, who has just inadvertently foiled a bank robbery, and decide to use their superior knowledge to rob a bank themselves. As the episode progresses, each of the Solomons dons a costume of one of the Village People (Dick as the construction worker, Harry as the indian, etc). At the end of the episode on their porch roof get-together, they are joined by Don in his police uniform to complete the tableau, and the episode ends to a Village People song.
117	20	"Dick Solomon's Day Off"	Terry Hughes	David M. Israel & Jim O'Doherty	May 16, 2000	516	6.79
It's a nice day and Dick doesn't want to be stuck in the workplace, so he decides to do something that he thinks has never been done before - fake a sick day. Mary soon finds out what he's up to and decides to join him, and the pair run into Strudwick, who is doing the same thing. Meanwhile, Sally, Harry and Tommy find a police scanner that Don has left lying around and begin listening to a woman named Andrea's phone conversations. Things take an interesting twist, however, when Harry begins dating her. (Absent: Elmarie Wendel as Mrs. Dubcek)
118	21	"The Big Giant Head Returns Again Part 1"	Terry Hughes	David Goetsch & Jason Venokur	May 23, 2000	521	8.29
The Big Giant Head and his new wife Vicki Dubcek arrive back on Earth, where the Big Giant Head takes Dick to a jazz club and admits that his marriage is troubled, and that he would like to get to know him better. As his overlord becomes increasingly more clingy, Dick begins to wonder what the reason behind it is. Meanwhile, Sally gets the wrong idea when she hears Alissa giving Tommy advice about his Valedictorian speech, and saying that it is a time to move on, and so, thinking that Tommy is about to get dumped, she finds Alissa and breaks up with her on his behalf. Harry finally asks Janice out on a date and the pair get together after a meal at the gym; however, Vicki is jealous, her old love for Harry stirring admits her troubled marriage. Guest appearance by Pat Morita. (Absent: Elmarie Wendel as Mrs. Dubcek)
119	22	"The Big Giant Head Returns Again Part 2"	Terry Hughes	Nastaran Dibai & Jeffrey B. Hodes	May 23, 2000	522	8.29
The Big Giant Head has revealed to Dick that he is his father, and so would like to get to know Mary better; however, Mary gets drunk at the dinner party and reveals that she has slept with over forty men in her lifetime. The Big Giant Head orders Dick to break up with Mary so he decides to run away with her, before Tommy reminds him that Earth children defy their parents all the time. Meanwhile, Vicki invites Harry's new girlfriend Janice to Tommy's graduation, where she attempts to kill her from beneath the bleachers; however, Sally quickly realizes what's going on and rushes to intervene before it is too late. The time comes for Tommy's speech, but he puts aside talking about his achievements to try to convince Alissa to forgive him. Meanwhile, Mary accidentally broke her own water, forcing Dick to go into labor with her, and she later gives birth to a healthy baby girl named Susan. (Absent: Elmarie Wendel as Mrs. Dubcek)
