= List of 3rd Rock from the Sun episodes =

This is an episode list for the American television sitcom 3rd Rock from the Sun, which ran from January 9, 1996 until May 22, 2001. During the course of the series, 139 episodes of 3rd Rock from the Sun aired over six seasons.

== Series overview ==
Season	Episodes	Originally released		Rank	Rating
Season	Episodes	First released	Last released	Rank	Rating
1	20	January 9, 1996	May 21, 1996	22	12.1
2	26	September 22, 1996	May 18, 1997	27	10.8
3	27	September 24, 1997	May 20, 1998	44	8.5
4	24	September 23, 1998	May 25, 1999	74	6.9
5	22	September 21, 1999	May 23, 2000	75	6.0
6	20	October 24, 2000	May 22, 2001	87	5.6

== Episodes ==
=== Season 1 (1996) ===
No. overall	No. in season	Title	Directed by	Written by	Original release date	Prod. code	Viewers (millions)
1	1	"Brains and Eggs"	James Burrows	Bonnie Turner & Terry Turner	January 9, 1996	101	23.0
2	2	"Post-Nasal Dick"	Robert Berlinger	Michael Glouberman & Andrew Orenstein	January 16, 1996	105	22.2
3	3	"Dick's First Birthday"	Robert Berlinger	Andy Cowan	January 23, 1996	106	21.8
4	4	"Dick Is from Mars, Sally Is from Venus"	Robert Berlinger	Bill Martin & Mike Schiff	January 30, 1996	103	20.1
5	5	"Dick, Smoker"	Robert Berlinger	Bill Martin & Mike Schiff	February 6, 1996	107	19.2
6	6	"Green-Eyed Dick"	Robert Berlinger	Joe Fisch	February 13, 1996	109	16.4
7	7	"Lonely Dick"	Robert Berlinger	Christine Zander	February 20, 1996	110	19.5
8	8	"Body & Soul & Dick"	Robert Berlinger	Bonnie Turner & Terry Turner	February 27, 1996	113	19.4
9	9	"Ab-dick-ted"	Robert Berlinger	Bob Kushell & Christine Zander	March 4, 1996	112	15.0
10	10	"Truth or Dick"	Robert Berlinger	Bonnie Turner & Terry Turner	March 12, 1996	102	19.7
11	11	"The Art of Dick"	Robert Berlinger	Bob Kushell	March 19, 1996	111	17.7
12	12	"Frozen Dick"	Robert Berlinger	Linwood Boomer	March 26, 1996	117	18.5
13	13	"Angry Dick"	Robert Berlinger	Linwood Boomer	April 2, 1996	104	17.6
14	14	"The Dicks They Are a Changin'"	Robert Berlinger	Michael Glouberman & Andrew Orenstein	April 9, 1996	108	18.7
15	15	"I Enjoy Being a Dick"	Robert Berlinger	Christine Zander	April 21, 1996	116	13.4
16	16	"Dick Like Me"	Robert Berlinger	Joe Fisch	April 23, 1996	115	16.7
17	17	"Assault with a Deadly Dick"	Robert Berlinger	Michael Glouberman & Andrew Orenstein	April 30, 1996	114	14.5
18	18	"Father Knows Dick"	Robert Berlinger	Bob Kushell	May 7, 1996	119	12.1
19	19	"Selfish Dick"	Robert Berlinger	David Sacks	May 14, 1996	120	12.5
20	20	"See Dick Run"	James Burrows	Bill Martin & Mike Schiff	May 21, 1996	118	12.4

=== Season 2 (1996–97) ===
No. overall	No. in season	Title	Directed by	Written by	Original release date	Prod. code	Viewers (millions)
21	1	"See Dick Continue to Run"	Robert Berlinger	Bill Martin & Mike Schiff	September 22, 1996	201	22.45
22	2	"See Dick Continue to Run"	Robert Berlinger	Bill Martin & Mike Schiff	September 22, 1996	202	22.45
23	3	"Hotel Dick"	Robert Berlinger	Bob Kushell	September 29, 1996	205	21.14
24	4	"Big Angry Virgin from Outer Space"	Robert Berlinger	Christine Zander	October 6, 1996	203	18.4
25	5	"Much Ado About Dick"	Robert Berlinger	Michael Glouberman & Andrew Orenstein	October 13, 1996	204	16.7
26	6	"Dick the Vote"	Robert Berlinger	Story by : Joe Fisch; Teleplay by : David Goetsch & Jason Venokur	October 27, 1996	207	15.6
27	7	"Fourth and Dick"	Robert Berlinger	Michael Glouberman & Andrew Orenstein	November 3, 1996	206	17.7
28	8	"World's Greatest Dick"	Robert Berlinger	David Goetsch & Jason Venokur	November 10, 1996	208	18.55
29	9	"My Mother the Alien"	Robert Berlinger	David M. Israel & Jim O'Doherty	November 17, 1996	209	19.66
30	10	"Gobble, Gobble, Dick, Dick"	Robert Berlinger	Bob Kushell & Christine Zander	November 24, 1996	210	18.6
31	11	"Dick Jokes"	Robert Berlinger	David M. Israel & Jim O'Doherty	December 8, 1996	211	15.2
32	12	"Jolly Old St. Dick"	Robert Berlinger	Bill Martin & Mike Schiff	December 15, 1996	212	19.17
33	13	"Proud Dick"	Robert Berlinger	David Sacks	January 5, 1997	213	18.65
34	14	"Romeo & Juliet & Dick"	Robert Berlinger	Bonnie Turner & Terry Turner	January 12, 1997	214	23.44
35	15	"Guilty as Dick"	Robert Berlinger	David Goetsch & Jason Venokur	February 2, 1997	215	18.39
36	16	"A Dick on One Knee"	Terry Hughes	Christine Zander	February 16, 1997	217	17.46
37	17	"Same Old Song and Dick"	Robert Berlinger	Katy Ballard	March 9, 1997	216	15.99
38	18	"I Brake for Dick"	Robert Berlinger	Gregg Mettler	March 16, 1997	218	15.06
39	19	"Dick Behaving Badly"	Robert Berlinger	Bob Kushell	March 23, 1997	219	15.76
40	20	"Dickmalion"	Robert Berlinger	Michael Glouberman & Andrew Orenstein	April 13, 1997	220	12.40
41	21	"Sensitive Dick"	Terry Hughes	David Sacks	April 27, 1997	221	14.89
42	22	"Will Work for Dick"	Terry Hughes	Dave Goetsch & Jason Venokur	May 4, 1997	223	12.95
43	23	"Fifteen Minutes of Dick"	Terry Hughes	David M. Israel & Jim O'Doherty	May 11, 1997	222	15.09
44	24	"Dick and the Single Girl"	Terry Hughes	Mark Brazill & Christine Zander	May 11, 1997	224	16.36
45	25	"A Nightmare on Dick Street"	Terry Hughes	Story by : Bonnie Turner & Terry Turner & David Sacks; Teleplay by : Bill Martin & Mike Schiff & Bob Kushell	May 18, 1997	225	20.15
46	26	"A Nightmare on Dick Street"	Terry Hughes	Story by : Bonnie Turner & Terry Turner & David Sacks; Teleplay by : Bill Martin & Mike Schiff & Bob Kushell	May 18, 1997	226	20.15

=== Season 3 (1997–98) ===
No. overall	No. in season	Title	Directed by	Written by	Original release date	Prod. code	Viewers (millions)
47	1	"Fun with Dick and Janet: Part 1"	Terry Hughes	Mark Brazill & Bob Kushell	September 24, 1997	301	16.37
48	2	"Fun with Dick and Janet: Part 2"	Terry Hughes	Mark Brazill & Bob Kushell	September 24, 1997	302	16.37
49	3	"Tricky Dick"	Terry Hughes	Bill Martin & Mike Schiff	October 8, 1997	305	11.94
50	4	"Dick-in-Law"	Terry Hughes	Christine Zander	October 15, 1997	304	9.83
51	5	"Scaredy Dick"	Terry Hughes	David Sacks	October 29, 1997	306	14.92
52	6	"Moby Dick"	Terry Hughes	Michael Glouberman & Andrew Orenstein	November 5, 1997	303	13.15
53	7	"Eleven Angry Men and One Dick"	Terry Hughes	David Goetsch & Jason Venokur	November 12, 1997	307	13.95
54	8	"A Friend in Dick"	Terry Hughes	Gregg Mettler	November 19, 1997	308	13.05
55	9	"Seven Deadly Clips"	Terry Hughes	Michael Glouberman & Andrew Orenstein	December 3, 1997	327	10.56
56	10	"Tom, Dick and Mary"	Terry Hughes	Terry Turner	December 3, 1997	309	11.62
57	11	"Jailhouse Dick"	Terry Hughes	David M. Israel & Jim O'Doherty	December 17, 1997	310	10.79
58	12	"Dick on a Roll"	Terry Hughes	David Goetsch & Jason Venokur	January 7, 1998	311	12.35
59	13	"The Great Dickdater"	Terry Hughes	David Sacks	January 21, 1998	312	11.21
60	14	"36! 24! 36! Dick: Part 1"	Terry Hughes	Bill Martin & Mike Schiff and Christine Zander	January 25, 1998	313	33.66
61	15	"36! 24! 36! Dick: Part 2"	Terry Hughes	Bill Martin & Mike Schiff and Christine Zander	January 25, 1998	314	33.66
62	16	"Pickles and Ice Cream"	Terry Hughes	Bob Kushell	January 28, 1998	315	15.39
63	17	"Auto Erodicka"	Terry Hughes	Mark Brazill	February 4, 1998	316	12.86
64	18	"Portrait of Tommy as an Old Man"	Terry Hughes	Bob Kushell & Gregg Mettler	February 25, 1998	318	9.71
65	19	"Stuck With Dick"	Terry Hughes	David M. Israel & Jim O'Doherty	March 18, 1998	317	11.88
66	20	"My Daddy's Little Girl"	Terry Hughes	Mark Brazill & Christine Zander	April 1, 1998	319	10.59
67	21	"The Physics of Being Dick"	Terry Hughes	David Schiff	April 15, 1998	323	10.99
68	22	"Just Your Average Dick"	Terry Hughes	Michael Glouberman & Andrew Orenstein	April 29, 1998	320	11.55
69	23	"Dick and the Other Guy"	Terry Hughes	Bonnie Turner & Terry Turner	April 29, 1998	321	11.55
70	24	"Sally and Don's First Kiss"	Terry Hughes	David Sacks	May 6, 1998	322	10.33
71	25	"When Aliens Camp"	Terry Hughes	Story by : Gregg Mettler; Teleplay by : David M. Israel & Jim O'Doherty	May 13, 1998	324	13.31
72	26	"The Tooth Harry"	Terry Hughes	Joshua Sternin & Jeffrey Ventimilia	May 20, 1998	325	10.60
73	27	"Eat, Drink, Dick, Mary"	Terry Hughes	Dave Goetsch and Jason Venokur	May 20, 1998	326	14.18

=== Season 4 (1998–99) ===
No. overall	No. in season	Title	Directed by	Written by	Original release date	Prod. code	Viewers (millions)
74	1	"Dr. Solomon's Traveling Alien Show"	Terry Hughes	Christine Zander	September 23, 1998	402	11.66
75	2	"Power Mad Dick"	Terry Hughes	David Sacks	October 7, 1998	401	9.70
76	3	"Feelin' Albright"	Terry Hughes	Bob Kushell	October 14, 1998	403	9.63
77	4	"Collect Call for Dick"	Terry Hughes	David M. Israel & Jim O'Doherty	October 21, 1998	404	9.42
78	5	"What's Love Got to Do, Got to Do With Dick?"	Terry Hughes	Bill Martin & Mike Schiff	October 28, 1998	405	9.26
79	6	"I Am Dick Pentameter!"	Terry Hughes	Dave Goetsch & Jason Venokur	November 4, 1998	406	10.76
80	7	"D3: Judgement Day"	Terry Hughes	Michael Glouberman & Andrew Orenstein	November 11, 1998	407	9.98
81	8	"Indecent Dick"	Terry Hughes	Bob Kushell	December 9, 1998	410	8.69
82	9	"Happy New Dick!"	Terry Hughes	Christine Zander	December 16, 1998	409	7.54
83	10	"Two-Faced Dick"	Terry Hughes	Gil Goldberg	January 5, 1999	411	11.64
84	11	"Dick Solomon of the Indiana Solomons"	Terry Hughes	Gregg Mettler	January 12, 1999	408	11.29
85	12	"Dick and Taxes"	Terry Hughes	Story by : Dennis Snee; Teleplay by : Michael Glouberman & Andrew Orenstein	February 2, 1999	415	10.08
86	13	"Sally Forth"	Terry Hughes	David Sacks	February 9, 1999	412	8.54
87	14	"Paranoid Dick"	Terry Hughes	David M. Israel & Jim O'Doherty	February 16, 1999	414	9.30
88	15	"The House That Dick Built"	Terry Hughes	Bill Martin & Mike Schiff	February 23, 1999	413	9.25
89	16	"Superstitious Dick"	Terry Hughes	Gregg Mettler	March 2, 1999	416	8.30
90	17	"Y2dicK"	Terry Hughes	Dave Goetsch & Jason Venokur	March 16, 1999	417	8.74
91	18	"Dick the Mouth Solomon"	Terry Hughes	Christine Zander & Bob Kushell	April 6, 1999	418	9.68
92	19	"Citizen Solomon"	Terry Hughes	Christ Atwood	April 27, 1999	420	7.82
93	20	"Alien Hunter"	Terry Hughes	Bonnie Turner & Terry Turner	May 4, 1999	422	12.48
94	21	"Dick vs. Strudwick"	Terry Hughes	Story by : Gregg Mettler; Teleplay by : David M. Israel & Jim O'Doherty	May 11, 1999	419	11.50
95	22	"Near Dick Experience"	Terry Hughes	Story by : David Sacks; Teleplay by : Dave Goetsch & Jason Venokur	May 18, 1999	421	10.25
96	23	"Dick's Big Giant Headache Part 1"	Terry Hughes	Bill Martin & Mike Schiff	May 25, 1999	423	8.11
97	24	"Dick's Big Giant Headache Part 2"	Terry Hughes	Michael Glouberman & Andrew Orenstein	May 25, 1999	424	8.11

=== Season 5 (1999–2000) ===
No. overall	No. in season	Title	Directed by	Written by	Original release date	Prod. code	Viewers (millions)
98	1	"Episode I: The Baby Menace"	Terry Hughes	David M. Israel & Jim O'Doherty	September 21, 1999	501	14.95
99	2	"Dick for Tat"	Terry Hughes	Bill Martin & Mike Schiff	September 28, 1999	502	11.25
100	3	"The Fifth Solomon"	Terry Hughes	Gregg Mettler	November 2, 1999	505	10.88
101	4	"Dial M for Dick"	Terry Hughes	Christine Zander	November 9, 1999	504	9.54
102	5	"Dick and Tuck"	Terry Hughes	Bob Kushell	November 16, 1999	503	9.44
103	6	"Dick, Who's Coming to Dinner?"	Terry Hughes	Dave Goetsch & Jason Venokur	November 23, 1999	506	9.17
104	7	"Sex and the Sally"	Terry Hughes	Julie E. Sherman	November 30, 1999	509	9.92
105	8	"Charitable Dick"	Terry Hughes	David Sacks	December 14, 1999	508	10.46
106	9	"The Loud Solomon Family: A Dickumentary"	Terry Hughes	Valerie Watson	January 11, 2000	507	8.26
107	10	"Gwen, Larry, Dick and Mary"	Terry Hughes	Christine Zander	January 25, 2000	512	8.28
108	11	"Dick Puts the 'ID' in Cupid"	Terry Hughes	Dave Goetsch & Jason Venokur	February 8, 2000	514	8.50
109	12	"The Big Giant Head Returns"	Terry Hughes	David Sacks	February 22, 2000	517	8.28
110	13	"Rutherford Beauty"	Terry Hughes	Bob Kushell & Gregg Mettler	February 22, 2000	511	8.78
111	14	"This Little Dick Went to Market"	Terry Hughes	Dave Boerger	March 14, 2000	518	8.01
112	15	"Youth is Wasted on the Dick"	Terry Hughes	Nastaran Dibai & Jeffrey B. Hodes	March 21, 2000	515	7.51
113	16	"Dick Strikes Out"	Terry Hughes	Aron Abrams & Gregory Thompson	March 28, 2000	510	6.50
114	17	"Shall We Dick?"	Terry Hughes	Bill Martin & Mike Schiff	April 18, 2000	513	6.31
115	18	"Dick and Harry Fall Down a Hole"	Terry Hughes	Aron Abrams & Gregory Thompson	May 2, 2000	519	4.39
116	19	"Frankie Goes to Rutherford"	Terry Hughes	Gregg Mettler & Will Forte	May 9, 2000	520	6.96
117	20	"Dick Solomon's Day Off"	Terry Hughes	David M. Israel & Jim O'Doherty	May 16, 2000	516	6.79
118	21	"The Big Giant Head Returns Again Part 1"	Terry Hughes	David Goetsch & Jason Venokur	May 23, 2000	521	8.29
119	22	"The Big Giant Head Returns Again Part 2"	Terry Hughes	Nastaran Dibai & Jeffrey B. Hodes	May 23, 2000	522	8.29

=== Season 6 (2000–01) ===
No. overall	No. in season	Title	Directed by	Written by	Original release date	Prod. code	Viewers (millions)
120	1	"Les Liaisons Dickgereuses"	Terry Hughes	Dave Goetsch & Jason Venokur	October 24, 2000	609	12.58
121	2	"Fear and Loathing in Rutherford"	Terry Hughes	Aron Abrams & Gregory Thompson	October 31, 2000	603	8.84
122	3	"InDickscretion"	Terry Hughes	Nastaran Dibai & Jeffrey B. Hodes	November 14, 2000	605	7.65
123	4	"Dick'll Take Manhattan Part 1"	Terry Hughes	Christine Zander & Mark Nutter	November 21, 2000	612	8.23
124	5	"Dick'll Take Manhattan Part 2"	Terry Hughes	Christine Zander & Mark Nutter	November 28, 2000	613	7.91
125	6	"Why Dickie Can't Teach"	Terry Hughes	Story by : David Sacks; Teleplay by : Joe Liss & David Lewman	December 5, 2000	606	7.46
126	7	"B.D.O.C."	Terry Hughes	Aron Abrams & Gregory Thompson	December 12, 2000	602	8.05
127	8	"Red, White & Dick"	Terry Hughes	Will Forte	December 19, 2000	604	6.83
128	9	"Dick Digs"	Terry Hughes	David M. Israel & Jim O'Doherty	January 9, 2001	601	7.91
129	10	"There's No Business Like Dick Business"	Terry Hughes	Dave Boerger	January 16, 2001	610	8.96
130	11	"A Dick Replacement"	Terry Hughes	Matt Silverstein & Dave Jeser	January 30, 2001	607	7.54
131	12	"Dick's Ark"	Terry Hughes	Danny Smith	February 6, 2001	608	8.12
132	13	"You Don't Know Dick"	Terry Hughes	Danny Smith	February 13, 2001	616	7.32
133	14	"My Mother, My Dick"	Terry Hughes	Nastaran Dibai & Jeffrey B. Hodes	February 20, 2001	611	7.66
134	15	"Glengarry Glen Dick"	Terry Hughes	Aron Abrams & Gregory Thompson	April 17, 2001	614	7.42
135	16	"Dick Soup for the Soul"	Terry Hughes	Sean Veder	May 1, 2001	615	5.58
136	17	"Mary Loves Scoochie: Part One"	Terry Hughes	Aron Abrams & Gregory Thompson & Dave Boerger	May 8, 2001	617	6.62
137	18	"Mary Loves Scoochie: Part Two"	Terry Hughes	Will Forte	May 15, 2001	618	6.18
138	19	"The Thing That Wouldn't Die: Part One"	Terry Hughes	Story by : Dave Lewman & Joe Liss; Teleplay by : Dave Jeser and Matt Silverstein	May 22, 2001	619	11.88
139	20	"The Thing That Wouldn't Die: Part Two"	Terry Hughes	Story by : Christine Zander; Teleplay by : Dave Goetsch & Jason Venokur	May 22, 2001	620	11.88
