= Brains and Eggs =

- 3rd Rock from the Sun episode
- Episode no.: Season 1 Episode 1
- Directed by: James Burrows
- Written by: Bonnie and Terry Turner
- Production code: 101
- Original air date: January 9, 1996

Guest appearances
- David DeLuise as Bug Pollone; Dan Gilvezan as Radio DJ; Chris Hogan as Aubrey Pitman; Susan Leslie as Kissing Woman; Ian Lithgow as Leon; Danielle Nicolet as Caryn; Marnette Patterson as Volleyball Girl; Jennifer Rhodes as Mrs. Sumner; Elmarie Wendel as Mrs. Mamie Dubcek

Episode chronology
← Previous —	Next → "Post-Nasal Dick"
- 3rd Rock from the Sun (season 1)

"Brains and Eggs" is the pilot episode of the American sitcom 3rd Rock from the Sun. The episode, which originally aired on NBC on January 9, 1996, depicts an extraterrestrial research expedition coming to Earth in the guise of what they think is a typical human family.

== Plot ==
In the town of Rutherford, Ohio, the aliens appear in their human forms aboard a 1963 Rambler convertible. The High Commander has become family patriarch Dick Solomon, the Security Officer is his sister Sally and the Information Officer (who is actually the oldest of the aliens) has become Tommy, Dick's teenage son. Another alien, who has no obvious purpose yet, has taken on the form of Dick's brother Harry.

The first discovery they all make is that none of them can swivel their heads around a hundred and eighty degrees and thus cannot lick their backs. Shortly thereafter, Dick scrounges up a job as a physics professor at nearby Pendelton State University and the aliens rent a loft apartment from Mrs. Mamie Dubcek, who remains their landlady for the rest of the series. At work, Dick becomes smitten with Dr. Mary Albright, an anthropology professor with whom he shares an office.

When he accidentally upsets Mary, he discovers emotions, of which the aliens previously had no knowledge. Intrigued and confused by the concept, Dick takes the family to a party at the dean's house, where he apologizes to Mary there and she somewhat returns his affections. He later tells the rest of his crew that humans must be more complex than they ever thought and decides they will remain on Earth to further study the human condition. The rest of the aliens believe he actually wants to stay due to his infatuation with Mary, but Dick has his way since he is High Commander.

== Reception ==
Reviews of the pilot were mixed and it was criticized for its abundant sex jokes, which were seen as "cheap". The Daily News of Los Angeles reported that "as terrific as Lithgow is in his first weekly series, the show arrives dressed as one colossal breast joke." Some critics compared the series to the short-lived Champs, which debuted on the same day.

The episode was watched by 23 million viewers.

== Differences in the sets ==
The sets seen in this episode are markedly different from those used later in the show's run. For instance, the Solomons' loft apartment does not have a staircase and the room is instead entered through the door that would later lead to Dick's bedroom. In Dick and Mary's office, Dick has the desk that would later become Mary's and vice versa. Also, most of the set dressing in the office is different and it is entered through the door that later leads to Nina's office. The sets were altered in "Truth or Dick", the next episode to be filmed, and they remained largely unchanged for the remainder of the show's run.

== Background ==
This episode is actually the second version of the pilot to be filmed. Originally, Dick's love interest was to be a secretary, but, after the first pilot, it became apparent to the show's producers that the aliens bounced off everything and that "straight" comic foils were required. The love interest was subsequently rewritten to be a fellow professor and a new character, Nina Campbell, became the secretary. Nina was added since it was thought that an "edge in the office" was needed. Jane Curtin and Simbi Khali joined the cast two weeks after the rest of the regulars.
