= The Thing That Wouldn't Die =

- 3rd Rock from the Sun episodes
- Episode nos.: Season 6 Episodes 19/20
- Directed by: Terry Hughes
- Story by: Dave Lewman & Joe Liss (part 1); Christine Zander (part 2)
- Teleplay by: Dave Jeser and Matt Silverstein (part 1); Dave Goetsch & Jason Venokur (part 2)
- Production code: 619/620
- Original air date: May 22, 2001

Guest appearance
- Elvis Costello (Himself)

Episode chronology
← Previous "Mary Loves Scoochie: Part 2"	Next → —
- 3rd Rock from the Sun (season 6)

"The Thing That Wouldn't Die" is the two-part series finale of the American sitcom 3rd Rock from the Sun. The episode aired on May 22, 2001 on NBC. The action in the episode directly follows that of the previous two-parter "Mary Loves Scoochie", which ended with Dick transforming Dr. Liam Neesam, a malevolent alien played by John Cleese, into a chimpanzee. Therefore, the full finale involves a four-episode story arc.

== Plot ==
=== Part 1 ===
In the previous episode, Mary sees how Dick defeats Liam, and becomes distrusting of Dick. After being convinced by Nina and Judith, Mary breaks off her relationship with Dick. In response, Dick reveals his true identity to her. At first she doesn't believe him, but is ultimately convinced after Dick tells her to reflect on his unorthodox behavior over the years.

At the scene of a robbery, Sally discovers Don hiding in a freezer. In an attempt to give him more courage, Sally inadvertently pushes him to quit the force and start a muffin shop.

Harry meets a woman named Sam working at the store that was robbed, and makes a date with her later that evening. Harry later sees Sam working at fancy restaurant, but she instructs him to call her Samantha due to the setting. This confuses Harry, leading him to believe he's dating twins. When she arrives at the apartment later, he scrambles around trying to keep the two women apart before it all blows up in his face.

Liam complains about Dick's transgression to the Big Giant Head, who orders Dick and the family back to their home planet for taking unauthorized hostile action against a fellow alien.

=== Part 2 ===
The family resigns themselves to the fact that they'll be leaving Earth, but Dick decides he's going to ask Mary to come with them.

Sally reveals to Don that she's a security specialist, and puts him through a crash personality alteration course in an effort to improve his effectiveness as a police officer, and guide him back to the force, making their parting one of respect and camaraderie rather than one of lost love.

Harry and Tommy throw a space themed party for the family by running up their credit cards. This party sees many of the series regular side characters gathering at the apartment. Tommy feigns ambivalence about the mission's end but when left alone in the kitchen he loses his normally cool demeanor and breaks down into uncontrollable sobbing over the team's pending departure. The party culminates with a performance of "Fly Me to the Moon" by Elvis Costello.

In the ending moments of the series, the family sits in the Rambler and the same spot where they first appeared, and discuss all the things they're going to miss on Earth, which prompts Mary to panic and decide that she can't go with them. Dick escorts her out of the Rambler and agrees to perform a memory-wiping technique on her, one that erases her memories of him but leaves the feelings associated with their love still in her mind. Harry leaves his coat behind for Mary to lie on until she regains consciousness.

The family sits in the Rambler, and Sally begins to cry. Tommy and Harry begin to sing their mission song. Sally and Dick join in, and as the song reaches its crescendo, the four of them beam away.

=== Alternate ending ===
A cliffhanger was filmed to leave open the possibility for the series to return. In this version, first aired in syndication, the episode continues after the family is beamed away. The brainwashed Mary wakes up, sees the Rambler and feels the key in her hand, and in a state of delirium, enters the car and puts the key in the ignition. Suddenly, a naked Dick appears in the passenger seat and tells Mary "I couldn't leave without you", although Mary has no memory of him. Upon realizing this, Dick screams "Alien abduction! Alien abduction!" and then beams himself and Mary aboard the mother-ship.

== Cast ==
- John Lithgow as Dick Solomon
- French Stewart as Harry Solomon
- Kristen Johnston as Sally Solomon
- Joseph Gordon-Levitt as Tommy Solomon
- Simbi Khali as Nina Campbell
- Elmarie Wendel as Mamie Dubcek
- Wayne Knight as Don Orville
- Jane Curtin as Dr. Mary Albright

=== Recurring cast ===
- Ian Lithgow as Leon
- David DeLuise as Bug Polland
- Chris Hogan as Aubrey Pitman
- Danielle Nicolet as Caryn
- Ileen Getz as Dr. Judith Draper
- Ron West as Dr. Vincent Strudwick

== Production ==
Before the episode aired, John Lithgow told the press, "We end it in a blaze of glory. It was 139 episodes, laughing all the way. I must say the feeling is melancholy; we really did love it all the way up to the end. But in the final scene, the emotions from the actors (especially John Lithgow, French Stewart) were genuine as they really were upset about the series coming to a close. I am on to the next, and quite excited about my next big project."

The finale was watched by 11.88 million viewers, ranking 18th for the week.

== Reception ==
The finale received mixed reviews from both fans and critics alike. The Boston Herald's Monica Collins said it was "charming", and Mike Duffy of the Detroit Free Press called it "sublimely ridiculous to the end, shamelessly silly and proud of it". However, Entertainment Weekly gave the episode a C, and Alan Pergament of The Buffalo News wrote, "Save a scene in which Mary has a variety of facial expressions when Dick asks her to think back about their lives together while imagining he is an alien, the episode is less than memorable." Joe Amarante of the New Haven Register said that Elvis Costello's performance was "somewhat wooden".

Despite this, it was the most watched episode of the season.
