= List of 3rd Rock from the Sun characters =

Below is a list of characters in the U.S. television comedy series 3rd Rock from the Sun:

== Cast ==
Actor	Character	Seasons					
Actor	Character	1	2	3	4	5	6
John Lithgow	Dick Solomon	Main	Main	Main	Main	Main	Main
Kristen Johnston	Sally Solomon	Main	Main	Main	Main	Main	Main
French Stewart	Harry Solomon	Main	Main	Main	Main	Main	Main
Jane Curtin	Mary Albright	Main	Main	Main	Main	Main	Main
Joseph Gordon Levitt	Tommy Solomon	Main	Main	Main	Main	Main	Recurring
Simbi Khali	Nina Campbell	Recurring	Recurring	Main	Main	Main	Main
Elmarie Wendel	Mamie Dubcek	Recurring	Recurring	Main	Main	Main	Main
Wayne Knight	Don Orville	Guest	Recurring	Main	Main	Main	Main

== Main characters ==
=== Dr. Richard "Dick" Solomon ===
(Portrayed by John Lithgow; seasons 1-6) Though the High Commander and head of the expedition to Earth, Dick is often the most childlike member of the group, being the youngest of the crew, despite being the oldest family member (at least appearing to be the oldest due to his body). Much of the behavioral or societal-based troubles faced by the crew in their mission while on Earth frequently arise from some juvenile act perpetrated by Dick, troubles which in turn must be overcome by the entire troupe with a great deal of reluctance.

=== Salome "Sally" Solomon ===
(Portrayed by Kristen Johnson; seasons 1-6) With a rank of lieutenant, Sally is the security officer and second-in-command. She has been called Dick's sister, but was sometimes introduced as Tommy's sister earlier in the series, and, on one occasion, claimed to be his mother, although never Dick's daughter and certainly not his spouse; failure to clarify the exact relationship between Tommy, Harry, and Sally led to humorous confusion whenever either Harry or Sally attempted to act as Tommy's guardian. Sally was chosen to be the woman because she apparently lost some sort of contest and was not too thrilled about it; while the alien species is described as asexual, Sally seems to have a harder time trying to figure out womanhood than the others do manhood. She files a request to be made male early in the mission, though later decides she liked being a woman. A later episode had Dick and her switching bodies on orders from the Big Giant Head, which caused much confusion both on their parts, as they had gotten used to their respective genders while on Earth, as well as the other characters, as they could not get used to Sally acting like Dick and vice versa.

=== Harold S. "Harry" Solomon ===
(Portrayed by French Stewart; seasons 1-6) Originally, Harry was not part of the mission. He happened to go for the ride because an extra seat was available. Later, it is revealed that he has a chip in his head that allows The Big Giant Head to communicate the crew. When this happens, he shakes violently and gurgles while standing in a squatting position, with his arms at 90° angles, declaring "Incoming message from The Big Giant Head!". These broadcasts always end with a sneeze, with Harry resuming to normal and having no idea what had just been transmitted. He poses as Dick and Sally's brother, and Tommy's uncle. He is often known to be the simplest family member. He is considered by the others to be dim-witted, leading to him being impulsive and misunderstanding people. However, his gentle nature and unassuming manner makes it easier for him to get along with humans than it does for the other Solomons. While the rest of the family considers him to be unattractive, he easily has more romantic success than them combined. He is often mocked for his inability to open his eyelids properly, requiring him to tilt his head back to look at people his own height.

=== Thomas Alfred "Tommy" Solomon ===
(Portrayed by Joseph Gordon-Levitt; main: seasons 1-5; recurring: season 6) Information officer and third-in-command behind Sally. Even though he is the oldest and smartest of the entire crew, Tommy plays the role of Dick's adolescent son. The Solomons never remember to come up with a cover story for why Tommy has no mother, and are always caught off-guard when asked. It is implied that Tommy and Dick are long-time friends, but their roles as child and parent puts serious strain on them both. Tommy struggles to cope with his teenage body's ever-changing hormones, something that he has never encountered before. He tends to be bluntly honest, and does not understand he has done wrong until someone has a negative emotional reaction. He has an on-off relationship with August which is usually frustrated by his lack of emotional awareness, and attraction to almost any fertile female he encounters. Gordon-Levitt left the series (after the fifth season concluded) as a primary character, only appearing as a recurring character in just over half the episodes of season six. In the show, this is explained by Tommy's graduating from high school and moving out to college. In the final episode, he has an unusually emotional reaction when he discovers that the mission is over and they must leave earth.

=== Dr. Mary Albright ===
(Portrayed by Jane Curtin; seasons 1-6) Dick's colleague and on-and-off girlfriend, Mary is aware that Dick is an insensitive idiot, but appreciates his joie de vivre and quirkiness. Reference is often made to the insecurity caused by her bad parenting, and the fact that before Dick arrived, she was known for sleeping around, and had even been nicknamed "Dr. Slutbunny".

=== Officer Donald Leslie "Don" Orville ===
Officer Donald Leslie "Don" Orville is portrayed by Wayne Knight and works as a Police Sergeant in the fictional town of Rutherford, Ohio, though he is consistently referred to as "Officer" throughout the series. He is often shown to be somewhat incompetent. In The Physics of Being Dick, he lets Dick interrogate a criminal with him, despite it being highly illegal. When he is paged, he never appears to know what any of the crime codes mean.

Don is known to make blunders, for example, in Stuck With Dick, when he thinks Mary's house has been broken into, he bursts in through the front door shouting "Ass right there, freeze hole!" In Dick's Big Giant Headache, Part II, he also claims to be always losing things, adding "I even lost a whole dead guy once”.

Throughout the series, he maintains an on-off relationship with Sally Solomon, a strong woman able to persuade him to do anything she wants. As an ongoing gag, one of the pair is always able to tell when the other has entered the room, where Don will gaze at Sally lustfully and say "Hello Sally" and she gazes at him in a sultry way and answers, "Hi Don." Another running gag for the pair is that their conversations tend to be somewhat dramatic, and reminiscent of an old film noir 1950s crime drama.

As the final season draws to a close, he hides in a frozen food freezer during the robbery of a local store, admitting that he is a coward who only joined the police force because he thought he'd be safe around all the other officers. He subsequently retires from the Rutherford Police Department to open a muffin shop before being convinced to re-enlist. Eventually, Don is rehired at the rank of Police Officer.

=== Mamie Dubcek ===
(Portrayed by Elmarie Wendel; main: seasons 3-6; recurring: seasons 1-2) Mrs. Mamie Dubcek (usually referred to as 'Dubcek' by the Solomon family) is the landlady who rents an attic apartment to the Solomon family for the duration of the series.

Mrs. Dubcek lives below the Solomon family and is portrayed as a loose and carefree woman who is prone to having many sexual partners. For this reason, she often acts as a bizarre and unlikely guide for the Solomons in handling problems in their love lives.

Mrs. Dubcek's daughter Vicki is introduced in the Thanksgiving episode, Gobble, Gobble, Dick, Dick. During this episode, Vicki is established as a love interest for Harry, and as the series progresses, the pair consider having a baby together, before the Big Giant Head intervenes and impregnates Vicki himself. Mrs. Dubcek also has an unnamed son, as mentioned in the Season 2 episode, My Mother the Alien. She apparently has an illegitimate granddaughter named Melanie, possibly from her aforementioned unnamed son, in the Season 2 episode, Will Work for Dick.

Although Mrs. Dubcek is unmarried throughout the course of the series, she often refers to former husbands. In the episode Dick Like Me she describes her ethnicity as "a little Czech, a little Romanian; I'm your basic Slavic mutt."

=== Nina Campbell ===
(Portrayed by Simbi Khali; main: seasons 3-6; recurring: seasons 1-2) Nina is the professional assistant of Dr. Mary Albright and Dr. Dick Solomon at the fictional Pendelton State University. At times, she and Dr. Albright are friends, while at others they seem to dislike each other. She stated in the episode "Dick, Who's Coming To Dinner" that she is a student of Pendelton.

Nina does not usually get on with Dick but eventually he grows on her. She quits working for him in the episode "Will Work for Dick", which causes him a great deal of angst and resulting in his hiring and firing Harry. He convinces her to return to him in the end of the episode.

Sally tends to regard Nina and Vicki Dubcek as her two best friends and is often seen asking them for advice and discussing her problems. In one episode, she moves in with Nina and they share an Odd Couple-like relationship until Sally moves back to the loft.

Nina is sarcastic in dealing with both Mary and Dick and was particularly angry when Mary's promotion left her with just Dick to manage. Despite this, Nina can be kind to both of them, particularly to Mary whom she encourages to be more firm with Dick. It was Nina who encouraged Mary to stop tormenting Dick and go out with him in the episode "See Dick Run".

== Recurring characters ==
=== Dr. Judith Draper ===
(Portrayed by Ileen Getz) Judith Draper is a fictional character in 3rd Rock from the Sun. She is the professor of Women's Studies at the fictional Pendelton State University. She appeared in a promotional video for Pendelton, alongside Dick's son Tommy (who played a teenager saying he is applying for Pendelton) after Dick and Mary, the original stars of the video, sabotaged the entire production.

Little is shown about Judith's life, as she is usually seen in purely academic situations, such as in the office or at Pendelton staff meetings or parties. She is known for her husky and unrestrained laugh after she makes a joke, although nobody else laughs at her jokes. She generally speaks in monotone.

Judith was shown to be neurotic, cynical, and possibly a closeted lesbian. She claimed to have a boyfriend named Trent, but Mary believes that he's imaginary. She admitted that she once believed there was a hidden camera in the ladies restroom at Pendelton, and even went as far as to dismantle the ceiling tiles in her search for it.

=== August Leffler ===
(Portrayed by Shay Astar) August Leffler is Tommy's first steady girlfriend. She has a habit of demanding a lot of Tommy while not always giving anything in return. However, he attempts to break up with her a couple of times to pursue other women (e.g. one of which is his music teacher in the episode "Fourth and Dick" in Season Two). They continue to hang out together until she decides to move on (third-season episode "Moby Dick"). She confirms this in the fourth-season episode "Citizen Solomon" when confronted by Tommy. This is part of a story arc that involves all the aliens breaking up with their significant others. However, while the other broken relationships (Dick and Mary, Sally and Don, etc.) are ultimately resolved, Tommy and August's is not. In the fourth season, Tommy begins dating Alissa Strudwick, who soon takes August's place on the show.

In the episode "Just Your Average Dick", August reveals that her family is of Dutch ancestry; her grandparents, Lucien and Mona, emigrated to the United States on a schooner in 1852.

August is an icy and disdainful female, a scholar and a feminist. She tended to play games with Tommy, making sure he would come at her beck and call. Like Tommy, August was a studious high schooler, but she was also contemptuous of prettier girls whom she regarded as shallow and unintelligent. She was known for being able to easily manipulate Tommy and was clearly the one in charge of their relationship, treating him as more of a pet than a boyfriend. For instance, in her first episode "Lonely Dick," she told Tommy, who was unsure when it would be appropriate to be physically intimate with her, that she would "decide that as we go along."

August was often shown to have a lot of the same highbrow interests as Tommy does, and her perceived intellectual superiority over him, yet this seemed to give her a degree of elitism. She was also known for her rather quaint neo-feminist views, such as her belief, stated in "I Brake for Dick," that cosmetics are a way for men to "decorate the women they own and turn them into vacuous playthings." She seemed to also have similarly unusual opinions about other topics (according to Tommy in "I Enjoy Being a Dick," August got out of the Girl Scouts because she thought the cookie selling verged on racketeering).

August eventually left Tommy due to her annoyance with what she regarded as his immaturity. She was seeing another boy, Joe, behind his back. August appeared in two fourth-season episodes after Tommy began dating Alissa, the first of which was "Citizen Solomon". In the following episode, "Alien Hunter", she appeared as a guest at Dick's birthday party, but didn't have any lines. Her appearance in this episode (as well as Alissa's absence) wasn't explained.

=== Vincent Strudwick ===
(Portrayed by Ron West) Vincent Strudwick is first a friend, and later the arch-enemy of Dick. In the first seasons of the show, Dick and Strudwick appeared to be friends, and were seen playing physics-related games together in the second season episode Dick Behaving Badly. Also, in the fourth season episode Power Mad Dick, Mary is made Dean of the School of Arts and Sciences and Dick believes that this gives him her authority, and one of the changes he makes is giving Strudwick a pay raise.

Strudwick's rivalry with Dick came into play after he released a bestselling book about physics, and Dick, as another physics teacher, became jealous of his achievement and from then on appeared to detest him. In the season five episode Dick For Tat it was revealed that Mary had had a fling with Strudwick. Their rivalry continued until the very last episode of the series, in which the aliens held an alien-themed farewell party, that Dick misled Strudwick into arriving at dressed for a masquerade ball recreating the court of King Louis XIV.

=== Alissa Strudwick ===
(Portrayed by Larisa Oleynik) Alissa Strudwick becomes Tommy's long-time girlfriend after he breaks up with August. She's the daughter of Vincent Strudwick, a colleague of Dick, at Pendelton State University.

Alissa first appears in "Indecent Dick," sitting in Tommy's science class. Alissa and Tommy are mutually attracted, but are too shy to do anything about it. After Alissa catches a cold, Tommy brings her chicken soup and Alissa asks if Tommy always gives chicken soup to girls he likes, to which Tommy replies, with a "macho" attitude: "I don't like you." However, in "Sally Forth" Tommy gets himself sent to detention class so he can ask Alissa out on a date. When Tommy refers to Alissa as his girlfriend, Harry calls him crazy, so Tommy decides to prove it by joining Alissa babysitting at the Wheelers' house. This turns out to be a disaster, because Harry and Vicki come in, having a huge argument about having a baby together. But after this, Tommy and Alissa become boyfriend and girlfriend.

When Tommy becomes class valedictorian, he and Alissa discuss what he should say in his end speech. Sally accidentally overhears Alissa suggesting something about moving on and saying goodbye to friends and because of this she thinks that Alissa wants to break up with Tommy. Sally decides that she should dump Alissa, for Tommy, before Alissa dumps him. Tommy gets mad at Sally after she tells him that she broke up with Alissa for him because she was going to dump him. When Tommy tries to talk to Alissa, she explains to him that she was not going to dump him, and after graduation, they two still continue to date. During a summer weekend, he gets Alissa to watch a scary movie with him, hoping that she needed a big strong man to hold on to. This plan is ruined by Harry and Sally trying to make the movie scarier and by Dick, Strudwick and Albright who thought that Tommy and Alissa ran away from home together, but she forgives him when Tommy tearfully confesses to everything.

=== The Big Giant Head ===
The Big Giant Head is their boss. In early seasons he's referenced but not seen. When he eventually is seen onscreen, he's played by William Shatner, who is famous from the science fiction show Star Trek.

=== Vicki Dubcek ===
(Portrayed by Jan Hooks) Vicki Dubcek, daughter of Ms. Dubcek, Harry's on-and-off girlfriend and later the wife of the Big Giant Head and the mother of his child.

Vicki has a colourful past with multiple sexual partners. She attempts to clean up her life at times, once by going celibate after becoming a massage therapist, but apparently only seems to find stability with Harry. That is until she becomes pregnant by the Big Giant Head.

After marrying the Big Giant Head and having his child, she travels the universe with him. At one point she returns and tries to get Harry back by killing his new girlfriend Janice, however that plan in thwarted and she returns to the Big Giant Head.

=== Leon ===
Leon is one of Dick's students. He is played by Ian Lithgow, the real life son of the show's lead actor, John Lithgow.

=== Bug Pollone ===
(Portrayed by David DeLuise) Bug Pollone is one of Dick's students.

=== Caryn ===
(Portrayed by Danielle Nicolet) Caryn is one of Dick's students.

=== Aubrey Pitman ===
(Portrayed by Chris Hogan) Aubrey Pitman is one of Dick's students.

=== Dr. Liam Neesam ===
(Portrayed by John Cleese; seasons 3 and 6) Dr. Liam Neesam is a professor who briefly has a relationship with Mary, and is later revealed to be an evil alien.

=== Janice ===
(Portrayed by Chyna) Janice is a muscular female police officer who is briefly Harry's girlfriend.

Sally is jealous of her perceived strength and attempts to wrestle her, but realizes she and Janice have a lot in common after Janice reveals her soft side that others fail to see due to her appearance.

=== Coach Strickland ===
(Portrayed by Michael Milhoan) Coach Strickland is a high school physical education teacher at Tommy's high school.

== Guest stars ==
=== Season 1 ===
- Harry Morgan - (3 episodes, seasons 1 & 2) playing Professor Suter, an elderly colleague of Dick and Mary
- Martha Stewart - playing herself
- Phil Hartman - (seasons 1 & 3) playing a camp cosmetics store worker and Randy, Vicki Dubcek's ex-lover
- Jane Lynch - playing Tommy's science teacher, Ms. Koppel
- Ed Begley Jr. - playing Jeff
- John Mahoney - playing Leonard Hamlin, a rude, sexist professor
- Lauren Graham - playing Laurie Ives
- John Raitt - playing Singing Truck Driver
- Katherine LaNasa - playing single mother
- Bronson Pinchot - playing Mary's brother, Roy Albright
- Marla Sokoloff - playing Dina, Tommy's lab partner and love interest

=== Season 2 ===
- Dennis Rodman - playing himself; it is revealed that he is actually another alien
- George Takei - playing himself at a sci-fi convention
- Al Franken - playing Harry's opponent in the City Council election
- Mike Ditka - playing Coach Mafferty; coach for Pendelton Badgers
- Mark Hamill - playing himself
- Christine Baranski - playing Sonja Umdahl
- Randy Newman - playing himself
- Dick Martin-playing sociology professor Dr. Ben Littmeyer
- Greg Proops - playing Yasmine; Dick's sensitivity trainer

=== Season 3 ===
- Roseanne Barr - playing Dick's forced-wife Janet
- Leigh McCloskey - playing Matthew, a yoga instructor
- Elaine Stritch - (seasons 3 & 6) playing Martha Albright, Mary's mother
- George Grizzard - (seasons 3 & 4) playing George Albright, Mary's Father
- Cindy Crawford - playing Mascha, a Venusian woman
- Angie Everhart - playing Chloe, A Venusian woman dating Tommy
- Dom DeLuise - playing the father of Dick's student Bug
- Peter DeLuise - playing Franky
- John Cleese - (seasons 3 & 6) playing Professor Liam Neesam, a hostile alien
- Sam Lloyd - playing Eddie, a man Dick helps.

=== Season 4 ===
- Laurie Metcalf - playing Jennifer Ravelli, a teacher of comparative literature
- Kathy Bates - playing Charlotte Everley, an alien hunter
- Gil Christner - playing Carl, a Nobel Laureate
- William Shatner - (seasons 4 & 5) playing The Big Giant Head (a.k.a. Stone Phillips)
- Aaron Paul - (Season 4) Playing the Junior Prom King & Queen announcer
- Kurtwood Smith (Season 4) Playing Dick's "cousin" Jacob when they attend a Solomon family reunion
- Bryan Cranston - Plays a Neil Diamond Impersonator (whom Sally kisses) Season 4 Episode 14
- Emily Osment - Plays Dahlia

=== Season 5 ===
- Billy Connolly - playing an actor who is playing the part of Inspector McAffrey
- David Hasselhoff - playing a plastic surgeon
- Jonathan Frakes - playing Larry McMichael, the husband of Mary's friend Gwen
- Genie Francis - playing Gwen McMichael, the wife of Larry McMichael
- Chyna - playing Janice, a police officer
- Miguel Ferrer - playing Jack McMannus, a government agent
- Alan Cumming - playing Angus 'The Hole' McDuff, a hole expert
- Enrico Colantoni - playing Frank, an ex-student of Mary's
- Bob Odenkirk - plays as Gary Parkinson an insurance salesman in "The Fifth Solomon" (episode 3 season 5)
- Olivia d'Abo - playing Andrea, woman overheard on police scanner (episode 20)

=== Season 6 ===
- Megan Mullally - playing Renata Albright, Mary's sister
- Elvis Costello - playing himself
- Mark McKinney - Playing a new alien that stumbled through the Solomon's closet door.
- Andrea Speyer - Guest Star as Claire Volk
