= A Savannah Haunting =

- Directed by: William Mark McCullough
- Written by: William Mark McCullough
- Produced by: Alexis Nelson; William Mark McCullough; Christina DeRosa; Guido Grimaldi; Matthew Imes
- Starring: Gena Shaw; Anna Harriette Pittman; Tommi Rose
- Cinematography: Paul Marschall
- Edited by: Christopher Cibelli
- Production companies: Fort Argyle Films; D.I.G. Entertainment
- Distributed by: Vertical Entertainment
- Release date: April 8, 2021
- Running time: 105 minutes
- Country: United States
- Language: English

A Savannah Haunting is a 2021 American supernatural horror film directed by William Mark McCullough. It is based on actual events that occurred in Savannah, Georgia, and is shot at the location of the same house where it happened.

== Plot ==
The family moves to Savannah in the hope of starting life with a clean slate. Then a dead girl named Alice kept appearing to be Rachel’s daughter that died drowning but it wasn’t Rachel’s daughter at all. It was an entity of a girl that died there a long time ago.

== Cast ==
- Gena Shaw as Rachel Rancourt
- Anna Harriette Pittman as April Rancourt
- Tommi Rose as Lilath
- Simbi Khali as Josephine
- William Mark McCullough as William
- Nico Tirozzi as Andrew Rancourt
- Bill Winkler as Dr. Livingston
- Jaelyn Buffkin as Alice
- Dean J. West as Eric Rancourt
- Moses Jones as James
- Brittney Level as Vanessa
- Stephanie Lusk Donahue as EMT
