= Tommy Solomon (3rd Rock from the Sun) =

- Joseph Gordon-Levitt as Tommy Solomon
- First appearance: "Brains and Eggs"
- Last appearance: "The Thing That Wouldn't Die (Part 2)"
- Created by: Bonnie and Terry Turner
- Portrayed by: Joseph Gordon-Levitt

In-universe information
- Species: Extraterrestrial
- Gender: Male (in human form)
- Title: Information Officer
- Occupation: Information officer Student

Tommy Solomon is a fictional character created by Bonnie and Terry Turner from the American sitcom 3rd Rock from the Sun. He was portrayed by Joseph Gordon-Levitt.

== Ironic age ==
When the Solomons originally arrived on Earth, Tommy, despite being the oldest of the aliens, was given the body of a teenage boy. Despite having to act like a kid all the time, Tommy's real age shines through, particularly when he plays the role of mentor to High Commander Dick, ostensibly Tommy's father while on Earth. During one episode, Tommy announces he has retired from the mission, and starts behaving like a stereotypical old man, even hanging out at the old folks' home (where he poses as one of the resident's nephews). As Information Officer, Tommy is the smartest and most Earth-savvy of the Solomons, and he is charged with gathering information about humans, mainly from television shows and films. In season 6, Tommy moves out to attend college but his character continues to be in the rest of the series.

== Alternate universe ==
In the episode "Dick'll Take Manhattan", in which Dick, Harry and Sally enter into an alternate universe, Tommy is the star of Saturday Night Live, but later gets fired by Harry (who in the alternate reality, is employed as the President of NBC) for being too conceited and demanding a large salary.

== Running gags ==
The major running gag of Tommy is that he is the "least" sexy of the alien colleagues, for Dick has charm, Sally has looks and Harry has an exotic sexual behavior. For example, in one episode, at the bar where Harry works later in the series, there was a machine that tests how sexy you are. Whenever Tommy tries it out, he gets the lowest score ("cold fish"), while Harry constantly gets the highest.

During the first three seasons, Tommy is often referred to resembling a girl in part due to the shoulder-length hair he had during the first half of the series; the phrase "cut your hair, you look like a girl" would sometimes be said to him after he offended a person with a particular remark, mainly by characters specifically appearing in that episode. The first such instance occurs in the episode "Ab-dick-ted", after Tommy sarcastically remarks on a "coin-behind-the-ear" magic trick Mary's brother Roy Albright (Bronson Pinchot) performs on him when Dick introduces the family to Roy.

The episode "Will Work for Dick" plays off this gag as Sally (who spends her time during the episode recapturing the childhood she never had), has Tommy's hair styled (in two different instances) in braided pigtails and a beehive. Dick's dream at the beginning of the season three episode "Fun With Dick and Janet" in which he dreams that a banged-up Tommy, Harry and Sally arrive at his wedding to Mary Albright to confront Dick about his decision to stay on Earth while the rest of the unit left for the home planet, also plays off the gag with Tommy showing Dick that he developed breasts after the three accidentally came too close to a quasar. This gag concluded in season three's "Just Your Average Dick", when Tommy gets a haircut, as part of the Solomon family's attempts to become "normal" after his then-girlfriend August Leffler said that she thought the family acted strange.

== Romantic life ==
Tommy has had two main girlfriends over the course of the show: August Leffler and Alissa Strudwick. He has a lot of difficulty maintaining a relationship with any girl, as he is often forced to come up with plausible explanations for his family's bizarre behavior. Therefore, much of his relationships seem to involve him begging his girlfriend to not leave him.

Tommy has had other love interests, although typically ones that only last a single episode. Among the most notable were his glee club teacher, a goth student and even, on one occasion, Dr. Mary Albright and her sexually experienced niece.
