= Harry Solomon =

- French Stewart as Harry Solomon
- First appearance: "Brains and Eggs"
- Last appearance: "The Thing That Wouldn't Die: Part 2"
- Created by: Bonnie and Terry Turner
- Portrayed by: French Stewart

In-universe information
- Species: Extraterrestrial; Cyborg
- Gender: Male (in human form)
- Title: Harry (later promoted to Harold)
- Occupation: Transmitter; Various short-lived jobs

Harry S. Solomon is a character in 3rd Rock from the Sun, played by French Stewart. He is the brother of Dick Solomon and Sally Solomon, and the uncle of Tommy Solomon. His middle initial is mentioned in the episode "Dick the Vote." French Stewart said in a 1998 interview, "The way the character was originally described to me was he would be an idiot on any planet. So he's got to be the biggest idiot in the universe!"

== Mission ==
In the early episodes, Harry, unlike the rest of the "family," didn't seem to have any definable role in the expedition. During the opening credits of the first season, James Earl Jones, acting as narrator, states that "well-- they had an extra seat" in reference to him.

After the discovery that he has a "transmitter" implanted in his brain (which, apparently, takes up half the space in his head) for the purposes of communication with the home planet, he takes the title of "Communications Officer," which the others agree to so he doesn't feel left out. Foreshadowing this discovery, Harry explains that his "mother was a cold receptacle and [his] father was just a machine," indicating that, unlike the rest of the family, he is a cyborg.

According to an interview with French Stewart on the 3rd Rock from the Sun First Season DVD, Harry was related to/knew an important alien back on the homeworld, and that his position was a sinecure.

Communication was usually initiated without warning, either from the Big Giant Head himself, or his office. Upon contact, Harry is "taken over" entirely. The first signs are always physical - he immediately shudders violently, garbles incoherently, then adopts a stance with bent knees and upraised arms, palms forward. The message itself is always preceded with "Incoming message from the Big Giant Head!" or "Transmission incoming from the Big Giant Head!", followed by the message, spoken in a voice unlike his usual one.

When the message is completed, the exit statement is always "Resume normal functions in three ... two ... one ...", or later "transmission ending in three ... two ... one ...", after which he shudders, performs a dance-like movement, belches, or sneezes. Returning to normal he usually inquires "So what did I miss?...", indicating that he doesn't know what he had said.

In the season 4 premiere, Harry opens a transmission line to the Big Giant Head in order to send an overdue status report.

== Love life ==
In contrast to what would be expected of someone as weird and apparently unsophisticated as Harry, he seems a very adept lover and often has interludes with those that might be considered "out of his league," though this did not stop him from maintaining a haphazard relationship with Mrs. Dubcek's daughter Vicki. The two often have conversations as if they were in a porno, similar to how Sally and Don often have conversations like an old crime drama. Their relationship was often interrupted; examples include Vicky's commitment to physical and spiritual purity to the point that she becomes celibate, and her pregnancy with the Big Giant Head's child.

At one point (in part one of the series finale "The Thing That Wouldn't Die"), Harry arranges a date with a clerk, Sam, then sees her again as hostess at a restaurant and makes a date with her again, as "Samantha", which she feels more appropriate for the atmosphere. Harry, not realizing that this is the same person using her legal name, thinks he has made dates with twins.

Other affairs have included a well-toned policewoman named Janice (played by Chyna), a woman at the laundromat, a single mother (owner of the lost dog Scruffy) and Dick's office assistant Nina Campbell. In the series finale, Harry revealed that he had a long-lasting secret relationship with Mrs. Dubcek.

== Life as a human ==
Harry in general serves as the slapstick comic foil for the show, even having an entire section of the clip show episode "7 Deadly Clips" dedicated to clips of him hurting himself or being hit. The typical "funny points" involve a great deal of running into things or being hit. In addition to the physical comedy that Harry brings to the show, his naivety and slow-wittedness are other sources of amusement, especially when his apparent stupidity gives way to absurdity, such as when Harry declares it is his mission to "bring electricity to the people of Earth." Tommy informs him that humans have electricity, so Harry concludes that "my work here is done."

In contrast to the frequent exhibition of a total lack of intelligence, Harry at one point speaks fluent French to Dick, and has a natural talent for the arts. He is always with his eyes half-opened. Despite his aptitude with the physical aspects of the opposite sex, Harry seems incapable of fully functioning in a common social situation. Often he will run off on a mission to right some irrelevant wrong and not realize the "offender" is conceding and will then proceed to take physical and occasionally violent action. Harry held several positions in the "working world." Among them, he served as a representative for Orca Cosmetics for Men, worked in a movie rental store, and as a bartender. For all his haphazard antics, however, Harry (ironically) seems to be the only member of the team fully comfortable with life on earth.

=== Alternate universe ===
In the season six two-part episode "Dick'll Take Manhattan", in which Dick, Harry and Sally enter into an alternate universe, Harry is employed as the President of NBC, while Mrs. Dubcek is his secretary.

== Behind the scenes ==
Harry's distinctive squint was invented by French Stewart as he auditioned for the role. The look soon became Harry's signature. "It's sort of the equivalent of your mother telling you not to make faces because they might stick that way forever. Well, I've now got a face that's stuck," said Stewart in an interview. "But it's worth it. People respond to Harry, and the squint is probably a big part of his appeal. So, I'm just riding it for all it's worth."

Harry Solomon also became the focus of 3rd Rock from the Sun's physical comedy. "If someone is going to fall, walk funny or get hit, then it's going to be Harry," writes journalist T.D. Mobley-Martinez. In a 1997 interview, Stewart remarked, "What I try to do is to make these things seem like Warner Brothers cartoons -- make the impossible seem possible. But sometimes you pay for it the next day. I do bits sometimes, and I wake up with bruises and huge rug burns all over my legs."

According to Stewart, one of his most difficult stunts was contorting his body to play as the communicator for the Big Giant Head. "I wasn't sure that I had nailed that until I realized how much pain I was in doing it. Now I'm just afraid that 20 years from now, I'm going to be going to sci-fi conventions and they're going to ask me to do the Big Giant Head bit and I'll wind up a cripple," he said.
