= Dick Solomon =

- Promotional shoot of John Lithgow as Dr. Dick Solomon
- First appearance: "Brains and Eggs"
- Last appearance: "The Thing That Wouldn't Die: Part 2"
- Created by: Bonnie and Terry Turner
- Portrayed by: John Lithgow; Kristen Johnston (body switched with Sally in "Two-Faced Dick")

In-universe information
- Species: Extraterrestrial
- Gender: Male (in human form)
- Title: "The High Commander"
- Occupation: High Commander (alien rank); Physics professor (human occupation); Lawyer (alternative universe in "Dick'll Take Manhattan")
- Family: The Big Giant Head (father)
- Significant others: Mary Albright; Janet Solomon (ex-wife); Renata Albright (ex-wife)

Dr. Dick Solomon is a character played by John Lithgow in the late-1990s NBC sitcom 3rd Rock from the Sun. Solomon is the High Commander of a highly trained alien unit, sent to Earth by their leader, The Big Giant Head. His crew is made up of Sally Solomon (played by Kristen Johnston), Harry Solomon (played by French Stewart), and Tommy Solomon (played by Joseph Gordon-Levitt). In the first episode, "Brains and Eggs", Dick states that he has made a home of a "third rate planet, has a job at a third rate university, and now we are looking at a third floor apartment."

== Work ==
Dick works at Pendelton State University as a professor of physics, and shares an office with Anthropology professor Mary Albright (played by Jane Curtin). In the first episode the office is green with various pictures and certificates adorning the wall; after this, however, the office is antique white with tribal masks featured, presumably from Albright's anthropological studies (later it is found that she simply "bought them at airports"). Dick often uses his class, oddly enough the same throughout all six seasons, to gain a better understanding of humanity by assigning arbitrary essays on which their grade depends. (John's real life son, Ian Lithgow plays the shy, and often ridiculed, Leon, one of Dick's students.) Dick never has the idea that they're actually learning something, but when he finally gets through to them "his father" came in, dismissing the class because he needed to talk to Dick.

== Love life ==
Throughout the course of the series, Dick maintains a tense love-hate relationship with Mary Albright. At times they are together, while at others Mary quite clearly disfavors Dick. At the end of the second season, Dick and Mary are to be married as the other Solomons (Sally, Harry, and Tommy) return to the home planet.

At one point, Dick discovers what he calls the "freedom" of casual sex. He has sex with the recently divorced mother of a student, Bug (David DeLuise) when she is in on holiday, not knowing who she is. Dick realizes the identity of his partner when, as he frequently does, he relates his sexual experience to his class. At the end of the episode, Bug's father (portrayed by David DeLuise's father Dom DeLuise) walks into Dick's office wearing a fedora flanked by two brutes (portrayed by DeLuise' real-life sons Michael and Peter) who seem to have a connection to the mob.

In season four's episode five, "What's Love Got to Do, Got to Do with Dick," Dick is forced to share his office with Dr. Jennifer Ravelli (played by Laurie Metcalf), a professor of Comparative Literature from Harvard for whom Dick coins the caustic appellation "Professor McBitch." Dick enjoys the free-hearted literary genius of his new office partner and develops a crush; however, due to his lack of familiarity with relationships, he assumes he is in love and seeks permission from Mary Albright to "see other people" and it is granted. The quirks that attracted Dick soon become a nuisance, bringing a quick end to their relationship, but not before Dick attempts to use Mary's new jealousy to gain "quantity time as well as quality time."

== Alternate universe ==
After Dick, Harry and Sally enter a parallel universe in the two-part episode "Dick'll Take Manhattan" from the sixth season, Dick discovers that in the parallel universe, he is a highly successful lawyer; unfortunately, he does not have a girlfriend. When looking for Mary, Dick enters a bar, where he finds Mary, performing on stage under the name of "Kiki".
