= Mary Albright =

- Jane Curtin as Dr. Mary Albright
- First appearance: "Brains and Eggs"
- Last appearance: "The Thing That Wouldn't Die: Part 2"
- Created by: Bonnie and Terry Turner
- Portrayed by: Jane Curtin; Jodi Johnson (as a child in "Dick-In-Law")

In-universe information
- Alias: Kiki Lyle
- Species: Human
- Gender: Female
- Title: Doctor of Philosophy
- Occupation: Anthropology professor
- Family: George Albright (father - not biologically); Martha Albright (mother); Roy Albright (brother); Renata Albright (sister)
- Significant other: Dick Solomon
- Relatives: Tiffany (niece)

Mary Margaret Albright is a fictional character who was played by former SNL cast member Jane Curtin in the American situation comedy 3rd Rock from the Sun. She serves as a straight foil and love interest for the eccentric Dick Solomon.

== Casting ==
Curtin was recruited to play Mary by friend Bonnie Turner after another actress was deemed too sweet for the part. Co-star John Lithgow said, "We really needed a very strong human comic presence. . . . Someone who could give it out and dish it out." Curtin had earlier worked with Bonnie and Terry Turner on Saturday Night Live and in the 1993 film Coneheads. She originally signed for just seven episodes, but soon agreed to extend her commitment. "I loved the character, but I also loved the sense of humor on the show," she later explained. "I had known John in New York, and I'm very comfortable with him. It made me laugh when John and I were working together -- there just would be puddles on the floor."

Reflecting on the show in 2005, Lithgow remarked "Jane was just perfect for it. She's a great comedy partner. She understands the role of a straight man; however, she also has a terrific streak of wildness herself so she creates this wonderful repressed character who occasionally spins out just as much as the aliens do."

== Occupation ==
Mary works as a professor of Anthropology at the fictional Pendelton State University in Rutherford, Ohio. For approximately six months during the sitcom's 4th season, Mary served as dean of Pendleton's School of Arts and Sciences. However, she lost this job and returned to her role as professor after she was caught breaking into friend and colleague Judith's office after Dick convinced her that Judith was after her job.

== Relationship with Dick ==
Mary and the 'father' of the alien group, who works at Pendelton as a physics professor, were forced to share an office. While Dick was attracted to her almost instantly, Mary took a long time to warm to Dick. After their initial success, Dick and Mary enjoyed an on-off relationship; Dick would often annoy Mary, causing her to grow angry and seemingly break up with him. However, in the next episode, they are nearly always back together (notable exception: when Dick was engaged to Mary, then discovered another alien had been sent to masquerade as his wife, leading Mary to believe he is committing polygamy. Even then, she forgave him.)

When Dick and his 'family' are called back to the home planet, Mary discovers Dick's alien identity; she is initially persuaded to return with them. However, she realises how much she would miss Earth, so Dick wipes her memory of him and his family. In an alternate ending, Dick returns and abducts her.

== History ==
From hints in the show, Mary formerly drank a lot and often used her femininity to get what she wanted from men. From references and one episode about her parents, it appears that her father had affairs and her mother drank a lot. Mary comes from a dysfunctional, trashy family, but she and sister Renata have become successful – Renata is rich, while Mary is a professor and doctor. In one episode, Dick marries Renata, in order to divorce her and get her to promise she will not build a library at Pendelton that will cast a shadow in Mary's office. Renata was played by guest star Megan Mullally (best known for playing Karen Walker on Will & Grace). Mary also has a younger brother, Roy Albright (Bronson Pinchot), who claims to have been abducted by aliens. This completely freaks out the family; to this end Sally and Harry take Roy out a cornfield to "killroy" as the plan is called. In the end, he is found out to be lying.

Mary's siblings, Roy and Renata, only appear in a single episode each and are never seen or referred to outside of these episodes. Even in family anecdotes, Mary does not mention her siblings. When Mary was a child, she was overweight and unhappy. She and her parents used to vacation at a bed and breakfast every summer when she was a child, and her parents wreaked havoc with their partying and drinking.

As seen in "The Dicks They Are A'Changin'", Mary was a part of the 1960s counterculture in her youth (flashbacks showed her dressed in hippie garb), though she mentions she "never made it to Woodstock". Mary attended UC Berkeley in the late '60s and was apparently involved in the Free Speech Movement there.

At one point during her youth, she worked at a Dairy Queen.

== Alternate universe ==
In the episode "Dick'll Take Manhattan" from the sixth season, in which Dick, Harry and Sally enter into an alternate reality, an alternate universe in which Mary has a completely different personality and life. She is a shallow, airheaded and 'slutty' lounge singer at a dive bar in Manhattan. She uses her feminine wiles to get money and gifts from men. She attempts to do so with Dick Solomon but finds herself falling in love.

== Pets ==
Mary used to own fish, before Dick was left to look after them as Mary was on a conference – he introduced an angelfish, which ate all the others. Mary was angry with Dick for killing her fish, calling him a "jackass". Dick subsequently bought her a dog to compensate. After breaking off their engagement, Mary tries to get rid of the dog, but realizes she loves him. She and Dick later get back together, making Mary relieved she didn't get rid of her dog. On several occasions throughout the show, Mary's dog would come running onto the set and start humping her.

== Trivia ==
- In the episode "Dick's Ark", it is revealed she is known at her local supermarket as "The White Zinfandel Lady."
- Mary's passport and credit card both say "Mary Albright, Ph.D."
- Jane Curtin, the actress who portrays Mary, also played an alien (Prymaat Conehead from Saturday Night Live). Her full name is also similar as Prymaat's alias in the 1993 Coneheads film: Mary Margaret DeCicco.
