= David Sacks (writer) =

American television writer and producer

David Sacks is an American television writer and producer.

== Biography ==
He attended Harvard College, graduating with a degree in government in 1984. While there he began his comedy writing career as an editor of the school's humor magazine, The Harvard Lampoon. Upon graduating, Sacks moved to Los Angeles and began writing for television. For a while, he and fellow Lampoon editor Rob LaZebnik were writing partners. Their first television job was on Not Necessarily the News. Later they wrote together for the sitcoms Women in Prison and Empty Nest. Sacks was among the future The Simpsons writers who wrote for George Meyer's Army Man comedy zine in the late 1980s. His writing and producing credits include seasons five and six on The Simpsons, for which he won an Emmy Award; 3rd Rock from the Sun, for which he received a Golden Globe Award; Malcolm in the Middle, The Tick, Pound Puppies, Regular Show, Murphy Brown, and created and executive produced Lewis Black's The Root of All Evil for Comedy Central. In 2013, Sacks produced a weekly podcast Spiritual Tools for An Outrageous World available on iTunes and Stitcher.com.

He executive produced and cowrote Nickelodeon's Pig Goat Banana Cricket with series co-creator Johnny Ryan, and as of 2016 was executive producing and showrunning TBS' original series Final Space.
