= Christine Zander =

American television writer and producer

Christine Zander is an American television writer and producer. She started writing for national television on NBC's Saturday Night Live (1987–1993).

== Personal life ==
Zander is the daughter of Marie Zander, who died in May 2001. She has one brother Ernie Zander. She married actor and writer Mark Nutter in 1987, and together they had son Andrew Nutter. Nutter and Zander first met at the cabaret Cross-Currents in Chicago where they were both performing improvisational comedy, and Nutter also played keyboard for the Second City touring company. The couple relocated from Chicago to New York City when Zander was offered a position at Saturday Night Live in 1986. After seven years of working for Saturday Night Live, Mark Nutter and Zander relocated with their baby to Los Angeles for Nutter to find more opportunities as a writer. They have since divorced.

== Career ==
=== Saturday Night Live ===
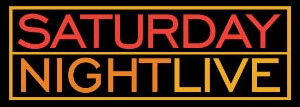

Christine Zander joined midway through the 1986-87 season of Saturday Night Live along with other famous comedy writers such as Kevin Nealon and Phil Hartman (as well as Bonnie and Terry Turner, who joined a couple months later). The first sketch Zander was able to get on the air starred Bill Murray as the one night stand of cast member Jan Hooks. During her time there, she worked closely with Nora Dunn on various sketches. When Dunn left the show, she became very close with Julia Sweeney, helping her craft sketches for the famous character "Pat," an androgynous and cripplingly awkward boss. Zander and Sweeney later collaborated on a fictional biography for the character, It's Pat! My Life Exposed, which was published by Hyperion in September 1992. Her favorite sketches to write on the show were "Pat", "Attitudes" starring John Malcovich, and "Their Eyes Evolved to Be on Their Breasts", which involved women who developed eyes on their breasts so as to better meet the male gaze.

When Christine Z. joined the staff of Saturday Night Live, she and Rosie Shuster were the only two females on the writing staff. In 1992 Zander told the New York Times,

If you don't have a lot of women to bounce ideas off or back you up it can get a little crazy around here. None of the men are individually sexist; it's just hard for them to have faith in something from a woman's point of view.

Zander left the show in 1993, after 6½ years with the show.

=== 3rd Rock from the Sun ===
Zander was thrilled to join her writer friends from SNL Bonnie and Terry Turner who created the NBC sitcom 3rd Rock from the Sun in 1996. The sitcom followed a group of extraterrestrials sent to Earth to investigate human society, and it starred famous actors John Lithgow and Joseph Gordon-Levitt. The show was fairly popular; its ratings ranked 22nd in the 1995 television season and 27th in the 1996 season. Zander eventually became executive producer of the series in 1999 until the show's end in 2001.

== Filmography ==
=== As writer ===
Year	Title	Notes
1987–1993	Saturday Night Live	Television series Nominated-- Outstanding Writing in a Variety or Music Program (1987, 1990–1991, 1993) Won-- Outstanding Writing in a Variety or Music Program (1989)
1994	Nurses	Television series Episode: "Don't Hit the Road, Jack"
1994	She TV	Television series Episode: "Episode #1.2"
1995	Bringing Up Jack	Television series
2000	Shadow Life	Short film directed by Julia Sweeney
1996–2001	3rd Rock from the Sun	Television series Also producer
2002	That '80s Show	Television series Also producer Episode: "My Dead Friend"
2003–2006	Less than Perfect	Television series Also producer
2006	Untitled Patricia Heaton Project	Television pilot Also producer
2007	The Singles Table	Television series Episode: "The Work Dinner"
2007	Samantha Who?	Television series Also producer Episode: "The Wedding"
2009	Ab Fab	Television movie Also producer
2009–2010	Nurse Jackie	Television series Also producer Episodes: "Apple Bong" and "School Nurse"
2011	Running Wilde	Television series Also producer Episode: "Alienated"
2011	Raising Hope	Television series Also producer Episodes: "Prodigy" and "Everybody Flirts... Sometimes"
2013	The Goodwin Games	Television series Also producer Episode: "Happy Hour"
2013	Mom	Television series Also producer
2014	Jennifer Falls	Television series Also producer Episode: "School Trouble"
2015	Kevin from Work	Television series Also producer Episodes: "Escape from Work" and "Birthday from Work"
2016–2018	*Loosely Exactly Nicole	Television series Also producer
2019–2021	The Unicorn	Television series Episodes: "The Unicorn and The Catfish" and "A Big Move"

=== As producer ===
Year	Title	Notes
1996–2001	3rd Rock from the Sun	Television series Executive producer 2000–2001 Nominated-- Outstanding Comedy Series (1997–1998)
2001–2002	Grounded for Life	Television series Consulting producer
2002	That '80s Show	Television series Executive producer
2002–2006	Less than Perfect	Television series Co-executive producer
2006	Untitled Patricia Heaton Project	Television movie Executive producer
2007–2008	Samantha Who?	Television series Consulting producer
2009	Ab Fab	Television movie Executive producer
2009–2010	Nurse Jackie	Television series Co-executive producer 2009 Executive producer 2010 Nominated-- Outstanding Comedy Series (2010)
2010	Running Wilde	Television series Co-executive producer
2011–2012	Raising Hope	Television series Co-executive producer
2013	The Goodwin Games	Television series Co-executive producer
2013	Mom	Television series Consulting producer
2014	Jennifer Falls	Television series Consulting producer
2015	Kevin from Work	Television series Co-executive producer
2016	*Loosely Exactly Nicole	Television series Executive producer
