= Ileen Getz =

American actress (1961–2005)

- Born: August 7, 1961; Bristol, Pennsylvania, U.S.
- Died: August 4, 2005 (aged 43); New York City, U.S.
- Occupation: Actress
- Years active: 1995–2005
- Spouse: Mark Grinnell
- Children: 2

Ileen Getz (August 7, 1961 – August 4, 2005) was an American actress, most recognized for her role as Dr. Judith Draper in the television series 3rd Rock from the Sun.

== Professional life ==
Getz began working professionally at The Practical Theatre Company while still in college. After graduating from Northwestern University, she became a company member of the Econo-Art Theatre Company, and worked in other Chicago, Illinois, theaters.

She began her television work in 1995, with appearances on shows such as Law & Order and Seinfeld. In 1996, Getz became a recurring cast member on 3rd Rock from the Sun, playing a professor of women's studies with no personality. Her film career included minor roles in such films as Celebrity, Lovely and Amazing, The Station Agent, Changing Lanes, and the posthumously-released Friends with Money and Falling for Grace.

In 1992, Getz made her Broadway debut in Jake’s Women as an understudy. She also appeared off-Broadway in Howard Korder’s The Lights at Lincoln Center Theatre in 1993, Richard Greenberg’s Night and Her Stars at The American Place Theatre in 1995, and Greenberg’s Hurrah at Last at Gramercy Theatre in 1999, the latter of which she has previously done at South Coast Repertory and was produced by Roundabout Theatre Company. Both Greenberg plays were directed by David Warren.

== Filmography ==
Film
Year	Film	Role	Notes
1998	Celebrity	Reunion Announcer	
2001	Lovely & Amazing	Saleswoman	
2001	The Next Big Thing	Trish Kane	
2002	Changing Lanes	Ellen	
2003	The Station Agent	Mrs. Kahn	
2004	A Hole in One	Nurse Aphrodite	
2006	Friends with Money	Marla	Posthumous release
2006	Falling for Grace	Salesperson	Posthumous release

Television
Year	Show	Role	Episode	Notes
1995	Caroline in the City	Mrs. Banks	"Caroline and the A.T.M."	
1995	Cybill	Make-Up Person	"They Shoot Turkeys, Don't They?"	
1995	Law & Order	Irene Krasner	"An Act of God"	
1995	Seinfeld	Organizer	"The Sponge"	
1996	NYPD Blue	Margaret Normal	"Yes Sir, That's My Baby"	
1996	The Prosecutors	Female District Attorney #2		TV movie
1996-2001	3rd Rock from the Sun	Dr. Judith Draper	Recurring	
1997	Chicago Hope	Mrs. Bridges	"Verdicts"	
1999	Hey Arnold!	Woman in Carriage	"The Headless Cabby"	Voice role
2000	The $treet	Patty Blagman	"High Yield Bonds"	
2001	That '70s Show	Michelle	"Canadian Road Trip"	
2002	Law & Order: Special Victims Unit	Mrs. Preston	"Dolls"	
2003	Untitled New York Pilot	Marilyn Weiss		TV movie
2004	The Jury	Dr. Osgood	"Three Boys and a Gun"	
2004	Law & Order	Syndelle Greenblatt	"All in the Family"	

== Death ==
Getz died of complications from ovarian cancer at the age of 43 on August 4, 2005, in New York City.
