= Simbi Khali =

American actress and singer

- Khali in 2025
- Born: Simbi Khaliebum Waters; April 28, 1971 (age 55); Jackson, Mississippi, U.S.
- Other names: Simbi Kali; Simbi Kali Williams
- Education: Duke Ellington School of the Arts; California Institute of the Arts
- Occupations: Actress, voice actress, singer, songwriter, rapper
- Years active: 1990–present
- Spouse: Cress Williams (m. 2000; div. 2011)
- Children: 2

Simbi Khali (born April 28, 1971), sometimes credited as Simbi Kali Williams, is an American actress and singer best known for her role as Nina Campbell on the NBC sitcom 3rd Rock from the Sun. Her credits include the television show Martin and the feature films Vampire in Brooklyn, A Thin Line Between Love and Hate, and Plump Fiction. On stage, Khali has appeared in Colored Museum, For Colored Girls..., A Midsummer Night's Dream, and Troilus and Cressida. She also had a career in voice acting, most notably Varesh Ossa in the video game Guild Wars Nightfall, and Amanda in the video game Detroit: Become Human.

== Early life ==
Khali was born in Jackson, Mississippi, the youngest of five girls and two boys. When she was two, Khali's family moved to Chicago's South Side. Khali started singing at a young age.

She became interested in theatre at Chicago's ETA Creative Arts Foundation. At age 15, she went to live in Alabama with her sister, Hamidah Elmore, and experienced her first "onstage rush" in a high school talent show.

For her junior and senior years of high school, she moved to Washington, DC, to live with her mother Amerah Shabazz. She transferred to the Duke Ellington School of the Arts, where she committed to acting. Khali won admission to the California Institute of the Arts and graduated in 1993 with a degree in acting.

== Career ==
At a performance during her senior year at Cal Arts, she was spotted and signed by a talent agent. That summer, she performed as part of a Ben & Jerry's troupe that visited hospitals and other charities, passing out samples of ice cream. It paid well and gave her time to audition, leading to her first job in the FOX sitcom Martin.

From 1993 to 1997, she played Sheneneh's vocal best friend in Martin. From 1996 to 2001, she played Nina Campbell in the NBC sitcom 3rd Rock from the Sun. She was initially cast a recurring character, but was bumped to a main character in season 3.

In 2016, Khali's career, performances, character portrayals and other accolades were officially recognized and commended by the Mississippi legislature.

== Personal life ==
Khali initially met actor Cress Williams at a Los Angeles club in 1994, then again in the fall of 1999 while filming the BET movie Masquerade. Within a month they were engaged, and they married in Malibu in the fall of 2000.

== Filmography ==
=== Television ===
Television roles
Year	Title	Role	Notes
1993–1995	Martin	Laquita	4 episodes
1994	The Sinbad Show	Carmen	Episode: "Girls Unda Hoodz"
1994	She TV	Various	1 episode
1996–2001	3rd Rock from the Sun	Nina Campbell	Recurring (season 1–2), main cast (season 3–6)
2000	Men in Black: The Series	Voice	Episode: "The J is For James Syndrome"
2000	Masquerade	Joi Scott	TV movie
2002	That '80s Show	Venus	Episode: "After the Kiss"
2002	Clifford the Big Red Dog	Voices of Monique and Mrs. Young	3 episodes
2003	Stuart Little	Voice	Episode: "No Job Is Too Little"
2004	The Bernie Mac Show	Therapist	Episode: "Five Stages of Bryana"
2009	Special Agent Oso	Voice	Episode: "Live and Jump Rope / A View to a Kitten"
2012	Weeds	Mary	Episode: "Unfreeze"
2017	Better Things	Museum Director	Episode: "Phil"

=== Film ===
Film roles
Year	Film	Role	Notes
1995	Vampire in Brooklyn	Nikki	
1996	A Thin Line Between Love and Hate	Adrienne	
1997	Plump Fiction	Sister Sledge	
2002	We Were Soldiers	Alma Givens	
2009	Mississippi Damned	Anna	
2017	Girl Minus	Auntie	Short film
2019	Gothic Harvest	Voice	
2020	Buck	Mom	Short film
2020	-Ship: A Visual Poem	Aunt Julia	Short film
2021	A Savannah Haunting	Josephine	
2023	Ricky	Winsome	Short film
2025	Ricky	Winsome	
2025	Bone	Carol	Short film

=== Video games ===
Video game roles
Year	Title	Role
2006	Guild Wars Nightfall	Varesh Ossa / Additional Voices
2008	The Incredible Hulk	Ceres Leader
2018	Detroit: Become Human	Amanda
