= Chris Hogan (actor) =

American stand-up comedian

- Born: Christopher Hogan; U.S.
- Occupations: Actor, comedian
- Years active: 1995–present
- Spouse: Elizabeth Porter
- Children: 1

Christopher Hogan is an American actor and comedian, most notable for his membership in the recurring cast of comedians on MADtv and for the character of Aubrey Pitman, one of Dick Solomon's students, on 3rd Rock from the Sun.

== Early life ==
Hogan grew up in Eastchester, New York, and went to Trinity College, in Hartford, Connecticut, graduating in the class of 1985. While at Trinity, he was a member of the Alpha Delta Phi fraternity.

== Career ==
=== MADtv ===
Hogan joined the cast of MADtv in 1997, as a repertory performer, for the third season. He is remembered for playing characters who could only wrestle the infamous response, "He looka like a man" from Alex Borstein's Ms. Swan, whether it would be a fast food clerk, a police officer, or his Fox Mulder character. Hogan's other characters included Miguel O'Reilly (New at Six), Vonda Parker (Parker Sisters), and public accountant Milton Cladwell. However, Hogan is most remembered for succeeding David Herman as the colorful El Asso Wipo from the Superstars of the Mexican Wrestling Federation Theatre. El Asso struck fear into the hearts of many with his famed one line threat, "I will break their back like so, WITH MY KNEE!" After one season on the show, Hogan left MADtv at the conclusion of season three.

=== Characters ===
- El Asso Wipo (Mexican Wrestling Federation)
- Miguel O'Reilly (News at Six)
- Milton Cladwell
- Vonda Parker (Parker Sisters)

==== Catch phrases ====
- "You ain't gettin' none a' this, none a' this and especially none of THIS" - Vonda Parker (The Parker Sisters)
- "I will break your back, like so, with my knee!!" - El Asso Wipo

=== Television projects ===
Since MADtv, Hogan has made a number of television appearances on shows such as 3rd Rock from the Sun, Martin Short's Primetime Glick, Just Shoot Me!, Grounded for Life as Mr. Kersey, and on The Sopranos as Meadow's advisor at Columbia University.

== Television ==
Year	Title	Role	Other notes
2005	Scrubs	Mr. Gerst	Episode 89
2004	Arrested Development	Man in Bar	
2003	Yes, Dear	Rob	
2002 - 2005	Grounded for Life	Mr. David Kersey	
1999	That '70s Show	Therapist #2	Season 1, Episode 15
1998	The Nanny	Dirk	Season 5, Episode 17
1998	From The Earth To The Moon	Don Eyles	HBO docudrama TV miniseries Episode 9
1997 - 1998	MADtv	Various Characters	Sketch Comedy
1997	Just Shoot Me	Wally	Episodes 1.1-1.6
1996 - 2001	3rd Rock from the Sun	Aubrey Pitman	
