= Sally Solomon =

- Kristen Johnston as Sally Solomon
- First appearance: "Brains and Eggs"
- Last appearance: "The Thing That Wouldn't Die: Part 2"
- Created by: Bonnie and Terry Turner
- Portrayed by: Kristen Johnston (John Lithgow in "Two-Faced Dick")

In-universe information
- Species: Extraterrestrial
- Gender: Female (in human form)
- Title: Lieutenant
- Occupation: Security officer Homemaker; Various short-lived jobs
- Significant other: Don Orville

Sally Solomon (played by Kristen Johnston) is a fictional character from the television sitcom 3rd Rock from the Sun.

== Role as female ==
Prior to arriving on Earth, the Solomons had some sort of contest or a bet to determine who would be male or female (their species makes no such differentiation). Sally, a highly trained, decorated, combined combat specialist/military tactician, became the woman, something she found to her disliking, at least at first.

== Alternate universe ==
In the two-part episode "Dick'll Take Manhattan" from season six, in which The Solomons (Except Tommy) enter into an alternate reality, an alternate universe Sally writes a sex column for the newspaper (an homage to the Carrie Bradshaw character from the HBO comedy series Sex and the City). She finds out that she is still dating Don, who is now the Mayor of New York City. However, it turns out that he's actually just having an affair with her.

== Romantic life ==
Of her forays into the romantic, her most successful was with Officer Don Orville, the first real example of martial authority she encountered on Earth. Their relationship lasted for half the series, ending when Sally discovered that Don's real passions lay in baking, as opposed to law enforcement, and she whipped him up into a force to be reckoned with, thus taking away the spark they once had. However moments after the two salute one another they begin passionately kissing each other.
