= Ian Lithgow =

American actor (born 1972)

- Born: Ian David Lithgow; February 3, 1972 (age 54); New York City, U.S.
- Education: Harvard University (BA); Antioch University Los Angeles (MA)
- Occupations: Actor, therapist
- Years active: 1993–present
- Known for: 3rd Rock from the Sun
- Spouse: Rachel Lithgow (m. 2001; sep. 2018)
- Children: 2
- Father: John Lithgow
- Relatives: Arthur Lithgow (grandfather)

Ian David Lithgow (born February 3, 1972) is an American actor and therapist. He is best known for his work as Leon in the NBC series 3rd Rock from the Sun (1996–2001). He is the son of actor John Lithgow.

== Early life and education ==
Lithgow was born on February 3, 1972, in New York City, the son of actor John Lithgow.

He received his undergraduate degree from Harvard University in 1994, majoring in English. He spent two years doing his M.A. in clinical psychology, specializing in marriage and family therapy at Antioch University Los Angeles, graduating in 2005. As of 2023 he runs a practice in Lower Manhattan.

== Career ==
Lithgow has acted in film, television, and in regional theatres across the US, including the Goodman Theatre, the American Repertory Theatre, the Williamstown Theatre Festival, the Ahmanson Theatre, and the Pasadena Playhouse. He originated the role of Tony in Boy Gets Girl, which he performed at the Manhattan Theatre Club.

In the 1990s NBC sitcom 3rd Rock from the Sun, Lithgow portrayed the recurring role of Leon, a purportedly dim-witted student who attends the physics class of Dick Solomon (portrayed by Ian's real-life father John Lithgow). Ian portrayed a son of John's character in the 2020 HBO television series Perry Mason.

== Personal life ==
Lithgow was married to Rachel Jagoda from 2001 to 2018. They have two children.

== Filmography ==
=== Film ===
Year	Title	Role	Notes
1993	A Pound of Flesh		
1999	Far from Bismarck	Wallace	
1999	Puppet, Love and Mertz	Puppet	Short
2003	Rice Girl	Detective Tom Monk	
2005	Fellini's Donut	Guido Anselmi	Short
2020	Tesla	Alfred Brown	
2025	Sisterhood Inc.	Randall Cole	

=== Television ===
Year	Title	Role	Notes
1996-2001	3rd Rock from the Sun	Leon	48 episodes
2017	Bull	Griffin Fuller	Episode: "Name Game"
2020	The Blacklist	Kleeman	Episode: "Newton Purcell (No. 144)"
2020	Perry Mason	Byron Jonathan	Episode: "Chapter Five"
2025	Godfather of Harlem	Fred Straub	2 episodes (Season 4 episodes 3 and 8)
