= Bonnie and Terry Turner =

Husband-and-wife writing team

- Born: Bonnie Turner: August 28, 1940 (age 86); Toledo, Ohio, U.S. Terry Turner; December 11, 1947 (age 78); U.S.
- Occupations: Television writer; television producer; screenwriter
- Notable work: 3rd Rock from the Sun; That '70s Show

Bonnie and Terry Turner (born August 28, 1940, and December 11, 1947) are an American husband-and-wife team of screenwriters and producers. They are best known for creating the sitcoms 3rd Rock from the Sun and That '70s Show, and its Netflix sequel That '90s Show.

Bonnie Turner is currently on the board of jurors for the Peabody Awards.

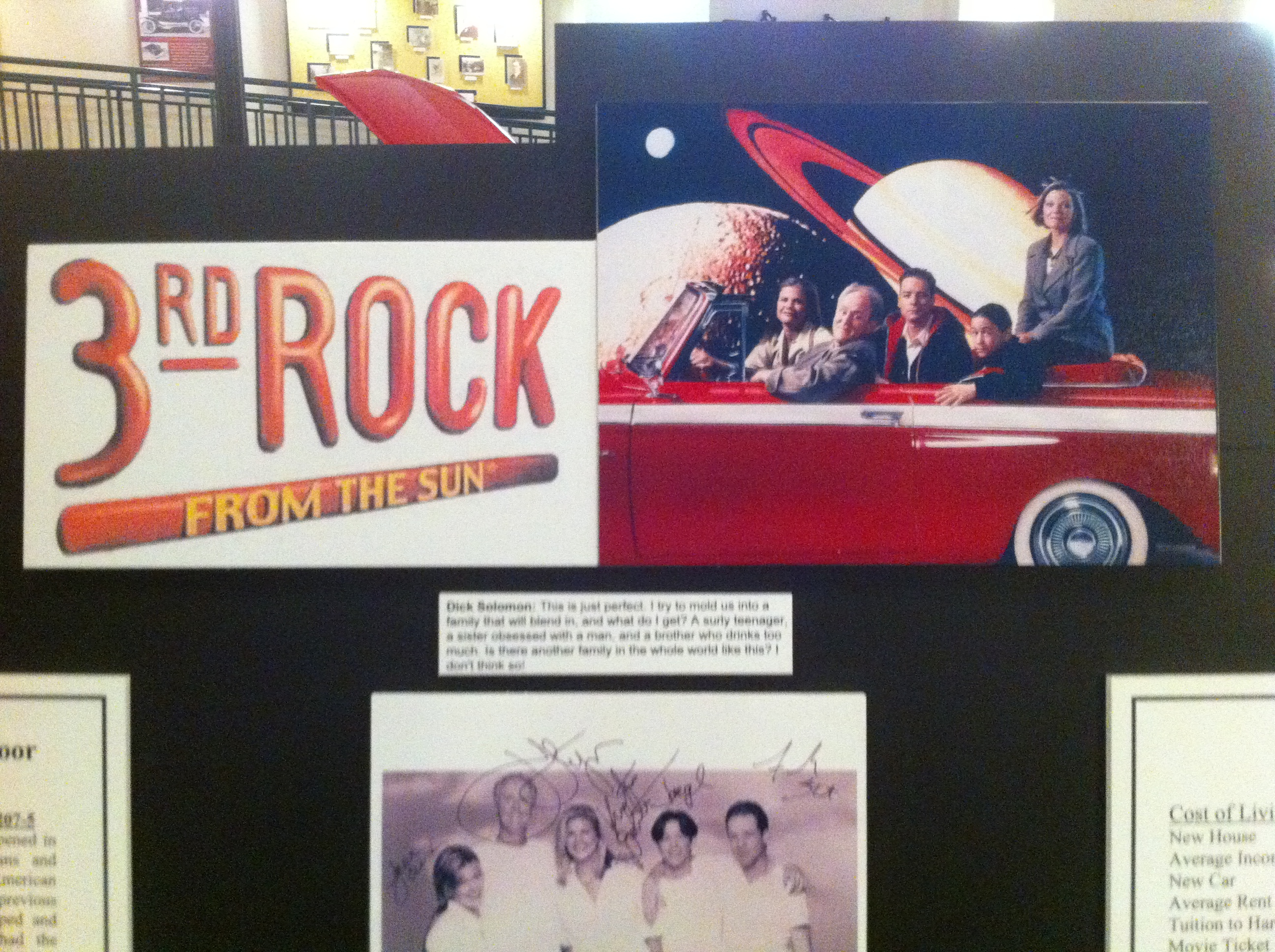
Display panel about the 1962 Rambler American 400 convertible that was used in the TV series "3rd Rock from the Sun". The car was donated by the show's creators and producers: Bonnie and Terry Turner.

== Career ==
Bonnie and Terry Turner were part of a 1980s Atlanta comedy troupe whose members often appeared on the WTBS comedy TV show Tush. They also worked as feature writers for (no relation) Ted Turner's new (at that time) CNN spinoff CNN Headline News. In the mid-1980s, they produced the WTBS Sunday morning magazine show Good News with host Liz Wickersham.

Another comedy troupe member and good friend, Jan Hooks, after appearing in Pee-wee's Big Adventure, landed a spot on Saturday Night Live. Jan told them the show was looking for writers and encouraged them to submit some sketches, and they were hired three months later. While at SNL they wrote sketches including Church Chat, Singing Cowboys, Dysfunctional Family Christmas and Musicians for Free-Range Chickens.

Between 1987 and 1995, they were responsible for writing or screenwriting six films, including Coneheads, Wayne's World, Wayne's World 2, Tommy Boy, and The Brady Bunch Movie. While writing the screenplays they lived primarily in New York and moved to Los Angeles in 1994 to develop 3rd Rock from the Sun.

They also created the NBC sitcom Whoopi with Whoopi Goldberg in 2003.
