= List of True Jackson, VP episodes =

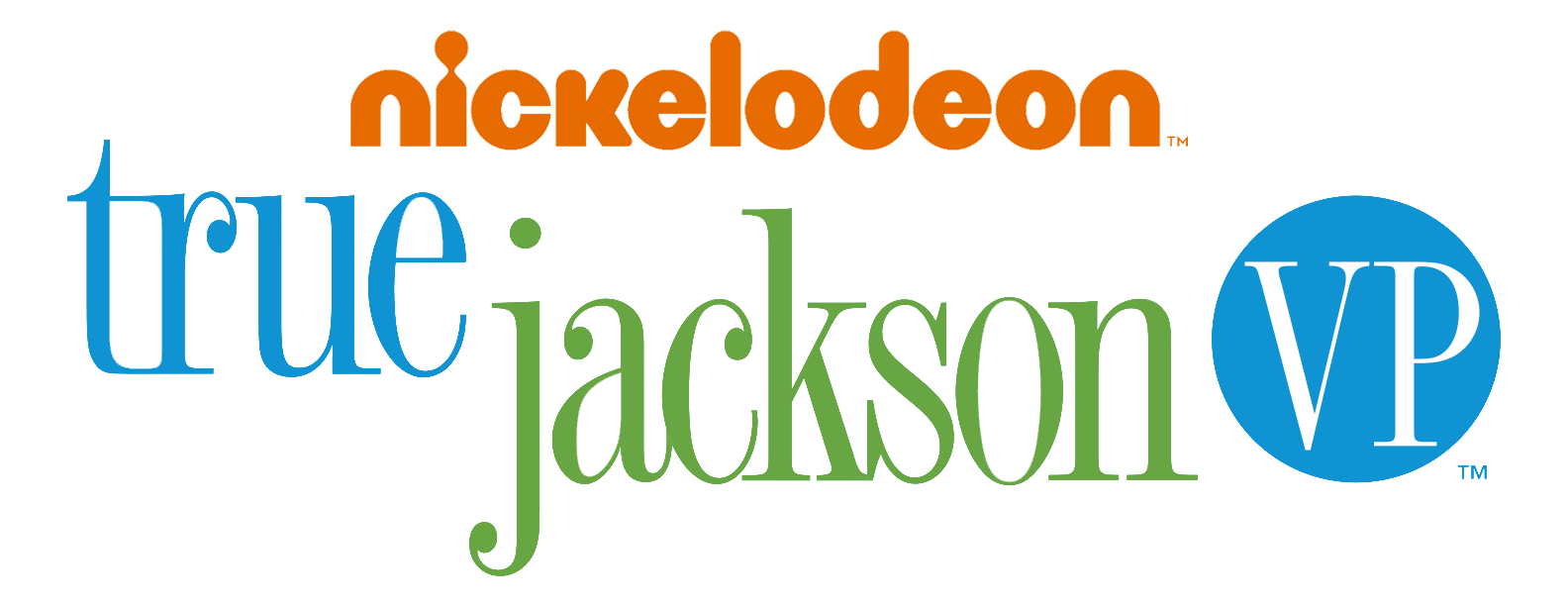

The following is a list of episodes of the Nickelodeon sitcom True Jackson, VP. The series revolves around True Jackson (Keke Palmer), a fashion-savvy teenage girl who becomes the vice president of the youth apparel division of Mad Style, a fashion company based in New York City.

The series premiered on November 8, 2008 and ended on August 20, 2011, with 56 episodes and 3 seasons.

== Series overview ==
| Season | Episodes | Originally released | |
| Season | Episodes | First released | Last released |
|---|---|---|---|
| 1 | 25 | November 8, 2008 | October 24, 2009 |
| 2 | 18 | November 14, 2009 | August 7, 2010 |
| 3 | 13 | September 11, 2010 | August 20, 2011 |

== Episodes ==
=== Season 1 (2008–09) ===
| No. overall | No. in season | Title | Directed by | Written by | Original release date | Prod. code | U.S. viewers (millions) |
|---|---|---|---|---|---|---|---|
| 1 | 1 | "Pilot" | Gary Halvorson | Andy Gordon | November 8, 2008 | 100 | 4.8 |
Impressed by her sense of style, Max Madigan (Greg Proops) impulsively hires 15-year-old True Jackson (Keke Palmer) as the Vice President of the youth apparel division of his fashion company, Mad Style. True invites her friends Lulu (Ashley Argota) and Ryan (Matt Shively) to help her out on her first day. She enjoys the job at first but later considers quitting after realizing most of her new colleagues underestimate her due to her juvenescence. However, after a pep talk with Max's dreamy nephew Jimmy (Robbie Amell), she decides to stay.: Special guest star: Suzy Nakamura as Cricket
| 2 | 2 | "Firing Lulu" | Roger Christiansen | Dan Kopelman | November 15, 2008 | 102 | N/A |
True hires Lulu as her assistant. However, Lulu's negligence causes True to mess up on a project. She fires Lulu but later feels guilty for doing so. After receiving unexpected advice from her bitter older colleague Amanda (Danielle Bisutti), True apologizes to Lulu and re-hires her.: Absent: Robbie Amell as Jimmy Madigan
| 3 | 3 | "Babysitting Dakota" | Roger Christiansen | Story by : Steve Baldikoski & Bryan Behar; Teleplay by : Dan Martin | November 22, 2008 | 103 | N/A |
Famous supermodel Dakota North comes to Mad Style to model for them. Initially excited to spend the day with her, True soon realizes that Dakota is difficult to work with. Dakota later opens up to True and laments how her fame prevents her from living a normal life. Empathizing with her, True encourages her to go to a friend's party, but this later proves problematic when it turns out the party takes place at the same time as the conference Dakota was expected to attend. In order to save her job, True pretends to be Dakota, but is saved when the real Dakota shows up. Meanwhile, Ryan tries to get a girl by convincing Lulu to pretend to be his girlfriend.: Guest star: Nathalia Ramos as Dakota North; Absent: Robbie Amell as Jimmy Madigan
| 4 | 4 | "Ryan on Wheels" | Gary Halvorson | Bill Kunstler | December 6, 2008 | 108 | N/A |
True is assigned the task of designing some new gear for young skateboard star Ryan Sheckler. In order to gain access to Ryan's all-male skate club, she and Lulu must go undercover as boys. Elsewhere, Amanda decides to adopt a friendlier attitude at work so that her latest assistant will stay in the role longer than one day.: Guest stars: Ryan Sheckler as himself and David Anthony Higgins as Dave; Absent: Greg Proops as Max Madigan, Robbie Amell as Jimmy Madigan
| 5 | 5 | "Telling Amanda" | Gary Halvorson | Andy Gordon | December 13, 2008 | 104 | N/A |
Ryan and True discover that Amanda's boyfriend is cheating on her and debate whether or not they should tell her. Meanwhile, Lulu is convinced that Max's accountant is really Santa Claus.: Guest star: Stephen Dunham as Chad Brackett; Absent: Robbie Amell as Jimmy Madigan
| 6 | 6 | "The Prototype" | Joe Menendez | Steve Joe & Greg Schaffer | January 3, 2009 | 107 | 4.5 |
True lends Lulu a dress from the dress vault to wear to her cousin's party. When she discovers it is a one-of-a-kind prototype, she and Amanda must return the dress before Max finds out.
| 7 | 7 | "ReTRUEnion" | Gary Halvorson | Sarah Jane Cunningham & Suzie V. Freeman | January 17, 2009 | 106 | 3.56 |
As Amanda prepares for her high school reunion, True, Lulu, and Ryan find her old yearbook and discover that she used to be a dork and the target of bullying.: Guest star: Sean Gunn as Justin; Absent: Greg Proops as Max Madigan and Robbie Amell as Jimmy Madigan
| 8 | 8 | "True Takes Iceland" | Gary Halvorson | Andy Gordon | January 25, 2009 | 101 | N/A |
When the head of Iceland's largest retail chain visits Mad Style, Amanda and True, along with their assistants, compete to see whose design will be featured. Meanwhile, Ryan tries to impress a model by saying he's the vice president of Mad Style.: Guest star: Julie Bowen as Claire Underwood
| 9 | 9 | "True Matchmaker" | Gary Halvorson | Jason Kessler | February 7, 2009 | 105 | 3.95 |
After Max learns his ex-fiancée is marrying someone else, True tries to mend his broken heart by fixing him up with Doris (Melanie Paxson), her quirky, eccentric school librarian. Meanwhile, Amanda and Mad Style's receptionist Oscar (Ron Butler) bond over their secret love of a ridiculous sci-fi.: Absent: Robbie Amell as Jimmy Madigan
| 10 | 10 | "The Rival" | Gary Halvorson | Dan Kopelman | February 16, 2009 | 110 | 3.1 |
Max's nemesis and business rival, Simon Christini, tries to lure True to leave Mad Style and work for his company. The two devise an elaborate human chess game between the two companies to determine who will win True over.: Guest star: Andy Richter as Simon Christini; Absent: Robbie Amell as Jimmy Madigan
| 11 | 11 | "Company Retreat" | Brent Carpenter | Andy Gordon | February 28, 2009 | 112 | 2.85 |
Max sets up a company retreat so that everyone in the office will learn to trust each other. Everyone ends up learning a secret from one another, including Max's plan to sell the company, True's crush, and a revenge-seeking assistant.: Guest stars: Dave Foley as Ted Begley, Jr. and Yvette Nicole Brown as Coral Barns
| 12 | 12 | "Keeping Tabs" | Bob Koherr | Sib Ventress | March 7, 2009 | 111 | 4.4 |
True accidentally overspends with her company credit card at a costly restaurant. When it is revealed she held the elevator for the company accountant, she drops all charges but deducts part of her pay until the expenses are paid off.: Guest star: Julie Warner as Rose Pinchbinder; Absent: Greg Proops as Max Madigan and Robbie Amell as Jimmy Madigan
| 13 | 13 | "Red Carpet" | Katy Garretson | Dan Signer | March 21, 2009 | 109 | 2.7 |
True designs a dress for a big-name TV actress named Jenna Lutrell. However, after True makes multiple alterations to the dress at Jenna's request, it gets slammed by a ruthless fashion critic on the red carpet, dashing True's hopes for a good career. Meanwhile, Max hires Ryan to design a new website for the company. Also, Amanda teaches Lulu about the stock market, and she makes investments in companies with silly names that actually prove profitable.: Guest stars: Arden Myrin as Jenna Lutrell and Rachael Harris as Kitty Monreaux
| 14 | 14 | "Switcheroo" | Eric Dean Seaton | Sib Ventress | April 11, 2009 | 118 | 3.65 |
In an attempt to expand his employees' skills and knowledge beyond their respective departments, Max temporarily assigns everyone a different job.: Guest star: Dave "Gruber" Allen as Mitchell
| 15 | 15 | "True Intrigue" | Jean Sagal | Jason Kessler | April 22, 2009 | 114 | N/A |
While in Africa, Max discovers an eco-friendly fabric that could change the fashion world. True and Ryan must keep it a secret until Max is ready to share it with the world. However, Ryan discovers that a college student hoping for an internship is a spy for Christini. When no one believes him, he must find a way to expose her himself. Meanwhile, Lulu gets a conflicting message from her crush.: Absent: Robbie Amell as Jimmy Madigan
| 16 | 16 | "Amanda Hires a Pink" | Katy Garretson | Andy Gordon | May 16, 2009 | 115 | 3.8 |
Lulu accidentally tells The Pinks, the head mean girl clique at True's school, about True's job, so they show up at Mad Style to terrorize her. Hoping to intimidate her to the point of quitting, Amanda hires their leader, Pinky (Jennette McCurdy), as her new assistant. True then loses focus and makes an error at work, which she tries to rectify in a creative way. Meanwhile, Lulu and Ryan accidentally lock themselves in the dress vault.: Absent: Greg Proops as Max Madigan and Robbie Amell as Jimmy Madigan
| 17 | 17 | "Max Mannequin" | Gary Halvorson | Tom Gammill & Max Pross | June 13, 2009 | 117 | N/A |
Max asks for True's help in coming up with a creative way to propose to Doris.: Guest stars: Kevin Farley as Officer Jake Hooley and Kent Shocknek as himself; Absent: Robbie Amell as Jimmy Madigan
| 18 | 18 | "True's New Assistant" | Gary Halvorson | Russ Woody | June 27, 2009 | 121 | N/A |
True's science teacher, Mr. Jameson (Vincent Ventresca), fills in as her assistant for a week while Lulu fills in for an accountant who Ryan accidentally injured.: Absent: Robbie Amell as Jimmy Madigan
| 19 | 19 | "House Party" | Roger Christiansen | Linda Videtti Figueiredo | July 11, 2009 | 120 | 2.8 |
Lulu's boyfriend, Mikey J, throws a party and allows Lulu to bring her friends. True's work life and social life begin to conflict when she realizes she may be too busy preparing for a presentation to attend. She manages to finish her presentation and show up at the party, where she reunites with Shelley (Taylor Parks), an old friend from grammar school who thinks that work has become more important to True than her friends.: Absent: Robbie Amell as Jimmy Madigan
| 20 | 20 | "Back to School" "Testing True" | Gary Halvorson | Andy Gordon | July 25, 2009 | 124–125 | 3.0 |
When the first week of school begins, True has difficulty balancing her school life and work responsibilities. Meanwhile, Max's old flame, Sophie Girard, comes to town to win him back after learning he is engaged.: Guest stars: Gail O'Grady as Sophie Girard, Willow Smith as Young True and Kelly Perine as Larry Jackson, True's dad; Absent: Robbie Amell as Jimmy Madigan
| 21 | 21 | "Fashion Week" | Gary Halvorson | Andy Gordon & Dan Kopelman | September 19, 2009 (Note: This episode was first released in Season 1 Volume 1 DVD on September 8, 2009.) | 116 | 2.8 |
True is determined to present her dream dress in the Young Designers Showcase during fashion week. However, Jobi Castanueva, the Fashion Week committee chairman, rejects True's design out of vengeance for being fired as Amanda's assistant the previous week. Meanwhile, Ryan brings his pet hamster, Chewy, to Mad Style, which causes chaos.: Guest star: Ian Gomez as Jobi Castanueva
| 22 | 22 | "True Crush" | Gary Halvorson | Sarah Jane Cunningham & Suzie V. Freeman | September 26, 2009 | 113 | 3.6 |
True is invited to the Last Minute Ball. When they discover she only has one extra ticket, Lulu and Ryan begin to fight over it, but True actually wants to go with Jimmy. Meanwhile, a model named Vivian (Victoria Justice) shows up to Mad Style and, despite being very intelligent, pretends to be dumb to annoy Amanda. After True discovers that Jimmy has already asked Vivian to go to the ball, she is comforted by her friends, and they end up eating frozen yogurt together instead of going to the ball. Meanwhile, a trick Ryan plays on Amanda's new assistant leads to her quitting, and he must complete all her work for the rest of the day.: Absent: Greg Proops as Max Madigan
| 23 | 23 | "The Hotshot" | Gary Halvorson | Dan Kopelman | October 3, 2009 | 122 | 2.8 |
Max hires another teen fashion designer for Mad Style named Jasper. Initially suspicious of Jasper, True's hunches are confirmed when he steals her idea and presents it to Max as his own. Max is so impressed by the design's illustration that he hires Jasper as the new vice president; however, once he sees it as an actual outfit and not an illustration, he instantly recognizes the design as True's because of the lining. Ultimately, Jasper gets fired for plagiarism. Meanwhile, Lulu helps Ryan prepare for his history test.: Guest star: James Patrick Stuart as Burt Burlington; Absent: Robbie Amell as Jimmy Madigan
| 24 | 24 | "The Wedding" | Bob Koherr | Andy Gordon | October 17, 2009 | 119 | N/A |
True and Amanda compete to design Doris' wedding dress. When the wedding planner quits, True has to step up to the plate to prevent the wedding from becoming a disaster. Meanwhile, Ryan has to make a new wedding cake after accidentally knocking over the original one.: Guest star: Jack Plotnick as Matthieu LaRue; Absent: Robbie Amell as Jimmy Madigan
| 25 | 25 | "The Dance" | Brent Carpenter | Sarah Jane Cunningham & Suzie V. Freeman | October 24, 2009 | 123 | N/A |
Mikey J doesn't ask Lulu to the Back-to-School Dance. She later finds True dancing with him, leading her to believe that they are going out behind her back. However, True reveals she was teaching Mikey J how to dance. Meanwhile, Ryan and Jimmy find the ghost of an old receptionist. Also, Amanda develops a crush on a model and cancels all the other models who auditioned for the new catalog.: Absent: Greg Proops as Max Madigan

=== Season 2 (2009–10) ===
| No. overall | No. in season | Title | Directed by | Written by | Original release date | Prod. code | U.S. viewers (millions) |
|---|---|---|---|---|---|---|---|
| 26 | 1 | "True Concert" | Gary Halvorson | Dan Kopelman | November 14, 2009 | 204 | 3.8 |
True needs to raise $6,000 to save her school's design department, so she decides to throw a benefit concert. She manages to recruit Justin Bieber as a guest singer, but she has to come up with a backup plan when Bieber gets injured right before the event. Meanwhile, Lulu feels she and Mikey J are growing apart.: Special guest stars: Justin Bieber as himself and Care Bears on Fire as themselves; Absent: Danielle Bisutti as Amanda Cantwell, Greg Proops as Max Madigan, and Ron Butler as Oscar
| 27 | 2 | "The New Kid/Little Shakespeare" "Flirting with Fame" | Gary Halvorson | Sebastian Jones (Part 1); Sib Ventress (Part 2) | November 21, 2009 | 201–202 | 3.0 |
A new kid named Justin comes to school and confesses that he has a crush on True. Unbeknownst to True, he is a famous rapper in disguise. By the end of the episode, True breaks off her relationship with Justin after realizing that he prioritizes his career over her. Meanwhile, Jimmy becomes a pilot, and Ryan becomes the vice president of a big-time airline company. Also, Lulu becomes jealous when she notices Mikey J getting closer to Kelsey, Ryan's crush.: Absent: Greg Proops as Max Madigan (part 2); Guest stars: Tyler James Williams as Justin Webber, Janel Parrish as Kyla, Philip Baker Hall as Mr. Jenkins, Galaxy Airlines chairman (part 1) and Natasha Bedingfield as herself (part 2); Note: "Nickelodeon promoted this episode under the title "Flirting with Fame", but the actual production notes list the episode under two separate titles, "The New Kid" and "Little Shakespeare".
| 28 | 3 | "True Parade" | Gary Halvorson | Andy Gordon | December 12, 2009 | 210 | N/A |
Max challenges the designers to come up with an idea to promote Mad Style. True's idea is to design a jacket for a game show host, Burt Burlington, to wear in the Macy's Thanksgiving Day Parade, but her plan jeopardizes her job when she discovers that Max hates him due to being abashed on a guest appearance at Burt's game show 5 years ago. Meanwhile, a fortune teller predicts that either Lulu or Ryan will break their arm, while the other will win a thousand dollars.: Guest star: Nicole Sullivan as Kreuftlva and James Patrick Stuart as Burt Burlington
| 29 | 4 | "True Drama" | Roger Christiansen | Steve Joe | January 9, 2010 | 211 | 3.3 |
Ryan joins the drama club in order to win Kelsey over and winds up becoming the director of the school play. Ryan casts Lulu as the lead and True as the costumer designer, much to the girls' delight. However, things quickly go awry when Kelsey begins to act like a diva. Ryan ultimately gives Lulu's role to Kelsey instead, leading True to make a deal with the incorrigible Pinky Turzo (Jennette McCurdy) to plot revenge.: Absent: Greg Proops as Max Madigan and Ron Butler as Oscar
| 30 | 5 | "My Boss Ate My Homework" | Roger Christiansen | Diana Sproveri | January 16, 2010 | 203 | N/A |
Max must attend detention at True's school after accidentally eating a flash drive containing her homework which he mistook for a little snack. While he is gone, he puts True in charge of the office, but when the paranoid and overzealous fire marshal comes and shuts down Mad Style, she must take action. Meanwhile, Ryan tries out for cheerleading to avenge the expulsion of Kelsey from the squad.: Guest stars: Richard Karn as Fire Marshal O'Bannon and Tristin Mays as Hailey
| 31 | 6 | "Little Buddies" | Adam Weissman | Sib Ventress | January 30, 2010 | 208 | N/A |
True, Lulu, and Ryan must mentor incoming freshmen for a day as part of their school's "Little Buddies" program. True decides to take her assigned little buddy, a shy girl named Molly, to work with her. Molly ends up breaking out of her shell when she is asked for her opinion on True's new dress and criticizes it. True later learns to accept criticism and makes a better dress using new fabric. Meanwhile, Lulu's little buddy Babs, who is ironically 35 years old, teaches her about life. Also, Ryan's little buddy, Nate, is a juvenile delinquent who keeps getting him into trouble.: Guest stars: Laura Marano as Molly, Bobb'e J. Thompson as Nate and Pamela Adlon as Babs; Absent: Greg Proops as Max Madigan
| 32 | 7 | "True Valentine" | Gary Halvorson | Sebastian Jones | February 6, 2010 | 206 | N/A |
True and Jimmy go to the Valentine's dance as friends, even though they both want to admit they have feelings for each other. Meanwhile, Amanda keeps receiving flowers from model Brock Champion, which everyone thinks she is sending to herself. At the end of the episode, the flowers are revealed to be from Brock when he arrives at Mad Style and asks Amanda to marry him. Also, Ryan finds out Kelsey likes him, and Mikey J. writes a song for Lulu.: Absent: Greg Proops as Max Madigan
| 33 | 8 | "True Date" | Dennie Gordon | Steve Joe | February 20, 2010 | 212 | N/A |
In the aftermath of Valentine's Day, True and Jimmy prepare for their first date, just as Max implements new rules banning Mad Style employees from dating each other. Meanwhile, Amanda begins planning her wedding with Brock, with unhelpful advice from Doris.: Absent: Ron Butler as Oscar; Guest star: Kevin Farley as Officer Jake Hooley
| 34 | 9 | "The Hunky Librarian" | Roger Christiansen | Sarah Jane Cunningham & Suzie V. Freeman | March 13, 2010 | 209 | N/A |
Max gets jealous upon learning that Doris' new assistant librarian is an attractive young man. In turn, Doris is jealous of Bijou, the beautiful, French-speaking receptionist filling in for Oscar. True unwittingly becomes the mediator for their conflicts. Meanwhile, Ryan opens a rash museum after noticing his rash resembles Taylor Swift.: Guest star: Travis Schuldt as Lance Whipple; Absent: Ron Butler as Oscar
| 35 | 10 | "Saving Snackleberry" | Roger Christiansen | Stacey Cantwell | March 20, 2010 | 213 | N/A |
True and Lulu mistakenly arrange for Max to host a dinner party at Ryan's favorite restaurant, a hobo-themed fast food chain called Snackleberry Junction. Meanwhile, Jimmy takes over as receptionist while Oscar is on vacation and refuses to let Hibbert perform his job.: Guest stars: Wendie Malick as Libby Gibbils, Stephen Tobolowsky as Lars Balthazar, Tom Kenny as Bingo and Craig Anton as Snackleberry Junction chef; Absent: Ron Butler as Oscar
| 36 | 11 | "Pajama Party" | Gary Halvorson | Steve Joe | April 3, 2010 | 207 | N/A |
Due to an invitation mix-up in the mail, Amanda shows up at True's slumber party, and they become competitive while playing a board game. Meanwhile, Lulu becomes jealous when Shelly (Taylor Parks) tells her she had a dream about Mikey J. Also, Ryan and Jimmy attend a preview screening of a John Cena movie and wind up meeting the action star.: Guest stars: Willow Smith as Young True, Vivica A. Fox as Mrs. Jackson, Italia Ricci as herself and John Cena as himself; Absent: Greg Proops as Mr. Madigan and Ron Butler as Oscar
| 37 | 12 | "The Gift" | Roger Christiansen | Andy Gordon | April 17, 2010 | 205 | N/A |
True and Lulu arrange a surprise office visit from Mr. Madigan's Uncle Cheswick as a birthday gift, unaware that Uncle Cheswick is a horse. Meanwhile, Ryan's older, more successful brother, Stu (Ian Reed Kesler), visits and announces he is quitting business school to become an artist.: Guest stars:: Henry Hereford as Ryan's Great Grandfather and Ian Reed Kesler as Stu Lazerbeam
| 38 | 13 | "True Royal" | Roger Christiansen | Sarah Jane Cunningham & Suzie V. Freeman | May 1, 2010 | 214 | 3.7 |
True designs a tuxedo for a young prince, then gives him a tour of New York City. Meanwhile, Amanda pretends to be Lulu's mother in order to win a "Mothers in Fashion" award, the only fashion award she doesn't have. Also, Jimmy gets a new and improved mail cart after Ryan breaks his old one.: Guest stars: Nathan Kress as Prince Gabriel, Oliver Muirhead as Ian, Gabriel's butler, Tom Kenny as Bingo, J. P. Manoux as Snackleberry Junction waiter and Kent Shocknek as himself; Absent: Greg Proops as Max Madigan
| 39 | 14 | "True Fear" | Gary Halvorson | Sib Ventress | May 8, 2010 | 216 | N/A |
Max accompanies True to her career day, where he eats too much shrimp and subsequently gets sick. While he recovers, he asks True to give a speech at a fashion convention in his place, but True must overcome her fear of public speaking. Meanwhile, Ryan and Lulu suspect that Amanda's new male model is a vampire.: Guest star: Paul F. Tompkins as Royce Bingham
| 40 | 15 | "The Reject Room" | Gary Halvorson | Dan Kopelman | May 15, 2010 | 215 | N/A |
True discovers that some of her design ideas have been rejected, taking her frustrations out on Max. Meanwhile, Amanda's ex-boyfriend Chad Brackett (Stephen Dunham) returns and invites the Mad Style staff to his art exhibit that depicts Amanda in an unflattering manner.
| 41 | 16 | "Mission Gone Bad" "Trapped in Paris" | Gary Halvorson | Andy Gordon | May 22, 2010 | 218–219 | 3.4 |
True accidentally places Doris' wedding ring in a vest pocket and sends the vest to Paris. She and Lulu disguise themselves as flight attendants to steal it back but end up getting trapped in an old mansion. Meanwhile, Amanda hires Ryan as a model for her boy fashion line.: Guest stars: Gage Golightly as Vanessa, Jessica Makinson as rude airline passenger, Michele Boyd as Nicole, a French model, Stefán Karl Stefánsson as Karl Gustav, Samantha Boscarino as Carla Gustav, Lawrence Palmer (Keke Palmer's younger brother) as Ricky Racecar and the cast of Yo Gabba Gabba!
| 42 | 17 | "Heatwave" | Gregg Heschong | Steve Joe | June 26, 2010 | 217 | N/A |
Max gives True the responsibility of coming up with a brand new design for a winter coat by the end of the work day. She uses Ryan as a model for the coat, but he cannot withstand the heat, so they move into the company's "arctic room." There, Ryan accidentally destroys the air conditioner, melting Max's private ice cream stash. True and her friends must replace the ice cream before Max finds out. Meanwhile, the heat damages Amanda's hair just as she is about to model for a magazine.
| 43 | 18 | "True Magic" "True Kiss" | Alfonso Ribeiro | Andy Gordon | August 7, 2010 | 220 | N/A |
A new girl named Sienna comes to Mad Style to replace Hank, Jimmy's retiring mail room partner. Jimmy and Sienna instantly bond over their shared love of mail, making True jealous. True shows up at the postal ball that Jimmy and Sienna are attending, where True and Jimmy assert their mutual feelings for one another and share a kiss, cementing their status as a couple. Meanwhile, Ryan tries to get accepted into the Junior Magicians Club but loses to a talented girl named Bernie. He enlists the help of Max, who was once a magician himself, to perfect his routine.: Guest stars: Hayley Erin as Sienna, Cymphonique Miller as Bernie and French Stewart as Donald the Delightful

=== Season 3 (2010–11) ===
| No. overall | No. in season | Title | Directed by | Written by | Original release date | Prod. code | U.S. viewers (millions) |
|---|---|---|---|---|---|---|---|
| 44 | 1 | "True Luck" | Leonard R. Garner, Jr. | Steve Joe | September 11, 2010 | 221 | N/A |
True's Uncle Troy (Jordan Black), notorious for his history of bad luck, takes over as the receptionist at Mad Style, but after True touches him, She now believes that she has inherited his bad luck in exchange of Uncle Troy receiving True's lucky streak. This all comes at a bad time due to True working on a fragrance for the company. Meanwhile, Lulu begins to have romantic dreams about Ryan, which causes her to be uncomfortable around him. She then tells Mikey J., who challenges Ryan to a boxing match.: Absent: Robbie Amell as Jimmy, Ron Butler as Oscar, and Greg Proops as Mr. Madigan
| 45 | 2 | "The Fifth of Prankuary" | Sheldon Epps | John Quaintance | September 25, 2010 | 224 | N/A |
Max dares the Mad Style employees to perform their best pranks, but True and Lulu take things too far when they think he's playing a prank on them at school by giving them a fake standardized exam.
| 46 | 3 | "Mad Rocks" | Shelley Jensen | Sarah Jane Cunningham & Suzie V. Freeman | October 2, 2010 | 222 | N/A |
"Mad Rocks", an annual rock-oriented fashion show, comes around with Lulu agreeing to plan the event, but True, assuming Lulu's previous irresponsibility, is reluctant to let her plan it herself. Her eavesdropping nearly deters the event from happening, but she tries to save the day by bringing Jimmy's now former band, Fire & Ice, back together. Meanwhile, Max is on vacation, but he is still watching over the company with a camera helmet worn by Amanda.: Guest stars: Fefe Dobson as herself, Nick Palatas as Skeet and Julia Duffy as Ms. Watson; Absent: Ron Butler as Oscar and Greg Proops as Mr. Madigan, though he is mentioned several times throughout the episode.
| 47 | 4 | "True Secret" | Roger Christiansen | Sib Ventress | October 9, 2010 | 223 | N/A |
Max arranges a carnival in Mad Style; during this time, True and Jimmy show affection for each other when no one is around. When Max catches them kissing, he demands that one must quit by the end of the day. When True and Jimmy decide they do not want to quit, Max finally decides to get rid of the no-employee dating policy. Meanwhile, Ryan has a hard time winning a teddy bear prize for Kelsey at the carnival. Also, Amanda wants no part in this day but ends up having fun anyway when she gets stuck in the bounce house after trying to get coffee and jumps up and down until it deflates.: Guest star: Dave Allen as Mitchell
| 48 | 5 | "Class Election" | Leonard R. Garner, Jr. | Andy Gordon | October 16, 2010 | 225 | N/A |
True and Shelly go up against Lulu and Mikey J. and Kyle Sandbox and Kelsey in the class president and vice president election.: Absent: Danielle Bisutti as Amanda Cantwell, Ron Butler as Oscar, and Greg Proops as Mr. Madigan
| 49 | 6 | "True Drive" | Leonard R. Garner, Jr. | Tiffany Zehnal | November 6, 2010 | 226 | N/A |
True is overwhelmed with tasks for the day, from taking her driving test to designing a dress for a girl's sweet 16 party, and picking up Jimmy's father from the airport for his surprise birthday party which she is also planning. Meanwhile, Max is unaware that a "lucky" pair of pants he has shared with friends is not lucky at all. Also, Ryan is worried about a marble-sized growth growing on his arm.: Guest star: Tim Bagley as Ed Wheeler
| 50 | 7 | "True Disaster" | Sheldon Epps | Sib Ventress | November 13, 2010 | 228 | N/A |
True and Lulu try to sneak out of the office to get B.o.B tickets; while doing that, they must be absolutely quiet so as not to disturb Amanda, who has a serious migraine. True then agrees to let her Uncle Troy's girl soccer team have a birthday party at Mad Style. Meanwhile, Ryan, Jimmy, and Max spend the day at a comic book store in New Jersey.
| 51 | 8 | "True Fame" | Leonard R. Garner, Jr. | Manny Basanese | February 5, 2011 | 227 | 3.1 |
True appears in the local paper and is asked out by the famous actor Leon Thomas (Leon Thomas III) to accompany him to a movie awards show, which makes Jimmy jealous. Meanwhile, Max and Ryan try to get a famous dog model to be the face of Mad Style's new dog bow tie line.
| 52 | 9 | "Field Trip" | Barnet Kellman | Steve Joe | February 12, 2011 | 229 | 2.4 |
True's class goes on a field trip to a Colonial living history attraction. While there, True wants Jimmy to kiss her in the famed Lovers Tower so they can be together forever. Lulu suspects that the actor playing Benjamin Franklin is also the same actor who is the star of her favorite TV show.: Absent: Ron Butler as Oscar; Guest star: Tom Wilson as Benjamin Franklin
| 53 | 10 | "Principal for a Day" | Gary Halvorson | Dan Kopelman | February 26, 2011 | 230 | N/A |
Ryan takes over as temporary principal after injuring Principal Ruckman in the science lab. Ryan's control over the school soon gets out of hand when he gives the teachers permanent detention, with Lulu being the only one to stop him. Meanwhile, True and Jimmy discover that Amanda has four other jobs in the building where Mad Style is located.: Absent: Greg Proops as Max Madigan
| 54 | 11 | "True Mall" | Gary Halvorson | Andy Gordon & Dan Kopelman | March 5, 2011 | 231 | N/A |
A new Mad Style store opens at the local mall, and True and Lulu work undercover to ensure the store functions properly. In the process, True hires Callie, a fashion-savvy but inexperienced co-worker, as the store manager, replacing the manager that Amanda originally hired due to her abuse and arrogance. She nearly gives up her position until she gets help from her friends. Meanwhile, Jimmy prevents Ryan from following True and Lulu to the mall.: Guest stars: Emma Lockhart as Callie; Raini Rodriguez as Nina; Noah Crawford as Stan; Jack DePew as Jack; Tyler Peterson as Linus; Absent: Ron Butler as Oscar and Greg Proops as Max Madigan
| 55 | 12 | "Ditch Day" | Paul Lazarus | Sebastian Jones | March 19, 2011 | 232 | N/A |
Max takes True and Lulu out of work for the day to help a little boy named Joe to fulfill his wish to conquer his lack of bravery. But while helping the little boy, they all end up in mall jail. Jimmy is upset at Ryan for calling his band Fire & Ice lame, so he embarrasses him by making him wear a dress at the mall.: Guest stars: Logan Grove as Joe and Kevin Farley as Officer Jake Hooley
| 56 | 13 | "Mystery in Peru" | Gary Halvorson | Andy Gordon | August 20, 2011 | 233–234 | 2.18 |
True and the rest of the Mad Style staff go to Peru to attend Amanda and Brock's wedding. True wants to start her own fashion line but can't because she doesn't have enough money. True and her friends discover there is a $20,000 grand prize for whoever can find the Jewel of Peru, which has been missing for a year. True finds the jewel, but she and her friends get caught by a criminal and are put in a cage on top of a volcano. Lulu frees them using a key gifted to her by Mikey J to unlock the cage. At the wedding, Amanda falls into a fountain of youth and turns into a child, resulting in Brock leaving her. Max then reveals to True that Doris is pregnant and that he is retiring to be a stay-at-home dad, thus promoting True to the position of president of Mad Style.

== See also ==
- List of True Jackson, VP characters
