= List of True Jackson, VP characters =

The cast of True Jackson, VP (from left to right), Danielle Bisutti as Amanda Cantwell, Matt Shively as Ryan Laserbeam, Ashley Argota as Lulu, Greg Proops as Max Madigan, Keke Palmer as True Jackson, Ron Butler as Oscar and Robbie Amell as Jimmy Madigan.

The following is a list of characters on the Nickelodeon sitcom True Jackson, VP. This article has character summaries. For an episode list, see List of True Jackson, VP episodes.

== Main characters ==
=== True Jackson ===
True Jackson (Keke Palmer) is a 15-year-old girl who was hired by Max Madigan as a Vice President (VP) for Mad Style's Youth Apparel. True is constantly getting into sticky situations that nearly end in her getting fired. Amanda, another VP, is constantly trying to get True fired. True loves to help people, especially Max, even if it may cost her job. She has a huge crush on the company mailman, Jimmy; he also has feelings for her, but she does not know it until the second season. They tried dating, but Mr. Madigan made a rule against co-workers dating, so they decided to stay friends until Jimmy started spending time with the new mail room girl at Mad Style. This caused True to get jealous and reveal that she still has feelings for him. Because of this, Jimmy admitted that he also still has feelings for True and they share a kiss, thus making it evident that they are officially a couple. They remained boyfriend and girlfriend through the remainder of the series. Her catchphrase is "(You/she/he) (said/was/did) what now?", although throughout the series other characters say that as well. True is smart, funny, and hardworking. She also tells many unusual stories about her family. True is not a very good cook, but is convinced that everybody loves her cooking. She speaks fluent Icelandic in the episode "True Takes Iceland" and she can also speak fluent Swahili because her mother was born in Ghana while her father was born in New York City (as revealed in the episode "True Intrigue").

=== Lulu ===
Lulu (Ashley Argota) is one of True's best friends; they met at space camp. Lulu is incredibly smart in school, but is known not to think things through. One of her best subjects is math. She became True's assistant in the first episode after True fired the previous one, Cricket. It turns out she is a good stock investor, buying one company which was then merged to another company, resulting in a tripled stock price. She also invested in a company called "Glertokk" (a company she picked because the funny name made her smile) which went up thirty stock points a day later. She thinks that other Mad Style employees consider her to be dumb. Lulu is shown to have a fear of birds, mentioned in "Company Retreat" and shown in "The Wedding". One of her catch phrases is "Not even!" or "Boom!". She is dating Mikey J. She is part of the school band, as a triangle player. She can sometimes overreact. On one episode True was forced to fire her but then Lulu proved to True that she was a trusted assistant. According to Ashley Argota in a message from her Twitter account, Lulu does not have a last name.

=== Ryan Laserbeam ===
Ryan Leslie Laserbeam (Matt Shively) is another one of True's best friends. Ryan and True became friends when Ryan put gum in True's hair and True got revenge by telling him that every time he blinked, a bird died. He held his eyes open for 40 minutes and then passed out. Despite not actually working at Mad Style, he is often found in True's office. He gets a job to work as their website editor (a person who makes their web pages and updates it every few days). He will often try, at unnecessary times, to lighten the mood of the scene, as he loves telling jokes and pulling pranks around the Youth Fashion Department. He also mentions he has keys to most of the offices. He also was Amanda's assistant, only Amanda did not know. If he has his eyes closed for more than five seconds, he falls asleep. He has somewhat of an obsession with video games, but has also been beaten by True's dog Hercules. Ryan is known to have a strong obsession for carrots. His catch phrases are "Oh, come on!!" and "That's Ridonkulous!!". Ryan seems to be a skilled gymnast (such as in the episode "My Boss Ate My Homework" where Ryan becomes a cheerleader), but he is a klutz, and gets hurt and does some clumsy things in almost every episode.

=== Amanda Cantwell ===
Amanda Cantwell (Danielle Bisutti) is another VP for Women's Wear and True's frenemy. She is constantly trying to get True fired, and sometimes picks on her. Amanda wants to turn True's office into a gym or closet. On some occasions, however, True and Amanda may work together on things, with Amanda even giving True advice. Amanda seems to be a complete "suck up" to their boss Max, and is the only person in Mad Style who calls him Max. She is allergic to hazelnuts and goats. Usually because of her plans of getting True fired backfire, many unfortunate things happen to her, such as her dress falling off while she is modeling it, and having to feed True and her friends ice cream in a chicken suit. In the episode "True Matchmaker", it is revealed that she (as well as Oscar) is addicted to a soap opera called Space Plantation. She usually snorts like a pig when she is laughing. She was engaged to baseball player Brock Champion in the episode "True Valentine", however they did not get married in the series finale "Mystery in Peru", due to Amanda reverting to a little girl after falling in a fountain of youth.

=== Jimmy Madigan ===
Tiberius Jimmy Jeeves Madigan (Robbie Amell) is Max's nephew. He is the mailman at Mad Style, and seems to have a rather unhealthy obsession with mail, postage, stamps, and all mail-related things. True has a major crush on him. It is seen he likely returns True's feelings for him and likes her as more than just a friend, as he has helped her multiple times. Despite their feelings, they can not date each other due to company rules. Those rules were later overturned and they began dating in the latter part of season 2. Jimmy also played the drums in a band called Fire & Ice (formerly known as Diarrhea), though it was later revealed that the band split up due to a bad performance. In the episode "True Drive", it was revealed by Jimmy's astronaut father that his birth name is actually Tiberius. He was recurring in 13 episodes in season 1, and appears as a main character in season 2. Amell is only credited in the episodes he appears in.

=== Oscar ===
Oscar (Ron Butler) is the receptionist of Mad Style. He is the one who tells True when she is late for a meeting. He is very calm and gives good advice. He always seems to know what everyone is doing. He is always making lemon squares, which True and the others enjoy. He, like Amanda, is obsessed with the soap opera Space Plantation. He has a sister named Kreuflva and a brother that is the receptionist at The Pentagon. In "The Wedding", it is shown that Oscar has good hearing, being able to hear True and Lulu whispering from a little distance. He has been a vegetarian for 18 years, but will eat anything that Jimmy grills, even if it has meat in it. Like Lulu, his last name has never been revealed. He appeared in all 26 episodes in Season 1 and appears as a main character in Season 2, but starting with the second season, Butler is only credited in the opening credits of episodes he appears in.

=== Max Madigan ===
Max Madigan (Greg Proops) is the CEO of Mad Style. He hired True when he saw that she had tweaked his clothing into something she liked. From then onwards, he is like a father figure to the children, but especially True, when she feels downhearted. He seems to have a big hatred of Kopelman, possibly because he laughed at one of his earlier designs back in the 1980s on live television. He marries his girlfriend, Doris, at the end of season 1. Max was a recurring character in season 1 and is a main character as of season 2. Proops is credited in the opening credits only for the episodes he appears in. In the series finale, he retires as his wife Doris is expecting a child, and lets True take over as CEO. Max is also known as Mr. Madigan.

== Recurring characters ==
=== Kopelman ===
Kopelman (Dan Kopelman) is a worker at Mad Style who Max (and sometimes random people and coworkers) dislikes for no reason. The main reason that Max dislikes Kopelman is possibly that he laughed at one of Max's designs in 1982 or 1983. Even though he never talks, he is always accused of doing something wrong and is often told to leave the room, or go home. Kopelman has a nephew that looks just like him that only appeared in the episode "House Party". Max told him to leave the party's meeting. Kopelman loves to eat food, and he is somewhat always near food or associated with food, particularly candy. In the episode "True's New Assistant", he is supposedly attacked by Max's white tiger, which was drawn to him by the smell of meat from the sandwich that Kopelman was eating. He survived, due to him being seen in later episodes. Kopelman bought a new bow tie in the episode "Flirting with Fame", and he seems to like it very much. In all his appearances on the series, Dan Kopelman, who also serves as one of the show's writers and executive producers, is credited simply as "Kopelman". In the series finale, he becomes the only adult employee at Mad Style, due to True running the company after Max's retirement.

=== Mikey J ===
Mikey J (Trevor Brown) is Lulu's on and off boyfriend. He once had a house party at his house which True, Lulu, and Ryan were invited to. In the episode "House Party," he was worried about food more than he was with Lulu. In that same episode it is shown that his dad is strict as he did not want anyone to sit on a particular chair. He has a tendency to say "I don't really know how it works" and "that's cool" very frequently. As stated in the episode "True Concert", Mikey J is in the gifted program at school and is involved with many school activities such as student council, band, lacrosse and much others. He did not know how to dance but True taught him how to in "The Dance". He shares his first kiss with Lulu in the series finale.

=== Kelsey ===
Kelsey (Jordan Monaghan) is Ryan's on and off girlfriend and she is often asked out by him. It is hinted in the episodes "True Valentine" and "Testing True" that she might have the same feelings, and chooses to spurn Ryan's advances in order to see what he will do next. She saved Ryan's life in "True Valentine". In the same episode, Jimmy thought that she and Ryan were dating and she did not seem to mind. She also thought Ryan looked hot during a modeling job in the episode "Trapped in Paris". She is recurring in season 2, whereas she was only seen sparingly in season 1.

=== Ms. Park ===
Ms. Patti Park (Joy Osmanski) is True's strict teacher. Her first appearance was in "Testing True". In "True Drama", she says that she is the janitor, lunch lady, and is in the Drama Club. In different episodes, every time someone misbehaves, she says that they have detention. She also briefly dated Mr. Jamerson, True's science teacher in "True Valentine". She even gave Mr. Madigan detention once after he accidentally swallowed True's flash drive in "My Boss Ate My Homework". True and Lulu imply that she can "do anything".

=== Doris Madigan ===
Doris Madigan (née Aidem) (Melanie Paxson) is the school librarian that True introduces to Max. She falls in love with Max. Max proposes to her later in the first season but Doris initially declines his proposal, though states she wants him to propose to her when on a lawnchair on the side of the roof, but he declines and tries to make a mannequin that looks like him do it but it falls over so he has to do it. Max eventually chooses to propose the way Doris wanted him to, but accidentally flies in the air prematurely because the balloons attached to the lawn chair end up lifting him in the air. Max and Doris had their wedding in a zoo. Her cousin is Al Gore. She cannot see without glasses though she has been seen without them on and being able to see. She moves every six months to a different house so she does not feel cramped in one place. She does this with other things too. She can also be hyper, as seen in the episode "The Wedding".

=== Shelly ===
Shelly (Taylor Parks) is another best friend of True's. The two have known each other since they were little, but had not seen each other for a while since she started working at Mad Style. In the episode "House Party", Shelly says to True that she has changed since she worked at Mad Style and that it seems like she is too busy to hang out with her anymore. True tells her that she is still the same person that she has always been and, after Mr. Madigan tells her to cut back on work after it interferes too much with her social life, she and Shelly reconnect. Shelly is also invited to True's slumber party in "Pajama Party", where she discusses that she had a dream about her and Mikey J. dating, which makes Lulu angry. Lulu tries to wonder why Shelly has feelings about her boyfriend, but Shelly just tells Lulu that it was only a dream and she does not have those feelings for Mikey J. In the episode "Class Election", True and Shelly team up and run for Class president and Vice president for their class, against Mikey J./Lulu and Kyle Sandbox/Kelsey.

=== Hibbert ===
Hibbert (Stephen Hibbert) is another employee at Mad Style. He does not talk that much though but seems to agree with True a lot. In "Amanda Hires a Pink", Ryan thinks Hibbert is a spy. Hibbert reveals he is a lawyer in "True Fear" when he threatens to sue Jimmy for taking his burrito.

=== Mr. Jamerson ===
Mr. Jeff Jamerson (Vincent Ventresca) is True's science teacher. He was the temporary assistant in "True's New Assistant" and dated Ms. Park in "True Valentine". He also appeared in the episode "Principal for a Day".

=== Ella ===
Ella (Jo-Anne Krupa) (often referred to as Ella from accounting) was first mentioned in the pilot, but first appears in the episode "True's New Assistant" when Ryan injures her and sends her to the hospital. Ryan also eats most of her Get Well Soon Cookie and several tubs of applesauce in trying to keep her company. True's assistant for a week is her science teacher, Mr. Jamerson, while Lulu fills in for Ella in accounting, doing all of her work in no time at all and solving a complex equation that is upside down. She is usually seen tap dancing and speaks with an English accent.

== Guest characters ==
- Chad Brackett (Stephen Dunham) was Amanda's boyfriend in "Telling Amanda" and ex-boyfriend in "The Reject Room". He cheated on her with an attractive blonde and did not really love her. At the end Chad comes to True's house and says he knows Amanda is there. She throws up on him, as a result of eating too much of True's vile pudding pie, which "tastes kind of earthy, like a chocolate swamp".
- Amanda "Pinky" Turzo (Jennette McCurdy) is the leader of a clique at True's school called "The Pinks". She claims True's office "looks like a rainbow that threw up". When Amanda discovers that Pinky makes True distracted, she hires her as her assistant. Pinky also annoys Amanda by touching items in Amanda's office. "The Pinks" usually all say "hello" sarcastically after commenting on somebody. She appeared in 2 episodes, "Amanda Hires a Pink" (season 1) and "True Drama" (season 2).
- Cammy (Allie DeBerry) is friends with Pinky and part of "The Pinks" at True's school. She is just as self-centered as Pinky but with levels.
- Cricket (Suzy Nakamura) was True's first assistant when True was hired. She turned out to think True was too young and naive to handle her job, and eventually was fired by True.
- Coral Barns (Yvette Nicole Brown) was a replacement assistant for Amanda after she fired her previous assistant Abigail Barns, Coral's sister. Coral sought revenge and fed Amanda mints loaded with caffeine until she would go mad.
- Jobi Castanueva (Ian Gomez) is the overseer of Fashion Week and was formerly one of Amanda's assistants. She treated him poorly and told him he would never make it in the fashion business, and as a result he refused to allow Mad Style into Fashion Week. This led to True sneaking her outfit in to the Young Designers Showcase.
- Simon Christini (Andy Richter) is Max's rival in the fashion business. He and Max used to own Christini and Madigan Fashion Co. before they split. He tried to lure True to his company in order to hurt Max. After being advised by Amanda, True decided to stay at Mad Style. He and Max compete in extreme versions of regular games, such as playing live chess with the employees of their respective company playing the roles of the chess pieces. It is briefly implied that he plans to take over the world with a "Zombie Army".
- Dakota North (Nathalia Ramos) is a famous celebrity who appeared in the episode Babysitting Dakota. She appeared to be cruel and mean at first, but after meeting True, she turned out to be misunderstood and actually very nice.
- Dave, or "The Turk" (David Anthony Higgins) was Amanda's lazy assistant who was later fired. He is also a skateboarding champion with the nickname "The Turk".
- Rose Pinchbinder (Julie Warner) is the very mean Mad Style accountant. She gets mad at True for using her credit card on nonsense but later excuses it for True being nice to her and holding the elevator for her. She gets mad at Amanda, Oscar, and Kopelman as well for buying nonsense things. She is said to be so mean she gives Amanda nightmares.
- Justin Webber (Tyler James Williams) is a boy who joins True's school but does not reveal his identity as a famous rapper. True realizes his true identity and grows a major crush on him. At the end of the episode, Justin has to leave school to begin his European tour a month early and True breaks up with him.
- Justin Bieber appears in the first episode of season 2, "True Concert", as himself. He is hired to sing his hit single "One Time", but is injured before going on stage. True then gets Care Bears on Fire as a replacement act.
- Care Bears on Fire appears in "True Concert" as themselves.
- John Cena appears in "Pajama Party" as himself. Ryan and Jimmy attend a screening of his movie and end up attending Cena's many other events, such as being on set while watching him shoot a scene for his next movie and taking part of a Hockey game with him and fellow celebrities. It turns out to be just a dream Ryan had as he was sleeping.
- Vivian (Victoria Justice) appears in "True Crush". She shows up at Mad Style on the night of the Last Minute Ball. When she goes to the Last Minute Ball with Jimmy, True becomes upset, but in the end admits that Vivian is still really nice. In "The Dance", Jimmy reveals that he and Vivian broke up.
- Prince Gabriel (Nathan Kress) appears in "True Royal". He is a young prince for whom True designs a tuxedo, and he has a butler.
- Officer Jake Hooley (Kevin Farley) is a klutzy police officer who appeared in the episodes "Max Mannequin", "True Date" and "Ditch Day". In "True Date", he handcuffed Ryan's left wrist to Jimmy because they did not buy tickets at the subway train station. In "Ditch Day", he played a mall cop.
- Brock Champion (Andrew Larkin, uncredited) is a model who appears for a photo shoot in the episode "True Dance". In the episode, Amanda likes him, but True does not. He appears as the baseball player for Peruvian baseball league in the episode "True Valentine". Brock and Amanda became engaged in that episode, however they did not get married in the series finale "Mystery in Peru", due to Amanda reverting to a little girl after falling in a fountain of youth.
- Principal Ruckman (Michael Rockwell, uncredited) appears in various episodes. He is True's principal and dislikes Ryan pranking, as seen in the episode "Little Buddies".
