= DAG (American TV series) =

American sitcom

- Genre: Sitcom
- Created by: Jack Burditt; Eileen Conn; Andy Gordon
- Starring: David Alan Grier; Hedy Burress; Emmy Laybourne; Stephen Dunham; Mel Jackson; Lauren Tom; Paul F. Tompkins; Lea Moreno Young; Delta Burke
- Composers: Rich Ragsdale; Jonathan Wolff
- Country of origin: United States
- Original language: English
- No. of seasons: 1
- No. of episodes: 17 (1 unaired)

Production
- Executive producers: Jack Burditt; Eileen Conn; Andrew Gordon
- Producers: Steve Baldikoski; Bryan Behar; Jay Dyer; Brenda Hanes-Berg; Arthur Harris; Linda Nieber; Michael Saltzman
- Cinematography: Victor Nelli, Jr.
- Editor: Brent Carpenter
- Camera setup: Multi-camera
- Running time: 22–24 minutes
- Production companies: Gordon & Conn Productions; Double Wide Productions; NBC Studios

Original release
- Network: NBC
- Release: November 14, 2000 – May 29, 2001

DAG is an American sitcom that aired from November 14, 2000, to May 29, 2001, on NBC. It was named after its star, David Alan Grier, who stars as United States Secret Service agent Jerome Daggett. Daggett's name, in turn, is a back-formation. The show also stars Delta Burke as the First Lady of the United States.

== Synopsis ==
After making a mistake during a failed assassination attempt on the President (David Rasche), Agent Daggett is reassigned to protect the First Lady. Agent Daggett encounters problems with the First Lady (Delta Burke) who treats him like a servant instead of her body guard. He also has problems with an egotistical fellow agent, Edward Pillows (Stephen Dunham), the First Lady's secretary Ginger Chin (Lauren Tom), and the First couple's beautiful young daughter Camilla (Lea Moreno Young).

The series was originally scheduled on NBC's Tuesday night sitcom line up following 3rd Rock from the Sun at 9:30 EST. In January 2001, the series was moved to 8:30 timeslot, but was canceled the following May after one season.

== Cast ==
- David Alan Grier as Secret Service Agent Jerome "Dag" Daggett
- Hedy Burress (pilot) & Emmy Laybourne as Agent Susan Cole
- Stephen Dunham as Agent Edward Pillows
- Mel Jackson as Secret Service Agent Morton
- Lauren Tom as Secretary Ginger Chin
- Paul F. Tompkins as Chief of Staff Sullivan Pope
- Lea Moreno Young as Camilla Whitman
- Delta Burke as First Lady Judith Whitman
- David Rasche as President Whitman

== Episodes ==
No.	Title	Directed by	Written by	Original release date	Prod. code	Viewers (millions)
1	"Pilot"	John Fortenberry	Andy Gordon & Eileen Conn & Jack Burditt	November 14, 2000	001	15.52
While trying to adjust to his new job after being demoted, Dag's well-being is tested by the media, who have turned him into their new whipping boy; by his new, off-kilter co-workers, the B-Team; and by Judith, who thinks of him as nothing more than her own personal errand runner. In the midst of all this, Dag is forced into playing college counselor to Camilla when she announces that she doesn't want to go to college.
2	"Meet Sullivan Pope" "Dag's Prison"	John Fortenberry	Andy Gordon & Eileen Conn & Jack Burditt	November 21, 2000	003	13.14
Judith puts her foot down with President Whitman when Dag clues her in about the real reason why she still doesn't have a new Chief of Staff three months after the death of her former one. Dag jumps the gun and hires the very first candidate for the position, Sullivan Pope, but soon regrets it once he realizes that Sullivan is a major pain in the neck. Soon, everybody regrets it after Sullivan screws up royally in his efforts to choose a band to perform at a party for President Whitman's contributors. Meanwhile, Ginger ghostwrites Camilla's college application essay.
3	"Losing Judith"	John Fortenberry	Andy Gordon & Eileen Conn & Jack Burditt	November 28, 2000	005	13.64
WWF/WWE's The Rock pays a visit to the Oval Office in order to research a role in an action film, and quickly gets on Dag's last nerve. Dag, meanwhile, fears the loss of his new job when Judith is discovered missing and Agent Morton threatens to report it. What they don't know is that Camilla, feeling neglected after Judith cancelled a lunch on her, dragged her mother out for a make-up lunch—as well as some quality time together away from the secret service.
4	"The Return of Katherine Twigg"	Shelley Jensen	Drew Ogier	December 5, 2000	008	11.77
After reading in the paper that literacy rates are nearing an all-time low, Judith plans to launch a children's literacy program. Sullivan convinces her to start it with the highly popular former First Lady, Katherine Twigg, who was responsible for her own literacy program in the past. Feeling inferior, Judith goes out of her way to impress Katherine, but Katherine hates her anyway for trying to steal her campaign. After Katherine calls Judith a dumb hick, the two First Ladies get into it smack in the middle of the program's launch. Meanwhile, Katherine's head agent and Agent Pillows share some shocking revelations about her to Dag, while Camilla's new relationship with an intern, Steve, is intercepted every step of the way by Agent Cole.
5	"A Whitman Christmas Sampler"	John Fortenberry	Linda Videtti Figueiredo	December 12, 2000	006	11.08
While Christmas shopping at a department store, Judith becomes angry with President Whitman when he tries to make her pick out a present for his mother. The First Couple's feud soon turns personal for Dag and Agent Morton when they are forced to act as message relayers after Judith and the president stop speaking to one another. Also, Camilla tries to find the right gift for Steve.
6	"Jennifer Returns" "Coward's End"	John Fortenberry	Jay Dyer	December 19, 2000	004	8.63
Dag's ex-wife, Jennifer, starts things up again with him, but their newfound romance takes a return to the worse when Jennifer mentions Dag's on-the-job blunder. So Dag tries to prove he's not a coward to Jennifer during his training exercises under the supervision of his tough drill instructor, Agent Kelly. Meanwhile, Sullivan and Ginger duke it out for the role of Judith's favorite.
7	"The Interrogation"	John Fortenberry	Amber Mazzola	January 9, 2001	010	8.69
After a scandal involving a bad secret service agent is uncovered, Special Agent Nash launches strict background checks on the other agents. Dag thinks he's got nothing to fear, until Nash's interrogation reminds him of a past incident involving drugs and his participation in an anti-government organization (which is seen through a series of flashbacks). Meanwhile, Judith arranges a trip to India with Camilla in an effort to drive a wedge between her and Steve, and Agents Morton and Cole find they share a common bond—a fanatical fondness for Harry Potter.
8	"The Decoy"	John Fortenberry	Bryan Behar & Steve Baldikoski	January 16, 2001	011	9.13
Sullivan takes it upon himself to coach Agent Pillows after Pillows is assigned to decoy for President Whitman. Wanting to do a believable job, Pillows asks Judith questions about the president, but winds up learning more than he cared to know. Meanwhile, an already-ill Dag has a case of double vision with Agent Morton after experiencing some bad side effects from a flu shot.
9	"Off the Record" "The Not-So-Secret Service"	John Fortenberry	Michael Saltzman	January 30, 2001	012	7.60
Dag gets annoyed with Judith after she ruins the end of a book he was reading. Sullivan tries to fit in with the rest of the B-Team by joining them for a round of drinks in their favorite bar, Mikey J's, where Sullivan and Dag share anecdotes about Judith's quirks. Judith gets equally annoyed with Dag after Sullivan stabs him in the back and repeats his comments about her to make himself look better in Judith's eyes. When the rest of the B-Team find out that Sullivan stiffed their waitress, Sullivan retaliates by making up false complaints to the health department about Mikey J's, which is soon shut down. Dag and the others plot to get even with Sullivan while Dag simultaneously tries to smooth things over with Judith. Also, Steve breaks up with Camilla.
10	"Prom"	Dennie Gordon	Andy Gordon & Eileen Conn & Jack Burditt	February 6, 2001	015	8.17
Judith calls Dag after Camilla says that she doesn't want to go to her prom, because the Secret Service will be there. Since Camilla really wants to go with her new date, Jeremy, Dag compromises by offering her minimum visibility protection. In assigning positions, Sullivan becomes chaperone, and Cole, an undercover high school student. Judith arranges for Sullivan to hook up with a former prom date that could've been, Patti, only to find out while he's chaperoning what a menace she's become. Meanwhile, a heavily made-up Cole makes another attendee jealous when her boyfriend develops a wandering eye pointed squarely in Cole's direction. Judith defies Dag's orders and tags along with him to listen to things from the monitoring van. Judith's family stories cause Dag to blow up, claiming he doesn't care to know them if it doesn't involve his job. Dag proves he does care by saving the day after Jeremy is caught on the microphones saying that he's using Camilla to get a good tabloid story.
11	"Guns and Roses" "The Competition"	Dennie Gordon	Steven James Meyer	February 13, 2001	014	8.35
With Valentine's Day approaching, Dag hopes to get back in the saddle after becoming hot under the collar for Judith's fiery temp secretary, Gina Marie. Trouble is, Agent Morton's got his eye on her, too. When the pair find themselves competing for Gina's attention, they make a deal that neither will go out with her to preserve their friendship—a deal neither keeps. Also, Judith wishes to learn how to fire a handgun and enlists the aid of Agent Cole, while Sullivan seeks help from Agent Pillows to discover who his secret admirer is. Judith's attempts at shooting are a disaster, after which she confesses to Dag why she wanted to learn in the first place.
12	"America's Sweetheart"	John Fortenberry	Bryan Behar & Steve Baldikoski	February 20, 2001	002	8.02
Sullivan arranges for Judith to give a speech in honor of Olympic gold medallist, Becky Jo Jensen. The young athlete turns out to be so annoyingly spirited that Judith blows her top at her halfway through the media event. Now that they're both in the same boat, Dag offers Judith tips on what to do to save face with an angry public. Heeding his advice, Judith arranges another event to personally apologize to Becky Jo. But Dag copes with his own problem when he learns that Agent Morton is becoming President Whitman's friend and living the high life he never did. Meanwhile, Camilla begs Judith to let her get a tattoo, while Judith and Sullivan fall mouth-over-heels for Dag's special blend of coffee—coffee he insists is right out of a bag.
13	"Basketball Jones"	Don Scardino	Story by : Arthur Harris; Teleplay by : Andy Gordon & Eileen Conn & Jack Burditt	March 27, 2001	016	7.90
The hard-nosed head of the F.B.I., Betty Winn, pays the White House a visit and crushes Judith's plans to start up an F.B.I.-endorsed youth crime-prevention program. Betty's passing mention of an upcoming basketball match between the Secret Service and the F.B.I. invokes Judith to hedge a bet between the two: if the Secret Service's team beats the F.B.I.'s, Betty will agree to provide agents for Judith's crime program. Only there's just one problem; the F.B.I. never loses. Dag agrees to coach the B-Team, hires a ringer to help sway the odds in their favor, and becomes so confident of their chances of winning that he makes a side bet with the F.B.I. Unfortunately for the B-Team, Dag's secret weapon—Agent Freddy "Shooter" Jones—is not quite the b-ball superstar Dag was led to believe.
14	"Smoke"	Andrew Tsao	Bill Kunstler	April 3, 2001	007	7.49
Dag tries to keep Judith's smoking habit under wraps, which is no easy feat after she accidentally lights the AIDS quilt on fire. Judith blames it on the Secret Service, and Morton soon believes Dag is the one who's smoking. Judith twists around Dag's advice and decides to launch an anti-smoking campaign to boost her approval rating—even though she has no intention of quitting herself. Camilla pulls a stint that causes her mother to get caught in the act in front of her campaignees. Dag uses Camilla to get Judith to quit, the same way he quit himself years ago. But Judith's campaign sparks a visit from a tobacco lobbyist, Senator Culpepper, who is none too pleased about her new goal, and schemes to get her to start smoking again. Meanwhile, after a pact is made, Agent Cole threatens to smash Pillows' pinky with a hammer if he eats meat.
15	"Going Places"	John Fortenberry	Andy Gordon & Eileen Conn & Jack Burditt	April 10, 2001	017	6.08
It's the president's birthday, and everybody plans a party for him. Judith becomes jealous when President Whitman invites Playboy's Miss March to come. Sullivan is having an internet fling with a girl named Jodi and considers going to Ohio to meet her, even though Ginger swears he's typing to an old man. Camilla gets accepted to Harvard, and Agent Cole is unhappy that she will have to leave the White House in six weeks to accompany her. Judith is upset when Miss March winds up at the president's table for his birthday dinner. Dag sees that Miss March is about to feed the president coconut cake—which he's allergic to—and, this time, jumps in the way to save him... injuring Miss March in the process. Grateful to Dag for saving his life, President Whitman promotes him back to the A-Team—at the expense of Morton, who's demoted to the B-Team. Agent Pillows gets depressed that Cole is leaving, but, to Dag's dismay, Judith doesn't seem to care in the least that he's leaving her. Sullivan decides to leave the White House altogether to be with Jodi—until Ginger expresses her love for him. Dag confronts Judith to demand a proper goodbye when he discovers that she gave them—and gifts—to Sullivan and Cole.
16	"Mr. Daggett Goes to Washington"	Bob Levy	Arthur Harris	May 29, 2001	013	4.89
Dag asks Agents Cole and Pillows to lie for him and pretend he's still working for the A-Team, as his father, Russell, is in town and Dag is too ashamed to tell him he's been demoted. The elder Daggett finds out anyway—and makes Dag feel even more ashamed. Russell, a champion in putt-putt, guilts his son into a match. Which is not too hard since Dag wants to give his over-critical old man something to be proud of. Meanwhile, Judith forces Camilla to redo a term paper she turned in that compared McCarthyism to Felicity and Britney Spears. Of course, the First Lady is unaware at the time that Sullivan wrote it—and Camilla paid him a hundred dollars for it. And Russell knows a few incriminating things about Ginger from his former career as a beat cop, while Cole can't seem to take the hint that her dad is gay.
17	"The Triangle Report"	Kevin S. Bright	Tiffany Zehnal	Unaired	009	N/A

== Reception ==
Robert Bianco of USA Today said it "should have been funnier but wasn't a total star vehicle disaster like "Bette" or "The Michael Richards Show"." Hal Boedeker of the Orlando Sentinel said it "Flat, old-fashioned DAG wastes David Alan Grier and Delta Burke -- an impeachable comedy offense."

== Award nominations ==
Year	Award	Category	Recipient	Result
2001	ADG Excellence in Production Design Awards	Television – Episode of a Multi-Camera Series	Bryan Lane (assistant art director) and Bernard Vyzga (production designer) (For episode "Return of Katherine Twigg")	Nominated
2001	TV Guide Awards	Actress of the Year in a New Series	Delta Burke	Nominated
