= Sophie Girard =

Sophie Girard may refer to:

- Sophie Girard, character in Last Resort (TV series)
- Sophie Girard, character, see List of True Jackson, VP episodes
