= Get Over It =

Get Over It may refer to:

== Albums ==
- Get Over It (album), a 2000 album by Mr. Big
- Get Over It (The Nextmen album), a 2003 album by The Nextmen
- Get Over It! (album), a 2009 album by Care Bears on Fire

== Songs ==
- "Get Over It" (MC Kinky song)
- "Get Over It" (Eagles song)
- "Get Over It" (OK Go song)
- "Get Over It" (Guillemots song)
- "Get Over It", a song by Avril Lavigne, the B-side of the single "Sk8er Boi"
- "Get Over It", a song by McBusted from McBusted
- "Get Over It", a song by Ed Sheeran from -
- "Get Over It", a song by Lower Than Atlantis

== Other uses ==
- Get Over It (film), a 2001 film starring Kirsten Dunst
- Get Over It!, the 2011 FIRST Tech Challenge game

== See also ==
- Forgiveness
- Getting Over It with Bennett Foddy, a 2017 video game.
- Over It (disambiguation)
