= Everyday People (film) =

- Written by: Jim McKay
- Directed by: Jim McKay
- Starring: Jordan Gelber; Bridget Barkan; Stephen McKinley Henderson; Sydnee Stewart; Billoah Greene; Reg E. Cathey; Steve Axelrod; Ron Butler
- Music by: Marc Anthony Thompson
- Country of origin: United States
- Original language: English

Production
- Executive producers: Nelson George; Caldecot Chubb; Sean Daniel; Jim McKay; Michael Stipe
- Producers: Effie T. Brown; Paul Mezey
- Cinematography: Russell Lee Fine
- Editor: Alex Hall
- Running time: 81 minutes
- Production companies: Alphaville Films; Urban Romances; C-Hundred Film Corp.

Original release
- Network: HBO
- Release: June 26, 2004

Everyday People is a 2004 American drama television film written and directed by Jim McKay. The storyline revolves around the lives of the employees working at a restaurant in Brooklyn, New York City, which is to be closed down due to economic shortfall. The film first screened at the 2004 Sundance Film Festival and later premiered on HBO on June 26, 2004.

== Plot ==
The film takes place on a day in Brooklyn. The owner of a neighborhood diner has decided to shut down his restaurant but, on the day of the deal, he reconsiders, realizing that people's lives depend on it. In the meantime, this shutdown announcement puts a heavy impact on the employees, as they become uncertain about the future. The movie does not have an explicit ending as to whether the diner was shut down or not.

== Cast ==
- Jordan Gelber as Ira
- Stephen McKinley Henderson as Arthur
- muMs da Schemer as Ali
- Reg E. Cathey as Akbar
- Ron Butler as Ron Harding
- Jamie Hector as Devon
- Steve Axelrod as Sol
- Earl Baker Jr. as Benjamin
- Bridget Barkan as Joleen
- Kalimi Baxter as Ruby
- Ron Ben Israel as Walter
- Stephanie Berry as Angry Black Waiter
- Miles Bridgett as Joleen's Son
- David Brummel as Ira's Father
- Kadijah Carlisle as Benita
- Julia Carothers Hughes as Miss Meyers
- Frantz G. Saint Louis Jr. as Frantz

== Reception ==
The film has an approval rating of 67% based on 9 reviews on Rotten Tomatoes. Positive reviews praised the film for its genuine representation of the struggles of low-income people. Keith Phipps of The A.V. Club wrote, "Though it lacks some of the New York naturalism of McKay's wonderful, little-seen Our Song, the ensemble drama still makes a quiet, passionate argument that places where patrons can ask for their regular spot are what make a neighborhood, whatever the allure of bright lights and brand names."

Reviewing for Variety, David Rooney finds the film to have a melancholy mood and notes the mix of characters and the interplay between them. He singles out the performances of Bridget Barkan and Billoah Greene as effortlessly moving.

The film was nominated for four Black Reel Awards in 2005 in the categories of Best Supporting Actor, Best Supporting Actress, and Best Screenplay.
