= Tropix (film) =

Independent film made in Costa Rica by Percy Angress and Livia Linden

Tropix is a 2002 independent film directed by Costa Rica–based Americans Percy Angress and Livia Linden. The film is one of the few independent films made in Costa Rica. It was released in the US on DVD in 2004. It was filmed in Guápiles, and San José. The film stars Danielle Bisutti, Ryan Barton-Grimley, and Keith Brunsmann.

== Cast ==
- Danielle Bisutti as Corrine Findlay
- Thomas Scott Stanton as Guy Findlay
- Ryan Barton-Grimley as Nicky
- Keith Brunsmann as Joaquim
- Michelle Jones as Solange
- Elizabeth Liang as Beachnik Chick
- Ronald Nitschke as Pool Pundit
- Freddy Viquez as Resort Bartender
