= Mystery Girls =

American sitcom

- Genre: Sitcom; Mystery
- Created by: Shepard Boucher; Tori Spelling
- Starring: Tori Spelling; Jennie Garth; Miguel Pinzon
- Theme music composer: Bert Selen
- Composers: Bert Selen and George Ritter
- Country of origin: United States
- Original language: English
- No. of seasons: 1
- No. of episodes: 10

Production
- Executive producers: Shepard Boucher; Maggie Malina; Tori Spelling; John Ziffren; Jennie Garth; Andy Gordon
- Producers: Timothy Marx; David Hartle
- Running time: 22 minutes
- Production company: ProdCo Original

Original release
- Network: ABC Family
- Release: June 25 – August 27, 2014

Mystery Girls is an American sitcom starring Tori Spelling and Jennie Garth that aired on ABC Family on June 25 through August 27, 2014. The series follows Holly and Charlie, former stars of the fictional 1990s TV detective series Mystery Girls who reunite to solve actual mysteries.

On September 8, 2014, it was cancelled after one season of ten episodes.

== Cast ==
=== Main cast ===
- Tori Spelling as Holly Hamilton, a vivacious, ditzy and fame-hungry former TV star who opens a detective agency.
- Jennie Garth as Charlie Contour, Holly's practical, tough and witty former co-star; she is married with a teenage daughter, and joins Holly to put a little excitement back into her life.
- Miguel Pinzon as Nick Diaz, an enthusiastic and excitable Mystery Girls super fan who persuades Holly and Charlie to hire him as their assistant.

=== Recurring cast ===
- Adam Mayfield as Michael, Charlie's husband
- Ryan McPartlin as Police Detective Dwayne Freeman

== Production ==
In October 2013, ABC Family announced Garth's addition to a comedy pilot co-created by and starring Spelling. Noting the project to be a reunion of the Beverly Hills, 90210 costars, the network stated that Spelling, Garth and Maggie Malina would be executive producers, and cited Shepard Boucher as Spelling's co-creator. The series pickup was announced in January 2014, and in March 2014 the premiere date was set for June 25, 2014. On September 8, 2014, Mystery Girls was cancelled after one season of ten episodes.

== Broadcast ==
In Turkey, the series aired on Dizimax Comedy. The show started on December 19, 2014.

== Episodes ==
No.	Title	Directed by	Written by	Original release date	Prod. code	U.S. viewers (millions)
1	"Death Becomes Her"	Michael Lembeck	Elaine Aronson	June 25, 2014	103	0.76
Holly enlists Charlie to help her retrieve an old sex tape of hers which has been put up for sale on the internet.
2	"Partners in Crime"	Michael Lembeck	Shepard Boucher	July 2, 2014	104	0.45
Holly and Charlie try to catch the perpetrators robbing celebrity homes.
3	"Haunted House Party"	Rob Schiller	Sivert Glarum & Michael Jamin	July 9, 2014	102	0.58
Holly and Charlie stay the night in a haunted house.
4	"Pilot"	Michael Lembeck	Shepard Boucher	July 16, 2014	101	N/A
In an interview with Nancy O'Dell, Charlie relates how she and Holly were reunited and their Mystery Girls detective agency was born.
5	"High School Mystery"	Bob Koherr	Jay Baxter & Shaun Zaken	July 23, 2014	106	0.42
Holly and Charlie go undercover at Holly's old high school to prevent a prank against the principal (Joe E. Tata).
6	"Sister Issues"	Gil Junger	Erica Spates & Sam Littenberg-Weisberg	July 30, 2014	107	0.49
Holly tries to impress her visiting sister (Kim Shaw) by using Nick and his acting class to stage a case in a bar.
7	"Passing the Torch"	Rob Schiller	Andy Gordon	August 6, 2014	105	0.39
Holly and Charlie become suspects when the two actresses set to star in a reboot of their old series disappear.
8	"Bag Ladies"	Gil Junger	Shepard Boucher	August 13, 2014	109	0.55
Holly and Charlie go undercover at a fashion show to locate a one-of-a-kind stolen purse.
9	"Death Rose"	Bob Koherr	Sivert Glarum & Michael Jamin	August 20, 2014	108	0.41
The prisoner whom Holly played in a TV movie is released.
10	"The Killer Returns"	Michael Lembeck	Andy Gordon	August 27, 2014	110	0.54
Holly and Charlie face a killer.

== Critical response ==
Allison Keene of The Hollywood Reporter said, "Playing up the meta appeal and jokes related to Spelling and Garth working together again, this show is silly and harmless fun." Gail Pennington of St. Louis Post-Dispatch gave the show two out of four stars, saying "Before they know it, the two have opened a detective agency together... the first half-hour is devoted to that setup, so we have to assume further episodes will find the "Girls" haplessly solving various quirky crimes." On Rotten Tomatoes, the series has an aggregated score of 69% based on 9 positive and 4 negative critic reviews. The website’s consensus reads: " Though the execution is typical, the corny jokes and broad acting make Mystery Girls a fun, sentimental throwback sitcom that benefits from the nostalgic reunion of Tori Spelling and Jennie Garth." On Metacritic, the series has a score of 51 out of 100 based on 11 critic reviews, indicating "Mixed to Average"
