= Hot Properties =

American sitcom

- Genre: Sitcom
- Created by: Suzanne Martin
- Starring: Gail O'Grady; Nicole Sullivan; Sofia Vergara; Christina Moore; Evan Handler; Stephen Dunham; Amy Hill
- Composer: Jeff Rona
- Country of origin: United States
- Original language: English
- No. of seasons: 1
- No. of episodes: 13

Production
- Executive producer: Suzanne Martin
- Producers: Valerie Ahern; Christian McLaughlin; Gail O'Grady
- Camera setup: Multi-camera
- Running time: 21 minutes
- Production companies: SamJen Productions; Warner Bros. Television

Original release
- Network: ABC
- Release: October 7 – December 30, 2005

Hot Properties is an American sitcom featuring four women working together in a Manhattan real estate office and aired on ABC from October 7 to December 30, 2005.

== Plot ==
Often compared to Sex and the City and the CBS situation comedy Designing Women, this show features four single women professionals, each with distinct personalities that contribute in their failure to secure dates. The women share a passion for Oprah.

== Cast ==
Actor	Character
Gail O'Grady	Ava Summerlin
Nicole Sullivan	Chloe Reid
Sofía Vergara	Lola Hernandez
Christina Moore	Emerson Ives
Evan Handler	Dr. Sellers Boyd
Stephen Dunham	Dr. Charlie Thorpe
Amy Hill	Mary

=== Characters ===
- Ava is the forty-nine-year-old executive of the Hot Properties real estate firm. Her husband is half her age, but he is not aware of her age. Ava is madly in love with him, and hopes to raise a family.
- Chloe is down to earth, sarcastic, and relies on self-help books for personal advice. She is very desperate to get married, but keeps dating the wrong men.
- Lola is a curvy Latina who has emerged from a recent divorce, after her husband came out as gay. Throughout the show, men stare at her and compete for Lola's attention, to which she is often oblivious. Lola's desire for handsome men often leads her in pursuit of gay men, resulting in disappointment. As a result, she is often afraid to go dating. Lola hopes to improve her "gaydar" in order to avoid future disappointments.
- Emerson is young and rich, with little work experience. She was engaged, but upon discovering that the fiancée was not a virgin, broke it off. She bonds instantly with her roommates.

== Episodes ==
No.	Title	Directed by	Written by	Original release date
1	"Pilot"	Andy Ackerman	Suzanne Martin	October 7, 2005
Chloe and Ava find out that they both had a fling with the fiancé of one of their clients, Emerson Ives, who thinks that her fiancé is a virgin like she is. Ava also goes to a fertility specialist with her husband, Lola tries to re-enter the dating world, and Chloe finds out that no man has ever been "that into her."
2	"Chick Stuff"	Andy Ackerman	Chuck Ranberg & Anne Flett-Giordano	October 14, 2005
Lola is really upset after her pet chicken dies and Ava tries to make her better by inviting all the girls over to her apartment.
3	"Online Dating"	Jeff Melman	Sebastian Jones	October 21, 2005
Lola, Chloe and Emerson sign up for an internet dating service. Lola pretends that she's a gay man after she sees her ex-husband on the website.
4	"Sex, Lies & Chubby Chasers"	Andy Ackerman	Suzanne Martin	October 28, 2005
The women at the office encourage each other to take some risks. Lola starts therapy with Sellers to find out why she's attracted to so many gay men.
5	"Dating Up, Dating Down"	Jeff Melman	Andy Gordon	November 4, 2005
Everyone analyses 'dating up' and 'dating down' after Charlie tells them that he's invested in a night club so he can date hot supermodels.
6	"Waiting for Oprah"	Jeff Melman	Pamela Ribon	November 11, 2005
The women have a real estate sale and to celebrate, Ava purchases tickets for each of them to attend a taping of one of Oprah's shows in Chicago.
7	"Return of the Ring"	Jeff Melman	Andy Gordon	November 15, 2005
Emerson tries to return her $50,000 engagement ring to Graham, but she is too scared because she is worried about what her feelings will be after she sees him.
8	"When Chloe Met Marco"	Jeff Melman	Valerie Ahern & Christian McLaughlin	November 18, 2005
The ladies lose a sale and to make themselves feel better they clean out their purses. However, during the process, Emerson finds the receipt for her wedding dress, which she never wore.
9	"Whatever Lola Wants"	Jeff Melman	Sebastian Jones	November 25, 2005
Chloe challenges Lola to make herself look plain and ugly to find out whether people will be less attracted to her.
10	"It's a Wonderful Christmas Carol on 34th Street"	Jeff Melman	Valerie Ahern & Christian McLaughlin	December 9, 2005
Chloe bails on a charity Christmas party, and when her taxi crashes, the ghosts of Christmas Past, Present, and Future, appearing to her as the three other ladies, show her the error of her ways.
11	"Killer Bodies"	Jeff Melman	Chuck Ranberg & Anne Flett-Giordano	December 16, 2005
Lola's average-looking boyfriend Fletcher is rushed to the hospital after a mysterious heart attack which appears to have been caused by Lola's sex appeal.
12	"GRRR"	Jeff Melman	Pamela Ribon	December 23, 2005
Ava wonders if her happy marriage is in trouble and feels a little guilty when sparks fly between her and a client named Alec who, like her, has a much younger partner.
13	"El Dia de Compasion"	Jeff Melman	Chuck Ranberg & Anne Flett-Giordano	December 30, 2005
Everyone is invited to Lola's house to celebrate El Dia de Compasion, a traditional holiday from her country.

== Reception ==
The show received a largely negative critical reception, with review aggregator website Rotten Tomatoes reported a 30% approval rating, based on 10 reviews. The website's consensus reads, "Not actually very hot at all, Hot Properties' attempts at feminine empowerment sink fast amid its many cliches, poor writing, and a baffling lack of good jokes." Another review aggregator Metacritic awarding it 31 out of 100 based on 22 reviews, indicating "generally unfavorable reviews". Tim Goodman of the San Francisco Chronicle called the show "stupid and annoying", along with fellow ABC sitcom Freddie.

== International broadcasters ==
Country	Broadcaster	Series Premiere	Timeslot
Australia	Nine HD	Wednesday, August 6, 2008	Wednesdays at 11pm (Last episode aired on November 5)
Germany	Comedy Central	Monday, November 26, 2007	Wednesdays at 1:30am
Poland	TVN 7		Saturday mornings
Brazil	Warner Channel		Friday nights (2006)
Romania	PRO Cinema	Monday, September 7, 2009	Monday - Wednesday (two episodes/day)
Republic of Ireland	TV3 Ireland	Thursday 12 January 2006	22:30
