= Over It =

Over It may refer to:

- Over It (band), an American pop punk band
- Over It (album), a 2019 album by Summer Walker, or the title track
- Over It (EP), an EP by face to face
- "Over It" (Katharine McPhee song)
- "Over It", a song by Anneliese van der Pol from the soundtrack of the 2004 film Stuck in the Suburbs
- "Over It", a song by Ashley Tisdale from Headstrong
- "Over It", a song by Dinosaur Jr. from Farm
- "Over It", a song by Macklemore from Gemini
- "Over It", a song by Jordan Pruitt from No Ordinary Girl
- "Over It", a song by Relient K from Forget and Not Slow Down
- "Over It", a song by Stereo Skyline from Stuck on Repeat
- "Over It", a song by Tiffany Affair

== See also ==
- Get Over It (disambiguation)
