= No Greater Love (2010 film) =

- Film poster
- Directed by: Brad J. Silverman
- Written by: Brad J. Silverman; James Killian; Elizabeth Killian; Brandon Rice
- Produced by: Matt Green
- Starring: Anthony Tyler Quinn; Danielle Bisutti; Jay Underwood
- Cinematography: Geoff Reisner
- Edited by: Brandon Rice
- Distributed by: Lionsgate
- Release date: January 19, 2010
- Running time: 109 minutes
- Country: United States
- Language: English

No Greater Love is a 2010 Christian film directed by Brad J. Silverman. Lionsgate announced it acquired the North American home entertainment distribution rights to the film. Shot mostly on location in Lancaster, California, the film stars Anthony Tyler Quinn, Danielle Bisutti and Jay Underwood. It was released to DVD on January 19, 2010, and featured at the Projecting Hope Film Festival. Thomas Nelson Publishing has released a book titled, No Greater Love: A 90-day Devotional to Strengthen Your Marriage.

== Cast ==
- Anthony Tyler Quinn as Jeff Baker
- Danielle Bisutti as Heather Stroud
- Jay Underwood as Dave
- Aaron Sanders as Ethan Baker
- Alexis Boozer as Katie Saunders

== Release ==
According to Amazon.com, "Christian romance, No Greater Love, has claimed the No. 1 Hot New DVD best-seller position in both the Religious as well as the Family Life drama categories of Amazon.com."

=== Reception ===
A columnist for The Blade said, "No Greater Love is very well crafted, however, and holds your interest as you wonder whether or how this couple and their young son can ever be reconciled after the long and bizarre separation." No Greater Love has been endorsed by many Christian organizations, including the American Family Association and FamilyLife.
