= Get Over It! (album) =

Studio album by Care Bears on Fire
- Released: July 14, 2009
- Genre: Pop rock; pop punk
- Length: 34:48
- Label: S-Curve

Care Bears on Fire chronology
I Stole Your Animal (2007)	Get Over It! (2009)	Girls Like It Loud (2010)

Get Over It! is the second full-length album by American pop punk band Care Bears on Fire, released on S-Curve Records on July 14, 2009. While the band wrote most of the material themselves, they collaborated with Adam Schlesinger of Fountains of Wayne and Travis Clark of We the Kings on a handful of songs.

== Critical reception ==
Professional ratings
Review scores
Source	Rating
AllMusic	3/5 stars

Jason Lymangrover of AllMusic found that the album's music more closely resembled "mall-punk" in the vein of "the type of rock you might hear on Radio Disney", but wrote that "the girls do manage to channel the punk spirit of yesteryear with bratty adolescent rebelliousness", while highlighting the tracks "that break away from bratty exclamations and explore the true issues of being a teenage girl". Robert Christgau found the album "mildly enjoyable", describing it as "bratty-dreaming-slutty, its assorted putdowns less punk than they thought".

== Track listing ==
No.	Title	Writer(s)	Length
1.	"Pleaser"	Sophie Kasakove; Isadora Schappell-Spillman; Stephen Lironi	2:55
2.	"Superteen"	Kasakove; Schappell-Spillman; Jena Gilbert-Merrill; Jill Cunniff	2:25
3.	"Everybody Else"	Kasakove; Schappell-Spillman	2:00
4.	"Barbie Eat a Sandwich"	Kasakove; Schappell-Spillman; Adam Schlesinger	2:13
5.	"My Problems"	Kasakove; Schappell-Spillman; Schlesinger	1:58
6.	"Heart's Not There"	Kasakove	2:50
7.	"Gym Class Haze"	Kasakove; Schappell-Spillman; Travis Clark	2:21
8.	"Boy Song #1"	Kasakove; Schappell-Spillman	2:05
9.	"Get Over It"	Kasakove; Schappell-Spillman; Clark	2:25
10.	"Violet"	Kasakove; Schappell-Spillman	3:20
11.	"Met You on MySpace"	Kasakove; Schappell-Spillman; Lucio Westmoreland	2:25
12.	"You Can't Make Me"	Kasakove; Sam Hollander; Dave Katz	2:11
13.	"Only Know by Name"	Kasakove	2:55
14.	"Song About You"	Kasakove; Schappell-Spillman; Hollander; Katz	2:45
Total length:			34:48
