= Stephen Dunham =

American actor

- Born: Stephen Dunham Bowers; September 14, 1964; Boston, Massachusetts, U.S.
- Died: September 14, 2012 (aged 48); Burbank, California, U.S.
- Other name: Stephen Bowers
- Occupation: Actor
- Years active: 1983–2012
- Spouse: Alexondra Lee (m. 2005)

Stephen Dunham (September 14, 1964 – September 14, 2012) was an American actor, best known for his role as Edward Pillows in the series DAG and known internationally for his roles as Isaac Henderson in The Mummy and Dr. Paul Chamberlain in Monster-in-Law. He also played Doug Nelson in Paranormal Activity 4 (2012).

== Personal life ==
Stephen Dunham was born Stephen Dunham Bowers in Boston, Massachusetts on September 14, 1964 to Frederick Bowers and Sandra Dunham. He grew up in Manchester, New Hampshire. He was married to actress Alexondra Lee.

== Career ==
Dunham was perhaps best known for his role as Isaac Henderson in the hit 1999 film The Mummy. He had originally auditioned for the role of Rick O'Connell and was unsuccessful, however, director Stephen Sommers liked Dunham's acting enough to cast him as Henderson instead. Following this, he played Hunter Franklin on the short-lived sitcom Oh, Grow Up and Agent Edward Pillows in 17 episodes of DAG from 2000 to 2001.

He played the recurring role Peter in season 2 of What I Like About You and was also known for his role as Charlie Thorpe in Hot Properties. He acted in dozens of other television shows and major films. He appeared as Dr. Paul Chamberlain Monster-in-Law (2005), The Bill Engvall Show (2007), Chad on True Jackson, VP and had an appearance in Get Smart (2008).

In 2011, he appeared on Hot in Cleveland, playing an Amish bartender, and in 2012, before his death, he played his final role as Doug Nelson in Paranormal Activity 4 alongside his real life wife Alexondra Lee.

== Death ==
He suffered a heart attack and died on September 14, 2012, his 48th birthday, in Burbank, California. The end credits of Paranormal Activity 4 include a dedication to him.

== Filmography ==
=== Film ===
Year	Title	Role	Notes
1987	You Talkin' to Me?		Uncredited
1995	Nonstop Pyramid Action	Nick	Short
1999	The Mummy	Isaac Henderson	
2000	Nothing Sacred	Matt	
2000	Traffic	Lobbyist	
2002	Catch Me If You Can	Pilot #2	
2003	Anger Management	Maitre d'	
2005	Monster-in-Law	Dr. Paul Chamberlain	
2008	Get Smart	Secret Service Commander	
2012	Savages	Six	Uncredited
2012	Paranormal Activity 4	Doug Nelson	Released posthumously

=== Television ===
Year	Title	Role	Notes
1990	Grand	Repairman	Episode: Janice Steals Home
1999	Oh, Grow Up	Hunter Franklin	12 episodes; also executive producer
2000–2001	DAG	Agent Edward Pillows	17 episodes
2002	The Chronicle	Louis Phillips	2 episodes
2002	Presidio Med		Episode: When Approaching a Let-Go
2003	Just Shoot Me!	Andrew the Environmentalist	Episode: A Simple Kiss of Fate
2003	What I Like About You	Peter	8 episodes
2005	Hot Properties	Dr. Charlie Thorpe	13 episodes
2009	The Bill Engvall Show	Danny	3 episodes
2008–2010	True Jackson, VP	Chad Brackett	2 episodes
2011	Hot in Cleveland	Abner	Episode: Where's Elka?
