= Andy Gordon =

American screenwriter

- Born: Andrew Gordon
- Occupations: Producer; writer
- Years active: 1986–present
- Spouse: Carlo Brandon-Gordon

Andrew Gordon is an American television producer and writer, based in Los Angeles, California. He is known for creating and producing the teen sitcom True Jackson, VP. He has also written and produced on other popular shows such as The Big Bang Theory and Modern Family.

== Works ==
He has written and produced for 1986 series Dennis the Menace, Kids Incorporated, Get a Life, Mad About You, Dream On, NewsRadio, Just Shoot Me!, Complete Savages, The Loop, Hot Properties, Modern Family, and DAG. In 2008, Gordon created the Nickelodeon sitcom, True Jackson, VP.

Television shows produced
Year	Title	
2023	Call Me Kat	Consulting producer
2021-22	United States of Al	Co-executive producer
2017–19	The Big Bang Theory	Co-executive producer
2015–17	Modern Family	Co-executive producer
2014	Mystery Girls	Executive producer
2013–14	Kirstie	Co-executive producer
2013	Twang (TV Movie)	Executive producer
2011	Last Man Standing	Co-executive producer (8 episodes), Executive producer (15 episodes)
2008–11	True Jackson, VP	Creator, executive producer
2007–08	Back to You	Co-executive producer
2008	Bobbys Back: The Comeback Tour	Producer
2007	The Loop	Co-executive producer
2005	Hot Properties	Co-executive producer
2004–05	Complete Savages	Co-executive producer
2000	DAG	Executive producer
1999	My Wife (short)	Producer
1997–99	Just Shoot Me!	Co-executive producer
1995–97	NewsRadio	Supervising producer
1993–95	Mad About You	Co-producer

== Personal Life ==
Gordon is married to Carlo Brandon-Gordon.
