= True Jackson, VP =

American television sitcom (2008–2011)

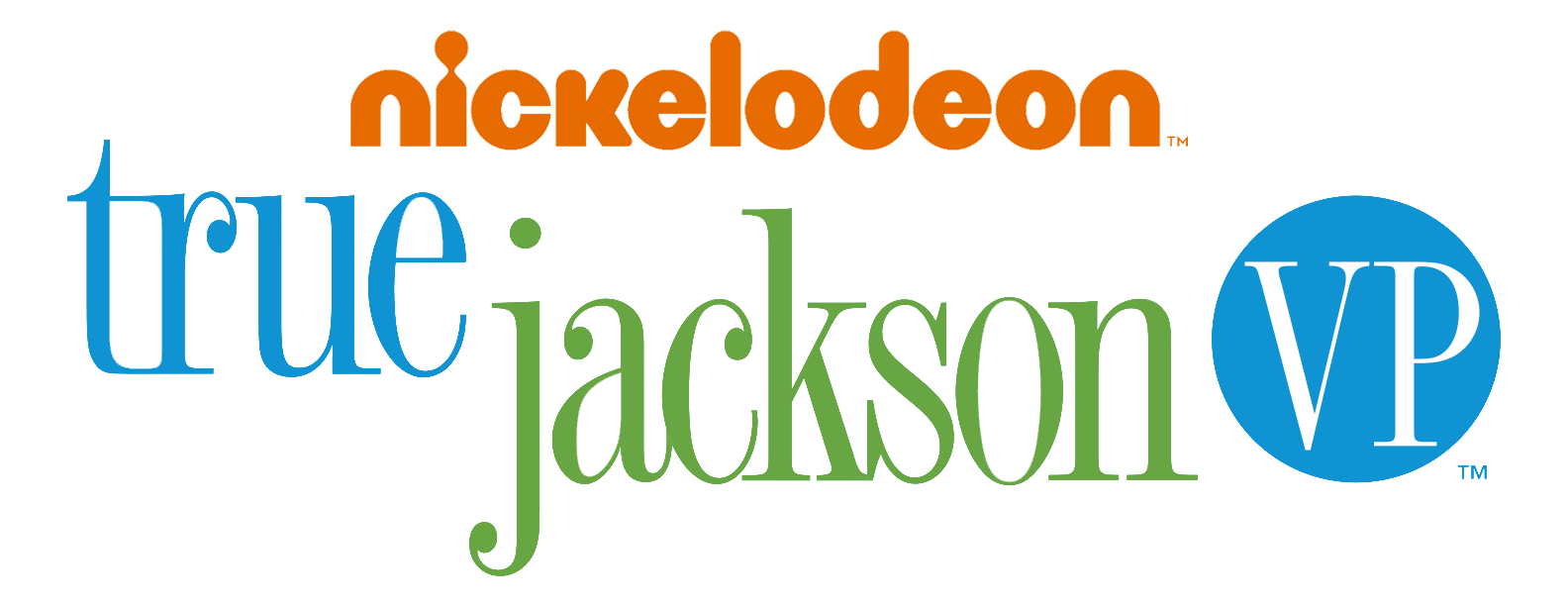
- Genre: Teen sitcom
- Created by: Andy Gordon
- Showrunner: Andy Gordon
- Starring: Keke Palmer; Ashley Argota; Matt Shively; Danielle Bisutti; Robbie Amell; Ron Butler; Greg Proops
- Theme music composer: Toby Gad; Keke Palmer
- Opening theme: "Change It Up" by Keke Palmer
- Composer: Eban Schletter
- Country of origin: United States
- Original language: English
- No. of seasons: 3
- No. of episodes: 56 (list of episodes)

Production
- Executive producers: Andy Gordon; Dan Kopelman (season 2); Steve Joe (season 3)
- Producers: Gary Halvorson; Chris R. Robinson
- Production locations: Nickelodeon on Sunset, Hollywood, California (2008–2009); Paramount Studios, Hollywood, California (2009–2011)
- Cinematography: Gregg Heschong
- Editor: Brent Carpenter
- Camera setup: Videotape (filmized); multi-camera
- Running time: 23 minutes
- Production companies: Gordon 3000 Industries; Nickelodeon Productions

Original release
- Network: Nickelodeon
- Release: November 8, 2008 – August 20, 2011

True Jackson, VP is an American teen sitcom created by Andy Gordon that aired on Nickelodeon from November 8, 2008, to August 20, 2011. The series stars Keke Palmer as a teenager whose interest in fashion leads her to become vice president at a major fashion company. The series co-stars Ashley Argota, Matt Shively, Danielle Bisutti, Greg Proops, Robbie Amell, and Ron Butler.

Developed to center around Palmer, the series was shot before a live audience while utilizing a laugh track for sweetening. Palmer also performed the theme song, co-written with Toby Gad. The series was successful for Nickelodeon, with the pilot episode garnering 4.8 million viewers on its first airing, and setting network records among kids 6–9, tweens 11–14, and several other demographics.

On May 5, 2009, Nickelodeon renewed the series for a second season, which premiered on November 14. With the episode order expanded to 34 episodes (31 with hour-long episodes combined), the season was split to create a third and final season. In August 2011, Palmer posted a video to her YouTube account confirming the end of the series. and posted on her blog, confirming that "Mystery in Peru" is the series' finale. She renewed her contract with Nickelodeon, doing voiceover work for Winx Club and starring in the television film Rags.

== Premise ==
Fifteen-year-old True Jackson is selling sandwiches and lemonade with her friend Ryan in the fashion district of New York City when she is complimented by fashion designer Max Madigan, founder and CEO of Mad Style. Max realizes the clothes True is wearing are his designs, but True had altered them to suit her own purposes. Max likes the modified design and hires True as Vice President of his fashion company's youth apparel division. True hires her best friend Lulu to be her assistant after firing Cricket, her former assistant, who was upset and bitter about being surpassed in the business world by a child. True must juggle teenage antics with her new role as VP, aided by her friends and coworkers.

== Episodes ==
Season	Episodes	Originally released	
Season	Episodes	First released	Last released
1	25	November 8, 2008	October 24, 2009
2	18	November 14, 2009	August 7, 2010
3	13	September 11, 2010	August 20, 2011

== Cast ==
=== Main ===
The show's main cast, from left to right: Danielle Bisutti, Matt Shively, Ashley Argota, Greg Proops, Keke Palmer, Ron Butler, and Robbie Amell

- Keke Palmer as True Jackson, a teenager who serves as the Vice President of the Youth Fashion Department at Mad Style. She is an intelligent, optimistic, hardworking young woman who values her friendships and acquaintances and tries to find humor in even the worst of situations. She often uses her skills and personality to get out of mishaps and situations. She has a crush on Mr. Madigan's nephew Jimmy from the start of the series, and they eventually become a couple.
- Ashley Argota as Lulu, True's best friend and assistant. She is loud, clueless, and often easily distracted. These traits often mask her high intelligence and love of math. However, she is a loyal and kind friend to True and Ryan, the latter of whom she constantly bashes. Lulu suffers from trichophagia and is also afraid of birds (as she mentions to True in one episode, "They give me the creeps but I'm not sure why"). Her last name was not revealed during the series. She has a boyfriend named Mikey J.
- Matt Shively as Ryan Leslie Laserbeam, True's other best friend. He is unintelligent, clumsy, and goofy friend who holds hyperfixations. He often pulls pranks or tries to lighten the mood at times that are unnecessary or inappropriate, and in ways that often cause injury to him or others. He hangs around at Mad Style with True and Lulu despite not holding an official job there, which is constantly pointed out by others. He dislikes his middle name, while his surname was given to one of his ancestors by a crew captain while working on a ship.
- Danielle Bisutti as Amanda Cantwell, True's co-worker who is the Vice President of Women's Fashion. She is vain, rude, materialistic, sarcastic, which masks deep insecurities related to her past as a "dork." Initially embittered by True's seniority within the company despite her youth, Amanda frequently disagrees and belittles her, and works to sabotage her. Over the course of the series, she warms to True and her friends.
- Robbie Amell as Jimmy Madigan, nephew of Max and True's love interest. As Mad Style's mailroom delivery boy, Jimmy is loyal, sweet, and supportive. He and True are affection towards one another, though hesitate entering a relationship due to Max frowning upon interoffice dating. However, they eventually enter a relationship with his blessing.
- Ron Butler as Oscar, the main secretary for Mad Style. Often seen taking calls on his headset or delivering messages, Oscar is calm and observant, possessing a flamboyant style (frequently wearing ascots) and dry sense of humor, while also offering caring advice.
- Greg Proops as Max Madigan, the founder and CEO of Mad Style. He is an eccentric, good-hearted man who has a propensity for childlike behavior at times. Nonetheless, he can also be a very wise and supportive father figure, especially to True when she feels discouraged.

=== Recurring ===
- Dan Kopelman as Kopelman, a mute Mad Style executive frequently belittled, ridiculed, or humiliated by Max (or sometimes others) before being rudely dismissed.
- Trevor Brown as Mikey J, Lulu's quiet and passive boyfriend.
- Jordan Monaghan as Kelsey, Ryan's aloof and dramatic "girlfriend."
- Melanie Paxson as Doris Madigan (née Aidem), Max Madigan's capricious wife and True's school librarian.
- Taylor Parks as Shelly, one of True's friends.
- Dana Silver as Dana, one of True's friends.
- Joy Osmanski as Ms. Patti Park, True's sardonic History and homeroom teacher.
- Vincent Ventresca as Mr. Jeff Jamerson, True's geeky science teacher.
- Jo-Anne Krupa as Ella, the Mad Style accountant.
- Michael Weaver as Brock Champion, Amanda's fiancé who plays baseball in Peru.

=== Notable Guest Stars ===
- Pamela Adlon as Babs, an adult returning to finish high school that Lulu mentors.
- Dave Allen as Mitchell, copy room operator. (Note: Appeared in two episodes in the series.)
- Craig Anton as Snackleberry Junction chef
- Tim Bagley as Ed Wheeler, True's driving instructor
- Natasha Bedingfield as herself
- Justin Bieber as himself
- Jordan Black as Troy, True's unlucky uncle.
- Samantha Boscarino as Carla Gustav
- Julie Bowen as Claire Underwood, an unlikeable assistant of Amanda’s
- Laura Ashley Samuels as Bijou Stinkbottom
- Yvette Nicole Brown as Coral Barns, one of Amanda's assistants.
- Care Bears on Fire as themselves
- John Cena as himself
- Noah Crawford as Stan, a teen who works at "All Things Lemon."
- Allie DeBerry as Cammy, Pinky's friend.
- Fefe Dobson as herself
- Julia Duffy as Ms. Watson
- Stephen Dunham as Chad Brackett, Amanda's smarmy ex-boyfriend.
- Tiffany Espensen as Young Lulu
- Kevin Farley as Officer Jake Hooley (Note: Appeared in three episodes in the series.)
- Dave Foley as Ted Begley, Jr., company retreat mediator.
- Vivica A. Fox as Mrs. Jackson, True's mother.
- Gage Golightly as Vanessa, a runaway disguised as a flight attendant
- Ian Gomez as Jobi Castanueva, the director of Fashion week
- Kelli Goss as Monique
- Sean Gunn as Justin, a computer maintenance man
- Philip Baker Hall as Mr. Jenkins, chairman of Galaxy Airlines.
- Rachael Harris as Kitty Monreaux, a scathing red carpet reporter
- David Anthony Higgins as Dave, one of Amanda's assistants
- Victoria Justice as Vivian, a model whom Jimmy briefly dates.
- Richard Karn as Fire Marshal O'Dannon
- Tom Kenny as Bingo, owner of Snackleberry Junction.
- Nathan Kress as Prince Gabriel
- Emma Lockhart as Callie, a girl True hires to run a Mad Style store.
- Wendie Malick as Libby Gibbils, Max's fellow fashion colleague.
- J. P. Manoux as Snackleberry Junction waiter
- Laura Marano as Molly, a high school freshman whom True mentors.
- Tristin Mays as Hailey, a cheerleader who kicks Kelsey out of the squad but befriends Ryan.
- Jennette McCurdy as Amanda "Pinky" Turzo, a bully at True's school who wears roller skates.
- Cymphonique Miller as Bernie, Ryan's rival magician.
- Oliver Muirhead as Ian, Prince Gabriel's butler.
- Arden Myrin as Jenna Lutrell, a popular but ditzy TV actress.
- Suzy Nakamura as Cricket, True's former assistant.
- Gail O'Grady as Sophie Girard, Max's very mean ex-girlfriend.
- Nick Palatas as Skeet
- Janel Parrish as Kyla
- Kelly Perine as Larry Jackson, True's father.
- Jack Plotnick as Mr. LaRue, Doris and Max's short-tempered wedding planner.
- Nathalia Ramos as Dakota North, a spoiled supermodel.
- Italia Ricci as herself, playing a character in a fictional John Cena film.
- Andy Richter as Simon Christini, Max's fashion nemesis.
- Raini Rodriguez as Nina
- Travis Schuldt as Lance Whipple, a hunky assistant librarian whom Max becomes jealous of.
- Kent Shocknek as himself
- Ryan Sheckler as himself
- Willow Smith as Young True
- Stefán Karl Stefánsson as Karl Gustav
- French Stewart as Donald the Delightful, Max's magic assistant turned rival.
- James Patrick Stuart as Burt Burlington, a television personality who embarrassed Max on television.
- Nicole Sullivan as Kreuftlva, a fortune teller.
- Sharon Tay as herself
- Leon Thomas III as himself
- Bobb'e J. Thompson as Nate, a high school freshman whom Ryan mentors.
- Stephen Tobolowsky as Lars Balthazar, a famous cellist whom Max likes.
- Paul F. Tompkins as Royce Bingham, an international spy.
- Julie Warner as Rose Pinchbinder, Mad Style's fear-inducing accountant.
- Tyler James Williams as Justin Webber, a famous rapper whom True develops a crush on.
- Tom Wilson as Benjamin Franklin
- The cast of Yo Gabba Gabba!

== Humor ==
True Jackson, VP has drawn positive reviews for its unique building of humor in comparison to other Nickelodeon and Disney Channel series. Much of this humor comes from running gags in a fashion similar to the CBS sitcom The Nanny.

A constant source of humor is from catchphrases and/or responses, especially if its eccentric or odd. One example is Palmer's delivery of the catchphrase of "(you/she/he) (I/said/did) (there was) what now?" that is said by Jackson when stunned by bad news from another character. Another is a character - mostly True - making a positive comment, only to be interrupted by Amanda angrily screaming "Where's (person)?" in relation to the comment, sometimes followed by her confronting and admonishing the person over something irritating her.

Another is patterned behaviors of characters. The most notable running gag in the series is Madigan's belittlement of finance employee Kopelman, usually ending with Madigan dismissing him from the meeting by screaming "Kopelman, OUT!" and pointing out the door. Another major running gag is Ryan's relationship with Kelsey, whom he worships despite her seeming lack of interest and outright rejection of him. Ryan will usually mention he plans to, or something interferes with, plans he has with Kelsey, and either True or Lulu will correct him saying Kelsey is not his girlfriend, or make a sarcastic comment such as "does Kelsey know?" Other major themes are behaviors or actions that sound hyperbolic, but later demonstrated to not be. One example is the turnover rate of Amanda's assistants, which is mentioned to be every day, or every few minutes, often for a nugatory reason. For example, in the episode "ReTRUEnion," True talks on the phone with Amanda's new assistant Erica, even though True saw her previous assistant Mindy ten minutes prior (with Erica starting "nine minutes ago").

== Production ==
The series was shot on stage 25 at Paramount Studios in Hollywood, California. This is the same stage where series The Lucy Show, Here's Lucy, Cheers, and Frasier were shot.

== Filming locations ==
- The outdoor shots of Mad Style's fashion company and office took place around 1251 Avenue of the Americas (Exxon Building) in New York.
- The location of the school is on the premises of the Paramount Studios. Indoors were shot in the studio, and the school's outdoor shot was shot on the premises of Paramount Studios.
- In episode four of season 2, True goes to see a fortune teller with Lulu and Ryan. The indoor recordings were recorded in the studio. The outdoor shot was shot at 178 Prince Street in New York.

=== Gallery ===
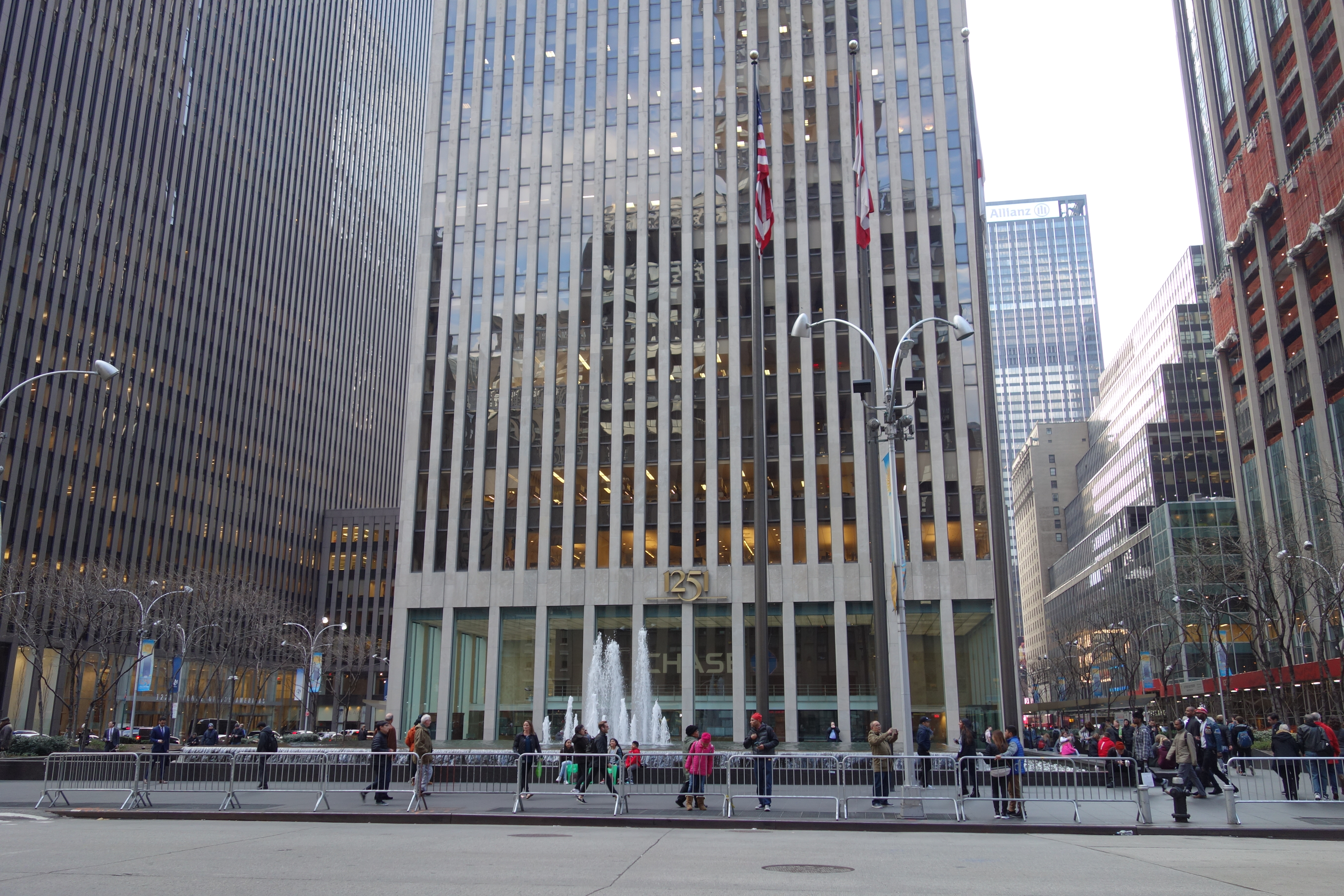
Filming location, Mad Style's New York fashion company and office, actually 1251 Avenue of the Americas

== Broadcast ==
The series has aired on-and-off on TeenNick in the United States since 2008, with the most recent airing in 2023. BET also briefly aired episodes of the series in 2009. On May 1, 2019, the series began airing on Nick Pluto.

The show also premiered on the Canadian network YTV on March 5, 2009, and every Thursday since, but was changed to Friday to accommodate with iCarly & Big Fun Fridays. Then, the show moved again to Mondays at 6:30pm. As of 2010, the series no longer airs on YTV.

The series continues to air regularly on Nickelodeon networks around the world. The show ended in Australia and New Zealand on 17 December 2011. The last two remaining episodes premiered in the UK on Wednesday 4 January 2012 and Thursday 5 January 2012 and with "Mystery in Peru" premiering on Friday 6 January 2012.

The series was shown in Jamaica on one of the national stations TVJ (Television Jamaica) at 4:30pm on Tuesdays and Wednesdays.

In Italy, the series began airing on the Super! Girl Power Pluto TV channel on January 18, 2023, and it was previously aired on Nickelodeon, Italia 1 and VH1 in that country. It's now occasionally watchable on the Super! Pop Pluto TV channel, along with Drake & Josh.

== Home media ==
True Jackson, VP: Season 1, Vol. 1 was released in a 2 disc set on September 8, 2009. Running time is 321 minutes, presented in full screen video, and English stereo audio. The set also includes behind-the-scenes, cast member's screen tests, bloopers and the first 13 episodes of season 1. A second volume of the first season was never released.

The following releases were only released on Amazon.com's CreateSpace manufacture-on-demand (MOD) service:

- True Jackson, VP: Season 2 was released on September 9, 2011. Running time is 468 minutes, presented in full screen video, and English Stereo audio. This DVD release has 20 episodes from the second season.
- True Jackson, VP: Season 3 was released on September 9, 2011. Running time is 327 minutes, presented in full screen video, and English Stereo audio. This DVD release has 14 episodes from the third season.

On March 24, 2021, the series was added to Paramount+.

== Awards and nominations ==
Year	Award	Category	Recipient	Result
2009	NAACP Image Award	Outstanding Children's Program	True Jackson, VP	Nominated
2009	NAACP Image Award	Outstanding Performance in a Youth/Children's Program - (Series or Special)	Keke Palmer	Won
2009	Casting Society of America	Outstanding Achievement in Casting - Children's Series Programming	Krisha Bullock & Harriet Greenspan	Nominated
2009	Gracie Allen Award	Outstanding Adolescent Program	True Jackson, VP	Won
2010	NAACP Image Award	Outstanding Children's Program	True Jackson, VP	Nominated
2010	NAACP Image Award	Outstanding Performance in a Youth/Children's Program - (Series or Special)	Keke Palmer	Won
2010	Casting Society of America	Outstanding Achievement in Casting - Children's Series Programming	Harriet Greenspan	Won
2010	2010 Kids' Choice Awards	Favorite TV Actress	Keke Palmer	Nominated
2010	Writers Guild of America	Children's Episodic & Specials, For the episode The Rival	Dan Kopelman	Nominated
2011	NAACP Image Award	Outstanding Children's Program	True Jackson, VP	Won
2011	NAACP Image Award	Outstanding Performance in a Youth/Children's Program - (Series or Special)	Keke Palmer	Won
2011	Casting Society of America	Outstanding Achievement in Casting - Children's Series Programming	Harriet Greenspan	Nominated
2011	UK 2011 Kids' Choice Awards	Nick UK's Funniest Person	Matt Shively	Nominated
2011	Young Artist Awards	Best Performance In A TV Series (Comedy or Drama) - Leading Young Actress	Keke Palmer	Nominated
2011	Young Artist Awards	Best Performance In A TV Series - Recurring Young Actress Ten and Under	Ava Allan	Nominated
2011	Writers Guild of America	Children's Episodic & Specials, For the episode True Magic	Andy Gordon	Nominated
2012	NAACP Image Award	Outstanding Performance in a Youth/Children's Program - (Series or Special)	Keke Palmer	Won
2012	Young Artist Awards	Best Performance In A TV Series - Recurring Young Actress	Ava Allan	Nominated

== Merchandise and in other media ==
=== Clothing line ===
In August 2009, a line of clothing inspired by the show called "Mad Style by True Jackson" was released. The line was available exclusively at Walmart and is aimed at children and teens. This was the first line of clothing for the show and was a first for Nickelodeon releasing a line of clothing from one of their television shows. Commercials advertising the clothing line could be seen on Nickelodeon and TeenNick. Featured in the show and commercials is an instrumental version of the show's theme song.

=== Book series ===
A set of novels based on the show were released, via Amazon.
