= I Stole Your Animal =

Studio album by Care Bears on Fire
- Released: October 4, 2007
- Genre: Rock; pop-punk
- Length: 29:11
- Label: Daisy Explosion
- Producer: Joel Hamilton

I Stole Your Animal is the first full-length album by Care Bears on Fire. It was released October 4, 2007, on Daisy Explosion Records. The band was in middle school when the album was released.

== Critical reception ==
PopMatters called the album "cheerful garage pop-punk," writing that it was "not entirely without charm." SFGate called it "rough-around-the-edges, early-style American punk." The Austin Chronicle wrote that Care Bears on Fire "shred precociously on smart, snappy songs like 'Met You on MySpace.'"

== Track listing ==
All tracks were written by Care Bears on Fire.

No.	Title	Writer(s)	Length
1.	"Everybody Else"	Isadora Schappell and Sophie Kasakove	2:07
2.	"Five-Minute Boyfriend"	Sophie Kasakove	2:36
3.	"Met You On MySpace"	Isadora Schappell	2:26
4.	"Shadow Girl"	Sophie Kasakove	2:54
5.	"Jack Brown"	Sophie Kasakove	3:53
6.	"I Must Know Why"	Isadora Schappell, Sophie Kasakove, Lucio Westmoreland	2:54
7.	"Victim of Rock & Roll"	Sophie Kasakove	1:55
8.	"8"	Sophie Kasakove and Isadora Schappell	2:46
9.	"Watchdog"	Sophie Kasakove	2:54
10.	"You Walk Away"	Sophie Kasakove	3:07
11.	"Baby Animals"	Isadora Schappell, Sophie Kasakove, Lucio Westmoreland	1:30
Total length:			29:11
