= Brent Carpenter =

- Occupation(s): Television cinematographer, director, editor and producer
- Years active: 1976, 1988–present

Brent Carpenter is an American television director, editor, cinematographer and producer.

== Career ==
As an editor he worked on the television series Empty Nest, The Ben Stiller Show, Whose Line Is It Anyway?, Sessions and working on number of stand-up comedy specials starring Jay Leno, Sam Kinison, Rodney Dangerfield, Kathy Griffin, Paula Poundstone and Kevin Nealon.

His directing credits include sitcoms The Larry Sanders Show, Caroline in the City, Greg the Bunny, Oliver Beene, True Jackson, VP, Crash & Bernstein. He's directed a number of live television specials which include all of the Ringo Starr and His All-Starr Band tours since 2003, a number of Comedy Central specials, The Grammy Pre Telecast and several PBS music specials. In 1976, he appeared as an extra in the film A Star Is Born before pursuing a behind the camera career.

In 1997, Carpenter received a Grammy nomination as producer and Primetime Emmy nomination for editing the Great Performances episode "Robert Altman's Jazz '34" nominated with Dylan Tichenor. As well as directing music videos for Ringo Starr, Aerosmith, Ozzy Osbourne, Emmylou Harris, Neil Young and Cledus T. Judd.
