= Care Bears on Fire =

American band

- Care Bears on Fire (pictured left to right: Izzy, Jena, Sophie)

Background information
- Origin: Brooklyn, New York, U.S.
- Genres: Pop punk, garage rock, riot grrrl
- Years active: 2005–2012
- Labels: Daisy Explosion, Beautiful, S-Curve
- Past members: Sophie; Izzy; Lucio; LuLu Laurette Prat; Jena; Lyle; August
- Website: MySpace page

Care Bears on Fire was a Brooklyn, New York-based band that consisted of Sophie (vocals and guitar) and Izzy (drums). The group originally formed in 2005 with the singer-guitarist Sophie Kasakove, age 11, bassist-singer Lucio Westmoreland, age 11, guitarist Michael (Lyle) Kokiko, age 11, singer-keyboardist August Rosenthal, age 10, and drummer-singer Isadora “Izzy” Schappell-Spillman, age 10, all classmates at Park Slope's Berkeley Carroll School. Lead guitarist Michael (Lyle) Kokiko and singer-keyboardist August Rosenthal left the band in 2006 due to creative differences. After their bass player, Lucio, departed from the band he was replaced with LuLu and lastly, Jena (who left in 2011). The band labels itself as a pop punk group, mixing in alternative and garage rock elements. The band released their first, full-length LP, I Stole Your Animal on 28 September 2007, at a release party in Brooklyn. Their second album, Get Over It, was released in July 2009 on S-Curve Records.

== History ==
Care Bears on Fire formed in 2005 when Sophie, Lucio and Izzy were in 5th grade. They went through a variety of names before settling on the name Care Bears on Fire "because they liked the idea of mixing something sweet with something edgy".

The band got their break when New York Magazine did a profile on the three in the summer of 2006. After this article was published, Care Bears on Fire shot into the limelight with sources such as Spin Magazine calling Care Bears "...key players in the burgeoning New York kid-core scene..." They released their first EP, Confuse Me on Beautiful Records at a show in 2006.

== I Stole Your Animal era ==
Care Bears on Fire at their record release party on September 28, 2007.

The band formally released their debut LP album, I Stole Your Animal on 2 October 2007. The album received positive reviews from critics, with publications such as Detour stating that "The songs are catchy, with an earnest rhythm section backing up the same big guitar chords the grownup garage-punk bands use," and Anna Creech in Blogcritics Magazine praising the album as "a must-have for modern rock fans."

Sophie is featured on a 2007 Converse ad, playing an acoustic version of their song, "Everybody Else".

== Get Over It! ==
Care Bears on Fire released their second full-length album Get Over It!, on S-Curve Records July 14, 2009. They album included collaborations with Fountains of Wayne's Adam Schlesinger and Travis Clark of We The Kings on a handful of songs. The album also includes a new version of the song "Everybody Else," produced by Steve Greenberg and S*A*M and Sluggo, which was released on iTunes as a single in January 2009. The band played the Bamboozle Festival in Spring 2009. Their song "Everybody Else" was featured as the "coolest song in the world" of the week on Steven Van Zandt's globally syndicated radio show, Little Steven's Underground Garage, that year.

They toured with Nat and Alex Wolff in July/August 2009 and were featured on KidzBop.com's "Artists 2 Know"

== TV guest appearances ==
On November 14, 2009, Care Bears on Fire guest starred on Nickelodeon's TV series True Jackson, VP, which also guest starred Justin Bieber. Their music video, "Everybody Else" has also been shown on Nickelodeon's TeenNick channel.

On an episode of Nickelodeon's Victorious, the band was briefly featured in a scene where the cast is stuck in an RV. When one of the characters is on the floor checking the thermometer, the picture from the cover of the Get Over It album is displayed.

On August 26, 2009, the band appeared on the Late Show with David Letterman.

They also had a long stint on the music section of "Channel One News".

They also appeared on the YouTube Channel "Smart Girls" and were interviewed by Amy Poehler.

Their cover of the Tears for Fears song "Everybody Wants to Rule the World" appeared in the closing credits song for the True Blood episode of the same name in addition to the 2017 back to school commercial for Macy's.

== Discography ==
- Confuse Me EP (2006)
- I Stole Your Animal (Daisy Explosion, 2007)
- Get Over It! (S-Curve, 2009)
- Girls Like It Loud EP (S-Curve, 2010)
