= Dan Kopelman =

American actor

- Other names: Kopelman
- Occupation(s): Television producer, television writer, actor
- Years active: 1998–present

Dan Kopelman is an American television producer, television writer and actor. He has written and produced for Undressed, Big Wolf on Campus, Malcolm in the Middle, Big Day, Listen Up, Rules of Engagement and Notes from the Underbelly. Kopelman is perhaps best known for his work on the Nickelodeon sitcom, True Jackson, VP, writing and producing for the series and appearing as a parody of himself being credited simply as "Kopelman".
