= Ron Butler =

American actor

- Born: Ronald Butler Jr. Bahamas
- Other name: Ronnie Butler
- Occupations: Actor, director, comedian
- Years active: 1991–present

Ronald Butler Jr. is a Bahamian-born American television actor, director and comedian who is best known for portraying Oscar, the clever receptionist, on the Nickelodeon television series True Jackson, VP, from 2008 to 2011. He often portrays former President Barack Obama in comedy sketches. He has performed with the Atlantic Theater Company for over 20 years.

== Early life ==
Butler is originally from the Bahamas. He is named after his father Ronnie Butler, Sr., a calypso singer, songwriter, and recording artist. As a child, Butler sometimes performed with his father. Butler grew up partly in the United States (Washington, D.C., Virginia, and the suburbs of Syracuse, New York) and partly in the Bahamas. He attended high school in the Bahamas and graduated magna cum laude from Trinity International University near Chicago, Illinois, receiving a B.A. in History and Economics in 1985.

Butler worked as an economic consultant for a law firm based in Washington, D.C., before beginning his acting career. While in Washington, Butler studied acting privately with Vera Katz of Howard University and performed in regional theatre around Washington. Later, he studied with David Mamet, William H. Macy, Felicity Huffman, Scott Zigler and Robert Bella of the Atlantic Theater Company.

== Career ==
Butler became a member of the Off-Broadway Atlantic Theater Company in New York City in 1991, the same year that he appeared in the film Homicide. With Atlantic, he has performed in, among other works, Once in a Lifetime. Among other Off-Broadway and regional theatre roles, he played Bunker and other roles in a revival of Merrily We Roll Along (and on the cast recording) with the York Theatre Company in 1994. He then sang in a swing band, The Solicitors, in Europe for some years. In 2007, he played Henry in the concert production of South Pacific at the Hollywood Bowl with Reba McEntire and Brian Stokes Mitchell.

He appeared in the 2004 HBO film Everyday People, as Ron Harding, for which he won an IFP Award for Best Breakout Performance. He also appeared in the films Smother (2007) and Rain (2008). He played Oscar, the clever receptionist for Mad Style, on the television series True Jackson, VP, from 2008 to 2011. He was in the Hollywood Bowl production of South Pacific. He plays Vice Principal Lewis on the web series First Day. He has guest-starred in such TV shows as Without a Trace, Crossing Jordan, Boston Legal, How I Met Your Mother, Scrubs, Ugly Betty, Medium, Dirty Sexy Money and in the first episode of the fourth series of Torchwood entitled "The New World".

Butler also writes and performs sketch comedies. President Barack Obama is one of his most noted characters. In October 2010, he released a YouTube video, as Obama, singing a pastiche of the "Major-General's Song" that affectionately lampooned the President. The video was widely distributed on the internet.

== Television and film appearances ==
Show	Role	Year
Homicide	Rookie	1991
Everyday People	Ron Harding	2004
Spartan	Headquarters Agent	2004
Boston Legal	Dr. Kohler	2005
Summerland	Doctor	2005 / 2010
Invasion	Coroner, Asst. Coroner Arvin Morton (2 episodes)	2005
Related	Front desk clerk (Episode: "Sisters are Forever")	2006
Ugly Betty	Reporter #2 (Episode: Queens for a Day)	2006
Without a Trace	Mr. Roberts	2006
Crossing Jordan	Attorney, lawyer (2 episodes)	2006–2007
Nurses	Clerk	2007
Medium	Desk Clerk (Episode: "Head Games")	2007
How I Met Your Mother	Proctor (Episode: Spoiler Alert)	2007
Smother	Friendly Man	2007
Eli Stone	Jury Foreman	2008
Rain	The Preacher	2008
Dirty Sexy Money	Severin (Episode: "The Silence")	2008
Terminator: The Sarah Connor Chronicles	Social Worker (Episode: "The Demon Hand")	2008
True Jackson, VP	Oscar (46 episodes)	2008 - 2011
Torchwood: Miracle Day	Senior Professor (1st episode)	2011
Dog with a Blog	Commercial Director (Episode: "Dog with a Hog")	2012
Parenthood	Council Secretary (Episode: "Trouble in Candyland")	2012
Grey's Anatomy	Jordan Shouse (Episode: "Things We Said Today")	2013
Bunheads	Eric Sinclair (3 episodes)	2012 - 2013
Shameless	Advisor (Episode: "Civil Wrongs")	2013
It's Always Sunny in Philadelphia	Scientist (Episode: "Mac Day")	2013
Old Dogs & New Tricks	Barack Obama (Episode: "WeHo Horror Story")	2014
The Hungover Games	President Snowbama	2014

=== Narrations ===
Year	Title	Author
2015	Til the Well Runs Dry	Laura Francis-Sharma
2015	Notes of a Native Son	James Baldwin
2015	Grant Park	Leonard Pitts
2016	Who Was Roberto Clemente?	James Buckley, Jr.
2019	The Black Jacobins	C. L. R. James
2019	On Time: A Princely Life in Funk	Morris Day and David Ritz
2021	The Half Has Never Been Told: Slavery and the Making of American Capitalism	Edward E Baptist

=== Web ===
Year	Title	Role	Notes
2011	First Day 2: First Dance	Vice Principal Lewis	6 episodes
