= Danielle Bisutti =

American actress and singer

- Born: Danielle Nicole Bisutti; October 1, 1976 (age 50); Simi Valley, California, U.S.
- Education: California State University, Fullerton (BA)
- Occupations: Actress; singer-songwriter; writer; producer
- Years active: 1997–present
- Relatives: Cristina Ferrare (aunt)

Danielle Nicole Bisutti (born October 1, 1976) is an American actress and singer. She is best known for her roles as Amanda Cantwell on the Nickelodeon television series True Jackson, VP and the Norse goddess Freya in the 2018 video game, God of War, for which she received a British Academy Games Award for Performer nomination, and its 2022 sequel, God of War Ragnarök, for which she was nominated for the British Academy Games Award for Performer in a Supporting Role.

== Early life ==
Bisutti was born and raised in Los Angeles, California, the daughter of Diana (née Ferrare) and Richard Bisutti. Her father was a set decorator in both film and television for 20 years. Her maternal aunt is model Cristina Ferrare. Bisutti is of Italian descent. Bisutti attended California State University, Fullerton, where she received a BA in Acting and Musical Theatre.

== Acting career ==
While attending university, Bisutti was nominated several times for Best Actress in the Irene Ryan Competition and took the runner-up position at The Lincoln Center Theatre in New York City. Michael Butler noticed Bisutti in the role of Sheila in a California production of Hair and brought the cast to Chicago to perform at the Democratic National Convention along with a five-week run at The New Athenaeum Theatre. Bisutti's other theatre credits include Reno Sweeney in Anything Goes, Maggie in Boy's Life, Yelena in Uncle Vanya, Victoria/Jane in Noël Coward’s Tonight at 8.30, Fastrada in Pippin, and Ophelia in Hamlet.

Bisutti has performed in television over the years, recurring on Last Man Standing, Parks & Recreation, CSI: Miami, Without a Trace, Raising the Bar and The O.C., while also appearing on NCIS, Criminal Minds, Castle, Hot in Cleveland, 90210, Private Practice, Body of Proof, Bones, Cold Case, Two and a Half Men and Boston Legal. She may best known for her starring role as Amanda Cantwell opposite Keke Palmer on the Nickelodeon series True Jackson, VP from 2008 to 2011.

She played Michelle, the abusive mother of Parker Crane, in Insidious 2.

Some of her film credits include Venice Underground, The Neighbor, and No Greater Love. Bisutti co-produced the webseries Hollywood Girl and recurred on the series as Pasha Maneer. She had a leading role in Harland Williams's post-apocalyptic sci-fi webseries The Australian, which was released in late November 2013.

In 2018, Bisutti provided the voice and motion capture for the Witch of the Woods, who is later revealed to be the goddess Freya, in God of War. She received praise for her work and was nominated for the BAFTA Award for Best Performance in a Video Game at the 15th British Academy Games Awards but lost to her co-star Jeremy Davies.

In 2022, Bisutti provided the voice of Elsa from the 2013 Disney animated feature film Frozen while Idina Menzel was unavailable in Disney Dreamlight Valley.

== Singing career ==
Songs originally written by Bisutti, such as "Venice Underground", "April Moon", and "In the Presence of", have been used in independent feature films. At the 2003 Los Angeles Music Awards, she won the award for "Best Female Singer-Songwriter". Also at this ceremony, her song "Glimmer" was nominated for "AAA Album of the Year," and her song "In Passing" received the Unanimous Choice Recipient Award for "Independent AC Single of the Year". In September 2004, Bisutti performed at the Temecula Valley International Film & Music Festival, where "In Passing" was selected for the TVIFF's "Top Musical Artist Compilation CD" and Music Connection Magazine featured Bisutti in its 2004 "Hot 100 Unsigned Artists" list.

== Filmography ==
=== Film ===
Year	Title	Role	Notes
2001	Automatic	Morgan Black	
2001	Survivor: Los Angeles the Ultimate Parody	Taylor	Short film
2004	Tropix	Corrine Findlay	
2004	Seeing Iris	Iris Jones	Short film
2005	Venice Underground	Wexler's Secretary	
2005	Downsizing	Beatrix Schnabel	Short film
2007	The Neighbor	Floria Riamondi	
2008	Three Minutes in Heaven	Joy	Short film
2008	Get Smart	Airline Passenger	
2008	The Caretaker	Jessica	Short film
2010	No Greater Love	Heather Stroud	
2013	Curse of Chucky	Barb Pierce	
2013	Insidious: Chapter 2	Mother of Parker Crane	
2014	Back in the Day	Annette Taylor	
2018	The Feminine Mystaque	Betty Hopescotch	
2019	Hipster Sweatshop	Diane	Short film
2019	Greenlight	Mrs. Adams	
2021	Little May	Elizabeth Ackerman	Short film
2023	The Blue Rose	Norma Steele	
2025	Echo Hunter	Sloane	Short film
2025	Lego Disney Frozen: Operation Puffins	Elsa	Disney+

=== Television ===
Year	Title	Role	Notes
2000	Strip Mall	Dani	Episode: "Pilot"
2001	Dharma & Greg	Joy	Episode: "Dharma Does Dallas"
2003	Miss Match	Missy	Episode: "Miss Communication"
2003	Platonically Incorrect	Waitress	TV film
2003	Andy Richter Controls the Universe	Jane	Episodes: "Final Fantasy", "Duh Dog"
2003	Less than Perfect	Sales Lady	Episode: "High Maintenance"
2003	Charlie Lawrence	Denise	Episode: "If It's Not One Thing It's Your Mother"
2003	Charmed	The Lady of the Lake	Episode: "Sword and the City"
2004	Boston Legal	Roberta Sloane	Episode: "Truth Be Told"
2004–05	The O.C.	Joan	Recurring role (5 episodes)
2006	Twenty Good Years	Courtney	Episode: "John's Old Lady"
2006	Courting Alex	Veronica	Episode: "The Fix-Up"
2006	Two and a Half Men	Vicki	Episode: "Corey's Been Dead for an Hour"
2007	Shark	Francis Chambers	Episode: "Blind Trust"
2007	Cold Case	Mrs. Valentine (1953)	Episode: "Devil Music"
2007–08	Without a Trace	Terri Long	Episodes: "The Beginning", "4G", "Deja Vu"
2008	Wizards of Waverly Place	Mona Lisa	Episode: "Art Museum Piece"
2008	Raising the Bar	Emma Troutman	Episode: "Shop Till You Drop"
2008–11	True Jackson, VP	Amanda Cantwell	Series regular; 56 episodes
2009	Raising the Bar	Emma Troutman	Episodes: "Hair Apparent", "Trout Fishing"
2010	ACME Saturday Night	Guest Host	Season 2: Episode: 26
2010	Bones	Marlowe Becker	Episode: "The Mastodon in the Room"
2011	Hollywood Girl	Pascha Maneer	Episodes: "Code Red Carpet", "Limp of Shame"
2011	Body of Proof	Vicki Hemington	Episode: "Love Thy Neighbor"
2011	Private Practice	Lynn	Episode: "Deal with It"
2011	CSI: Miami	Gabrielle Wade	Episode: "Dead Ringer"
2011–12	Parks and Recreation	Prof. Linda Lonegan	2 episodes: "Smallest Park" "Lucky"
2012	90210	Connie	Episode: "No Good Deed"
2012	Hot in Cleveland	Verena	Episode: "I'm with the Band"
2012	Last Man Standing	Michelle	Episodes: "Odd Couple Out", "Adrenaline"
2012	CSI: Miami	Gabrielle Wade	Episodes: "Rest in Pieces", "Law & Disorder"
2012	Castle	Claire Panchard	Episode: "The Limey"
2012	Leverage	Wendy Baran	Episode: "The Gimme a K Street Job"
2012	Criminal Minds	Debra Acklin	Episode: "Through the Looking Glass"
2012	NCIS	SSSA Ashley Winter	Episode: "You Better Watch Out"
2013	CSI: Crime Scene Investigation	Theresa Shea	Episode: "Dead Air"
2013	Grey's Anatomy	Liz Langer	Episode: "Hard Bargain"
2013	Anger Management	Kristy	Episode: "Charlie Dates a Teacher"
2014	Beauty and the Beast	April Harris	Episode: Ever After
2014	Matador	Meredith Wright	Episode: Riot Til I Die & Mala Sangre
2014	Happyland	Margot Chandler	Episode: Leave of Abscene & Your Happyland Family
2015	I Didn't Do It	Mrs. Clegg	Guest role
2015	NCIS: Los Angeles	Atty. Sarah Taylor	Episode: "Blame It On Rio"
2015	The Newsreader	Wendy Garson-Gray	Episode: The Creepish Man Alive; Bomb Sniffing Dogs
2015	Rizzoli & Isles	Linda Wallace	Episode: Family Matters
2015	Faking It	Clement University Counselor	Episode: Future Tense
2016	Dr. Ken	Denise	Episode: "Ken at the Concert"
2016	Still Single	Sage Callaghan	TV film
2017	Mom	Dana	Episode: Fancy Crackers and Giant Women
2018	Nanny Killer	Ms. Grey	TV film
2018	For the People	Dana Gallagher	Episode: This Is What I Wanted To Say
2019–21	Dwight in Shining Armor	Witch Hexela	Series Regular
2021	Mother F*cker!	Bizzy	Episode: "Boom Boom"

=== Podcast series ===
List of voice performances in podcast
Year	Title	Role(s)	Notes
2024	The South Jersey Horror Podcast	Danielle	S4. Episode: 44

=== Video games ===
Year	Title	Role	Notes
2018	God of War	The Witch of the Woods / Freya / Frigg	Nominated - BAFTA Award for Performer
2019	The Lego Movie 2 Videogame	Wonder Woman	
2020	Madden NFL 21	Claudia Grimstone	
2020	Madden NFL 21: Face of the Franchise: Rise to Fame	Claudia Grimstone	
2022	God of War Ragnarök	The Witch of the Woods / Freya / Frigg	Nominated - BAFTA Award for Performer in a Supporting Role
2022	Disney Dreamlight Valley	Elsa	
2023	Redfall	Vampire	
2023	Star Wars Jedi: Survivor	Tulli Mu	
2023	God of War Ragnarök: Valhalla	The Witch of the Woods / Freya / Frigg	
2023	Disney Speedstorm	Elsa	

== Awards and nominations ==
Year	Award	Category	Nominated Work	Result	Ref.
2002	Daytime Emmy Awards	Best Host	Street Music Los Angeles	Won	
2003	LA Music Awards	Film Track Score	In the Presence of	Won	
2003	LA Music Awards	Best Female Singer-Songwriter	Venice Underground & April Moon	Won	
2003	LA Music Awards	AAA Album of the Year	Glimmer	Nominated	
2003	LA Music Awards	Unanimous Choice Recipient Awards	In Passing	Won	
2003	LA Music Awards	Independent AC Single of the Year	April Moon	Won	
2019	15th British Academy Games Awards	Best Performer	God of War	Nominated	
2019	Fade In Awards	Short Script Competition	Little May	Won	
2023	19th British Academy Games Awards	Performer in a Supporting Role	God of War Ragnarök	Nominated	
