= 3rd Rock from the Sun season 3 =

3rd Rock from the Sun
- Season 3
- DVD cover
- No. of episodes: 27

Release
- Original network: NBC
- Original release: September 24, 1997 – May 20, 1998

Season chronology
- ← Previous; Season 2 Next → Season 4

The third season of 3rd Rock from the Sun, an American television series, began September 24, 1997, and ended on May 20, 1998. It aired on NBC. The region 1 DVD was released on February 21, 2006.

== Cast and characters ==
=== Main cast ===
- John Lithgow as Dick Solomon
- Kristen Johnston as Sally Solomon
- French Stewart as Harry Solomon
- Joseph Gordon-Levitt as Tommy Solomon
- Jane Curtin as Dr. Mary Albright
- Simbi Khali as Nina Campbell
- Elmarie Wendel as Mrs. Mamie Dubcek
- Wayne Knight as Officer Don Leslie Orville

=== Recurring cast ===
- David DeLuise as Bug Pollone
- Ian Lithgow as Leon
- Danielle Nicolet as Caryn
- Chris Hogan as Aubrey Pitman
- Ileen Getz as Dr. Judith Draper
- Shay Astar as August Leffler
- Jan Hooks as Vicki Dubcek
- Ron West as Dr. Vincent Strudwick
- John Cleese as Dr. Liam Neesam

== Episodes ==
No. overall	No. in season	Title	Directed by	Written by	Original release date	Prod. code	Viewers (millions)
47	1	"Fun with Dick and Janet: Part 1"	Terry Hughes	Mark Brazill & Bob Kushell	September 24, 1997	301	16.37
Harry, Sally and Tommy return to Earth, but are forced to bring along the Big Giant Head's niece (Roseanne Barr), who is assigned to act as Dick's wife in order to keep his focus on the mission and off Mary. To make matters worse, the police suspect that aliens might have landed in Rutherford and have sent Officer Don to investigate.
48	2	"Fun with Dick and Janet: Part 2"	Terry Hughes	Mark Brazill & Bob Kushell	September 24, 1997	302	16.37
Dick comes up with a plan to get his new wife to leave him - by turning himself into the worst possible husband anyone could have. This does not work, and despite all his attempts to keep his wife secret, Mary soon finds out and breaks up with him, furious. (Absent: Elmarie Wendel as Mrs. Dubcek)
49	3	"Tricky Dick"	Terry Hughes	Bill Martin & Mike Schiff	October 8, 1997	305	11.94
Still bitter after their break-up, Dick and Mary begin a childish prank war against each other to try to prove, ironically, who is the biggest adult in the office. Sally attends yoga classes with Mary, where she begins to take a liking to her instructor (Leigh McCloskey). At home, Tommy and his friends have formed a garage band and are practicing in the garage, while Harry wants desperately to be their roadie.
50	4	"Dick-in-Law"	Terry Hughes	Christine Zander	October 15, 1997	304	9.83
Mary is unable to tell her bitter, condescending parents (Elaine Stritch and George Grizzard) that another relationship has fallen through, and so invites Dick to meet her parents under the pretense that they are still to be married. Dick is quick to accompany her, thinking that if he can win her parents' hearts, he might win back Mary's. In Rutherford, Sally, Harry, and Tommy help Nina move out of her apartment, before Sally decides that she would like to move in.
51	5	"Scaredy Dick"	Terry Hughes	David Sacks	October 29, 1997	306	14.92
Dick goes for a medical checkup but becomes scared and leaves before his appointment. Mary asks Sally and Tommy to house sit for her on Halloween in order to stop trick-or-treaters (including Emile Hirsch) egging her home while she is out. Harry, however, chooses to stay at home, where he encounters some very strange noises and starts to believe that there is a ghost in the house.
52	6	"Moby Dick"	Terry Hughes	Michael Glouberman & Andrew Orenstein	November 5, 1997	303	13.15
When Dick discovers that he has put on a large amount of weight, Nina tells him that it is because he is sad about his breakup with Mary. Dick tries to slim by eating healthily and attending exercise classes, but nothing works and he ends up joining a weight loss group, where he runs into Mary. Sally begins to grow attached to her new tomato plant and names it Jeremy, leading Don to fear the worst when he hears that Sally is spending much time with "him." Tommy is worried that August is cheating on him and sends Harry to investigate. (Absent: Elmarie Wendel as Mrs. Dubcek)
53	7	"Eleven Angry Men and One Dick"	Terry Hughes	David Goetsch & Jason Venokur	November 12, 1997	307	13.95
Dick is called up for jury duty for the first time and struggles to deliver a guilty verdict on a clearly guilty man. Sally, much to Officer Don's distress, falls for a cockney 'artist' called Seth, and makes herself over to look and sound similar to him. Harry and Tommy volunteer themselves for Mary's class project - they must communicate without words for five days. (Absent: Elmarie Wendel as Mrs. Dubcek)
54	8	"A Friend in Dick"	Terry Hughes	Gregg Mettler	November 19, 1997	308	13.05
Dick has two theater tickets for Peter Connolly's 'King of the Jig' left over from when he and Mary were dating, but upon realizing that he does not have any friends to accompany him, he forges a friendship with Don and becomes jealous when Don wants to spend time with his other friends. Meanwhile, Sally's 'artist' boyfriend Seth voices his dislike of Connolly and Sally decides to lure him to Johnny Foam's. Tommy forces Harry to go to night school to earn a diploma, so that he can have the things that his friends do. (Absent: Elmarie Wendel as Mrs. Dubcek)
55	9	"Seven Deadly Clips"	Terry Hughes	Michael Glouberman & Andrew Orenstein	December 3, 1997	327	10.56
Clip show in which the Solomons review how some of their past experiences on Earth have involved the Seven Deadly Sins. (Absent: Elmarie Wendel as Mrs. Dubcek)
56	10	"Tom, Dick and Mary"	Terry Hughes	Terry Turner	December 3, 1997	309	11.62
Tommy decides that he needs to find a woman who is closer to his real age, and pursues Mary, kicking up a fierce rivalry between himself and Dick. Sally finally gets a proper job, but her boss begins to sexually harass her, and she is fired. Harry is under orders not to watch any TV for a week, since Dick thinks he is watching too much of it.
57	11	"Jailhouse Dick"	Terry Hughes	David M. Israel & Jim O'Doherty	December 17, 1997	310	10.79
Dick takes care of former felon Eddie in the hope of rehabilitating him, but soon tries to turn their relationship to his advantage. Mary is fed up with her dog Pepper and enlists Sally's help in finding a new home for him. At home, Harry struggles to complete a book report on Little Women for night school.
58	12	"Dick on a Roll"	Terry Hughes	David Goetsch & Jason Venokur	January 7, 1998	311	12.35
After falling down the stairs while wheeling around in a wheelchair, Dick ends up in one, and leads a campaign to have a second ramp added to his building at Pendleton. Harry is delighted when Vicki Dubcek returns, but less than happy when she announces her newly established celibacy. Tommy is annoyed because he is not old enough to get into a nightclub that Sally and the others are frequenting.
59	13	"The Great Dickdater"	Terry Hughes	David Sacks	January 21, 1998	312	11.21
Dick finally announces that he is ready to start dating again but finds that the women of Rutherford do not want him. Tommy and Harry find somebody's wallet and return it to him, but after Mrs. Dubcek asks them how much in reward they were given, they stalk the owner until he coughs up.
60	14	"36! 24! 36! Dick: Part 1"	Terry Hughes	Bill Martin & Mike Schiff and Christine Zander	January 25, 1998	313	33.66
When Rutherford becomes swamped with beautiful women (Cindy Crawford, Angie Everhart, Irina Pantaeva and Beverly Johnson) who enthusiastically date Average Joes like Dick, Harry, Tommy and Officer Don, Sally begins to suspect that something is amiss and takes it upon herself to investigate. Meanwhile, one of Mary's old students has sent her tickets to Super Bowl XXXII in San Diego and she and Nina attend.
61	15	"36! 24! 36! Dick: Part 2"	Terry Hughes	Bill Martin & Mike Schiff and Christine Zander	January 25, 1998	314	33.66
In order to successfully infiltrate the ranks of the Venusians, Sally has offered herself up as a soldier and been taken to San Diego. Dick, Harry and Tommy eventually catch on and follow the women down there to try to rescue her and save the world from their master plan - to steal Earth's supply of 'good stuff'. Back in Rutherford, Don, Rico, Mrs. Dubcek and Judith settle down to watch the Super Bowl on TV.
62	16	"Pickles and Ice Cream"	Terry Hughes	Bob Kushell	January 28, 1998	315	15.39
Harry runs into trouble when his dog-like pet 'Pickles' (Bill Irwin) from the Solomons' home planet somehow makes it to Rutherford - in human form. He stays with the Solomons, then leaves and ends up in bed with Mrs. Dubcek. Sally pretends to be pregnant to get in with a group of expecting women, but Officer Don finds out and panics. Sally then reveals the truth.
63	17	"Auto Erodicka"	Terry Hughes	Mark Brazill	February 4, 1998	316	12.86
Dick meets a divorcée, Anita, in line at the cinema. After watching the film together, they have casual sex together in his car. He is delighted at having had a one-night stand, but soon runs into trouble when he brags about it at the university and discovers that she is the mother of one of his students, Bug. Sally is shopping for her own car and becomes enthralled by a Dodge Viper. However, she cannot afford it and becomes increasingly exasperated with the salesman, who, she believes, is intent on spoiling her happiness.
64	18	"Portrait of Tommy as an Old Man"	Terry Hughes	Bob Kushell & Gregg Mettler	February 25, 1998	318	9.71
Tommy is tired of being treated like a kid and decides to retire so that he can act the age he truly is (being the oldest of the group in alien form). At work, Mary reveals to Dick that she had always dreamed of being a lounge singer, so he decides to try to help her realize this. Don unwittingly ends up stealing one of Sally's panties, and makes a series of attempts to return it without being caught. (Absent: Elmarie Wendel as Mrs. Dubcek)
65	19	"Stuck With Dick"	Terry Hughes	David M. Israel & Jim O'Doherty	March 18, 1998	317	11.88
Dick decides to try to win back Mary's heart with a romantic champagne evening, and thinks it a lucky opportunity when the pair of them end up locked in the university library all weekend. Sally, Harry and Tommy, meanwhile, are determined to stop the pair getting back together and head to Mary's house to intervene, where they become distracted and end up running up her pay-per-view bill and hosting a Tupperware party that she had planned. (Absent: Elmarie Wendel as Mrs. Dubcek)
66	20	"My Daddy's Little Girl"	Terry Hughes	Mark Brazill & Christine Zander	April 1, 1998	319	10.59
Mary's father arrives in town, announcing that he and her mother have separated again. Unfortunately for Mary, he soon begins dating Sally. After Sally ends it, he goes back to his wife. Harry and Tommy stumble upon Pendleton's university radio station, where Harry takes the controls and becomes a shock jock. (Absent: Elmarie Wendel as Mrs. Dubcek)
67	21	"The Physics of Being Dick"	Terry Hughes	David Schiff	April 15, 1998	323	10.99
Dick demands that Sally and Harry get jobs, so Harry gets work in a bar (Happy Doug's), and Sally as Mary's research assistant. However, upon finding out that Sally has chosen Mary's subject (anthropology), he worries that physics is too boring and strives to spice it up for Tommy's career day. After this goes badly wrong he decides that he wants to be a cop, like Don.
68	22	"Just Your Average Dick"	Terry Hughes	Michael Glouberman & Andrew Orenstein	April 29, 1998	320	11.55
After Mary and August tell the Solomons that they can be a little weird sometimes, they strive to become a completely average family, going as far as to move to a new, average, apartment, make themselves over with new, average clothes and behave in the most average way they can. Unfortunately for Dick, Mary is soon turned off, missing his old weirdness. (Absent: Wayne Knight as Officer Don)
69	23	"Dick and the Other Guy"	Terry Hughes	Bonnie Turner & Terry Turner	April 29, 1998	321	11.55
An eccentric new professor (John Cleese) has arrived at Pendleton University and Dick is quick to befriend him; he soon becomes annoyed when Dr. Neesam appears to be able to do everything better than he can, and becomes a rival for Mary's affections. Sally becomes concerned that Officer Don has lost interest in her after hearing a woman tell him he was "great last night", so Mrs. Dubcek convinces her to disguise herself and follow him around.
70	24	"Sally and Don's First Kiss"	Terry Hughes	David Sacks	May 6, 1998	322	10.33
Don is concerned because he and Sally have never kissed, so Sally turns to romance novels for inspiration, unwittingly building herself up to the moment so much that, when it finally happens, it does not satisfy her expectations. At work, Dick is worried because he is the only person in the university who gets charged for crackers in the cafeteria. Harry finally finishes night school and reminisces about his time there with his friends Larry and Mrs. Deguzman.
71	25	"When Aliens Camp"	Terry Hughes	Story by : Gregg Mettler; Teleplay by : David M. Israel & Jim O'Doherty	May 13, 1998	324	13.31
Dick becomes concerned that the Solomons are spending little time together and orders the family on a camping holiday, forbidding them to bring anyone else. Unfortunately, and much to the other Solomons' annoyance, he invites Mary to join them and, as a result, everybody becomes angry with him. Outcast, he ventures into the woods and ends up becoming leader of a group of young Beaver Scouts, while the other Solomons and Mary attempt to find him. Guest appearances by Miles Marsico, Meredith Baxter and Robert Gentry (Absent: Wayne Knight as Officer Don)
72	26	"The Tooth Harry"	Terry Hughes	Joshua Sternin & Jeffrey Ventimilia	May 20, 1998	325	10.60
Harry drives Nina to the dentist and behaves so sweetly toward her that he ends up stirring her emotions and sparking a romance. At work, Mary has been awarded a place in a promotional video for Pendleton and a jealous Dick takes desperate measures to ensure that he also is granted a place in it. Unfortunately, neither Dick or Mary share the director's vision and end up ruining the video. Officer Don gives Sally a key to his apartment, hoping that the pair can spend more quality time together; however, he regrets it when she begins to treat the place a little too much as if it is her own. (Absent: Elmarie Wendel as Mrs. Dubcek)
73	27	"Eat, Drink, Dick, Mary"	Terry Hughes	Dave Goetsch and Jason Venokur	May 20, 1998	326	14.18
Dick prepares to celebrate his second anniversary of his first real date with Mary, and Vicki Dubcek returns to rekindle her romance with Harry. Sally, however, wants to lose her virginity to Don, but has trouble when Dick, angry that Mary did not know what the celebration was about, locks himself in his bedroom, as her bedroom is on the other side of his. There are more sinister things afoot, however, when Randy (Phil Hartman), a disgruntled ex-lover of Vicki's turns up and kidnaps Harry.: 8 days after this episode aired, Phil Hartman was shot dead by his wife. For this reason, he is only mentioned in passing during the next episode.
