= 3rd Rock from the Sun season 2 =

3rd Rock from the Sun
- Season 2
- DVD cover
- No. of episodes: 26

Release
- Original network: NBC
- Original release: September 22, 1996 – May 18, 1997

Season chronology
- ← Previous; Season 1 Next → Season 3

The second season of 3rd Rock from the Sun, an American television sitcom, began on September 22, 1996, and ended on May 18, 1997. It aired on NBC. The region 1 DVD was released on October 25, 2005.

== Cast and characters ==
=== Main cast ===
- John Lithgow as Dick Solomon
- Kristen Johnston as Sally Solomon
- French Stewart as Harry Solomon
- Joseph Gordon-Levitt as Tommy Solomon
- Jane Curtin as Dr. Mary Albright

=== Recurring cast ===
- Simbi Khali as Nina Campbell
- Elmarie Wendel as Mrs. Mamie Dubcek
- Wayne Knight as Officer Don Leslie Orville
- David DeLuise as Bug Pollone
- Ian Lithgow as Leon
- Danielle Nicolet as Caryn
- Chris Hogan as Aubrey Pitman
- Ileen Getz as Dr. Judith Draper
- Shay Astar as August Leffler
- Jan Hooks as Vicki Dubcek
- Ron West as Dr. Vincent Strudwick

== Episodes ==
No. overall	No. in season	Title	Directed by	Written by	Original release date	Prod. code	Viewers (millions)
21	1	"See Dick Continue to Run"	Robert Berlinger	Bill Martin & Mike Schiff	September 22, 1996	201	22.45
22	2	"See Dick Continue to Run"	Robert Berlinger	Bill Martin & Mike Schiff	September 22, 1996	202	22.45
'Evil Dick' proceeds to take over the Solomon family and boss them around. He asks them to fetch a list of materials with which he secretly plans to spawn his own private army of clones; he then asks Mary to dinner at his house, hoping to lure her into bed. Just as Sally, Harry and Tommy have had enough of 'Evil Dick', Harry discovers that the real Dick is still locked in the basement. The Solomons free the real Dick, who arrives upstairs to find his evil counterpart wooing Mary in the living room. Dick is upset by this, and retreats outside to the Rambler, but his family tell him that they've had enough of his evil counterpart, and convince Nice Dick to take on and defeat Evil Dick. Special Guest: Dennis Rodman
23	3	"Hotel Dick"	Robert Berlinger	Bob Kushell	September 29, 1996	205	21.14
Now that he is growing closer to Mary, Dick begins to feel that he should tell her the truth about where he and the others really come from. Unable to find the right situation in which to do this, however, he takes his family to a sci-fi convention, where Sally falls in love with the room service at the hotel, orders far too much, and racks up an enormous bill. At the end, George Takei is given the bill of $30,000. In 1997, TV Guide ranked this episode #75 on its list of the 100 Greatest Episodes. Special guest George Takei.
24	4	"Big Angry Virgin from Outer Space"	Robert Berlinger	Christine Zander	October 6, 1996	203	18.4
Relationships are in trouble; Sally and Mr. Randall are fighting because Mr. Randall feels that Sally takes charge of their relationship, and Dick suggests that having sex might solve the problem. Meanwhile, Tommy's girlfriend August decides to test his loyalty to her by pretending that her face has been disfigured in an accident.
25	5	"Much Ado About Dick"	Robert Berlinger	Michael Glouberman & Andrew Orenstein	October 13, 1996	204	16.7
Mary does not want anybody in the department to know that she and Dick are in a relationship, but Dick does not understand why. Sally runs into Officer Don again and decides that she wants to become a cop, much to Dick's horror. Tommy is frustrated because he does not have any transportation.
26	6	"Dick the Vote"	Robert Berlinger	Story by : Joe Fisch; Teleplay by : David Goetsch & Jason Venokur	October 27, 1996	207	15.6
The local park is about to be developed and when Harry accidentally chains himself to a tree with his bike; he is mistaken for an activist and asked to run for city council. However, Dick struggles to understand the concept of each person's opinion counting, believing there to be a right and a wrong party to vote for, and that Harry is standing for the wrong party. Meanwhile, an underhand opposition leader (Al Franken) hires Officer Don to dig up dirt on Harry, hoping to damage his campaign and stop him from winning.
27	7	"Fourth and Dick"	Robert Berlinger	Michael Glouberman & Andrew Orenstein	November 3, 1996	206	17.7
It is homecoming weekend and everybody is excited about the football game, except for Dick, who cannot understand what all the fuss is about, and believes Pendleton University to have no chance of winning. Harry gets a job as a member of the security staff at the game, and Sally befriends Nina and accompanies her to the event. Tommy is attracted to his glee club teacher, and invites her to the game to seduce her.
28	8	"World's Greatest Dick"	Robert Berlinger	David Goetsch & Jason Venokur	November 10, 1996	208	18.55
Dick enlists Tommy in a school for gifted students, hoping to achieve some degree of pride as his 'father', but Tommy dislikes the school and wants to return to his public high school. Sally enters what she does not realise is a gay bar. She meets a gay man whom she is attracted to, but does not realize his sexual orientation. He assumes that she is a drag queen; he is shocked and disappointed when he discovers that she is a woman. Guest appearances by Valarie Rae Miller and Ken Howard.
29	9	"My Mother the Alien"	Robert Berlinger	David M. Israel & Jim O'Doherty	November 17, 1996	209	19.66
Mrs. Dubcek asks the Solomons to babysit her grandson while she is away. Sally becomes attached to the boy and refuses to give him back. Dick pleads with Mary to let him feed her fish when she goes away. He accidentally kills them all, when he buys them a carnivorous 'friend'.
30	10	"Gobble, Gobble, Dick, Dick"	Robert Berlinger	Bob Kushell & Christine Zander	November 24, 1996	210	18.6
It is Thanksgiving, but the Solomons have no idea what is going on, and think that the world is ending, because everybody is either leaving town hurriedly or buying large amounts of food. Once they realize what is really going on, they invite Mary, Mrs. Dubcek and Mrs. Dubcek's daughter Vicki (Jan Hooks) to eat dinner with them, but Dick ends up falling out with Tommy, who storms off. Harry and Vicki are attracted to each other, and have sex on Mrs. Dubcek's kitchen table.
31	11	"Dick Jokes"	Robert Berlinger	David M. Israel & Jim O'Doherty	December 8, 1996	211	15.2
The Solomons visit a comedy club, where a comedian is making jokes about his mother, but Dick struggles to understand why the ridicule is funny. Meanwhile, Mary is holding an event and has asked another faculty member to host it, causing Dick to become jealous and strive to be funny, so that Mary might choose him instead. Sally builds shelves to hold her growing collection of shoes. Harry is upset because he has lost his beloved fur coat.
32	12	"Jolly Old St. Dick"	Robert Berlinger	Bill Martin & Mike Schiff	December 15, 1996	212	19.17
The Solomons are excitedly preparing for Christmas. Sally has a festive job as a gift wrapper and Harry as Santa's assistant in the mall, but their Christmas spirit is drowned when Dick is arrested for attempting to cut somebody's tree down for his living room, Sally and her shoppers get into an argument and Harry discovers that the Santa he is working for is not the real one, while Tommy is frustrated that girlfriend August will not tell him what she wants for Christmas.
33	13	"Proud Dick"	Robert Berlinger	David Sacks	January 5, 1997	213	18.65
When Mary is given a better parking space than Dick, he becomes jealous and threatens to quit his job, but this gets him fired, and he is too proud to ask for his job back, remaining convinced that the university will cave in and offer it back. To make ends meet, he gets a job working in Rusty's, a local burger bar, but he is made fun of by his students. Harry is blown off the roof by a tornado and temporarily loses his memory, leaving him terrified when he discovers he is living with aliens.
34	14	"Romeo & Juliet & Dick"	Robert Berlinger	Bonnie Turner & Terry Turner	January 12, 1997	214	23.44
Tommy asks Dick to direct his school production of Romeo and Juliet, in the hope that he will be able to play Romeo, and his girlfriend Juliet. However, in typical fashion, Dick takes over the play and dominates the actors, demoting Tommy to 'prop guy'. At home, Tommy has to make the poison that Juliet must drink, but Mrs. Dubcek accidentally drinks it and passes out, leading to a complicated situation when some of her old friends visit. Mary's parking fines have finally caught up with her, and she is faced with a huge charge, but Sally is convinced that Officer Don can get rid of them.
35	15	"Guilty as Dick"	Robert Berlinger	David Goetsch & Jason Venokur	February 2, 1997	215	18.39
While adjusting a vent for Mary, Dick falls and sprains his ankle. Mary feels guilty and tends to Dick's every need while he lies hurt in bed, and he soon comes to realize that this could be used to his advantage. Harry is tired of sleeping on the washing machine and is seeking a new bedroom, so builds a den in a tree. Elsewhere, Tommy struggles to sell chocolate for school, until he realizes that he can use Sally's sex appeal.
36	16	"A Dick on One Knee"	Terry Hughes	Christine Zander	February 16, 1997	217	17.46
Sally meets a French immigrant called Michel, who asks her to marry him so that he can remain in the country. Sally and the Solomons are overwhelmed, but Mary thinks that it is too soon. Meanwhile, Tommy is sent out to find a bouquet for the wedding and discovers that he has a talent for arranging flowers. Dick, inspired by Sally's wedding plans, talks about marriage with Mary.
37	17	"Same Old Song and Dick"	Robert Berlinger	Katy Ballard	March 9, 1997	216	15.99
Dick feels that his relationship with Mary is in a rut, since it does not appear to be as exciting as it used to be, and strives to find new ways of livening it up. Sally and Harry switch jobs, with Sally spending all day watching television and Harry doing all the shopping and housework; however, while Harry loves his new job, feeling a sense of purpose, Sally cannot stand doing nothing all day. At school, Tommy is delighted when he discovers that August has faults.
38	18	"I Brake for Dick"	Robert Berlinger	Gregg Mettler	March 16, 1997	218	15.06
Dick becomes upset when he accidentally hits a chipmunk with his car and becomes an animal rights activist, refusing to allow his family to wear or eat anything that is made from animal products. Meanwhile, Harry has become a scout and is breeding ants in the house, but Dick will not let Sally kill them. After Dick nurses the chipmunk back to health and releases it into wild, it is immediately attacked by a bird. Dick throws a rock at the bird, only to be horrified when Harry tells him he has killed an endangered peregrine falcon. Tommy feels guilty because he neglected to ask August to the school dance, and is trying to pen a letter to an agony aunt in the paper.
39	19	"Dick Behaving Badly"	Robert Berlinger	Bob Kushell	March 23, 1997	219	15.76
When the Solomons accuse Dick of being "whipped" by Mary, Dick decides to try to become his own man, enlisting Harry's help to do so, and tells her that he will not be attending the party that they are holding. Meanwhile, Sally and Tommy have a showdown with the game Monopoly, but it begins to spiral out of control, with each of the pair taking it too seriously.
40	20	"Dickmalion"	Robert Berlinger	Michael Glouberman & Andrew Orenstein	April 13, 1997	220	12.40
Mary is trying to get in with Rutherford's high society, so she lets them use her house for an auction. She invites Dick, and her upper-class neighbors take to him immediately, and he earns the pair of them an invitation to their clubhouse. Sally and Harry take up wrestling each other at home. At school, Tommy tries to impress a girl (Linda Cardellini) by becoming a punk.
41	21	"Sensitive Dick"	Terry Hughes	David Sacks	April 27, 1997	221	14.89
When Dick's class annoys him, he makes them write humiliating letters to their parents apologizing for wasting their money, and they file a complaint against him. He is required to attend sensitivity training classes, and subsequently becomes unprofessionally soft and loving, earning him a second complaint, which lands him in a hearing. Mrs. Dubcek's daughter Vicki returns for her high school reunion and Harry escorts her as her date. Sally persuades Officer Don to let Tommy behind the wheel of his squad car, so that he can learn to drive.
42	22	"Will Work for Dick"	Terry Hughes	Dave Goetsch & Jason Venokur	May 4, 1997	223	12.95
Finally fed up with Dick, Nina quits as his secretary and Dick hires Harry instead. Harry makes for a bad secretary and Dick snaps endlessly at him, causing Nina to tell Harry to fight back. Meanwhile, to further study the human experience, Sally decides that she wants to 're-live' the childhood that she never had, and attends a ballet school for children.
43	23	"Fifteen Minutes of Dick"	Terry Hughes	David M. Israel & Jim O'Doherty	May 11, 1997	222	15.09
When Mark Hamill unknowingly takes the Solomons' usual table in a restaurant, Sally beats him up and unwittingly becomes a local hero, appearing on local television and receiving visits from the press. While Harry is ecstatic and volunteers himself as Sally's loyal assistant, Dick becomes extremely jealous and wants a piece of the limelight himself.
44	24	"Dick and the Single Girl"	Terry Hughes	Mark Brazill & Christine Zander	May 11, 1997	224	16.36
Mary introduces Dick to a shy, bookish professor who is leaving the faculty, only to be horrified when she takes a liking to him. Meanwhile, Sally begins to realize that she is only attracted to Officer Don because of his police uniform. Harry and Tommy attempt to pen their own, perfect, episode of The X-Files.
45	25	"A Nightmare on Dick Street"	Terry Hughes	Story by : Bonnie Turner & Terry Turner & David Sacks; Teleplay by : Bill Martin & Mike Schiff & Bob Kushell	May 18, 1997	225	20.15
46	26	"A Nightmare on Dick Street"	Terry Hughes	Story by : Bonnie Turner & Terry Turner & David Sacks; Teleplay by : Bill Martin & Mike Schiff & Bob Kushell	May 18, 1997	226	20.15
When Mary announces that she is going to Borneo for a year, Dick is desperate to keep her from leaving, so Nina hints that he should propose to her. Dick and Sally experience dreaming for the first time and become convinced that they are losing their minds, so they start taking pills, which make the situation worse by spacing Dick and Sally out so that they do not have a clue what is going on. As a result, when Mary confronts Dick, voicing her worry about leaving him, he appears not to care and she decides to go to Borneo. Harry and Tommy decide to contact the home planet and request that the unit be brought home for emergency maintenance, possibly to never return. Harry and Tommy inform Dick that they leave Earth that night, but he refuses to leave Mary. Back at home, Harry and Tommy experience their first dreams as well, and believe that they too are losing their minds. When the time to leave arrives, the aliens find Dick, but he tells them that he is staying on Earth with Mary, and, reluctantly, they leave without him. Upon talking to Mary, however, Dick realizes that the dreams that they have been having are entirely normal and rushes to find his family before it is too late.
