= Brake (film) =

- Theatrical release poster
- Directed by: Gabe Torres
- Written by: Timothy Mannion
- Produced by: James Walker; Nathan West; Gabe Torres
- Starring: Stephen Dorff; Chyler Leigh; JR Bourne; Tom Berenger
- Cinematography: James Mathers
- Edited by: Sam Restivo
- Music by: Brian Tyler
- Production company: Walking West Entertainment
- Distributed by: IFC Films
- Release date: March 23, 2012
- Running time: 92 minutes
- Country: United States
- Language: English

Brake is a 2012 American action thriller film directed by Gabe Torres, written by Timothy Mannion, and starring Stephen Dorff. It follows a U.S. Secret Service special agent who is held captive in the trunk of a car by terrorists aiming to extract information about the U.S. president's secret bunker. It was released on 23 March 2012.

== Plot ==
Jeremy Reins, a U.S. Secret Service special agent assigned to the presidential detail, is drugged, kidnapped and held captive within a glass box in the cramped, dark trunk of a car. At first Jeremy thinks it is a prank from people he owes money for gambling debts, but he quickly learns that the truth is far more sinister. Jeremy begins to endure mental and physical torture as terrorists attempt to extract information. The information needed is the location of the secret bunkers, dubbed "Roulette", that are used by the president and vice president during a national emergency.

Jeremy's only contact is Henry, another hostage that is also locked in a trunk of a car; both hostages have timers in the trunk with them that counts down. The terrorists have left old radios in the trunk to allow them to communicate with their hostages as well as allowing Jeremy and Henry to talk to one another. Through long conversations, Jeremy learns that the cars are actually bombs, and that they are currently in Maryland traveling towards Washington D.C. The car is almost pulled over by police and a high speed chase ensues but Jeremy is unable to be rescued, although the box is shot, leaving a hole in the glass. Jeremy is tortured every time the counter hits zero, at one point bees are released into his tank, since he is allergic to bee stings. However, the terrorists give him an Epi-pen injection, saving his life: they need him alive. The terrorists also kidnap his estranged wife, Molly, and hold her in another trunk. After enduring much emotional and mental stress, Jeremy still refuses to give up the location. After his countdown reaches zero, Jeremy's glass box begins to flood with liquid. After nearly drowning, Jeremy is pulled out by someone, revealed to be Henry.

It is revealed that the whole situation was an exercise to test whether Jeremy would break or not. Everyone he saw or was in contact with is present, along with their radios, which they used to play their parts. Jeremy collapses from his wounds and is put in an ambulance with Molly. On the way to the hospital, he sees the Washington monument through the window and chuckles. Noticing this, Molly looks out the window and asks if the monument was the location, but Jeremy dismisses it as unimportant and gives her an engagement ring, asking her to marry him. When she replies that they are already married, Jeremy smiles and asks her to marry him again. As they kiss, Molly handcuffs him to the gurney and pulls a wire from her shirt. Revealing themselves to really be with the terrorists, Molly and Henry are told over the radio that they have the location now that they lured him into a false sense of security and Jeremy is to be killed. As Molly holds a gas-filled mask over Jeremy's face, the film cuts to black.

== Cast ==
- Stephen Dorff as Jeremy Reins
- Chyler Leigh as Molly Reins
- JR Bourne as Henry Shaw
- Tom Berenger as Ben Reynolds
- Pruitt Taylor Vince as Driver (voice)
- Sammy Sheik as Marco (voice)
- Kent Shocknek as News Anchor Jack Stern (voice)

== Production ==
Filming took place in California, primarily North Hollywood, using the Red One camera. According to director Torres, what drew many collaborators to the film was the daunting task and cinematic challenge to create an intense action film set almost entirely in the trunk of a car.

== Reception ==
Rotten Tomatoes, a review aggregator, reports that 44% of 27 surveyed critics gave the film a positive review; the average rating was 5/10. Metacritic rated it 38/100 based on eleven reviews. Stephen Holden of The New York Times wrote that the film exists for its Twilight Zone-style "gotcha" twist ending. Glenn Whipp of the Los Angeles Times wrote that the film's twists are preposterous and negate everything that came before them. Robert Koehler of Variety wrote that the script "leaves audiences feeling played" but Dorff "fully commits" to the role.

The film has been compared to a similarly themed film, Buried starring Ryan Reynolds.
