= The Tracy Morgan Show =

American television sitcom

- Genre: Sitcom
- Created by: David M. Israel; Jim O'Doherty
- Written by: Tom J. Astle; Anthony Carter; Andy Glickman; Peter Huyck; David Israel; Steve Joe; Bob Kushell; Sally Lapiduss; Bernadette Luckett; Tracy Morgan; Judah Miller; Murray Miller; Jim O'Doherty; Greg Schaffer
- Directed by: Robert Berlinger; Sheldon Epps; Leonard R. Garner Jr. Gary Halvorson; Gail Mancuso; John Putch; David Schwimmer; Keith Truesdell; Andrew Tsao
- Starring: Tracy Morgan; Tamala Jones; Marc John Jefferies; Bobb'e J. Thompson
- Theme music composer: Heavy D
- Composer: Heavy D
- Country of origin: United States
- Original language: English
- No. of seasons: 1
- No. of episodes: 18 (2 unaired)

Production
- Executive producers: Dave Becky; Marcy Carsey; David Israel; Caryn Mandabach; Lorne Michaels; David Miner; Jim O'Doherty; Tom Werner
- Producers: Steve Joe; Bernadette Luckett; Tracy Morgan; Greg Schaffer; Shawn Wilt
- Cinematography: Donald A. Morgan; John Simmons
- Editors: Sean K. Lambert; Michael Karlich
- Camera setup: Multi-camera
- Running time: 24 minutes
- Production companies: Broadway Video; Carsey-Werner-Mandabach Productions; NBC Studios

Original release
- Network: NBC
- Release: December 2, 2003 – March 20, 2004

The Tracy Morgan Show is an American television sitcom created by David M. Israel and Jim O'Doherty, that aired on NBC from December 2, 2003 to March 20, 2004. The series stars former SNL cast member Tracy Morgan and Tamala Jones. The show was canceled in its first season after 16 episodes (the other 2 were never aired).

== Synopsis ==
Tracy Morgan portrays "Tracy Mitchell", who is the owner of an auto repair garage. He has a wife named Alicia (Tamala Jones), a teenaged son named Derrick (Marc John Jefferies) and a seven-year-old named Jimmy (Bobb'e J. Thompson) as well as Aunt Pearl (Esther Scott).

== Cast ==
=== Main ===
- Tracy Morgan – Tracy Mitchell
- Tamala Jones – Alicia Mitchell
- Marc John Jefferies – Derrick Mitchell
- Bobb'e J. Thompson – Jimmy Mitchell
- Katt Williams – Freddie
- Heavy D – Bernard
- John Witherspoon – Spoon

=== Supporting ===
- Bre Blair – Marcy
- Keesha Sharp – Linda Berry
- Myzel Robinson – Robert Berry
- Debra Jo Rupp – Ms. Laneworthy
- Tracy Morgan, Jr. – Superintendent Albano/Jack

== Production ==
The series was created by David M. Israel and Jim O'Doherty, who also served as executive producers. Additional executive producers include Marcy Carsey, Caryn Mandabach, Lorne Michaels, David Miner, and Tom Werner.

Cast member Heavy D composed the series' music and theme song.

Bobb'e J. Thompson would go on to play Tracy Morgan’s character's son again in the hit series 30 Rock.

== Episodes ==
No.	Title	Directed by	Written by	Original release date	Prod. code	Viewers (millions)
1	"Pilot"	Gary Halvorson	David M. Israel & Jim O'Doherty	December 2, 2003	001	9.88
2	"Doctor? No!"	Gary Halvorson	Peter Huyck & Alex Gregory	December 2, 2003	002	8.72
3	"Christmas"	John Putch	Bernadette Luckett Strzeminski	December 4, 2003	013	11.68
4	"The Anniversary"	Sheldon Epps	Bob Kushell	December 9, 2003	011	7.64
5	"Stealing"	Leonard R. Garner Jr.	Judah Miller & Murray Miller	December 16, 2003	005	7.89
6	"Coach Tracy"	Andrew Tsao	Tony Carter	January 6, 2004	004	7.69
7	"Church"	Leonard R. Garner Jr.	Judah Miller & Murray Miller	January 13, 2004	008	6.83
8	"The Value of Money"	Gail Mancuso	Sally Lapiduss	January 20, 2004	009	5.69
9	"Weird Science"	Gail Mancuso	Tom J. Astle	January 27, 2004	010	5.57
10	"A Call to Duty"	Gary Halvorson	Bernadette Luckett Strzeminski	January 31, 2004	003	4.24
11	"Miracle Street"	David Schwimmer	Steve Joe & Greg Schaffer	February 7, 2004	006	3.12
12	"Vacation"	Andrew Tsao	Tom J. Astle	February 14, 2004	014	3.76
13	"Super Boy"	Andrew Tsao	Andy Glickman	February 28, 2004	012	3.60
14	"Class Clown"	Robert Berlinger	Steve Joe & Greg Schaffer	March 6, 2004	017	3.54
15	"Career Day"	Andrew Tsao	Bob Kushell	March 20, 2004	015	3.81
16	"The Sporting Life"	John Putch	David M. Israel & Jim O'Doherty	March 20, 2004	018	3.85
17	"Spoon Moves In"	Keith Truesdell	Judah Miller & Murray Miller	Unaired	007	N/A
18	"Haircut Night"	N/A	Peter Huyck & Alex Gregory	Unaired	016	N/A

== Broadcast and syndication ==
In 2006, The Box Comedy aired the series, including the two unaired episodes. It disappeared when the channel was transformed to Comedy Central, until it was rerun in 2010. The show is currently aired by Comedy Central Family. On May 31, 2010, TV One aired the series in its entirety, including the two unaired episodes.
