= Chyler Leigh =

American actress, singer and model (born 1982)

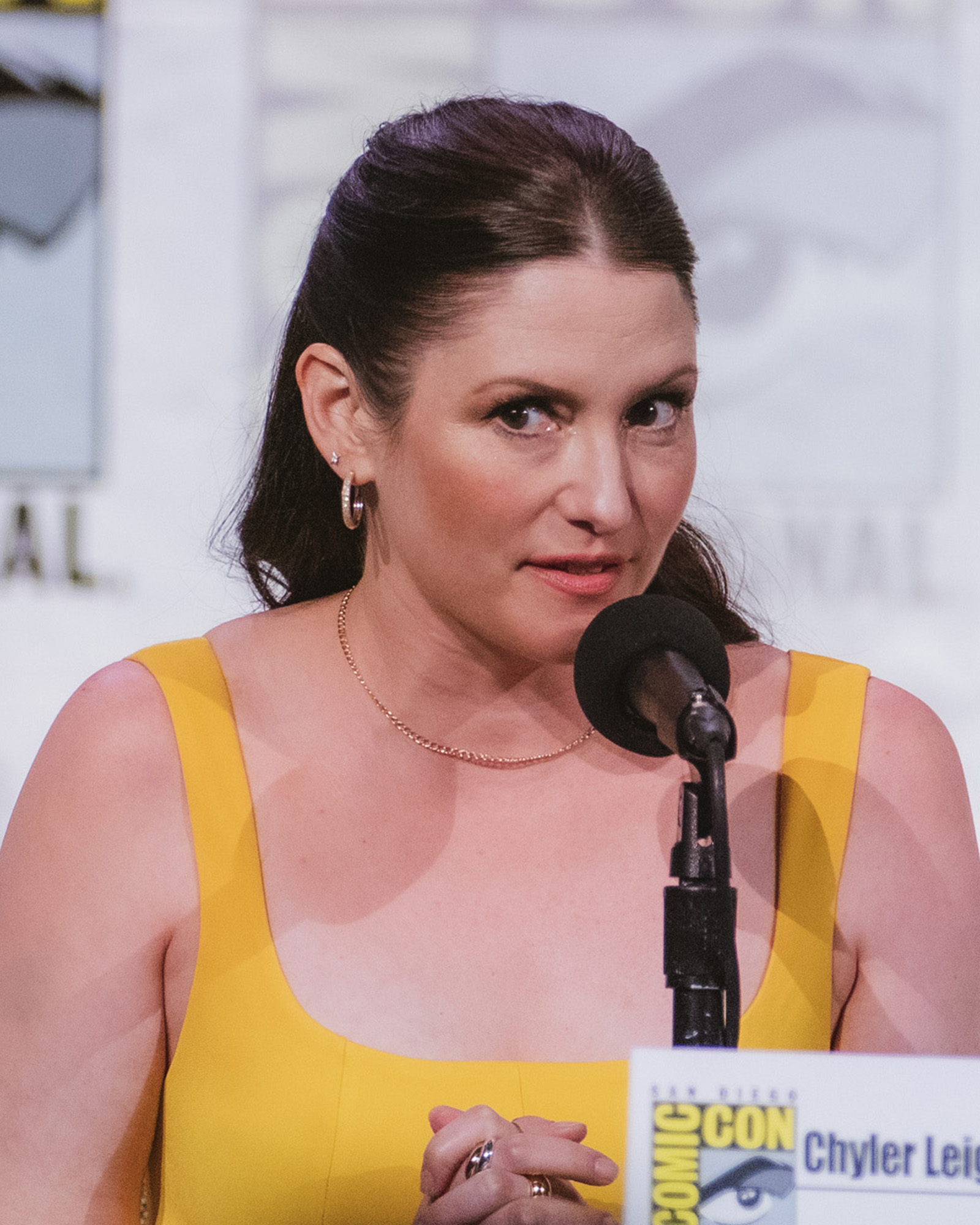
- Leigh at the 2025 San Diego Comic Con in San Diego, California
- Born: Chyler Leigh Potts; April 10, 1982 (age 44); Charlotte, North Carolina, U.S.
- Occupations: Actress; singer; model
- Years active: 1996–present
- Spouse: Nathan West (m. 2002; div. 2025)
- Children: 3
- Awards: Young Hollywood Awards
- Musical career
- Also known as: WestLeigh (with Nathan West)
- Instrument: Vocals

Chyler Leigh West (pronounced /ˈkaɪlər/ KY-lər; née Potts; born April 10, 1982) is an American actress, singer, and model. She is best known for her roles as Janey Briggs in the comedy Not Another Teen Movie (2001), Dr. Lexie Grey in the ABC medical drama series Grey's Anatomy (2007–2012; 2021), Alex Danvers in the DC Comics superhero series Supergirl (2015–2021), and Katherine "Kat" Landry in the Hallmark drama The Way Home (2023–2026).

== Early life ==
Leigh was born in Charlotte, North Carolina, on April 10, 1982, to Yvonne Norton and Robert Potts. She grew up in Virginia Beach, Virginia, where her parents ran a weight-loss business. The business went bankrupt when she was eight and her parents' marriage ended when she was 12. She, her mother, and her older brother, former actor Christopher Khayman Lee, moved to Miami, where her mother remarried her first husband. Leigh was estranged from her father for many years after her parents' divorce, but they have since reconciled.

Leigh was in eighth grade when she started modeling. She acted in local television commercials and Hall Pass, a syndicated teen news show. In 1999, Leigh and her mother moved to Los Angeles to be in acting. At 16, she passed the California High School Proficiency Exam.

=== Drug addiction and recovery ===
At age 16, Leigh met 20-year-old Nathan West, when they both attended auditions for the pilot of Saving Graces, an unsuccessful series on The WB. They began a relationship and Leigh left home to move in with West. Leigh said they were "broken", both having had troubled family lives and difficult upbringings. That led to abuse of drugs, which quickly escalated into addiction. Joel Gallen, the director of Not Another Teen Movie told her that she looked unhealthily thin. Around that time, a friend invited them to a non-denominational Christian church service. They went, and it helped them in recovery. She and West subsequently married.

== Career ==
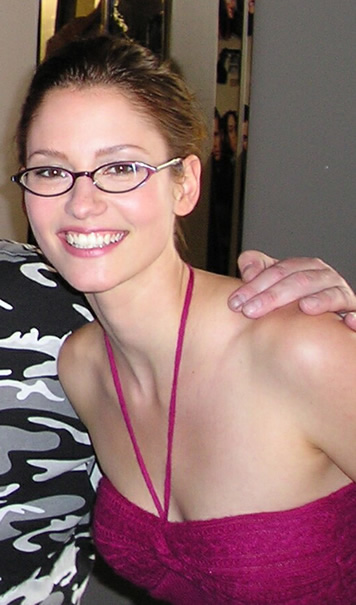
Leigh in Los Angeles, 2006

Leigh began acting at an early age and debuted in film at 15 with 1997's Kickboxing Academy (1997). She started hosting local TV shows and modeling; in 2001, Leigh nabbed the lead role in the box office success, Not Another Teen Movie, as Janey Briggs opposite Chris Evans. She also appeared with the cast of the movie in Marilyn Manson's music video "Tainted Love", a song which was in the film. She was 65th on the Maxim Hot 100 Women of 2002. In 2002, Leigh was cast in two short-lived TV series: Girls Club, in which she played lawyer Sarah Mickle, and That '80s Show, playing punk rocker June Tuesday. She then became a series regular on the ABC legal drama The Practice, but was let go at the end of the season due to budget cuts. She joined the cast of Reunion in September 2005.

In Grey's Anatomy, Leigh first appeared as a woman in Joe's bar who was noticed by Derek Shepherd during the final two episodes of the third season, and her character is later revealed to be Lexie Grey, the younger half-sister of the titular character. Leigh was made an official series regular for season four and remained so until the eighth-season finale, as Leigh chose to depart from the show after five years to spend more time with her family. She makes music with her husband Nathan West (East of Eli), under the name "WestLeigh". They have performed covers and original songs. In 2015 for their 13th anniversary, they wrote "Love Lit the Sky". On Valentine's Day 2017, they released the single "Nowhere". Leigh has taken part in several of her husband's tours. On June 18, 2017, a single "Spirit of Samba" by Laurent Voulzy was released featuring Leigh, Nina Miranda, Luisa Maita, and Eloisia; in France, it reached the 99th position on the Syndicat National de l'Édition Phonographique chart.

From 2015 to 2021, Leigh starred in the CBS/The CW DC Comics television series Supergirl as Alex Danvers, the elder adopted sister of the titular character and a scientist and government agent at the Department of Extranormal Operations. She reprised the role on Arrow, The Flash, and Legends of Tomorrow during crossover events Crisis on Earth-X, Crisis on Infinite Earths, and "Armageddon". She made her directorial debut with the season six episode "Prom Again!". In April 2021, Leigh returned to Grey's Anatomy for the episode "Breathe". Since 2023, she has co-starred in the Hallmark Channel series The Way Home with Andie MacDowell.

== Personal life ==
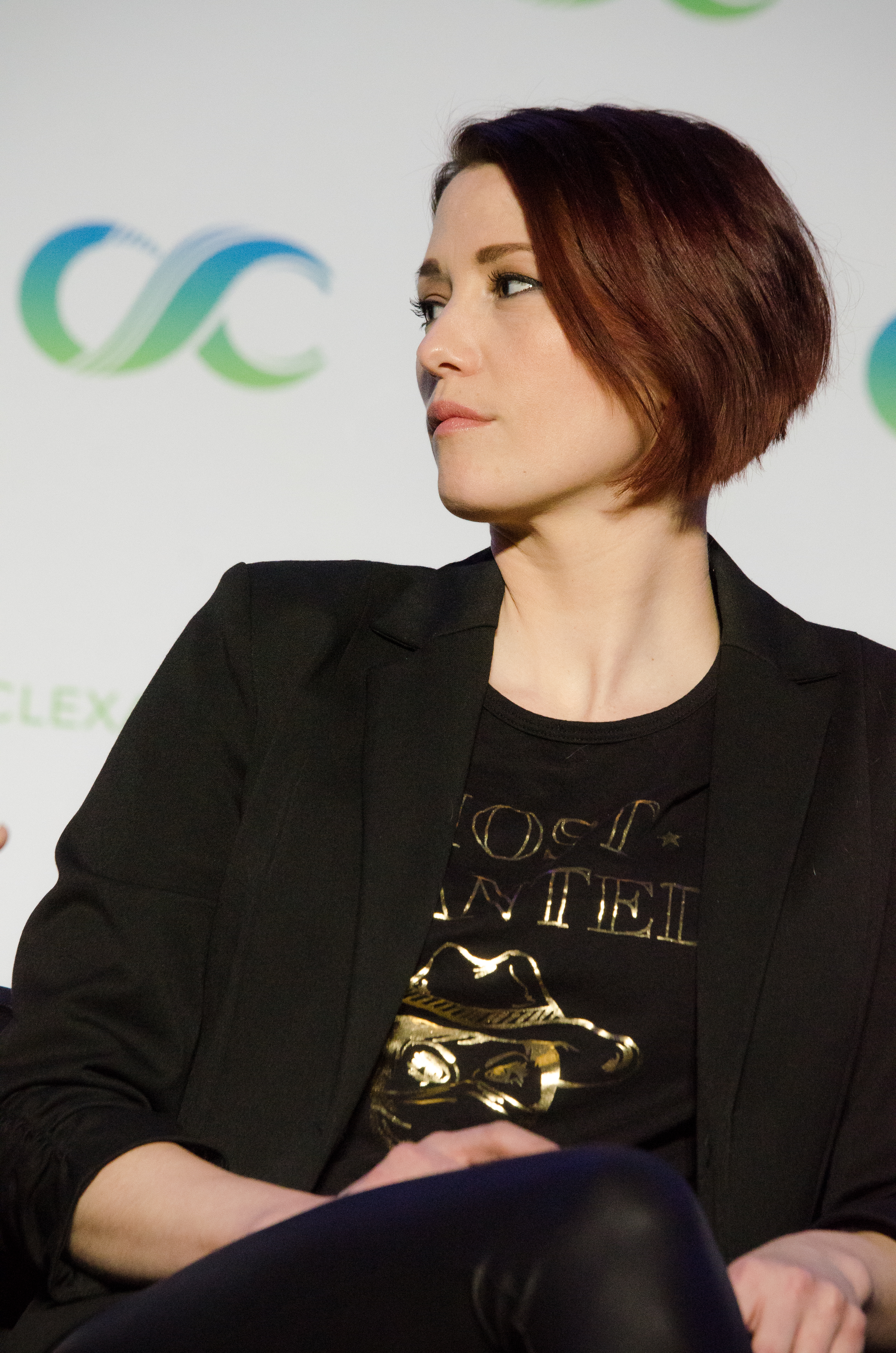
Leigh in April 2018

In 2002, Leigh married fellow actor Nathan West in Alaska. The couple worked together in 2000 on the television series 7th Heaven on The WB and The CW, playing Mary Camden's (Jessica Biel) troubled friends Frankie and Johnnie. Leigh and West have three children—a son and two daughters (born in 2003, 2006, and 2009). In 2026, Leigh revealed that she and West had split. West had quietly filed for divorce and they separated in June 2024; their divorce was finalized in June 2025. Leigh and West remain on good terms and now co-parent their youngest daughter.

Leigh was a Christian and credited her faith in 2007–2008 and a "really awesome church" with giving her husband and her "a reason to live". Her current beliefs held are that there is a Source "Witchy WooWoo and all". She supports The Thirst Project, a nonprofit organization in America, which aims to bring safe drinking water to communities around the world. In 2019, Leigh revealed that she had been diagnosed with bipolar disorder a decade earlier. In mid 2020, she published a statement on the Create Change website, an advocacy website she cofounded, in which she expressed an emotional connection with her Supergirl character's coming-out scene. Several websites and media outlets, especially those connected with LGBTQ advocacy, interpreted the statement as Leigh's own coming-out about her sexuality.

Leigh and her family were living in Los Angeles including in Sherman Oaks, but split their time between Vancouver and Nashville. During mid-2020, Leigh contracted COVID-19; she described her experience in an article published to createchange.me on October 14, 2020:

I lost about a month's worth of time, laying in bed, waving to my children in the hallway with a mask on so they didn't see how sick I was from COVID-19. Almost "game-over" sick. The only time I had with my husband was spent six feet apart on our bedroom balcony in the morning for a soul-lifting hour to just be with one another or when he donned his mask coming in the room to take care of me, bravely bringing food and Gatorade (which half the time I wasn't able to taste). Golden moments in the midst of darkness. I will say I'm incredibly lucky, though. By the grace of God, no one else got sick... although there were a few occasions it almost seemed necessary, I didn't have to go to the hospital. I think getting through a sickness of that magnitude definitely earned me a level up. My body defeated what I thought was impossible and I got a proper restart.

== Filmography ==
=== Films ===
Year	Title	Role	Notes
1997	Kickboxing Academy	Cindy	
2001	Not Another Teen Movie	Janey Briggs	
2010	The 19th Wife	Queenie Alton	Television film
2012	Brake	Molly Reins	Also co-producer
2013	Window Wonderland	Sloan Van Doren	Television film

=== Television ===
Year	Title	Role	Notes
1996	Hall Pass	Herself	Co-host
1999	Saving Graces	Grace Smith	Unsold television pilot
1999	Safe Harbor	Jamie Martin	Main role; 10 episodes
2000	M.Y.O.B.	N/A	Episode: "Bad Seed"
2000	7th Heaven	Frankie	3 episodes
2000	Wilder Days	Rip	Unsold television pilot
2002	That '80s Show	June Tuesday	Main role; 13 episodes
2002	Girls Club	Sarah Mickle	Main role; 9 episodes
2003	The Practice	Claire Wyatt	Main role (season 8); 22 episodes
2004	North Shore	Kate Spangler	Episode: "My Boyfriend's Back"
2005	Rocky Point	Cassie Flynn	Unsold television pilot
2005–2006	Reunion	Carla Noll	Main role; 13 episodes
2007–2012, 2021	Grey's Anatomy	Dr. Alexandra Caroline "Lexie" Grey	Guest role (season 3); Main role (seasons 4–8); special guest (season 17); 115 episodes
2012	Private Practice	Dr. Alexandra Caroline "Lexie" Grey	Episode: "You Break My Heart" (Season 5)
2014	Taxi Brooklyn	Detective Caitlyn "Cat" Sullivan	Main role; 12 episodes
2015–2021	Supergirl	Alexandra "Alex" Danvers / Sentinel	Main role; 126 episodes; also director: "Prom Again"
2017	Arrow	Alexandra "Alex" Danvers / Sentinel	Episode: "Crisis on Earth-X"
2017, 2021	The Flash	Alexandra "Alex" Danvers / Sentinel	Episodes: "Crisis on Earth-X", "Armageddon, Parts 2-4"
2017, 2020	Legends of Tomorrow	Alexandra "Alex" Danvers / Sentinel	Episodes: "Crisis on Earth-X", "Crisis on Infinite Earths"
2023–2026	The Way Home	Katherine "Kat" Landry Dhawan	Main role; 40 episodes; also executive producer

=== Music videos ===
- "Tainted Love" (2001) by Marilyn Manson

== Awards and nominations ==
Year	Award	Category	Work	Result	Ref
2000	Young Artist Awards	Best Performance in a TV Series - Young Ensemble	Safe Harbor (shared with cast)	Nominated	
2002	Young Hollywood Awards	Exciting New Face-Female	Herself	Won	
2006	Screen Actors Guild Awards	Screen Actors Guild Award for Outstanding Performance by an Ensemble in a Drama Series	Grey's Anatomy (shared with cast)	Nominated	
