= Kickboxing Academy =

- Directed by: Richard Gabai
- Written by: Richard Gabai; Lawrence A. Maddox
- Produced by: Sam Lupowitz
- Starring: Steven Bauer; Chyler Leigh
- Cinematography: Lawrence A. Maddox
- Music by: Larry Berliner; Michael Morrell
- Release date: 1997
- Language: English

Kickboxing Academy, also known as Teen Boxer, is a 1997 American action film directed by Richard Gabai and starring Steven Bauer and Chyler Leigh.

== Plot ==
Brothers Brian and Chet set out in Chet's red convertible to drop Brian off at Kickboxing Academy, a Dojo run by the kind and caring instructor June. Across the street from Kickboxing Academy is the brutal Fatal Combat dojo, run by the ruthless and psychotic instructor Tarbeck.

At a party, Kickboxing Academy students Cindy and Melinda are propositioned by three students from Fatal Combat. They refuse the advances of the Fatal Combat students. Treck and Soupy, also in attendance at the party, leave. On their way home Treck and Soupy are attacked by the Fatal Combat students, but are defended by a mysterious, long haired figure.

Chet leaves the garage he works at in his red convertible to go pick up Cindy, his girlfriend. They stop at a gas station, where the attendant is the mysterious, long haired figure. He is revealed to be Danny, a former Kickboxing Academy student who was the best, but has since quit competition kickboxing.

Treck and Soupy decide to sign up for classes at Kickboxing Academy. On their way in, they are spotted from across the street by Tarbeck, who sends two Fatal Combat students to assault the boys. They begin bullying Treck and Soupy, but are stopped by June, who defeats the students and welcomes Treck and Soupy to the dojo.

Shortly after, Tarbeck shows up to Kickboxing Academy with Maddox, a wealthy banker who owns the company that owns the building Kickboxing Academy leases. He informs June that her lease will not be renewed so that Tarbeck can expand his dojo. After a brief conversation, he relents, and informs both instructors that the lease dispute will be settled at the upcoming kickboxing tournament.

Cindy wanders along the beach and finds Danny, whose abusive, alcoholic father has thrown him out. They talk, and he reveals that his desire to no longer fight comes from nearly killing an opponent in a previous tournament. The two share a kiss. Meanwhile, June is on a date with Carl, a lawyer. On their way out of the restaurant, ninjas attempt to assassinate them with Shurikens and Katanas, but June disarms one of the ninjas and fights them off with help from Carl. The two then continue their date.

The next morning June arrives to find Kickboxing Academy vandalized, including a severed mannequin's head hanging from a noose. Later that night Cindy and Danny are on a date at a bar when Chet shows up, drunk. Chet challenges Danny to a fight with a series of improvised weapons, and is defeated. He stumbles out to his red convertible and vomits on the hood as two Fatal Combat students emerge from beneath the car, hiding wire cutters. Chet attempts to drive home, loses control of his car, and realizes the Fatal Combat students have cut his brakes. He crashes into a wall and is hospitalized.

On a date with Carl, June overhears on his answering machine that he is the lawyer handling the acquisition of Kickboxing Academy. She storms out. At the hospital, Cindy visits Chet and receives his blessing to be with Danny. Back at Kickboxing Academy, Danny meets with June. She asks him to participate in the tournament, and when he refuses, she reveals that during her first fight at nine-years-old, her opponent died in the ring. It was later discovered that the boy died of congestive heart failure, but she learned to move on and leave her past in the past, and urges Danny to do the same.

In a secretive call, Maddox informs Tarbeck he will be replacing his top student with a ringer.

The next day, the tournament takes place. Fatal Combat rampantly and obviously cheats with the assistance of Maddox, who is sponsoring the tournament. They have an experienced fighter compete in the "Beginners" match, have a male fighter compete in the "Womans" match, and have their ringer compete in the final match against Danny, who has decided to fight. This results in the tournament being ruled a tie, to be decided by a final match between the instructors, June and Tarbeck.

June defeats Tarbeck easily. Maddox congratulates June and apologizes for holding a grudge, as it is revealed it was his son who died in the ring with June at nine-years-old. As the students of Kickboxing Academy celebrate, Carl announces that he has used Maddox's power of attorney to sign Kickboxing Academy over to himself and plans to turn the whole area into office buildings and an Army/Navy surplus store, run by Tarbeck. It is revealed that Chillmeister, the courier Carl used to deliver the contracts, has deliberately misfiled them and Carl's plan fails. In response to this, Tarbeck fires an assault rifle into the air and attempts to take the crowd hostage. The Fatal Combat students abandon him, and Brian attacks and disarms him, leading to his arrest.

Later, at a celebratory party, the kickboxing academy students discuss their future plan. Cindy leaves the Party and finds Danny on the beach, where the two share a final kiss.

== Cast ==
- Steven Bauer as Carl
- Chyler Leigh as Cindy
- Donna Barnes as June
- David Everett as Brian
- Christopher Khayman Lee as Danny
- Daphnée Duplaix as Melinda
- Eric Miranda as Chet
- Kely McClung as Treck
