= Eli Marienthal =

American actor (born 1986)

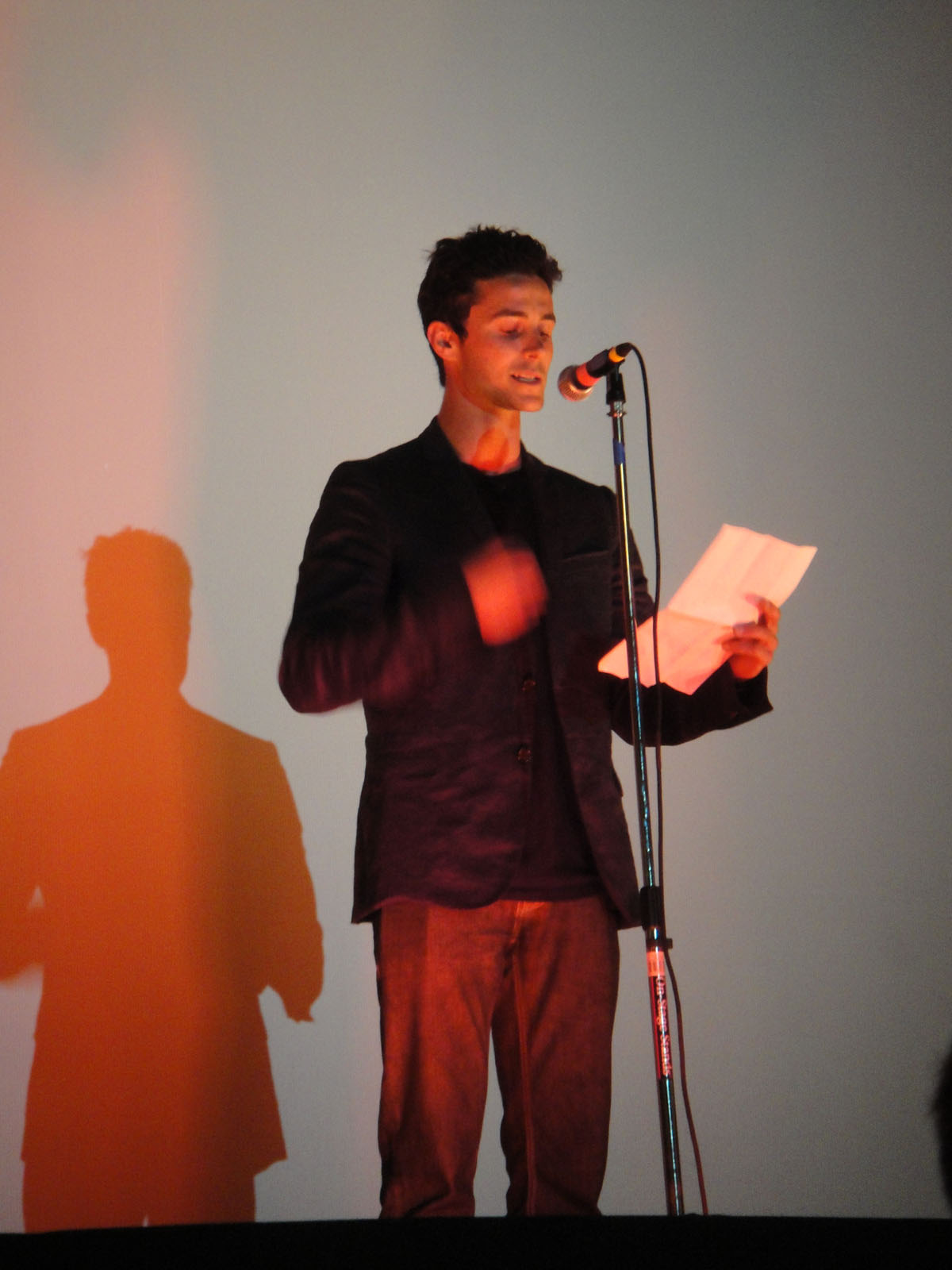
- Marienthal at the LA Animation Festival in March 2012
- Born: Eli David Marienthal; March 6, 1986 (age 40); Santa Monica, California, U.S.
- Occupation: Actor
- Years active: 1996–2019
- Children: 1

Eli David Marienthal (born March 6, 1986) is an American former actor. He won the Annie Award for Outstanding Achievement for Voice Acting in a Feature Production for his vocal performance as Hogarth Hughes in the animated film The Iron Giant (1999).

== Family and personal life ==
Marienthal was born in Santa Monica, California, to Penny Marienthal and Joseph Cross. His older brother Harley and younger sister Flora are also actors. Marienthal is Jewish of German-Jewish and Russian-Jewish descent.

Marienthal graduated from the private East Bay French-American School in Berkeley. As of February 2019, he has a doctorate in geography at the University of California, Berkeley.

== Career ==
Marienthal's career started in Bay Area stage theater work, performing in Missing Persons, The Cryptogram, Hecuba, A Midsummer Night's Dream, Every 17 Minutes the Crowd Goes Crazy, and The Life of Galileo.

He provided the voice of Hogarth Hughes in the 1999 animated film The Iron Giant, which won him an Annie Award for Outstanding Achievement for Voice Acting in a Feature Production.

Marienthal also voiced the character Robin (Tim Drake) in the Static Shock episode "The Big Leagues", and reprised his role in Batman: Mystery of the Batwoman. He played the title role of Tucker Pierce in the Tucker television series, as well as Steve Stifler's brother in American Pie franchise and Sam in Confessions of a Teenage Drama Queen.

== Filmography ==
=== Film ===
Year	Film	Role	Notes
1996	Unlikely Angel	Matthew Bartilson	Television film
1997	First Love, Last Rites	Adrian	
1998	Slums of Beverly Hills	Richard "Rickey" Abromowitz	
1998	Jack Frost	Spencer	
1999	American Pie	Matt Stifler	
1999	The Iron Giant	Hogarth Hughes (voice)	Annie Award for Outstanding Achievement for Voice Acting in a Feature Production
2001	American Pie 2	Matt Stifler	
2002	The Country Bears	Dexter "Dex" Barrington	
2003	Batman: Mystery of the Batwoman	Tim Drake / Robin (voice)	
2004	Confessions of a Teenage Drama Queen	Sam "Samuel"	

=== Television ===
Year	Television series	Role	Notes
2000	Touched by an Angel	John	Episode: "A House Divided"
2000	Batman Beyond	Dak (voice)	Episode: "Where's Terry?"
2000	Tucker	Tucker Pierce	Main role; 10 episodes
2001–2002	The Zeta Project	Young Zee (voice)	2 episodes
2002	Static Shock	Tim Drake / Robin (voice)	Episode: "The Big Leagues"
2003	Fillmore!	Derek Minna, Computerized Stingray (voice)	Episode: "Two Wheels, Full Throttle, No Brakes"
2017–2019	The North Pole	Finn	Web series, 12 episodes
