= Tucker (2000 TV series) =

American sitcom

- Genre: Sitcom
- Created by: Ron Milbauer; Terri Hughes
- Starring: Eli Marienthal; Noelle Beck; Katey Sagal; Nathan Lawrence; Alison Lohman; Casey Sander
- Composer: Mark Mothersbaugh
- Country of origin: United States
- Original language: English
- No. of seasons: 1
- No. of episodes: 10 (6 unaired)

Production
- Executive producers: Terri Hughes; Vic Kaplan; Rick Kellard; Ron Milbauer
- Camera setup: Single-camera
- Running time: 24 minutes
- Production companies: Sudden Entertainment; NBC Studios; Regency Television; 20th Century Fox Television

Original release
- Network: NBC
- Release: October 2 – October 23, 2000

Tucker is an American sitcom created by Ron Milbauer and Terri Hughes, that aired on NBC from October 2 to October 23, 2000. The series starred Eli Marienthal, Noelle Beck, Katey Sagal, Nathan Lawrence, Alison Lohman and Casey Sander, and was produced by Sudden Entertainment, NBC Studios, Regency Television and 20th Century Fox Television.

== Premise ==
Tucker's parents have divorced, and so he is forced to move into his despised aunt Claire's house, with her decidedly calmer airplane pilot husband Jimmy and strange cousin Leon. Originally disappointed at the arrangement, he spots their gorgeous neighbor McKenna. From that point forward, he valiantly attempts to become her boyfriend, competing with Seth Green, who was 26 at the time of shooting, dating the 14 year old girl, who was 21 at the time of shooting.

The series revolves around divorce, teenage culture and an adult's romantic love of a child.

In the UK and Ireland, the show aired on Nickelodeon.

== Cast ==
The main characters of Tucker (from left to right), McKenna, Jeannie, Tucker, Claire, Leon and "Captain" Jimmy.

- Eli Marienthal as Tucker Pierce
- Noelle Beck as Jeannie Pierce, Tucker's mother
- Casey Sander as "Captain" Jimmy Wennick, Tucker's uncle
- Nathan Lawrence as Leon Wennick, Tucker's cousin
- Alison Lohman as McKenna Reid, Tucker's neighbor
- Katey Sagal as Claire Wennick, Tucker's aunt
- Andrew Lawrence as Kenickie Behar

== Episodes ==
No.	Title	Directed by	Written by	Original release date	Prod. code	Viewers (millions)
1	"Pilot"	Allan Arkush	Terri Hughes & Ron Milbauer	October 2, 2000	1022-00-179	8.35
2	"Seth Green with Envy"	Allan Arkush	Terri Hughes & Ron Milbauer	October 9, 2000	07-00-101	6.95
3	"Everybody Dance Now"	Rodman Flender	Sheila R. Lawrence	October 16, 2000	07-00-102	6.74
4	"Big Putts"	Lev L. Spiro	Daniel Joshua Rubin	October 23, 2000	07-00-104	3.87
5	"You Make Me Sick"	Victoria Hochberg	Ira Fritz & Neal Howard	Unaired	07-00-105	N/A
6	"Homewrecker for the Holidays"	James D. Parriott	Terri Hughes & Ron Milbauer	Unaired	07-00-103	N/A
7	"Signed, Sealed and Intercepted"	Lev. L. Spiro	Chuck Tatham	Unaired	07-00-106	N/A
8	"The Eyes of Claire"	David Straiton	Chris Alberghini & Mike Chessler	Unaired	07-00-107	N/A
9	"Kiss and Tell"	Robert Berlinger	Sheila R. Lawrence	Unaired	07-00-108	N/A
10	"A Boob in the Night"	David Straiton	Rick Kellard	Unaired	07-00-110	N/A
11	"Half Pipe, Full Chub"	Michael Lange	Steve Joe & Greg Schaffer	Unaired	07-00-111	N/A
12	"Señor Lyzardo"	Lev L. Spiro	Terri Hughes & Ron Milbauer	Unaired	07-00-112	N/A
13	"A Rottweiler Runs Through It" "The Family Tree"	Lev L. Spiro	Robin Schwartz & Robert Tarlow	Unaired	07-00-109	N/A
Note: This is listed by various media sources under both titles. Though not broadcast nationally, this episode did air unannounced on the West Coast on December 13, 2000, (from 10:00 pm to 10:30 pm) as filler for Al Gore's live concession speech to President George W. Bush.
