= Oh, Grow Up =

American sitcom

- Genre: Sitcom
- Created by: Alan Ball
- Starring: Stephen Dunham; David Alan Basche; John Ducey; Rena Sofer; Niesha Trout
- Composer: Jonathan Wolff
- Country of origin: United States
- Original language: English
- No. of seasons: 1
- No. of episodes: 13 (2 unaired)

Production
- Executive producers: Robert Greenblatt; David Janollari; Alan Ball
- Camera setup: Multi-camera
- Running time: 30 minutes
- Production companies: The Greenblatt/Janollari Studio; Fox Television Studios

Original release
- Network: ABC
- Release: September 22 – December 28, 1999

Oh, Grow Up is an American sitcom that aired on ABC from September 22 to December 28, 1999. Created by Alan Ball, the show was based on his 1991 one-act stage play Bachelor Holiday, written before he found success as a television writer. The series starred Stephen Dunham, David Alan Basche, and John Ducey as three former college roommates who share an apartment in Brooklyn.

== Plot ==
Construction company owner Hunter Franklin and artist Norris Michelsky are old college roommates, who share an apartment in Brooklyn, but are nothing alike. When their other college roommate, attorney Ford Lowell, splits from his wife Suzanne after coming out, Hunter and Norris invite him to move in with them. In addition, ladies man Hunter discovers that an affair from years ago has produced a child, when 18-year-old art student Chloe makes contact with him. In addition, one of the more unique aspects of the show was a dog named Mom, whose barks were subtitled with captions.

== Cast ==
- Stephen Dunham as Hunter Franklin
- David Alan Basche as Norris Michelsky
- John Ducey as Ford Lowell
- Rena Sofer as Suzanne Vandermeer
- Niesha Trout as Chloe Sheffield

=== Recurring ===
- Ken Marino as Sal, Hunter's boss
- Freddy Rodriguez as Deke, Chloe's friends with unrequited feelings for her

=== Notable guest stars ===
- Tom Cavanagh as Bruce ("Love Stinks")
- Wally Kurth as Lewis Morris Jr. ("Clods and Monsters")
- Dan Castellaneta as Sven Jorgensen ("Hunter's Metamorphosis")
- Jack Riley as Harry Tatham ("Himbo")
- Julia Campbell as Julie Sheffield, Chloe's mother ("The Parent Trap: Part I")

== Production ==
The series was based on Ball's experiences in New York City in the early 1990s, before he had found success as a writer on other series such as Grace Under Fire and Cybill. ABC promoted the series as "a comedy for immature audiences", and initially scheduled Oh, Grow Up on Wednesday nights after Top 20 series The Drew Carey Show. The series, which debuted the same week as Ball's critically acclaimed film American Beauty was released, suffered from mixed reviews.

In November 1999, ABC announced that the series would move to Tuesday nights, between hits Spin City and Dharma & Greg. However, just after airing only three episodes in its new time slot, ABC cancelled the series on December 20, 1999, reportedly to make room for Who Wants to Be a Millionaire? on the same night. Only one more episode aired before ABC pulled the series, leaving two of the 13 episodes produced unaired. Despite the cancellation, the series placed at #61 for the overall season, with an average of 10.7 million viewers per week.

== Episodes ==
| No. | Title | Directed by | Written by | Original release date | Prod. code |
|---|---|---|---|---|---|
| 1 | "Pilot" | Andy Cadiff | Alan Ball | September 22, 1999 | 10011-99-179 |
| 2 | "Good Pop, Bad Pop" | Tom Cherones | Alan Ball | September 29, 1999 | 04-99-101 |
Hunter is shocked to discover he has previously had a one-night stand with Chloe's roommate. Meanwhile, Ford's attempts to save Suzanne's job see him cross-dressing, and Norris deals with a client who refuses to pay him.
| 3 | "Love Stinks" | Mark Cendrowski | Maria Brown | October 6, 1999 | 04-99-103 |
Hunter and Norris try to set up Ford on a date, but come to find that guys they believe to be gay are actually straight.
| 4 | "President of the House" | Tom Cherones | Steve Joe & Greg Schaffer | October 13, 1999 | 04-09-102 |
Tiring of Norris' uptight rules, Ford challenges him to run for "President of the House". However, Norris tires of Ford's equally uptight style and becomes jealous when he showcases better leadership than Norris. Hunter is bummed as he struggles to bond with Chloe.
| 5 | "Marathon Men" | Ted Wass | Chris Downey | October 20, 1999 | 04-99-106 |
Norris and Ford become jealous of Hunter's constant good luck. The two convince slothly Hunter to compete against Ford in an upcoming marathon to finally beat him at something. After cleaning some of Ford's things from their house, Suzanne becomes upset that Ford is seemingly unsentimental. She enlists Chloe to help her break into Ford's room and search.
| 6 | "Clods and Monsters" | Ted Wass | Kirk J. Rudell | October 27, 1999 | 04-99-105 |
Hunter is bummed to discover that everyone finds his annual Halloween party to be terrible. He drags Ford out to a gay bar for him to practice his flirting, where discovers his boss Sal is gay. Sal comforts Ford on his lack of charisma. Norris worries when Chloe reveals her plans to attend a wild party. He goes on a wild goose chase to find her with a candy-addicted Suzanne, who dislikes the childish holiday.
| 7 | "Hunter's Metamorphosis" | Tom Cherones | Chuck Tatham | November 3, 1999 | 04-99-107 |
Hunter plans a big party for Chloe to try and make up for all the past birthdays he has missed. However, she becomes very annoyed since it brings up unhappy childhood memories, resulting in a fight between the two. Looking to make some money, Norris agrees to babysit one of Suzanne's clients (Dan Castellaneta), an artist whom he idolizes. However, the artist's eccentricities make the task much more difficult and grueling than he anticipated.
| 8 | "Himbo" | Brian K. Roberts | Rick Nyholm | December 7, 1999 | 04-99-111 |
| 9 | "The Parent Trap: Part 1" | Tom Cherones | Story by : Steve Joe & Greg Schaffer; Teleplay by : Kirk J. Rudell & Maria Brown | December 14, 1999 | 04-99-108 |
| 10 | "The Parent Trap: Part 2" | Steve Zuckerman | Rick Nyholm & Paul Ruehl | December 21, 1999 | 04-99-109 |
| 11 | "Duckboy Flies Again" | Craig Zisk | Jill Condon & Amy Toomin | December 28, 1999 | 04-99-104 |
| 12 | "Goodwill Hunter" | Steve Zuckerman | Paul Ruehl | Unaired | 04-99-110 |
| 13 | "Baby It's Cold Outside" | Andrew Tsao | Chuck Tatham & Chris Downey | Unaired | 04-99-112 |
