= Notes from the Underbelly =

American sitcom

- Genre: Sitcom
- Created by: Stacy Traub
- Starring: Jennifer Westfeldt; Peter Cambor; Michael Weaver; Rachael Harris; Melanie Paxson; Sunkrish Bala
- Music by: Blake Neely
- Country of origin: United States
- Original language: English
- No. of seasons: 2
- No. of episodes: 23

Production
- Camera setup: Single-camera
- Running time: 30 minutes
- Production companies: The Tannenbaum Company; Hill Three Productions; Warner Bros. Television

Original release
- Network: ABC; NTV
- Release: April 12, 2007 – May 19, 2008

Notes from the Underbelly is an American sitcom that was aired on ABC from 2007 to 2008, originally debuting as a mid-season replacement. The series is based on the 2005 novel of the same name by Risa Green, and was produced by Eric and Kim Tannenbaum (previously producing Two and a Half Men) for Warner Bros. Television. The title is a parody of Dostoevsky's novel Notes from Underground.

Originally, it was supposed to debut on October 5, 2006, along with Big Day, but ABC made a last-minute change in its schedule by moving Ugly Betty to Thursday, thus replacing both sitcoms. After numerous scheduling changes prior to the shows premiere, the show premiered Thursday, April 12, 2007, at 10:00PM Eastern/9:00PM Central, and moved to its regular Wednesday timeslot at 8:30PM Eastern/7:30PM Central on April 18.

Notes from the Underbelly began its second season on November 26, 2007, in the new timeslot of 9:30PM Eastern/8:30PM Central on Mondays, leading out of fall's second highest rated freshman sitcom, Samantha Who?.

On May 13, 2008, ABC canceled the series after two seasons.

In Russia, all 23 episodes of the series were shown on NTV.

In late 2025, all 23 episodes began streaming on Tubi. This was the first time the eight unaired episodes aired in the United States.

== Plot ==
The series chronicles the life of Andrew and Lauren, a couple who are expecting their first child, and the unlikely help and advice of their family and friends who also want to share in the couple's joy and pains on the road to parenthood.

== Cast and characters ==
Role	Actor/Actress
Lauren Stone	Jennifer Westfeldt
Andrew Stone	Peter Cambor
Danny	Michael Weaver
Cooper	Rachael Harris
Julie	Melanie Paxson
Eric	Sunkrish Bala

Despite playing parents on the series, the majority of the cast had little real life experience with pregnancy.

== Main crew ==
- Bari Halle
- Livia Hanich
- Stacy Traub
- Barry Sonnenfeld
- Eric Tannenbaum
- Kim Tannenbaum
- Greg Schaffer
- Jana Hunter
- Gary Murphy
- John Quaintance
- Lesley Wake
- Dan Kopelman
- Mitch Hunter
- Steve Joe
- Diane Mercer
- Steve Schaffer
- Russ Woody

== Episodes ==
=== Series overview ===
Season	Episodes	Originally released	
Season	Episodes	First released	Last released
1	8	April 12, 2007	May 16, 2007
2	15	November 26, 2007	May 19, 2008

=== Season 1 (2007) ===
No. overall	No. in season	Title	Directed by	Written by	Original release date	Prod. code	Viewers (millions)
1	1	"Pilot"	Barry Sonnenfeld	Stacy Traub	April 12, 2007	276011	8.34
Andrew and Lauren are deciding if they really want a family or not. But the advice from their friends is not helping them at all! Are they going to have a baby or are they going to continue their lives without one?
2	2	"Animal Style"	Barry Sonnenfeld	Stacy Traub	April 12, 2007	3T5901	8.34
Andrew and Lauren are discovering that changes in their life is inevitable. While Lauren must trade her Mini Cooper for a mini-van, Andrew must get rid of his hockey table. But things are getting complicated for Lauren when she learns that her driver license is expired and that she must do all of her tests all over again.
3	3	"Million Dollar Baby"	Barry Sonnenfeld	Jana Hunter & Mitch Hunter	April 18, 2007	3T5902	6.26
Because of the overwhelming impending costs of having a baby, Andrew looks for a way to save some money... at Lauren's expense. He decides to ask for Danny's help and takes additional landscaping jobs, even if neither are equipped for manual labor. During the meantime, Lauren wonders is she should continue to work or leave her job since he's not getting through to the students she counsels.
4	4	"Oleander"	Michael Patrick Jann	Steve Joe & Greg Schaffer	April 25, 2007	3T5903	4.78
With Lauren pregnant, the couple quickly find out the pros and cons of pregnancy. Lauren's pregnancy gets in the way of the couple when they try to have some intimacy. Meanwhile, Lauren's highly noticeable "pregnancy" breasts attires the attention of the rich students she counsels.
5	5	"Julie & Eric's Baby"	Barry Sonnenfeld	Gary Murphy	May 2, 2007	3T5904	6.00
During a trip to the mall for makeup, Julie's water prematurely breaks. With Eric rushing home from a business trip, Julie ask her friends to be present during the birth. Andrew and Lauren must abruptly abandon their romantic weekend getaway. Danny offers to help by ensuring that their hotel plans don't go to waste.
6	6	"Mother's Milk"	Barry Sonnenfeld	Lesley Wake Webster	May 9, 2007	3T5905	5.70
While Lauren isn't convinced breastfeeding is necessary, Andrew refuses to change his mind and claims that being a breastfed baby is the reason why he is successful today as a Landscaper Architect. Meanwhile, Julie and Eric relation isn't going better and the couple tries to reconnect after the birth of Baby Perry, while Cooper falls for an awesome employee.
7	7	"Keeping Up Appearances"	James Frawley	John Quaintance	May 16, 2007	3T5906	4.56
While Lauren tries to prove to her co-workers, and to herself, that being pregnant won't affect her job. But things don't turn out as planned, and the advice she gave to one of her students put her job in jeopardy. During the meantime, Julie and Cooper realize that they have only on thing in common --Lauren.
8	8	"Surprise"	Victoria Hochberg	Steve Joe & Greg Schaffer	May 16, 2007	3T5909	3.87
Today is Andrew's birthday. Everyone has gathered to celebrate this special day. Even Andrew's old college buddy is there to celebrate. But the only problem is that Andrew doesn't like him at all. Sadly, this day will turn for the worse when some of the biggest secrets are gonna be revealed.

=== Season 2 (2007–08) ===
No. overall	No. in season	Title	Directed by	Written by	Original release date	Prod. code	Viewers (millions)
9	1	"She's Gotta Have It"	Barnet Kellman	Shira Zeltzer Goldman	November 26, 2007	3T5907	7.45
Andrew decides that it's time for him to show more confidence in himself. The experience proves to be a big turn-on for Lauren. But with Andrew getting more and more confident in himself and his abilities, the couple is future threatened. During the meantime, Danny and Cooper are also finding themselves in a strange situation.
10	2	"The Blackout"	Peter Lauer	Aaron Korsh	December 3, 2007	3T5908	5.00
After a power outage, Lauren suddenly becomes paranoid about every little thing and worries that she isn't ready to take care of a baby. Andrew, on the other hand, is feeling very confident about his parenting abilities, until he kills a mock "baby" at their infant CPR class. Meanwhile Andrew's friend, Danny, excels in class by flirting with the 52-year-old-teacher, and Cooper uses Julie's sexy baby blog as a way to bond with the "brown baggers" at her firm.
11	3	"Heather's Visit"	Lev L. Spiro	Gary Murphy	December 10, 2007	3T5910	4.50
When Lauren's cool younger sister, Heather, visits for a job interview, Lauren launches a campaign to convince her to move to Los Angeles. She would love to have Heather nearby when the baby's born, but will her aggressive attempts to sell her sister on LA end up pushing her away? Meanwhile, as Lauren's consumed with her sister's visit, Julie convinces Cooper to keep her company while Eric's away on business. But when new mom Julie falls asleep from exhaustion, Cooper is confronted with one of her greatest fears, a crying baby.
12	4	"Not Without My Noodles"	Barnet Kellman	Mitch Hunter & Jana Hunter	December 17, 2007	3T5911	3.19
Cooper makes a new friend. Andrew agrees to landscape Julie and Eric's garden for baby Perry's official "coming out" party. Danny want to play piano at the party.
13	5	"Friends and Neighbors"	Joanna Kerns	John Quaintance	January 14, 2008	3T6653	4.57
When Lauren and Andrew make an appointment with a lawyer to create their will, they're faced with the important decision of choosing Olivia's legal guardian should anything happen to them. After Julie and Eric turn them down because they're "booked," they decide to ask their neighbors, a couple they hate for being too perfect -- until it dawns on them what great guardians they'd make.
14	6	"If the Shoe Fits"	Barry Sonnenfeld	Lesley Wake Webster	January 21, 2008	3T5912	4.48
It seems everything is beginning to remind Lauren of the weight she's gained in the six months she's been pregnant, leaving her feeling decidedly un-sexy, as Cooper, Julie and Andrew do whatever they can to help her out of her funk. Meanwhile, Danny asks Julie if he can borrow her baby to attract women in the park.
15	7	"The List"	Barnet Kellman	Lesley Wake Webster	February 11, 2008	3T6651	4.15
Lauren enlists Danny's help to surprise Andrew with VIP passes to the big concert festival in Palm Springs. The gesture is meant as a last hurrah gift before the baby arrives and to offer a break from Andrew, who's been overly concerned the baby's about to be born with every grimace and expression of exasperation Lauren makes. Once at the festival, Lauren starts to experience what she thinks is indigestion, which prompts Andrew, when he sees their car is blocked, to commandeer a tour bus to get to the hospital.
16	8	"My Baby's Doctor"	Barnet Kellman	Steve Joe & Greg Schaffer	February 25, 2008 (on NTV)	3T6657 (Note: Two episodes are identified this way onscreen with no 54.)	N/A
17	9	"Baby on Board"	Barnet Kellman	Mitch Hunter & Jana Hunter	March 17, 2008 (on NTV)	3T6652	N/A
18	10	"Odd Man Out"	Barnet Kellman	Russ Woody	April 7, 2008 (on NTV)	3T6655	N/A
19	11	"First Night Out"	Jamie Babbit	Aaron Korsh	April 14, 2008 (on NTV)	3T6656	N/A
20	12	"The Circle of Life"	Barnet Kellman	Dan Kopelman	April 28, 2008 (on NTV)	3T6657	N/A
21	13	"Spinning Out of Control"	Elliot Hegarty	Becky Mann & Audra Sielaff	May 5, 2008 (on NTV)	3T6658	N/A
22	14	"Accidental Family Bed"	Barnet Kellman	Becky Mann & Audra Sielaff	May 12, 2008 (on NTV)	3T6659	N/A
23	15	"The Weekend"	Dennie Gordon	Jana Hunter & Mitch Hunter	May 19, 2008 (on NTV)	3T6660	N/A

== American ratings ==
Seasonal rankings (based on average total viewers per episode) of Notes from the Underbelly on ABC:

Note: Each U.S. network television season starts in late September and ends in late May, or occasionally early June, which coincides with the completion of May sweeps.

Season	Timeslot (EDT)	Season Premiere	Season Finale	TV Season	Rank	Viewers (in millions)	18-49 Rating/Share (rank)
1	Thursday 10:00 P.M. (April 12, 2007) Wednesday 8:30 P.M.(April 18 – May 16, 2007)	April 12, 2007	May 16, 2007	2006–2007	#109	5.5	2.2/6 (#99)
2	Monday 9:30 P.M. (November 26, 2007 – February 11, 2008)	November 26, 2007	February 11, 2008	2007–2008	#112	5.2	1.9/5 (N/A)

- The second season performance is current as of January 20, 2008
