= That '80s Show =

American sitcom

- Genre: Period sitcom
- Created by: Mark Brazill; Terry Turner; Linda Wallem
- Directed by: Terry Hughes; David Trainer (pilot)
- Starring: Glenn Howerton; Tinsley Grimes; Chyler Leigh; Eddie Shin; Brittany Daniel; Margaret Smith; Geoff Pierson
- Opening theme: "Eighties" by Killing Joke
- Composer: Ben Vaughn
- Country of origin: United States
- Original language: English
- No. of seasons: 1
- No. of episodes: 13

Production
- Executive producers: Mark Brazill; Marcy Carsey; Caryn Mandabach; Terry Turner; Linda Wallem; Tom Werner; Christine Zander
- Producers: Patrick Kienlen; Cindy Caponera; Greg Schaffer; Steve Joe
- Cinematography: Ronald W. Browne
- Editors: Vince Humphrey; Timothy Ryder
- Camera setup: Multi-camera
- Running time: 22–24 minutes
- Production company: Carsey-Werner-Mandabach Productions

Original release
- Network: Fox
- Release: January 23 – May 29, 2002

That '80s Show is an American television sitcom set in 1984 that aired from January 23 to May 29, 2002 on Fox. Created in the wake of the successful sitcom That '70s Show, it shared a similar title and even many of the same writers and production staff, but was not actually a spin-off of that series. The show was cancelled after 13 episodes.

== Development ==
Freaks and Geeks, a show that aired on NBC during the 1999–2000 television season, was called That '80s Show by fans and critics for its similarities to That '70s Show. When asked about That '70s Show entering the 1980s, after Fox renewed the show for seasons three and four in December 1999, show creator Mark Brazill said, "We'll have to change the name to That '80s Show."

That '80s Show began development by August 2001, using the same creative team from That '70s Show. Fox wanted to create a spin-off of That '70s Show, but moved ahead with a show about a different decade. In November 2001, Fox announced That '80s Show would premiere on January 23, 2002, as a midseason replacement. In developing the show, executive producer Linda Wallem said, "This show really came out of conversations we had while working on 'That '70s Show.' We were talking about what we had been doing in the '80s and found that we had all been in pretty much the same situation, supporting ourselves with jobs we hated, but really burning to be in show business. But, of course, for most people, the '80s were all about going out and getting your share of the money pie, so our characters are people who constantly are being pulled between their artistic dreams and commercial reality." Wallem, along with Mark Brazill and Terry Turner, created the show, and other executive producers included Marcy Carsey and Tom Werner. The costume designer, Melina Root, who also worked on That '70s Show, researched fashion magazines, merchandising catalogs, and yearbooks from the 1980s to find ideas for clothing the characters on the show could wear.

Stand-up comic Margaret Smith was cast for That '80s Show in October 2001. Fox announced the rest of the cast (Chyler Leigh, Brittany Daniel, Glenn Howerton, Tinsley Grimes, and Eddie Shin) in December 2001. The show cast relatively unknown actors similarly to the cast of That '70s Show. Daniel, who portrayed Sophia in That '80s Show, had a guest starring role on That '70s Show in an episode that aired the day before That 80s Show premiered. She played Eric Forman's cousin Penny in the episode "Eric's Hot Cousin". Howerton and Grimes grew up in Montgomery, Alabama, at the same time, but had not met before being cast as siblings on the show.

=== Broadcast ===
That '80s Show debuted January 23, 2002, and the final episode aired May 29, 2002. Its regular time slot was on Wednesday nights at 8:00/7:00 Central on the Fox Network.

== Plot ==
The show is set in 1984 and revolves around the lives of a group of friends in their 20s living in San Diego, California. The show follows the lives of struggling musician Corey Howard and his associates, friends, and family. His working (and eventual romantic) relationship with June Tuesday is also a focal point, and becomes the main anchor of the show after a few episodes. Later episodes focused on the culture clash between Corey and June's lifestyles. Various tidbits of 1980s culture and music are sprinkled in throughout each episode. As with That '70s Show, several celebrities from the decade guest starred in several episodes.

Episodes took place at different locations throughout the day. Scenes would take place at Club Berlin, a dance club; Permanent Record, the record store where Corey and June worked; Videx, an office owned by R. T.; and the family home, along with the occasional car trip.

The theme song is a 15-second snippet of "Eighties" by Killing Joke, with the opening credit sequence (and screens used to transition from scene to scene) consisting of a hand flipping through a row of vinyl records, each with artwork of a cast member's face and name.

== Cast ==
=== Main ===
- Glenn Howerton as Corey Howard, a struggling musician who lives at home with his sister Katie and his father R. T. Howard, works at Permanent Record, a record store. He also dated Sophia before the start of the series, as they are recently broken up in the pilot. His college major is in philosophy and is not materialistic.
- Tinsley Grimes as Katie Howard, Corey's sister. A Valley Girl and college drop-out turned environmentalist.
- Chyler Leigh as June Tuesday, a punk rock musician who also works at Permanent Record. Leigh said it took about 35 minutes and "nine pounds of hairspray" for her hair stylist to create Tuesday's Liberty spikes hair for each day of filming.
- Eddie Shin as Roger Park, Corey's best friend, a struggling used-car dealer and wannabe yuppie like R. T. He rents a room above the Howard family garage, admires Ronald Reagan and is a dance enthusiast. He looks up to R.T. as a mentor and role model.
- Brittany Daniel as Sophia, Corey's bisexual ex-girlfriend who has an unrequited crush on Corey's sister Katie.
- Margaret Smith as Margaret, an ex-Hippie/Rock Groupie and owner of Permanent Record, the record store where Corey and Tuesday work.
- Geoff Pierson as R. T. Howard, Corey and Katie's divorced father and owner of "Videx", a small company that produces and sells personal fitness equipment such as the Butt Luge and the Gut Wacker.

== Episodes ==
No.	Title	Directed by	Written by	Original release date	Prod. code
1	"Pilot" "That '80s Pilot"	David Trainer	Mark Brazill & Terry Turner & Linda Wallem	January 23, 2002	101
Corey meets Tuesday and does not get along with her, quitting the record store to work for his father, but not before getting the best of her in an insult war. Sophia reveals her crush on Katie. Corey returns to Permanent Record by episode's end, taking Tuesday (who takes her hair down after Corey's insult) out for coffee.
2	"Valentine's Day"	Terry Hughes	Cindy Caponera	January 30, 2002	104
A box of chocolates shows up at Permanent Record, and Margaret tricks both Corey and Tuesday into believing the other bought them as a gift, freaking both of them out in their "non-relationship." Owen comes home from the Navy to visit Katie. R. T. is depressed that he is alone, and the gang takes him to Club Berlin to find him a date.
3	"Tuesday Comes Over"	Terry Hughes	Elaine Aronson	February 6, 2002	103
Tuesday takes a shower at Corey's (without his knowledge) after Katie discovers she is sleeping in her car. In the process, she discovers that Corey lied to her about living on his own. Roger struggles with work at the car dealership. R. T. buys a hot tub. Katie tries to make everyone more environmentally friendly.
4	"Corey's Remix"	Terry Hughes	Terry Turner	February 13, 2002	102
Corey records a song about his breakup from Sophia, and Katie mixes it into a dance song and plays it at the club, much to Corey's chagrin. Roger gets fired from his job at the car dealership. Corey flirts with Tuesday, inviting her to Club Berlin. She blows him off, but feels bad, and shows up at the club anyway at the end of the episode.
5	"My Dead Friend"	Terry Hughes	Christine Zander	February 20, 2002	105
A regular at the club drops dead, and his father mistakenly thinks Corey was his friend, and asks him to give a eulogy at his funeral. Corey finds out that "Tuesday" is actually Tuesday's last name, and her first initial is ‘J'. Roger is obsessed with finding the dead guy's cousin, who owns a lucrative car dealership in Chula Vista, California. Corey does not know what to say, so Tuesday helps him, finally telling him her first name in the process (June) in an effort to get him to trust her. Sophia continues to pursue her crush on Katie, and tries to set up a threesome with the two of them and Owen. A drunk who frequently sells records to Permanent Record unknowingly gives Margaret a copy of the "butcher cover" version of The Beatles' Yesterday and Today album. She does not know whether to keep it or do the right thing and give it back.
6	"Spring Break '84"	Terry Hughes	Steve Joe & Greg Schaffer	March 6, 2002	106
Katie gets into credit card debt, so she plans a fake trip to "Mexico" for Spring Break, which turns out to just be Roger's apartment. R. T. falls apart without Katie's daily guidance. A former high school classmate of Corey's (played by Chyler Leigh's real life husband Nathan West) is now a big pop star, and asks Tuesday to come to his show (and backstage). Corey is depressed at the thought of Tuesday seeing someone else, but in the end Tuesday cannot stand the guy's music. Roger buys a new pair of parachute pants that make it impossible for him to sit down.
7	"Katie's Birthday"	Terry Hughes	Jenna Jolovitz	March 27, 2002	107
Sophia plans a birthday party for Katie, where Owen proposes, much to Katie's embarrassment. R. T. buys a new video camera, but does not know how to operate it. Roger hurts his ankle dancing. Corey and Tuesday finally kiss, after much tension (and arguing), yet still argue at the end of the episode (but almost kiss again). R. T. hires Sophia to be director of sales for Videx.
8	"After The Kiss"	Terry Hughes	Tony Barbieri	April 3, 2002	108
Things heat up between Corey and Tuesday, but she runs away at the thought of a labelled "relationship." Katie invites Roger to her aerobics class, and he shows her up with his dancing. Sophia starts at R. T.'s company, and becomes a power hungry control freak. Tuesday finally comes around, and agrees to date Corey after talking with Margaret.
9	"Double Date"	Terry Hughes	Sarah McLaughlin & Lesley Wake	April 10, 2002	109
Corey and Tuesday go on a date, Roger wants it to be a double date, so Tuesday picks up a random girl that works at the local bank (Tammy Lynn Michaels) for him. R. T. decides to become the spokesperson for his own company, but keeps getting distracted by the women in his commercial. Katie decides to drop out of college, but is afraid to tell her father (she changes her major instead, after running into an old professor). Tuesday becomes frustrated with Corey's uniform lifestyle, but accepts it in the end.
10	"Punk Club"	Terry Hughes	Tiffany Zehnal	April 17, 2002	110
A new punk club opens up in town, and Tuesday secretly goes without informing Corey. Roger burns part of his hair off in the car with a portable crimping iron. Sophia convinces Katie to stop cleaning up the house, which causes R. T. to be unable to take care of himself. Margaret becomes obsessed with Footloose. Corey believes that Tuesday is embarrassed to be seen with him, so Tuesday takes Corey back to the club, defending his "normal" image to everyone. '80s teen star Tiffany guest stars as a punk club employee.
11	"Road Trip"	Terry Hughes	Neil Edwards	April 24, 2002	111
After the two of them perform at a wedding, Katie signs herself and Corey up to be on Star Search. Corey has second thoughts about appearing on a "mainstream" talent show, especially after being through make-up. R. T. takes Sophia to the wedding to show off to his ex-wife, and she moves in, temporarily. Roger meets (and dances for) Ed McMahon, who guest stars. Margaret is scared of seeing Pat Benatar (who guest stars with Neil Giraldo), due to a pyro accident she was responsible for years earlier.
12	"Beach Party"	Terry Hughes	Linda Wallem	May 7, 2002	112
Katie invites the gang to a beach barbecue, but it is just a trick to clean up the beach. Corey's decision to move in with Tuesday freaks her out, and angers Roger. Debbie Gibson guest stars as a record store customer who drives Margaret nuts. R. T. is thinking of selling his company to a competitor, played by guest star Morgan Fairchild. She and Sophia have a Dynasty-like slapping session. Tuesday, in her own way, tells Corey that she loves him, and the series ends with the two of them kissing on the beach.
13	"Sophia's Depressed"	Terry Hughes	Elaine Aronson	May 29, 2002	113
Sophia is depressed because her twin sister, Bianca (Cynthia Daniel), is getting married. R. T. thinks he once slept with Patty, Roger's girlfriend. The record store is damaged due to an electrical fire, and Margaret's friend Zeke (played by Duran Duran's John Taylor) remodels. Owen incorrectly tells everyone on his ship that he and Katie got married, and also is despondent over M*A*S*H ending. Corey, fed up with Tuesday's "pit" of an apartment, asks her to stay at his house, but she is afraid of his family's "happy" lifestyle.

== Reception ==
=== Critical ===
The first episode of That '80s Show received generally negative reviews from television critics. Eric Kohanik of The Calgary Herald lamented that a time period needs to be at least 20 years away to laugh at it, and That '80s Show was created too soon. David Bianculli from The New York Daily News agreed, yet summed up that the show "isn't that bad." Josh Friedman of The Los Angeles Times concluded that the pilot was reminiscent of a school reunion, that "[t]he nostalgic fun is intermittent". Miki Turner from the Fort Worth Star-Telegram criticized the chemistry of the cast and the effectiveness of the writing. Sonia Mansfield from The San Francisco Examiner said the show "is mildly entertaining with a few funny moments", but pointed out that the humor was being pushed by the setting rather than through its characters. In a more negative review, Peggy Curran from The Montreal Gazette said it is "nowhere near as funny or original as it could have been."

In a retrospective column, Tony Atherton of The Ottawa Citizen explained that one of the reasons That '80s Show failed was because the show featured young adults in the 1980s, and those who experienced that decade in their 20s would be in their 40s when the show aired in 2002. He mused that the show targeted viewers in their early 30s, but made their cast of characters too old.

Jen Chaney of Vulture said this series is an example of 1980s nostalgia.

=== Ratings ===
The premiere episode of That '80s Show on January 23, 2002, garnered 11.40 million viewers, placing the show 41st overall for television programs during the week.

Viewership and ratings per episode of That '80s Show
No.	Title	Air date	Timeslot (ET)	Rating/share (18–49)	Viewers (millions)	Ref.
1	"Pilot"	January 23, 2002	Wednesday 8:00 pm	6.2/17	11.40	
2	"Valentine's Day"	January 30, 2002	Wednesday 8:00 pm	—N/a	9.01	
3	"Tuesday Comes Over"	February 6, 2002	Wednesday 8:00 pm	—N/a	5.87	
4	"Corey's Remix"	February 13, 2002	Wednesday 8:00 pm	—N/a	6.93	
5	"My Dead Friend"	February 20, 2002	Wednesday 8:00 pm	—N/a	6.67	
6	"Spring Break '84"	March 6, 2002	Wednesday 8:00 pm	—N/a	7.36	
7	"Katie's Birthday"	March 27, 2002	Wednesday 8:00 pm	—N/a	6.02	
8	"After The Kiss"	April 3, 2002	Wednesday 8:00 pm	—N/a	5.68	
9	"Double Date"	April 10, 2002	Wednesday 8:00 pm	—N/a	5.39	
10	"Punk Club"	April 17, 2002	Wednesday 8:00 pm	—N/a	5.28	
11	"Road Trip"	April 24, 2002	Wednesday 8:00 pm	—N/a	4.95	
12	"Beach Party"	May 7, 2002	Tuesday 8:30 pm	—N/a	6.74	
13	"Sophia's Depressed"	May 29, 2002	Wednesday 8:00 pm	—N/a	5.05	

For the 2001–02 television season, That '80s Show was ranked 104th in average viewership by Nielsen and received 6.8 million average viewers per episode.

== Cancellation ==
That '80s Show failed to gain a wide audience during its original run, and low ratings eventually caused Fox to cancel it after 13 episodes on May 17, 2002, before the final episode aired on May 29.
