= Margaret Smith (comedian) =

American comedian and actress (born 1956)

- Born: 1956 (age 69–70); Chicago, Illinois, U.S.

Comedy career
- Medium: Stand-up comedy, writing, television, film
- Awards: American Comedy; Daytime Emmy

Margaret Smith is an American six-time Emmy Award-winning stand-up comedian, actress, writer and producer. Originally from Chicago, Illinois, Smith is known for her deadpan and often acerbic delivery, reminiscent of Eve Arden. She was a writer and producer for The Ellen DeGeneres Show. Smith lives in Austin, Texas, with her two sons.

== Personal life ==
=== Early life ===
The second youngest of six children, Smith was born in Chicago, Illinois, in 1956 and grew up there for several years before her family relocated to Florida; there she was raised by her mother and stepfather. Smith has been open about growing up in a "dysfunctional family", often using this as the basis for material in her stand-up comedy.

=== Adult life ===
Smith currently lives in Austin, Texas, with her two sons. She has written at length about her unsuccessful attempts with in vitro fertilization for several years before turning to adoption. The story of her becoming a mother is what inspired her first publication: an autobiography about her childhood with her mother and subsequently becoming a mother herself.

Smith has also used her experiences with and support of therapy for her stand-up and book.

== Career ==
=== Stand-up comedy ===
Smith studied improvisational comedy at Second City in Chicago during the late 1970s. After moving to New York City, she found there was no market for improv, and as a result she began performing stand-up in the early 1980s. After overcoming initial stage fright, she still faced a significant struggle as a woman in stand-up comedy. Her biggest break came in 1984 when she was invited to perform on Late Night with David Letterman; she would be invited back an additional six times. She was offered small movie roles, as well as a position opening for George Carlin on tour. Despite these successes, she was still described in papers as an "up and coming comedian" as late as 1988. Her performances into the early 1990s were given more weight, and she was a nominee for Comedian of the Year at the American Comedy Awards.

She has toured the comedy circuit throughout the United States and appeared in Amsterdam, Australia, Ireland and London. She appeared twice at Montreal's Just for Laughs festival.

Smith has produced and starred in her own independent projects, including her CD, As It Should Be. Released in August 2000, it carries a liner note endorsement from Jay Leno: "The best comedians are the ones that write and perform their own material, and Margaret Smith is at the top of that list".

=== Television and film appearances ===
She played Margaret the record store owner in That '80s Show. Her television and film credits include roles in Martin Scorsese's Goodfellas, the remake of The Blob, and the Wachowskis' thriller Bound with Gina Gershon and Jennifer Tilly. She made a guest-star appearance in the Pamela Anderson series VIP.

Smith starred in a special for Comedy Central. Her other television credits include appearances on CNN, PBS, HBO, Fox Network, Showtime, E! Network, and VH-1. She appeared on The Tonight Show with Jay Leno, as well as Late Night with David Letterman.

== Style ==
Smith is most widely known for her frowning, deadpan delivery and low energy performances. Despite this being somewhat of a trademark of her performances, it did not resonate with some critics, who frequently remarked that she seemed bored.

The topics of her comedy have included hating her parents, having a serial divorcee sister, and her experiences in therapy. Her family were her main focus for many years, and Smith attributed to her mother the quote "If you can't say anything nice, become a comedian". Despite this, she always maintained that her comedy would not become mean-spirited; she took a stance to never "gay-bash or woman-bash", in her own words, and sometimes confronted her opening acts if they crossed this line.

== Publications ==
Her first book, What Was I Thinking? How Being a Stand Up Did Nothing to Prepare Me to Become a Single Mother, was published in 2008 by Crossroad Publishing. A reviewer at Book Apex commented:

What Sedaris, Lebowitz and Dave Eggers should aspire to. Margaret Smith is a one-of-a-kind comedian. Her off-kilter worldview and dry-as-dust delivery is fresh and real in a world of grinning comedy clones. My favorite Margaret Smith-ism goes something like "I saw my mother today. (long pause) It's okay, she didn't see me." I'm not always able to catch her on tv like I used to, so I was delighted to hear she'd written a book. The cover says the book's about becoming a mother, but you won't find overly sweet sentimentality here. Smith makes looking on the dark side into an art form. Her story is dark and horrific, and she pulls no punches when writing about violence, abuse, racism, tomatoes and her calling plan. Only Margaret Smith could make comedy of this. But she pulls it off astonishingly well—deftly balancing tragedy and humor. Ultimately, it's not a story about adopting a baby, it's a heartfelt tale of spiritual redemption. I know that doesn't sound very funny, but it really is.

== Filmography ==
Film
Year	Title	Role	Notes
1972	Unholy Rollers	Avenger	
1986	New Wave Comedy	Self	Documentary
1987	Norman's Corner	Lucy	TV Movie
1988	The Blob	Nurse	
1989	Jackée	Margaret Kemp	TV Movie
1990	Goodfellas	School Guard	
1996	Larger Than Life	Colorado State Police Officer	
1996	Bound	Woman Cop	
2000	Rugrats in Paris	Stewardess (Voice)	
2011	Five	Summer	TV Movie

Television
Year	Title	Role	Notes
1983	American Playhouse	Club El Guacho Patron	
1987	Comedy Club	Self	
1987	The 11th Annual Young Comedians	Self	
1989	227	Margaret Kemp	
1992	The A-List	Self	Episode: #1.15 Episode: #1.59
1992–1994	An Evening at the Improv	Self	Episode: #9.18 Episode: #12.2 Episode: #15.25
1992–1998	The Tonight Show with Jay Leno	Self	Episode: #1.98 Episode: #1.101 Episode: #2.25 Episode: #6.59
1995–1999	Late Night with Conan O'Brien	Self	Episode: "Al Roker/Kevin McDonald/Margaret Smith" Episode: "Fabio/Margaret Smith/Ming-Na Wen" Episode "John Leguizamo/Tom Green/Margaret Smith"
1995	Bob Hope's Young Comedians	Self	TV Special
1996	The Rosie O'Donnell Show	Self	Episode: October 8, 1996
1997	Dr. Katz, Professional Therapist	Margaret / Writer	Episode: "Mourning Person"
1998	The Roseanne Show	Woman in Audience (Uncredited)	Episode: #1.6
1998	The Roseanne Show	Writer	Episode: #1.33
1998	Make Me Laugh	Self	Episode: "Alex, Jonathan, Zakia"
1999	Comedy Central Presents	Self (Comedian) / Writer	Episode: "Margaret Smith"
2000	The Panel	Self	Episode #3.5
2000	The Big Schmooze	Self	Episode #1.2
2001	Rocket Power	Delivery Woman (Voice)	Episode: "Losers Weepers/Reggie the Movie"
2002	V.I.P.	Besty Goldman	Episode: "True Val Story"
2002	That '80s Show	Margaret	Episode: "Pilot" Episode: "Valentine's Day" Episode: "Tuesday Comes Over" Episode: "Corey's Remix" Episode: "My Dead Friend" Episode: "Spring Break '84" Episode: "Katie's Birthday" Episode: "After the Kiss" Episode: "Double Date" Episode: "Punk Club" Episode: "Road Trip" Episode: "Beach Party" Episode: "Sophia's Depressed"
2006–2007	The Ellen DeGeneres Show	Writer / Producer	Episode: October 16, 2006 Episode: January 5, 2007 Episode: February 1, 2007 Episode: May 14, 2007

Stand-up Specials
Year	Title	Role	Notes
2000	As It Should Be	Self	Audio CD

== Awards ==
American Comedy Awards
Year	Category	Work	Result
1995	Funniest Female Stand-Up Comic		Won

Daytime Emmy Awards
Year	Category	Work	Result
2005	Outstanding Talk Show	The Ellen DeGeneres Show	Won
2005	Outstanding Special Class Writing	The Ellen DeGeneres Show	Won
2006	Outstanding Talk Show	The Ellen DeGeneres Show	Won
2006	Outstanding Special Class Writing	The Ellen DeGeneres Show	Won
2007	Outstanding Talk Show	The Ellen DeGeneres Show	Won
2007	Outstanding Special Class Writing	The Ellen DeGeneres Show	Won
2008	Outstanding Talk Show / Entertainment	The Ellen DeGeneres Show	Nominated
2008	Outstanding Special Class Writing	The Ellen DeGeneres Show	Nominated
