= Nathan West =

American actor, musician and singer (born 1978)

- Born: September 29, 1978 (age 47); Anchorage, Alaska, U.S.
- Occupations: Actor; musician; singer
- Years active: 1994–present
- Spouse: Chyler Leigh (m. 2002; div. 2025)
- Children: 3
- Musical career
- Also known as: WestLeigh (with Chyler Leigh); East of Eli
- Instruments: Vocals; guitar

Nathan Luke West (born September 29, 1978) is an American actor, musician, and singer.

== Early life and education ==
West was born and raised in Anchorage, Alaska. He graduated from Service High School in Anchorage, where he played hockey.

== Career ==
In 2000 West worked on the television series 7th Heaven with his now wife Chyler Leigh, playing Mary Camden's (Jessica Biel) troubled friends Johnny and Frankie.

West has had roles in major films as well as independent projects, including such films as Disney’s Miracle and the award winning independent feature Alleged. Not only an actor he has also worked as a producer, his projects including IFC’s Brake.

West is also a singer-songwriter, drawing his musical inspiration from the likes of Van Morrison, Bob Dylan and Otis Redding.

West also makes music with his wife Chyler Leigh, under the name "WestLeigh". They have performed covers as well as written an original song called "Love Lit The Sky".

== Personal life ==
West played major junior ice hockey with the Detroit Whalers of the Ontario Hockey League.

While at an audition for a couple for the pilot of an unsuccessful WB series titled Saving Graces, West met Chyler Leigh. They have worked on many projects with each other since, usually portraying couples, including 7th Heaven and Safe Harbor. When on the set of Not Another Teen Movie, West proposed to Leigh. The couple married on July 20, 2002, in Alaska. Leigh and West have three children: Noah Wilde West (born December 2003), Taelyn Leigh West (born September 2006), and Anniston Kae West (born May 7, 2009).

Leigh has said that she and West have a pact in which the person who guesses the baby's sex correctly gets to choose the name. When pregnant with Noah, Leigh guessed she was having a boy so she chose the first name and West gave him his middle name. For Taelyn, West correctly guessed it was a girl, so he named her. Their third child, also a girl, was guessed correctly by West.

West is a Christian. West and his family live in Tennessee.

== Filmography ==
=== Film ===
Year	Title	Role	Notes
1994	D2: The Mighty Ducks	Iceland Goalie	
2000	Bring It On	Jan	
2001	Not Another Teen Movie	Actor	
2002	The Skulls II	Parker Neal	Video
2002	Home Room	James	
2004	Miracle	Rob McClanahan	
2008	Forever Strong	Quentin	
2010	Alleged	Charles B. Anderson	

=== Television ===
Year	Title	Role	Notes
1998	The Practice	James Parrish	"Reasons to Believe", "Trench Work"
1998	The Adventures of A.R.K.	Sam	
1999	ER	Justin Casey	"Responsible Parties"
1999	Smart Guy	Paul	"Never Too Young"
1999	Chicago Hope	Robert Devaney	"The Heart to Heart"
1999	Safe Harbor	Tommy Bullock	"Boys Will Be Boys"
1999	Saving Graces	Brendan	TV film
2000	Get Real	Carter	"Absolution"
2000–2001	7th Heaven	Johnny	Recurring role
2002	That '80s Show	Wray Thorn	"Spring Break '84"
2002	Glory Days	Conrad Jarrett	"There Goes the Neighborhood"
2002	Boomtown	Zack Berman	"The David McNorris Show"
2002	Septuplets	Jackson Wilde	
2009	Bones	Ed Fralic	"Fire in the Ice"
2009	Grey's Anatomy	Mike	"Holidaze"
