= Casey Sander =

American actor (born 1956)

- Born: Clinton O. Sander; July 6, 1955 (age 71); Washington, D.C., U.S.
- Education: Nathan Hale High School
- Alma mater: University of Puget Sound
- Occupation: Actor
- Years active: 1982–present
- Children: 2

Clinton O. "Casey" Sander (born July 6, 1955) is an American actor whose roles include "Captain" Jimmy Wennick on the short-lived TV series Tucker, Bernadette's father, Mike on The Big Bang Theory and Roger Hollister in four episodes of The Ranch.

== Early life ==
Sander was born in Washington, D.C. His father was an Air Force lieutenant colonel. While attending Nathan Hale High School in Seattle, Washington, as sophomore, he played shortstop on the school's baseball team.

In his senior year, he was a 10th round draft pick for the California Angels and was accepted after he graduated from high school in 1973. Though he had turned down football scholarships from Washington and Washington State University, he had an unsuccessful season with the Angels and was eventually released. Sander and Richard Karn attended the same junior high school in Seattle and played against each other on their respective high schools’ football teams. After being released from the Angels and playing one season for the Seattle Rainiers, he accepted a football scholarship from University of Puget Sound. He considered becoming a sports broadcaster and took up an acting class in hopes it would help his performance. He participated in college plays including Waiting for Godot. After earning a teaching degree, he briefly taught at Curtis Senior High School in University Place, Washington. After quitting, he drove to Los Angeles and worked as a shipyard hand, log-cabin builder, bartender and car dealer to get by before getting an acting agent.

== Acting career ==
Sander's first significant work was in print advertising including being the "Winston man" for Winston Cigarettes. His television credits include appearances on Dallas, Falcon Crest, Dynasty, Who's the Boss?, Punky Brewster, Magnum, P.I., The Golden Girls, Knots Landing, Hunter, Step by Step, The Fresh Prince of Bel-Air, Malcolm in the Middle, JAG, Buffy the Vampire Slayer, NCIS, Mad Men, Rules of Engagement, Sons of Anarchy, Criminal Minds, Marvin Marvin, Silicon Valley, NCIS: Los Angeles, The Newsroom, and Grey's Anatomy, among other shows. His film roles include Body Double (1984), Moving Violations (1985), Stewardess School (1986), Dragnet (1987), Punchline (1988), Predator 2 (1990), Wild Orchid II: Two Shades of Blue (1991), The Shaggy Dog (2006), and Vice (2018).

From 1991 to 1999, Sander played the role of Rock Flanagan (of K&B Construction) on the sitcom Home Improvement. From 1993 to 1998, he played Wade, the neighbor on Grace Under Fire. From 2000 to 2001, he played "Captain" Jimmy Wennick on the short-lived TV series Tucker. From 2012 to 2015, he played Bernadette's father, Mike on The Big Bang Theory. From 2019 to 2020, he portrayed Roger Hollister in four episodes of The Ranch. In 2020, Sander appeared as a guest on the Studio 60 on the Sunset Strip marathon fundraiser episode of The George Lucas Talk Show.

== Personal life ==
Sander has a son, Max, and a daughter, Mimi.

== Selected filmography ==
- 1982 Long Run as Bob
- 1984 Body Double as Man #2 In 'Holly Does Hollywood'
- 1985 Moving Violations as Cop With Joan
- 1986 Who's the Boss? as Josh Brady
- 1986 Stewardess School as Dudley
- 1986 Ratboy as Stagehand
- 1987 Dragnet as Phoney CHP #1
- 1988 Punchline as Ernie, The Bartender
- 1987 Golden Girls as Sven Lindstrom (Season 3, Episode 9 - A visit from little Sven)
- 1989 Knots Landing as Malcolm Manning (Season 10, Episodes 17, 18, 19)
- 1990 Space Invaders as Radio Announcer
- 1990 Predator 2 as Federal Team #1
- 1991 Wild Orchid II: Two Shades of Blue as Captain Edwards
- 2006 16 Blocks as Captain Dan Gruber
- 2006 The Shaggy Dog as Leader
- 2006 Penny Dreadful as Truck Driver
- 2007 The Comebacks as Clint
- 2010 Crazy on the Outside as Prison Guard
- 2010 Sons of Anarchy as Lead Sheriff
- 2011 Heaven's Rain as Captain Larsen
- 2012 Criminal Minds as Detective Childers
- 2014 The Newsroom as Judge Cedarman
- 2015 Castle as Billy O'Rourke
- 2015 Grey's Anatomy as Casey
- 2017 It's Always Sunny in Philadelphia as Group Leader
- 2022 Mythic Quest as Grandpop
