= Greg Schaffer =

American television producer and writer

- Occupation(s): Television producer and writer
- Years active: 1998–present

Greg Schaffer is an American television producer and writer.

His producing and writing credits include Mad About You; The Tracy Morgan Show; Rodney; That '70s Show; Notes from the Underbelly; True Jackson, VP; Oh, Grow Up; Tucker and produced and wrote for That '80s Show. Much of his work prior to the second season of True Jackson, VP was with fellow writer and producer Steve Joe; they parted ways in 2009. He and his brother, Jeff Schaffer, grew up in Warren, Ohio.

He is the creator of Brews Brothers, a Netflix sitcom.
