= Rodney (TV series) =

American sitcom

- Genre: Sitcom
- Created by: Don Reo; Damon Wayans; Ric Swartzlander
- Starring: Rodney Carrington; Jennifer Aspen; Amy Pietz; Nick Searcy; Oliver Davis; Matthew Josten; Jon Reep; Mac Davis
- Composer: Steve Dorff
- Country of origin: United States
- Original language: English
- No. of seasons: 2
- No. of episodes: 44

Production
- Executive producers: Ric Swartzlander; David Himelfarb; Michael Goldstein; Don Reo; Damon Wayans
- Producer: Rodney Carrington
- Running time: 30 minutes
- Production companies: Rude Mood Productions; Himmel Films; Touchstone Television

Original release
- Network: ABC
- Release: September 21, 2004 – June 6, 2006

Rodney is an American television sitcom starring stand-up comic and country music singer Rodney Carrington that aired on ABC from September 21, 2004, to June 6, 2006. Executive producer Ric Swartzlander, Don Reo, and Damon Wayans were the creators of the series.

== Premise ==
The show's story revolves around the character Rodney Hamilton (Rodney Carrington) who wishes to leave his horrible job in Tulsa, Oklahoma, to become a stand-up comedian.

Rodney's daily life revolves around his family – his wife Trina (Jennifer Aspen) and his sons Jack (Oliver Davis) and Bo (Matthew Josten). He also spends a lot of time with his best friend Barry Martin (Nick Searcy) who constantly tries to escape his wife Genie, and with his flighty sister-in-law Charlie (Amy Pietz).

One recurring character is Trina's father, Carl (Mac Davis), who is constantly lending or giving the family money, much to Rodney's dismay.

Another recurring character is police officer Gerald Bob (Jon Reep), who has a sexual relationship with Charlie.

== Cast and characters ==
=== Main characters ===
- Rodney Hamilton (Rodney Carrington)
- Trina Hamilton (Jennifer Aspen) – Rodney's wife
- Barry (Nick Searcy) – Rodney's friend
- Jack Hamilton (Oliver Davis) – Rodney's son
- Bo Hamilton (Matthew Josten) – Rodney's son
- Charlie (Amy Pietz) – Trina's sister

=== Recurring characters ===
- Gerald Bob (Jon Reep) – local law enforcement officer
- Carl (Mac Davis) – Trina's father

== Episodes ==
=== Series overview ===
Season	Episodes	Originally released	
Season	Episodes	First released	Last released
1	22	September 21, 2004	April 26, 2005
2	22	October 4, 2005	June 6, 2006

=== Season 1 (2004–05) ===
No. overall	No. in season	Title	Directed by	Written by	Original release date	Prod. code	Viewers (millions)
1	1	"Pilot"	Robert Berlinger	Story by : Don Reo & Damon Wayans & Ric Swartzlander; Teleplay by : Ric Swartzlander	September 21, 2004	101	9.92
2	2	"Superhero"	Robert Berlinger	Gayle Abrams	September 28, 2004	103	9.27
3	3	"Teacher"	Robert Berlinger	Bob Myer	October 12, 2004	106	8.83
4	4	"Reacquisition Engineer"	Robert Berlinger	Steve Joe & Greg Schaffer	October 19, 2004	105	8.93
5	5	"Halloween"	Robert Berlinger	Jim Gerkin	October 26, 2004	107	10.05
6	6	"Rodney's Mom"	Robert Berlinger	Don Woodard	November 9, 2004	108	8.67
7	7	"Keep on Truckin'"	Robert Berlinger	Phil Baker and Drew Vaupen	November 16, 2004	109	10.13
8	8	"Thanksgiving"	Robert Berlinger	Gayle Abrams	November 23, 2004	110	10.48
9	9	"Dream Lover"	Robert Berlinger	Bob Myer	November 30, 2004	111	10.06
10	10	"It's Up, It's Good"	Robert Berlinger	Steve Joe & Greg Schaffer	December 7, 2004	112	9.94
11	11	"Talent Show"	Gil Junger	Maisha Closson & Jim Gerkin	January 11, 2005	113	9.75
12	12	"Charity Ball"	John Whitesell	Phil Baker & Drew Vaupen	January 18, 2005	114	7.55
13	13	"Sorry Charlie"	Robert Berlinger	Maisha Closson	January 25, 2005	104	9.75
14	14	"Hell Week"	John Whitesell	Mark Gross	February 1, 2005	115	9.54
15	15	"Tassels"	Gail Mancuso	Steve Joe & Greg Schaffer	February 8, 2005	116	9.01
16	16	"The Ring"	Gail Mancuso	Gayle Abrams	February 15, 2005	117	8.79
17	17	"Rodney's Affair"	Shelley Jensen	Reid Harrison	March 22, 2005	118	7.82
18	18	"We Day"	Robert Berlinger	Phil Baker & Drew Vaupen	March 29, 2005	102	8.56
19	19	"Rodney Takes a Ship"	Gil Junger	Mark Kunerth	April 5, 2005	119	7.75
20	20	"Rodney Moonlights"	Sean Mulcahy	Jim Reynolds	April 12, 2005	120	8.05
21	21	"Rodney Gets Robbed"	Gil Junger	David Baldy & Maisha Closson	April 19, 2005	121	8.18
22	22	"Rodney's Big Shot"	Gail Mancuso	Glenn Ellis & Daniel Hsia & Craig Peters	April 26, 2005	122	8.14

=== Season 2 (2005–06) ===
No. overall	No. in season	Title	Directed by	Written by	Original release date	Prod. code	Viewers (millions)
23	1	"To Hell and Back"	Gil Junger	Mike Larsen	October 4, 2005	201	7.49
24	2	"Question Mark Hamilton"	Shelley Jensen	Gayle Abrams	October 11, 2005	203	7.98
25	3	"Who's the Man?"	Shelley Jensen	Mark Gross	October 18, 2005	204	7.62
26	4	"Halloween and Javier"	Gil Junger	Maisha Closson	November 1, 2005	205	7.17
27	5	"Keith"	Gil Junger	Don Woodard	November 8, 2005	206	7.50
28	6	"Rodney Comes Out"	Gil Junger	David Sacks	November 29, 2005	208	7.88
29	7	"O Christmas Tree"	Shelley Jensen	Phil Baker & Drew Vaupen	December 20, 2005	209	7.52
30	8	"The Sleepover"	Shelley Jensen	Glenn Ellis	January 10, 2006	210	7.23
31	9	"Welcome Ho"	Gil Junger	Phil Baker & Drew Vaupen	January 17, 2006	202	4.60
32	10	"A Tisket, A Casket"	Shelley Jessen	Maisha Closson	January 24, 2006	212	5.52
33	11	"When Rodney Comes Marching Home"	Sean Mulcahy	Mike Larsen	February 7, 2006	213	5.94
34	12	"Love is in the Air"	Shelley Jensen	Phil Baker & Drew Vaupen	February 14, 2006	217	4.61
35	13	"Rodney Gets a Leg Up"	Gil Junger	Jim Gerkin	February 21, 2006	207	6.07
36	14	"Where the Rubber Meets the Road"	Sean Mulcahy	Ed Brown	February 28, 2006	214	5.45
37	15	"Celebrity"	Gil Junger	Mark Gross & Jim Gerkin	May 30, 2006	218	4.89
38	16	"The Best Little Pie Shop in Tulsa"	Shelley Jensen	Glenn Ellis & Ed Brown	June 6, 2006	221	4.22
39	17	"Rodney's Biggest Fan"	Shelley Jessen	Jim Gerkin & Mark Gross	Unaired	211	N/A
40	18	"Waiting for Himelfarb"	Shelley Jessen	David Sacks & Don Woodard	Unaired	215	N/A
41	19	"Tulsa, Florida"	Gil Junger	Samantha Silver & Jayme Petrille	Unaired	216	N/A
42	20	"Hot Tub Blues"	Shelley Jensen	Don Woodard & David Sacks	Unaired	219	N/A
43	21	"Potty Mouth"	Shelley Jessen	Mike Larsen	Unaired	220	N/A
44	22	"Finale"	Gil Junger	Gayle Abrams & Ric Swartzlander	Unaired	222	N/A

== Broadcast history ==
Other than in the US, the show also began broadcasting in the UK on ABC1 on May 31, 2005, in Australia on the Seven Network on August 17, 2006, and in the Netherlands on June 9, 2008. The final six episodes were not aired in the United States, however they were shown in Australia on the Seven network in October 2006 and on ABC1 in the UK (before that channel closed in 2007). In Poland it premiered on Comedy Central Family (former VH1) on May 14, 2011.

=== American ratings ===
Season		Episodes	Premiere	Season finale	U.S. ratings
1	2004–2005	22	September 21, 2004	April 26, 2005	9.0 million (56th place)
2	2005–2006	22 (6 unaired)	October 4, 2005	June 6, 2006	6.6 million (93rd place)

== Home media ==
Season 1 of the series was released exclusively to Wal-Mart on May 5, 2009. The set included all 22 episodes and presented in widescreen. The second and final season DVD-Box was released on October 6, 2009, and includes all 22 episodes, even those not aired by ABC.
