= Steve Joe =

Television producer and writer

- Occupations: Television producer and writer
- Years active: 1998–present

Steve Joe is a Chinese-American television producer and writer.

He began his career as a staff writer on the sitcom Veronica's Closet in 1997, later becoming a story editor on Mad About You going on to write the episode "Win a Free Car" in 1999. His producing and writing credits include The Tracy Morgan Show, Rodney, That '70s Show, Notes from the Underbelly, True Jackson, VP, Hot in Cleveland, Oh, Grow Up, Tucker and That '80s Show. Much of his work prior to the second season of True Jackson, VP was with fellow writer and producer Greg Schaffer; they parted ways in 2009.
