= Safe Harbor (1999 TV series) =

American drama television series

- Genre: Drama
- Created by: Brenda Hampton
- Written by: Brenda Hampton; Chris Olsen; Jeff Olsen; Sue Tenney
- Directed by: Burt Brinckerhoff; Chip Chalmers; Joel J. Feigenbaum
- Starring: Gregory Harrison; Rue McClanahan; Christopher Khayman Lee; Jamie Williams; Jeremy Lelliott; Orlando Brown; Chyler Leigh; Deborah Magdalena; Anthony Hubert
- Composer: Kevin Kiner
- Country of origin: United States
- Original language: English
- No. of seasons: 1
- No. of episodes: 10

Production
- Executive producers: Brenda Hampton; Aaron Spelling; E. Duke Vincent
- Producers: Ron Darian; Peter Dunne; S. Bryan Hickox; Catherine LePard; Lore Kimbrough; Sue Tenney; Chris Olsen; Jeff Olsen
- Camera setup: Film; Single-camera
- Running time: 60 minutes
- Production company: Spelling Television

Original release
- Network: The WB
- Release: September 20 – November 28, 1999

Safe Harbor is an American drama television series produced by Spelling Television that aired on The WB from September 20 to November 28, 1999. The series was created and executive produced by Brenda Hampton, who at the time was best known for work on the fellow WB series 7th Heaven, the series was paired with 7th Heaven on the network's Monday night lineup. Despite 7th Heaven being the No. 1 show on The WB during the 1999–2000 season, Safe Harbor was unable to hold a solid audience after 7th Heaven and was canceled after ten episodes and one season with the show moving to Sunday nights where the last two episodes aired.

== Premise ==
John Loring (Gregory Harrison) is the sheriff of a local Florida town named Magic Beach. He is a widower who has his hands full finding the truth behind his wife's death and raising his three sons Hayden (Christopher Khayman Lee), Turner (Jeremy Lelliott) and Jeff (Jamie Williams). Jeff is best friends with Chris (Orlando Brown) and Jamie (Chyler Leigh) is a runaway that John cares for. Helping John raise his kids is his eccentric mother Grandma Loring (Rue McClanahan) who runs the local beach-side motel.

== Cast ==
- Gregory Harrison as Sheriff John Loring
- Rue McClanahan as Grandma Loring
- Christopher Khayman Lee as Hayden Loring
- Jeremy Lelliott as Turner Loring
- Jamie Williams as Jeff Loring
- Orlando Brown as Chris
- Chyler Leigh as Jamie Martin
- Deborah Magdalena as Deputy Lopez
- Anthony Hubert as Deputy Chafin

== Episodes ==
No.	Title	Directed by	Written by	Original release date
1	"One More Time: The Great Escape"	Burt Brinckerhoff	Unknown	September 20, 1999
2	"Can't Touch That"	Harvey Laidman	Unknown	September 27, 1999
3	"Dog Day Afternoons and Nights"	Harvey Laidman	Elaine Arata	October 4, 1999
4	"By Any Means Necessary"	Joel J. Feigenbaum	Sue Tenney	October 11, 1999
5	"Older Women, Younger Men"	Charles Correll	Kathleen Garrity	October 18, 1999
6	"Life Insurance"	Joel J. Feigenbaum	Catherine LePard	November 1, 1999
7	"The Invasion"	Chip Chalmers	Ron Darian; Brenda Hampton	November 8, 1999
8	"The Un-Thanksgiving Show"	Kevin Inch	Elaine Arata	November 15, 1999
9	"One for the Road"	Les Sheldon	Chris Olsen & Jeff Olsen	November 21, 1999
10	"Boys Will Be Boys"	Tony Mordente	Brenda Hampton	November 28, 1999
