= David M. Israel =

American actor

David Michael Israel is an Emmy and Golden Globe award-winning television producer and writer as well as a former sportscaster for the New York Mets. ("Before moving to Los Angeles from New York, Israel was a writer, producer and editor for Major League Baseball, working on such projects as This Week in Baseball, the 1986 New York Mets Highlight Film, and several World Series Highlight Films."). He has worked on The Tracy Morgan Show, 3rd Rock from the Sun, Grounded for Life and the Nickelodeon sitcom How to Rock and Dynasty (2017 TV series). He was a writer and co-executive producer on the NBC show About a Boy.

In 2005, Israel and his partner Jim O'Doherty were signed to a two-year development deal with NBCUniversal.

== Education ==
He is a 1980 graduate of George W. Hewlett High School in Hewlett, New York and a 1984 graduate of Syracuse University.

== Career ==
- MARVIN MARVIN NICKELODEON CONSULTANT/CONSULTING PRODUCER COMPLETED 2012-2013
