= Jim O'Doherty =

American television producer, writer, and actor

- Born: 1959 (age 66–67)
- Occupations: Actor, television producer, writer
- Years active: 1989–present

Jim O'Doherty (born 1959) is an American television producer, writer and actor.

== Career ==
As a television producer and writer he is best known for his work on the sitcoms Grounded for Life and 3rd Rock from the Sun. He was nominated for a Primetime Emmy Award for his work on the latter series, as a part of the producing and writing team.

O'Doherty's other television credits include Out of the Blue, The Tracy Morgan Show and Brothers, as well as the sitcoms Kickin' It and How to Rock, in which he is credited as creator for both series. He has collaborated with fellow producer and writer David M. Israel on the series 3rd Rock from the Sun, Grounded for Life, The Tracy Morgan Show and Brothers.

As an actor, O'Doherty has had small roles in the television series Married... with Children, That '70s Show, 3rd Rock from the Sun, Grounded for Life, and Kickin' It, as well as appearing in the films Megaville (1990) and Basket Case 3: The Progeny (1992).

Prior to acting, O'Doherty started his career in the entertainment industry as a stand-up comedian. He also worked as an audience warm-up man for numerous TV sitcoms...including Unhappily Ever After, Suddenly Susan and Married... with Children.

== Filmography ==
=== Film ===
Year	Title	Work			Note
Year	Title	Director	Writer	Executive producer	Note
2006	Grand Union	No	Yes	Yes	Television Film
2010	Inside Out	Yes	Yes	Yes	Short film

=== Television ===
Year	Title	Work					Note
Year	Title	Creator	Showrunner	Director	Writer	Executive producer	Note
1996-2001	3rd Rock from the Sun	No	No	No	Yes (Note: 12 episodes)	Yes (Note: 3 episodes)	
2001-2005	Grounded for Life	No	No	No	Yes (Note: 4 episodes)	Yes (Note: 62 episodes)	
2003-2004	The Tracy Morgan Show	No	No	No	Yes (Note: 18 episodes)	No	
2011-2015	Kickin' It	Yes	Yes	Yes (Note: 3 episodes)	Yes	Yes	
2012	How to Rock	Yes	No	No	Yes	Yes	
2016-2017	Gamer's Guide to Pretty Much Everything	No	No	Yes (Note: 2 episodes)	Yes (Note: 6 episodes)	Yes	
2019-2021	Studio C	No	Yes	Yes (Note: 22 episodes)	No	Yes	

== Awards and nominations ==
Award	Year	Category	Work	Result
Primetime Emmy Awards	1998	Outstanding Comedy Series	3rd Rock from the Sun	Nominated
