= Normal, Ohio =

American television sitcom

- Created by: Bonnie Turner and Terry Turner; Bob Kushell
- Starring: John Goodman; Joely Fisher; Anita Gillette; Orson Bean; Mo Gaffney; Charles Rocket
- Composers: Ben Vaughn; Jeff Sudakin
- Country of origin: United States
- Original language: English
- No. of seasons: 1
- No. of episodes: 12 (7 aired, 5 unaired episodes) + 1 unaired original alternative pilot

Production
- Executive producers: Marcy Carsey; Caryn Mandabach; Tom Werner
- Camera setup: Multi-camera
- Running time: 30 minutes
- Production companies: Bonter Productions; Carsey-Werner Company

Original release
- Network: Fox
- Release: November 1 – December 13, 2000

Normal, Ohio is an American television sitcom aired on Fox from November 1 to December 13, 2000. The show stars John Goodman as William "Butch" Gamble, a gay man returning to his Midwestern home town. The cast also includes Joely Fisher, Anita Gillette, Orson Bean, Mo Gaffney and Charles Rocket. The title is a reference to Sherwood Anderson's Winesburg, Ohio.

== Overview ==
The original concept for the series was an Odd Couple–style situation comedy called Don't Ask, with Goodman as "Rex", sharing his West Hollywood apartment with college friend David (Anthony LaPaglia). Although the pilot was well-received, creators Bonnie and Terry Turner felt that the premise was not strong enough for an ongoing series. LaPaglia's character was written out and the series was relocated to Ohio.

The show was most notable for the divisions it exposed regarding American culture's view of homosexuality. Gamble is an average blue collar bear-type gay man, with many traits typical of American masculinity, including a love of football and beer, and very few of the traits stereotypically associated with gay men. Nevertheless, his sexuality itself was signified in part by isolated moments of more stereotypically gay behavior, such as singing snippets of Broadway show tunes and helping his sister to color her hair, that were seemingly at odds with the way his character was presented most of the time. As a result, some media outlets dismissed Goodman's role as unrealistic.

Goodman won the People's Choice Award for Best Actor in a New Comedy Series, but up against the second half hour of Who Wants to Be a Millionaire?, it flopped in the Nielsen ratings. Twelve episodes of the series were made, but only seven were aired before its cancellation.

Goodman appeared on the cover of TV Guide's 2000 Fall Preview issue, along with three other actors starring in new sitcoms: Geena Davis, Bette Midler and Michael Richards. The magazine proclaimed them a "fab foursome", but none of the shows were a hit. (In the 2001 Fall Preview issue, the 2000 cover was re-printed with thought balloons over the actors' heads, with Goodman's saying, "Even I didn't buy me as a gay dad!")

== Cast ==
- John Goodman as William "Butch" Gamble
- Anita Gillette as Joan Gamble
- Joely Fisher as Pamela Gamble-Miller
- Greg Pitts as Charlie Gamble
- Julia McIlvaine as Kimberly Miller
- Cody Kasch as Robbie Miller
- Orson Bean as Bill Gamble
- Mo Gaffney as Elizabeth
- Charles Rocket as Danny

== Episodes ==
No.	Title	Directed by	Written by	Original release date	Prod. code
1	"Homecoming Queen"	Philip Charles MacKenzie	Bonnie Turner and Terry Turner & Bob Kushell	November 1, 2000	101
2	"Foreign Affairs"	Phillip Charles MacKenzie	Gregg Mettler	November 8, 2000	104
3	"Caught on Tape"	Phillip Charles MacKenzie	Jimmy Aleck & Jim Keily	November 15, 2000	106
4	"A Thanksgiving Episode"	Phillip Charles MacKenzie	Miriam Trogdon	November 22, 2000	102
5	"Buyer's Remorse"	Phillip Charles MacKenzie	Brad Walsh & Paul Corrigan	November 29, 2000	103
6	"Working Girl"	Phillip Charles MacKenzie	Lynnie Greene & Richard Levine	December 6, 2000	108
7	"Just Another Normal Christmas"	Phillip Charles MacKenzie	John Schwab	December 13, 2000	107
8	"Pamela's New Boyfriend"	Phillip Charles MacKenzie	Bob Nickman	Unaired	105
9	"Forgotten, But Not Gone"	Philip Charles MacKenzie	Brad Walsh & Paul Corrigan	Unaired	109
10	"The Favorite"	Phillip Charles MacKenzie	Kira Arne	Unaired	110
11	"He Always Get His Man"	Phillip Charles MacKenzie	Gregg Mettler	Unaired	111
12	"Charlie's Gamble"	Phillip Charles MacKenzie	Jimmy Aleck & Jim Keily	Unaired	112
0	"Don't Ask (Unaired Alternative Pilot)"	David Trainer	Bonnie Turner and Terry Turner	Unaired	TBA
