= Top-rated United States television programs of 1989–90 =

This table displays the top-rated primetime television series of the 1989–90 season as measured by Nielsen Media Research.

Rank	Program	Network	Rating
1	The Cosby Show	NBC	23.1
1	Roseanne	ABC	23.1
3	Cheers	NBC	22.7
4	A Different World	NBC	21.1
5	America's Funniest Home Videos	ABC	20.9
6	The Golden Girls	NBC	20.1
7	60 Minutes	CBS	19.7
8	The Wonder Years	ABC	19.2
9	Empty Nest	NBC	18.9
10	Monday Night Football	ABC	18.1
11	Unsolved Mysteries	NBC	18.0
12	Who's the Boss?	ABC	17.9
13	Murder, She Wrote	CBS	17.7
13	Chicken Soup	ABC	17.7
15	Grand	NBC	17.6
16	L.A. Law	NBC	17.4
17	Dear John	NBC	17.2
18	Coach	ABC	17.0
19	In the Heat of the Night	NBC	16.9
20	Matlock	NBC	16.6
21	Growing Pains	ABC	15.4
22	Full House	ABC	15.3
22	Designing Women	CBS	15.3
24	CBS Sunday Movie	CBS	14.9
24	Hunter	NBC	14.9
26	Head of the Class	ABC	14.8
27	Murphy Brown	CBS	14.7
28	The Simpsons	FOX	14.5
28	Night Court	NBC	14.5
28	Doogie Howser, M.D.	ABC	14.5
