= The Scholar (TV series) =

- Starring: Rob Nelson
- Country of origin: United States
- Original language: English

Production
- Executive producers: Marcy Carsey; Tom Werner
- Production company: The Carsey-Werner Company

Original release
- Network: ABC
- Release: 2005

The Scholar is a reality television show broadcast by ABC.

Filmed at the University of Southern California, The Scholar is the first reality television show to offer college scholarships as prizes. Ten high-achieving high school seniors compete for a full scholarship to the university of their choice in a competition that tests their skills in academics, leadership, school spirit and community service. The contestants were Amari, Alyssa, Davis, Elizabeth, Jeremy, Melissa, Milana, Scot, Gerald, and Max.

The series premiere aired on June 6, 2005. The first season ended on July 18, 2005. Additional information needed

== Show information ==
- First Episode—The students competed first individually in a quiz about space history to determine who would be the captains. Jeremy and Davis won, and were given the opportunity to choose teams of five for a series of brain teasers. Davis' team won, so he was guaranteed a spot in the challenge on 19th and 20th century literature; the scholarship committee also chose Jeremy and Melissa, and Melissa won this challenge, advancing to the semi-final round and automatically earning fifty thousand towards her education.
- Second Episode—The students competed first individually in a quiz about art history to determine who would be the captains. Liz and Melissa won, and were given the opportunity to choose teams of five in a school spirit competition. Melissa's team won; since she already had a semi-final spot, she chose Max to take her place. The scholarship committee also chose Scot and Gerald, and homeschooler Scot won this challenge, advancing to the semi-final round and automatically earning fifty thousand towards his education.
- Third Episode—The students competed first individually in a word puzzle to determine who would be the captains. Milana and Max won, and were given the opportunity to choose teams of five in a community service competition. Milana's team won, so she was guaranteed a spot in the challenge on African geography; the scholarship committee also chose Liz and Amari, but Milana won this challenge, advancing to the semi-final round and automatically earning fifty thousand towards her education. At this point, Alyssa is the only student who has not been chosen to participate in a final challenge, and she is deeply upset about it. In a confessional, we see her wondering why she was even chosen.
- Fourth Episode—The students competed first individually to put together a map of the United States to determine who would be the captains. Liz and Davis won, and were given the opportunity to choose teams of five in a movie-making competition. Each team had ten hours to write, shoot, and edit a two-minute short film based around a quote. Davis' team won, and a twenty-day trip to Europe was won by every member of that team. Davis was also guaranteed a spot in the challenge on American History from 1770 to 1815; the scholarship committee also chose Liz and Amari, and Liz won this challenge, advancing to the semi-final round and automatically earning fifty thousand towards her education. The major subplot in this episode involved a love triangle between Melissa, Max, and Alyssa; Max's favorable treatment of Alyssa angers Melissa, who feels that she was the first one to have a relationship with Max.
- Fifth Episode—The six students who had not yet advanced to the semi-finals competed individually in a quiz on the Bill of Rights. Davis and Amari won, and were given the opportunity to choose teams of three in a debate about same-sex marriage. While all of the students agreed with the idea of same-sex marriage, Amari, Jeremy, and Alyssa were forced to argue against it. Davis' team, the pro side, won, so he was guaranteed a spot in the challenge on American presidents. Every other student was also asked to study, and the two other contestants, Amari and Alyssa, were announced at the challenge. Amari won this challenge, advancing to the semi-final round and automatically earning fifty thousand towards her education.
- Sixth Episode (Final)-- The five semi-finalists are asked three questions to winnow the field to three, namely Scot, Melissa, and Amari. These three gave speeches to the scholarship committee along with mentors from back home and students from the house. Melissa was chosen as 'The Scholar' and won the full ride scholarship to the university of her choice, namely Pomona College.
