= Chicken Soup (TV series) =

- Genre: Sitcom
- Created by: Saul Turteltaub; Bernie Orenstein
- Written by: Paul Perlove
- Directed by: Terry Hughes; Alan Rafkin
- Starring: Jackie Mason; Lynn Redgrave; Rita Karin; Kathryn Erbe; Johnny Pinto; Alisan Porter; Brandon Maggart; Cathy Lind Hayes
- Composer: Gordon Lustig
- Country of origin: United States
- Original language: English
- No. of seasons: 1
- No. of episodes: 12 (4 unaired)

Production
- Executive producers: Saul Turteltaub; Bernie Orenstein; Marcy Carsey; Tom Werner; Jackie Mason
- Producers: Gayle S. Maffeo; Faye Oshima Belyeu
- Camera setup: Multi-camera
- Running time: 30 minutes
- Production company: Carsey-Werner Company

Original release
- Network: ABC
- Release: September 12 – November 7, 1989

Chicken Soup is an American sitcom starring Jackie Mason and Lynn Redgrave. It aired on ABC from September 12 to November 7, 1989.

== Premise ==
The series focuses on the interfaith relationship of a middle-aged Jewish man, Jackie (Mason), and an Irish Catholic woman, Maddie (Redgrave). Episodes centered around humorous situations and obstacles caused by the couple's different religions.

== Cast ==
- Jackie Mason as Jackie Fisher
- Lynn Redgrave as Maddie Peerce
- Rita Karin as Bea Fisher
- Kathryn Erbe as Patricia Peerce
- Johnny Pinto as Donnie Peerce
- Alisan Porter as Molly Peerce
- Brandon Maggart as Mike Donovan
- Cathy Lind Hayes as Barbara Donovan

== Episodes ==
No.	Title	Directed by	Written by	Original release date	U.S. viewers (millions)
1	"Pilot"	Terry Hughes	Saul Turteltaub; Bernie Orenstein	September 12, 1989	31.0
Jackie Fisher and Maddie Peerce meet and fall in love. The catch: Jackie is Jewish and Maddie is Irish Catholic.
2	"The Dinner"	Alan Rafkin	Paul Perlove	September 19, 1989	27.4
Jackie and Maddie meet some friends for a dinner full of mishaps; Donnie and Patricia are sure that the couple is doomed.
3	"The Bartender"	Alan Rafkin	David Pollock & Elias Davis	September 26, 1989	28.6
Jackie must play bartender when Maddie throws a girls-only party and the bartender fails to show up.
4	"The Reservation"	Alan Rafkin	Saul Turteltaub; Bernie Orenstein	October 3, 1989	27.7
Maddie and Jackie have problems at their favorite restaurant when neither makes a reservation.
5	"Double Date"	Alan Rafkin	Terri Collins & Bruce Reid Schaefer	October 10, 1989	27.8
Maddie and Jackie set their best friends up with each other and take them on a double date.
6	"Take My Kids, Please"	Alan Rafkin	Jerry Ross	October 24, 1989	24.3
After hearing her brother tell racist jokes, Maddie decides to make Jackie the godfather of her children.
7	"Bea Moves Out"	Alan Rafkin	Saul Turteltaub; Bernie Orenstein	October 31, 1989	23.3
Bea wants to be on her own and moves out of Jackie's apartment.
8	"Almost Father Jackie"	Alan Rafkin	Sam Denoff & Marc Sheffler	November 7, 1989	22.4
Bea is upset that Jackie doesn't always act like a father.
9	"The Ralph Hearns Story"	Alan Rafkin	Manny Basanese	Unaired	N/A
10	"Operation Jackie"	Alan Rafkin	N/A	Unaired	N/A
Maddie is concerned when she learns that Jackie needs surgery.
11	"Bea's Night Out"	Alan Rafkin	N/A	Unaired	N/A
Jackie stays up all night waiting and worrying when Bea doesn't come home.
12	"Community Service"	Alan Rafkin	Paul Perlove	Unaired	N/A
Bea is sentenced to community service for her role in a school prank.

== Controversy and cancellation ==
Chicken Soup was scheduled after the #1 primetime series Roseanne, but was canceled because it could not hold a large-enough percentage of the audience from its lead-in and because of controversy over inflammatory remarks by Mason during the New York City Mayoral elections.
