= Grand (TV series) =

American sitcom, originally aired on NBC in 1990

- Genre: Sitcom
- Created by: Michael Leeson
- Country of origin: United States
- Original language: English
- No. of seasons: 2
- No. of episodes: 26 (1 unaired)

Production
- Executive producers: Michael Leeson; Marcy Carsey; Tom Werner
- Producer: Pamela Reed
- Camera setup: Multi-camera
- Running time: 30 minutes
- Production company: Carsey-Werner Company

Original release
- Network: NBC
- Release: January 18 – December 27, 1990

Grand is an American sitcom and soap opera parody that aired on NBC from January 18 to December 27, 1990. It was created by Michael Leeson and executive produced by Leeson, Marcy Carsey and Tom Werner.

Grand revolved around three interrelated families from different social classes – the wealthy Weldons, the impoverished Pasettis, and the middle class Smithsons – who lived in the fictional rural town of Grand, Pennsylvania. The show was a satire that featured story arcs which carried through several episodes, and mocked soap opera conventions in the vein of Soap.

== Series overview ==
Pamela Reed starred as Janice Pasetti, a former homecoming queen living in a trailer with her daughter Edda (Sara Rue), while working as a housekeeper for the Weldons, the wealthiest family in town. Harris Weldon (John Randolph) is the family's patriarch and owner of Grand Piano Works, a piano factory starting to fall on hard times due to foreign keyboard imports. Also living in the Weldon mansion were Harris' dimwitted son, Norris (Joel Murray) and his acerbic butler, Desmond (John Neville), whom Harris kept despite his acid tongue as he had once been responsible for saving his life.

Janice also worked for Harris' niece Carol Ann Smithson (Bonnie Hunt), who lived a middle class life with her ambitious husband Tom (Michael McKean), who always attempting to get an executive position at the factory. Janice also spent her time fending off the advances of Wayne Kazmurski (Andrew Lauer), a motorcycle cop.

Grand ran for two shortened seasons in 1990, with thirteen episodes from January to April, and twelve more from October to December, with one left unaired. The first season follows Harris' attempts to secure a date to a ceremony honoring him at Carnegie Hall, Tom's attempts to hide from Carol Ann his teenaged son from a previous marriage, and Harris allowing Desmond to believe that he was actually Norris' father, although Harris knew it was not true. By the time production began on the first-season finale, NBC had still not committed to another season. Believing the show would be cancelled, the finale was entitled "Blow Off," an apparent stab at NBC's indecision regarding the show. The episode concluded with the town of Grand being devastated by a tornado and the disappearance of the entire cast, save for Wayne.

However, the show's ratings, finishing 15th among mid-season shows, proved high enough for NBC to renew the show and given the prized Thursday 9:30 p.m. slot. But by the time executives made their decision, at least two cast members (Michael McKean and Andrew Lauer) and several members of the production had already committed to other projects. This took the show in a dramatically different direction, with the first episode dealing with what became of Janice's trailer rather than answering questions about the characters who had disappeared. The second episode wrote out Michael McKean's character offscreen, making him an illegal alien who had stolen $50,000 from a Texas Savings and Loan and used the tornado as a means to disappear when the FBI began to close in on him. Andrew Lauer's characters, along with all recurring cast members and their storylines (with the exception of Pamela's ex-husband Eddie, played by Ed Marinaro) were dropped with no explanation.

The pseudo-soap opera format was then abandoned, followed by standard, stand-alone situation comedy episodes, and ratings steadily declined. The soap opera aspect was revived in the final four episodes, but instead of relatable storylines about class relations, the arcs were more outrageous and improbable, involving witchcraft, gangsters, a possible corporate takeover of the piano factory and Carol Ann's decision to adopt a teenager who was raised by wolves. The show was then cancelled, with its final episode left unaired.

== Cast and characters ==
- Pamela Reed as Janice Pasetti
- Michael McKean as Tom Smithson (s. 1)
- Bonnie Hunt as Carol Ann Weldon Smithson
- Andrew Lauer as Wayne Kazmurski (s. 1)
- John Neville as Desmond
- Joel Murray as Norris Weldon
- Sara Rue as Edda Pasetti
- John Randolph as Harris Weldon

== Episodes ==
=== Series overview ===
| Season | Episodes | Originally released | | Rank | Rating |
| Season | Episodes | First released | Last released | Rank | Rating |
|---|---|---|---|---|---|
| 1 | 13 | January 18, 1990 | April 12, 1990 | 15 | 17.6 |
| 2 | 13 (Note: Only twelve of the thirteen episodes produced for season 2 were broadcast.) | October 4, 1990 | December 27, 1990 | 25 | 14.6 |

=== Season 1 (1990) ===
| No. overall | No. in season | Title | Directed by | Written by | Original release date | Viewers (millions) |
|---|---|---|---|---|---|---|
| 1 | 1 | "A Tale of One City" | Peter H. Hunt | Michael Leeson | January 18, 1990 | 32.3 |
| 2 | 2 | "The Pretty Good Mother" | Peter H. Hunt | Carol Gray | January 25, 1990 | 29.3 |
| 3 | 3 | "Sex, Lies & Cable TV" | Peter H. Hunt | Frank Mula | February 1, 1990 | 27.2 |
| 4 | 4 | "A Boy and His Dad" | Peter H. Hunt | Michael Leeson | February 8, 1990 | 26.2 |
| 5 | 5 | "Faded Genes" | Peter H. Hunt | Ira Steven Behr | February 15, 1990 | 25.3 |
| 6 | 6 | "Legends of Sport" | Peter H. Hunt | Grace McKeaney | February 22, 1990 | 26.7 |
| 7 | 7 | "Deer Hunter" | Peter H. Hunt | David Richardson | March 1, 1990 | 24.4 |
| 8 | 8 | "The Bald, the Blond and the Dead" | Peter H. Hunt | Frank Mula | March 8, 1990 | 23.7 |
| 9 | 9 | "Carnegie Hell" | Peter H. Hunt | Carol Gray | March 15, 1990 | 23.2 |
| 10 | 10 | "An Obtuse Triangle" | Peter H. Hunt | David Richardson | March 22, 1990 | 22.6 |
| 11 | 11 | "Trigonometry Made Easy" | Peter H. Hunt | David Richardson | March 29, 1990 | 26.0 |
| 12 | 12 | "Czech, Please!" | Peter H. Hunt | Marc Flanagan | April 5, 1990 | 23.8 |
| 13 | 13 | "Blow Off" | Peter H. Hunt | Jordan Crittenden | April 12, 1990 | 23.1 |

=== Season 2 (1990) ===
| No. overall | No. in season | Title | Directed by | Written by | Original release date | Viewers (millions) |
|---|---|---|---|---|---|---|
| 14 | 1 | "Janice Steals Home" | Art Wolff | Michael Leeson | October 4, 1990 | 21.9 |
| 15 | 2 | "The Chickens Come Home to Roost" | Art Wolff | Frank Mula | October 11, 1990 | 22.7 |
| 16 | 3 | "The Healing" | Art Wolff | Carol Gary | October 18, 1990 | 24.3 |
| 17 | 4 | "The Return of Yale Pinhaus" | Art Wolff | Marvin Braverman & Mike Langworthy | October 25, 1990 | 21.7 |
| 18 | 5 | "Desmond's Mother" | Art Wolff | David Richardson | November 1, 1990 | 22.1 |
| 19 | 6 | "Norris' Romance" | Art Wolff | Frank Mula | November 15, 1990 | 22.4 |
| 20 | 7 | "Roamers and Rumors" | Art Wolff | Carol Gray & David Richardson | November 22, 1990 | 18.7 |
| 21 | 8 | "Lady Luck" | Art Wolff | Mike Scully | November 29, 1990 | 21.1 |
| 22 | 9 | "One Way Out" | Art Wolff | David Richardson | December 6, 1990 | 21.5 |
| 23 | 10 | "The Mother Load" | Art Wolff | Ron Bloomberg | December 13, 1990 | 22.6 |
| 24 | 11 | "Wolf Boy" | Art Wolff | Frank Mula | December 20, 1990 | 20.6 |
| 25 | 12 | "The Well" | Art Wolff | Dale McRaven | December 27, 1990 | 18.0 |
| 26 | 13 | "The End of the World (As We Know It)" | Art Wolff | David Richardson | Unaired | N/A |
