= The Carsey-Werner Company =

American television production company

The Carsey-Werner Company, LLC
- Formerly: Carsey Productions (1981)
- Type: Private
- Industry: Film production Television production
- Founded: March 15, 1981; 45 years ago
- Founders: Marcy Carsey; Tom Werner
- Headquarters: Encino, California, United States
- Website: www.carseywerner.com

The Carsey-Werner Company (previously known as Carsey-Werner Productions and Carsey-Werner-Mandabach Productions, before that, Carsey Productions and also known as Carsey-Werner Television) is an independent production company founded in 1981 by former ABC writer/producer duo Marcy Carsey and Tom Werner (now co-owner of the Boston Red Sox baseball franchise and Liverpool F.C.). Caryn Mandabach was made a partner in the firm in 2001 (she joined in 1984), but left in 2004 to embark on her own production deal.

The company first started when Marcy Carsey left ABC in 1980 to form out Carsey Productions to develop TV shows. Tom Werner succeeded Carsey, but she persuaded him to join her to form an independent production company.

In the early 1990s, Carsey-Werner expanded to game show IPs. The company first bought out the You Bet Your Life IP from NBC in 1991, then the I've Got a Secret IP from Mark Goodson Productions in 1992.

Carsey-Werner has had its own production and, since the early 1990s, distribution arms. Prior to controlling their own distribution, Viacom, and later Paramount Domestic Television, syndicated their programming for them. Carsey-Werner announced that they would buy back the rights to the three shows previously held by Viacom in 1994.

In 1995, the company ventured into feature film production by launching Carsey-Werner Moving Pictures (later Carsey-Werner Films). In 2002 they announced a deal with Paramount Pictures to develop feature films through the studio. The group was also an original partner in Oxygen before Oxygen Media's sale in 2007 to NBCUniversal.

In 2004, Carsey and Werner mulled over the prospect of selling the studio, including its profitable catalog of shows, with UBS as their underwriter. Companies, most notably Viacom and Time Warner, expressed interest in buying the firm to exhibit their content on their cable networks. But the deal did not materialize and Carsey-Werner remained independent. In 2005, Carsey and Werner broke their ties, and Carsey sold off its interest in the production division to Mosaic Media Group, which became an affiliated production company of Warner Bros. Television under the moniker Werner/Gold/Miller. Werner took full control in 2007 by rebranding it to Werner Entertainment, which then partnered with Sara Gilbert's Gilbert TV to form a joint venture, Sara+Tom, following the success of The Conners. The distribution arm continued to use the Carsey-Werner name.

Since then, they have mostly focused on distributing their existing shows, with the 2018 revival of Roseanne and its spin-off The Conners being among the first shows they have produced in more than 10 years. Werner also launched a revival of You Bet Your Life (of which Carsey-Werner had produced a short-lived revival of in the early 1990s) in conjunction with Fox Corporation in 2021.

== Stuart Glickman: CEO ==
A key addition to the Carsey-Werner management team was Stuart Glickman, who became chief executive officer in 1987. Originally a trial lawyer, Glickman became involved in the entertainment industry in 1968 when he became Assistant Counsel for American International Pictures. In 1970 he became director of business affairs for CBS Television. Glickman then worked as an entertainment lawyer for 15 years, providing legal and business advice to top companies and talents, including Carsey-Werner. After becoming the CEO, Glickman expanded on the company's production success with a mandate to create a diversified, global entertainment company with multiple revenue streams. He oversaw the creation of a distribution operation, reacquiring Carsey-Werner's library of shows from Paramount/Viacom, then brokered a number of innovative syndication deals. He helped to create Carsey-Werner Moving Pictures, to position the company to produce feature films. According to Variety, Glickman helped turn Carsey-Werner into a "tiny powerhouse."

The fortune of Carsey-Werner's core business, in the meantime, was mixed in 2000. The company's attempt to break into animation, God, the Devil and Bob, was pulled from NBC after only four episodes, unable to compete opposite ABC's hit quiz show Who Wants to Be a Millionaire. The company did add a major new star, however, when it announced in May that Steve Martin had signed a production deal. Perhaps most important of all to Carsey-Werner's future may have been the announcement in June that its CEO of 13 years, Stuart Glickman, would be leaving the company to "explore new business and investment opportunities." The company's fall production plans had just been concluded, with the return to network television of That '70s Show and 3rd Rock from the Sun, plus the addition of a new comedy, Don't Ask. "I wanted to wait for an orderly time when all things were done," Glickman explained to Variety, adding: "I feel like I'm leaving the company in good shape." Glickman also agreed to help in the search for his replacement.

== Television productions ==
=== Series ===
- Oh Madeline (1983–84)-ABC
- The Cosby Show (1984–92)-NBC
- A Different World (1987–93)-NBC
- Roseanne (1988–97; 2018)-ABC
- Chicken Soup (1989)-ABC
- Grand (1990)-NBC
- Davis Rules (1991–92)-ABC/CBS
- Frannie's Turn (1992)-CBS
- You Bet Your Life (1992–93; 2021–23)-First-run syndication
- Grace Under Fire (1993–98)-ABC
- She TV (1994)
- Cybill (1995–98)-CBS
- Townies (1996)-ABC
- Men Behaving Badly (1996–97)-NBC
- Cosby (1996–2000)-CBS
- 3rd Rock from the Sun (1996–2001)-NBC
- Damon (1998)-FOX
- That '70s Show(1998–2006)-FOX
- God, the Devil and Bob (2000; 2011)-FOX
- Normal, Ohio (2000)-FOX
- Dot Comedy (2000)-ABC
- You Don't Know Jack (2001)-ABC
- Grounded for Life (2001-05)-FOX
- That '80s Show (2002)-FOX
- The Tracy Morgan Show (2003–04)-NBC
- Whoopi (2003–04)-NBC
- Game Over (2004)-UPN
- Good Girls Don't (2004)-Oxygen
- The Scholar (2005)-ABC
- That '90s Show (2023–24)-Netflix
- A Different World (2026–)-Netflix

=== Specials ===
- Callahan (1982)
- Single Bars, Single Women (1984)
- Carol, Whoopi, Carl & Robin (1987)
- The Cosby Outtakes Show (1990)
- The Brett Butler Special (1993)

=== Stephen J. Cannell library ===
On January 24, 2006, Carsey-Werner acquired the distribution rights to Stephen J. Cannell's library. It was originally owned by 20th Century Fox Television when News Corporation acquired New World Communications in 1997. Cannell then reacquired his library back from Fox on May 4, 1998. The library includes 21 Jump Street, The Greatest American Hero and Silk Stalkings. Shout! Factory acquired the Cannell library in March 2020.

=== DVD distribution ===
In 2004, the company announced licensing deals with 20th Century Fox, Anchor Bay Entertainment and Urban Works to distribute several of its television series to DVD. These were the first releases for the home entertainment market since a limited edition of The Cosby Show was permitted to be distributed by Columbia House.

In 2005/2006, Carsey-Werner was flooded with angry letters from fans of The Cosby Show and Roseanne, complaining about edited episodes. Carsey-Werner Distribution eventually decided that seasons 2 of The Cosby Show and Roseanne would be released with uncut shows. Roseanne was decided after John Goodman and Roseanne Barr appeared on Larry King Live and a fan called in, asking why Season 1's DVDs contained edited episodes. Barr and Goodman did not know about the editing, but Barr said she would talk to the producers. It has apparently worked, as there has been no evidence of editing on the Season 2, 3, and 4 sets.

In 2006, the company signed a deal with Magna Entertainment to release The Cosby Show and Roseanne on DVD in Australia.

On May 4, 2011, Mill Creek Entertainment announced that they had signed a deal with Carsey-Werner Productions to re-release 3rd Rock from the Sun, Grounded for Life, Roseanne and That '70s Show on DVD in Region 1.

As of 2011, the following Carsey-Werner series have been released on DVD:

- 3rd Rock from the Sun: Anchor Bay Entertainment (Region 1), Mill Creek Entertainment (Region 1), Network (Region 2), Beyond Home Entertainment (Region 4)
- A Different World: Urban Works (Season 1 only) (Region 1)
- Cybill: First Look Studios (Best-of) (Region 1), Anchor Bay Entertainment (Region 2), Beyond Home Entertainment (Region 4)
- The Cosby Show: Urban Works/First Look Studios (Region 1), Universal Playback (Region 2), Magna Entertainment (Region 4)
- God, the Devil and Bob: 20th Century Fox (Region 1)
- Grounded for Life: Anchor Bay Entertainment (Region 1), Brightspark (Season 1 only) (Region 2), Visual Entertainment (Region 4)
- Roseanne: Anchor Bay Entertainment (Region 1), Mill Creek Entertainment (Region 1), Magna Entertainment (Region 4)
- That '70s Show: 20th Century Fox (Regions 1, 2 & 4), Mill Creek Entertainment (Region 1)

=== Internet ===
Several Carsey-Werner shows were made available on Netflix's Watch Instantly beginning in February 2011, including Roseanne, That '70s Show, The Cosby Show, & 3rd Rock from the Sun. However, in February 2012, Roseanne, The Cosby Show and 3rd Rock from the Sun were taken off instant streaming. Since then, selections of Roseanne and all of 3rd Rock from the Sun have been added back. That '70s Show was taken off Netflix on September 7, 2020, due to ending of the distribution contract.

=== Controversy ===
In 2017, Carsey-Werner sued the BBC over possible copyright infringement for using audiovisual clips from The Cosby Show in a documentary called Bill Cosby – Fall of an American Icon that aired on June 5, 2017, on the BBC.

=== Remasters ===
In March 2013, Carsey-Werner announced it was remastering That '70s Show, 3rd Rock from the Sun, Roseanne, Grounded for Life, A Different World and The Cosby Show into 16:9 high-definition.

== Films ==
In November 2006, the company released its first film for Universal Studios, a comedy film called Let's Go to Prison. A second film, The Brothers Solomon was released with Revolution Studios on September 7, 2007. In 2008, a third film, Smother was released.

- Let's Go to Prison (2006, distributed by Universal Pictures)
- The Brothers Solomon (2007, distributed by Revolution Studios and TriStar Pictures)
- Smother (2008, distributed by Variance Films and Screen Media)
