= Rita Karin =

American actress

- Born: Rita Karpinowicz; October 24, 1919; Wilno, Poland (now Vilnius, Lithuania)
- Died: September 10, 1993 (aged 73); New York City, New York, U.S.
- Occupation: Actress
- Spouse(s): Norbert Horowitz; 2 children
- Parent(s): Moses Karpinowicz and Rachel Levitan

Rita Karin (born Rita Karpinowicz; October 24, 1919 – September 10, 1993) was a Polish-born American actress best known for her role as Jackie Mason's mother on the 1989 TV series Chicken Soup. She also appeared as Meryl Streep's Brooklyn landlady who appears at the beginning of Sophie's Choice. Her voice can be heard singing children's songs from the camps in the Holocaust Museum in Washington, D.C.

Born to Moses Karpinowicz and Rachel Levitan in Wilno, Poland (present-day Vilnius, Lithuania), Rita and her husband, Norbert Horowitz, a graduate of the Moscow State Jewish Theater, created a Yiddish theater that performed for Holocaust survivors throughout Europe. The couple emigrated in 1948 to the United States, where she acted in the Yiddish theater in New York City. She and other actors read the works of Sholom Aleichem at the home of Bel Kaufman, Aleichem's granddaughter, each year on the anniversary of the writer's death.

== Death ==
Rita Karin died at 73 from undisclosed causes in New York City. She was survived by her son, Dr. Michael Horowitz, and daughter, Mrs. Rochelle Axelrod, and five grandchildren.

== Filmography ==
Year	Title	Role	Notes
1971	The Gang That Couldn't Shoot Straight	Mrs. Goldfarb	
1972	Up the Sandbox	Mrs. Grossbard	Uncredited
1978	Matilda	Spectator	
1978	The Big Fix	Aunt Sonya	
1982	Sophie's Choice	Yetta	
1989	Enemies, A Love Story	Mrs. Schreier	
1991	He Said, She Said	Mrs. Spepk	
1991	Age Isn't Everything		
1993	The Pickle	Grandmother	
1994	Full Cycle	Gram	(final film role)
