= 3rd Rock from the Sun =

American television sitcom (1996–2001)

- Genre: Sitcom; Science fiction; Satire
- Created by: Bonnie Turner; Terry Turner
- Directed by: James Burrows; Robert Berlinger; Terry Hughes
- Starring: John Lithgow; Kristen Johnston; French Stewart; Joseph Gordon-Levitt; Jane Curtin; Simbi Khali; Elmarie Wendel; Wayne Knight
- Theme music composer: Ben Vaughn (seasons 1–3); Big Bad Voodoo Daddy (season 5); Ben Vaughn & Jeff Sudakin (season 6)
- Composers: Ben Vaughn (seasons 1–4); Ben Vaughn & Jeff Sudakin (seasons 5–6)
- Country of origin: United States
- Original language: English
- No. of seasons: 6
- No. of episodes: 139 (list of episodes)

Production
- Executive producers: John Lithgow; Bonnie Turner; Terry Turner; Marcy Carsey; Tom Werner; Caryn Mandabach; Linwood Boomer (season 1); Bill Martin; Mike Schiff (seasons 4–5); David Sacks (seasons 4–5); Bob Kushell; Christine Zander (seasons 5–6); David Goetsch; Jason Venokur (season 6)
- Producers: Patrick Kienlen; David Goetsch; Jason Venokur; David M. Israel; Jim O'Doherty; Andrew Orenstein; Michael Glouberman; Gregg Mettler; Tim Ryder; Aron Abrams
- Camera setup: Film; Multi-camera
- Running time: 22 minutes
- Production company: The Carsey-Werner Company

Original release
- Network: NBC
- Release: January 9, 1996 – May 22, 2001

3rd Rock from the Sun is an American television sitcom created by Bonnie and Terry Turner, which originally aired from January 9, 1996, to May 22, 2001, on NBC. The show is about four extraterrestrials who are on an expedition to Earth, the third planet from the Sun, which they consider to be a very insignificant planet. The extraterrestrials pose as a human family to observe the behavior of human beings. The series was produced by The Carsey-Werner Company.

The show premiered three years after the film Coneheads, which was also written by the Turners, and featured a similar premise of extraterrestrials arriving on Earth and assimilating into American society.

== Overview ==
The premise of the show revolves around an extraterrestrial research expedition hailing from a planet in a barred spiral galaxy on the Cepheus-Draco border attempting to live as a normal human family in the fictional city of Rutherford, Ohio, said to be 52 mi (84 km) outside of Cleveland, where they live in an attic apartment. The show's humor is principally derived from the aliens' attempts to study human society and understand the human condition, while living as humans on Earth, reflecting on human life from the perspective of aliens. Most of the episodes are named after the protagonist, Dick. In later episodes, they have become more accustomed to Earth and are often more interested in their human lives than in their mission.

The show also takes humor from its mirroring of all human anthropological expeditions and their assumptions of superiority to the "natives", as well as their inability to distinguish themselves from the natives. Dr. Mary Albright (Jane Curtin) is a professor of anthropology at fictional Pendelton State University, and many of the issues with which the four aliens struggle appear in her conversation and work. Furthermore, these four alien researchers end up looking approximately like joyriders as they get drawn increasingly further into human life.

Dick Solomon (John Lithgow), the High Commander and leader of the expedition, is the family provider and a physics professor at Pendelton (with Lithgow's eldest son Ian playing Leon, one of his less-successful students). Information officer and oldest member of the crew Tommy (Joseph Gordon-Levitt) has been given the body of a teenager and is forced to enroll in high school (later college), leaving security officer Sally (Kristen Johnston) and "the one with the transmitter in his head", Harry (French Stewart), to spend their lives as 20-somethings hanging out at home and bouncing through short-term jobs. The show also involves their relationships with humans, mostly their love interests.

The family often communicates through Harry with their off-world (and usually unseen) boss, the Big Giant Head, who when he finally visits Earth, is played by William Shatner. Harry unexpectedly (and often in inconvenient circumstances) stands up, his arms stiff (acting as the antenna), and proclaims: "Incoming message from the Big Giant Head!"

== Cast ==
=== Main characters ===
From left to right: John Lithgow as Dick, Joseph Gordon-Levitt (top) as Tommy, Jane Curtin (bottom) as Mary, Kristen Johnston as Sally, and French Stewart as Harry

- John Lithgow as Dick Solomon
- Kristen Johnston as Sally Solomon
- French Stewart as Harry Solomon
- Joseph Gordon-Levitt as Tommy Solomon
- Jane Curtin as Mary Albright
- Simbi Khali as Nina Campbell (seasons 3–6, recurring previously)
- Elmarie Wendel as Mamie Dubcek (seasons 3–6, recurring previously)
- Wayne Knight as Officer Don Orville (seasons 3–6, recurring previously)

=== Recurring characters ===
- David DeLuise as Bug Pollone, one of Dick's students
- Ian Lithgow as Leon, one of Dick's students
- Danielle Nicolet as Caryn, one of Dick's students
- Chris Hogan as Aubrey Pitman, one of Dick's students
- Ileen Getz as Dr. Judith Draper, professor at Pendelton and colleague of Mary
- Shay Astar as August Leffler, Tommy's first girlfriend (seasons 1–3, sparsely appears in seasons 3 and 4)
- Larisa Oleynik as Alissa Strudwick, Tommy's second girlfriend (seasons 4–6)
- Ron West as Dr. Vincent Strudwick, Alissa's father and rival to Dick (seasons 2–6)
- William Shatner as The Big Giant Head, the aliens' boss
- Jan Hooks as Vicki Dubcek, daughter of Ms. Dubcek, Harry's on-and-off girlfriend and later the wife of the Big Giant Head and the mother of his child
- John Cleese as Dr. Liam Neesam, a professor who briefly has a relationship with Mary, and is later revealed to be an evil alien (seasons 3 and 6)
- Chyna as Janice, a muscular female police officer who is briefly Harry's girlfriend
- Michael Milhoan as Coach Strickland, a high school physical education teacher at Tommy's high school

== Production ==
1962 Rambler American 400 Convertible ("The Fifth Solomon") from 3rd Rock from the Sun on display at the Kenosha History Center

=== Theme music ===
The show's opening theme music for the first four seasons was composed by Ben Vaughn, as a 1950s style instrumental rock piece. The theme was extended slightly in season three, when Simbi Khali, Elmarie Wendel, and Wayne Knight were officially made series regulars and added to the opening credits. During season one, James Earl Jones provided a voice introduction describing the crew. For Christmas episodes, jingle bells were added to the theme. The only major change to the theme was in season five, when the original Ben Vaughn version was replaced by a big band version of the theme, performed by the group Big Bad Voodoo Daddy, and was only used during that season. For the sixth and final season, the original theme returned other than two episodes that used a modern jazz version of the song.

=== Title sequence ===
The opening title sequence, which was produced by the London graphic design firm SVC Television, opens with computerized shots of planets and celestial bodies, some either with the planets dancing or moving in warp speed. It opens and closes with a shot of Earth (which at the open is where the show's title logo appears, after a sunburst appears on the side of Earth). For the sixth and final season only, the typeface of the cast and creators' names was altered.

== Episodes ==
Season	Episodes	Originally released		Rank	Rating
Season	Episodes	First released	Last released	Rank	Rating
1	20	January 9, 1996	May 21, 1996	22	12.1
2	26	September 22, 1996	May 18, 1997	27	10.8
3	27	September 24, 1997	May 20, 1998	44	8.5
4	24	September 23, 1998	May 25, 1999	74	6.9
5	22	September 21, 1999	May 23, 2000	75	6.0
6	20	October 24, 2000	May 22, 2001	87	5.6

== Broadcast ==
=== Syndication ===
In the United States, the series is distributed for syndication by Carsey-Werner Distribution, and entered broadcast syndication in September 1999, where it continued until the fall of 2004, when the show moved into limited-run barter syndication, where it remained until 2016; The Program Exchange handled distribution for Carsey-Werner. ABC Family aired reruns between 2002 and 2006. Reruns of the series aired on TV Land from 2008 through 2010. In the fall of 2010, ReelzChannel began airing the series. The series made its debut on digital broadcast network Laff on July 16, 2018, until May 16, 2021, when it moved to IFC. It aired on Cozi TV from July 18, 2021, to July 6, 2024.

In Italy, this series aired on Italia 1 under the name Una famiglia del terzo tipo (A family of the third kind) in 1999.

This series rerun is now also aired on Malaysia's national broadcast TV channel RTM's TV2 in the 12:30 am time slot on Tuesday and Wednesday nights.

In the United Kingdom, the series originally aired on BBC Two from 1996 to 2002, and ITV2 later reran the entire series from 2005 to 2006. It has since reran on Comedy Central, Channel 4, and 5Star.

In the fall of 2011, Canada's TVTropolis cable channel began airing the show, and featured a long weekend marathon run of episodes.

=== Streaming ===
Netflix made the complete series available online in March 2011. It was removed several months later in the fall of 2011, but returned on March 15, 2015, and was removed again exactly two years later. The series also was available to stream on Hulu.

The series was available to stream in the United States on Amazon Prime Video, FilmRise, Tubi, Pluto TV, Crackle, Vudu, IMDb TV and Peacock, Hoopla and through television providers carrying IFC on demand, but is not currently available outside of purchase as of 2026.

In the United Kingdom, as of 2024, the full series is available on Sky Go and Channel 4.

In Australia, as of 2024, the full series is available on Stan.

=== Home media ===
Anchor Bay Entertainment released all six seasons of 3rd Rock from the Sun on DVD for the first time in 2005–2006. Seasons 1 & 2 contain the edited, syndicated versions of the episodes instead of the original broadcast versions. As of 2010, these releases have been discontinued and are out of print. On these DVDs, the bloopers segments (on the last disc of each season) are in 16:9 format, indicating the series may have been filmed in 16:9 format.

On May 4, 2011, Mill Creek Entertainment announced they had acquired the rights to re-release the series on DVD in Region 1. They have subsequently re-released seasons 1–4. These releases contain the unedited, original broadcast versions of the episodes. Seasons 5 and 6 were re-released on January 8, 2013.

On May 14, 2013, Mill Creek released 3rd Rock from the Sun – The Complete Series on DVD in Region 1.

Network DVD released all six seasons on DVD in the UK. While seasons 1–4 feature unedited versions of the episodes, seasons five and six feature syndicated, edited episodes. Network re-released the series in 2008 in an individual set and a complete collection.

Magna Home Entertainment released all six seasons on DVD in Australia between 2005 and 2007. These releases have been discontinued and are now out of print. Beyond Home Entertainment re-released the entire series in 2010.

Original sets
Season	Release date			Features
Season	Region 1 (Anchor Bay)	Region 2 (Network)	Region 4 (Magna)	Features
Season 1	July 26, 2005	May 17, 2004	November 9, 2005	20 episodes; 4 discs (Region 1 & 2); 3 discs (Region 4); 4:3 aspect ratio; English: Dolby Digital 2.0; BBFC rating: 12; ACB rating: PG; Special features: blooper reel; behind-the-scenes; cast interviews: John Lithgow, Kristen Johnston, French Stewart, Joseph Gordon-Levitt, Jane Curtain, Simbi Khali, Elmarie Wendel, Wayne Knight; (John Lithgow and Simbi Khali feature only in the interviews on the Region 2 release); Season One highlights (Region 1 & 2 only); TV spots (Region 1 only); 16-page collectable booklet (Region 1 only); DVD-ROM: Teleplays (Region 1 only); Episodic promos (Region 2 only); (no subtitles)
Season 2	October 25, 2005	June 21, 2004	November 9, 2005	26 episodes; 4 discs; 4:3 aspect ratio; English: Dolby Digital 2.0; BBFC rating: PG; ACB rating: PG; Special features: Bloopers; Season Two Highlights (Region 1 & 4 only); John Lithgow interview (Region 1 & 4 only); TV Spots; 1 pair of 3D glasses (Region 1 only); 2 pairs of 3D glasses (Region 2 & 4 only); Alternate season ending; Behind the scenes of 3D episode; 3D episode bloopers; Booklet (not listed on cover); Episodic promos (Region 2 only); Best of Sally (Region 4 only); (no subtitles)
Season 3	February 21, 2006	August 30, 2004	February 9, 2006	27 episodes; 4 discs; 4:3 aspect ratio; English: Dolby Digital 2.0; BBFC rating: PG; ACB rating: PG; Special features: Bloopers (Region 1 & 2 only); French Stewart interview (Region 1 & 2 only); "Wild About Harry" – favorite Harry moments (Region 1 & 2 only); Interviews with cast – The Superest 2-Part Episode Ever! (Region 1 & 2 only); Audio Commentaries (Region 1 & 2 only); Season Three highlights (Region 1 & 2 only); TV Spots (Region 1 & 2 only); 16-page booklet (Region 1 & 4 only); Episodic promos (Region 2 only); (no subtitles)
Season 4	May 2, 2006	October 25, 2004	July 5, 2006	24 episodes; 4 discs; 4:3 aspect ratio; English: Dolby Digital 2.0; BBFC rating: PG; ACB rating: PG; Special features: Bloopers; Season Four highlights; Jane Curtin interview: Mary is Just Albright With Me (Region 1 only); 16-page collectible booklet; Cast interviews: Kristen Johnston, Wayne Knight and Jane Curtin (Region 2 only); Episodic promos (Region 2 only); (No subtitles); (No special features on Region 4)
Season 5	August 15, 2006	January 24, 2005	February 7, 2007	22 episodes; 4 discs; 4:3 aspect ratio; English: Dolby Digital 2.0; BBFC rating: PG; ACB rating: PG; Special features: Bloopers; 16-page collectable booklet (Region 1 only); Cast interviews: French Stewart, Joseph Gordon-Levitt and Elmarie Wendel (Region 2 only); Episodic promos (Region 2 only); Episodic promos (Region 2 only); (No subtitles); (No special features on Region 4)
Season 6	November 14, 2006	January 24, 2005	February 7, 2007	20 episodes; 4 discs (Region 1); 2 discs (Region 2); 3 discs (Region 4); 4:3 aspect ratio; English: Dolby Digital 2.0; BBFC rating: 12; ACB rating: PG; Special features: 3rd Rock: Six Season of Memories (Region 1 only); Final episode alternate ending; Alternate show ending introduction (2 parts) (Region 1 only); Cast interviews (Region 2 only); Stills galleries (Region 2 only); Episodic promos, TV spots and radio spots (Region 2 only); Episodic promos (Region 2 only); (No subtitles); (No special features on Region 4)
Seasons 1–6	—N/a	October 25, 2004	—N/a	139 episodes; 18 discs; 4:3 aspect ratio; English: Dolby Digital 2.0; BBFC rating: 12; (See individual sets for special features); (No subtitles)

Redistribution sets
Season	Release date		
Season	Region 1 (Mill Creek)	Region 2 (Network)	Region 4 (Beyond Home)
Season 1	September 13, 2011	November 3, 2008	November 15, 2010
Season 2	September 13, 2011	November 3, 2008	November 15, 2010
Season 3	April 3, 2012	November 3, 2008	November 15, 2010
Season 4	April 3, 2012	November 3, 2008	November 15, 2010
Season 5	January 8, 2013	November 3, 2008	November 15, 2010
Season 6	January 8, 2013	November 3, 2008	November 15, 2010
Seasons 1–6	May 14, 2013	November 3, 2008	November 18, 2010
Seasons 1–6	May 14, 2013	November 3, 2008	8 June 2012(†)
Seasons 1–6	May 14, 2013	November 3, 2008	April 1, 2015(‡)

† – denotes a reissued set
‡ – denotes a limited edition set

== Reception ==
=== Nielsen rankings ===
Season	TV season	Rank
1	1995–1996	22
2	1996–1997	28
3	1997–1998	44
4	1998–1999	77
5	1999–2000	82
6	2000–2001	89

=== Awards and nominations ===
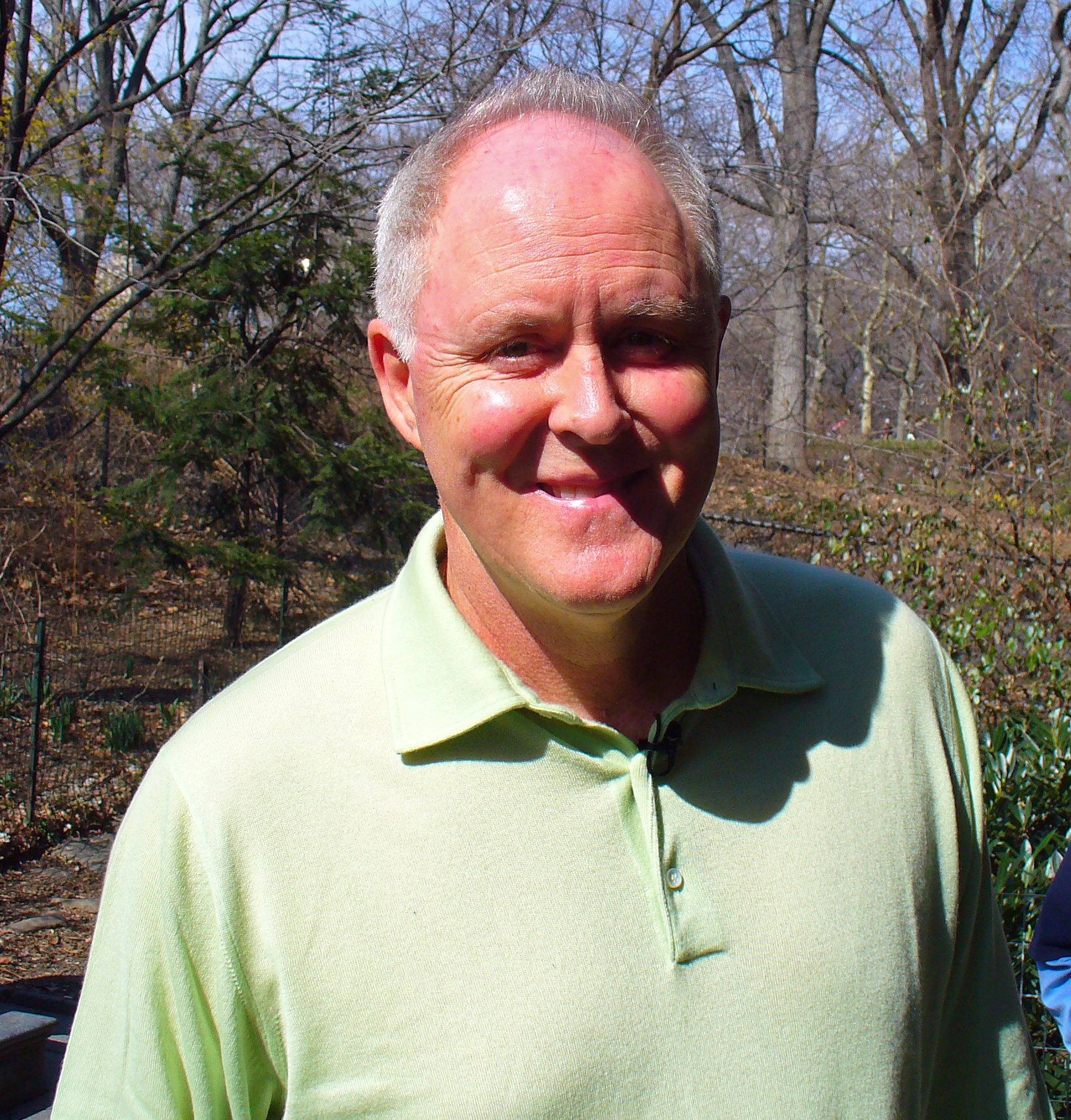
John Lithgow

In 1997, 3rd Rock won the most Primetime Emmy Awards (five from eight nominations) for a television series:

- 1996, 1997, 1998, 1999, 2000, 2001 — Outstanding Lead Actor — Comedy Series — John Lithgow
- 1997, 1998, 1999 — Outstanding Supporting Actress — Comedy Series — Kristen Johnston
- 1996, 1997 — Outstanding Hairstyling for a Series — Pixie Schwartz
- 1996 — Outstanding Directing for a Comedy Series — James Burrows
- 1998 — Outstanding Directing for a Comedy Series — Terry Hughes
- 1997 — Outstanding Special Visual Effects — Glen Bennett, Visual Effects Artists; Patrick Shearn, Visual Effects Supervisor; Chris Staves, Visual Effects Artists
- 1997, 1999, 2000 — Outstanding Sound Mixing — Comedy Series
- 1998 — Outstanding Sound Mixing — Comedy Series — "A Nightmare on Dick Street"
- 1997, 1998 — Outstanding Costume Design — Series — Melina Root
- 1997, 1998 — Outstanding Comedy Series
- 1997 — Outstanding Choreography — Marguerite Derricks
- 1998 — Outstanding Guest Actress in a Comedy Series — Jan Hooks as Vicki Dubcek
- 1998 — Outstanding Guest Actor in a Comedy Series — John Cleese as Dr. Neesam
- 1999, 2000 — Outstanding Multicamera Picture Editing for a Series
- 1999 — Outstanding Guest Actress in a Comedy Series — Kathy Bates as Charlotte Everly and Laurie Metcalf as Jennifer
- 1999 — Outstanding Guest Actor in a Comedy Series — William Shatner as the Big Giant Head
- 2000 — Outstanding Cinematography for a Multicamera Series

John Lithgow received an Emmy Award nomination for Outstanding Lead Actor in a Comedy Series for each year the show was broadcast, winning the Emmy in 1996, 1997, and 1999. Accepting the 1999 award, he said, "Many wonderful things have happened to me in my life, but the two best are 3rd Rock and my dear family."

Golden Globe Awards

- 1997 — Best Actor in a Television Comedy or Musical — John Lithgow

Screen Actors Guild Awards

- 1996, 1997 — Best Male Actor — Comedy Series — John Lithgow

== Other media ==
A tie-in book, 3rd Rock from the Sun: The Official Report on Earth, was released in 1997. It is essentially a report of the Solomons' findings during their stay on Earth. Primarily a source of humor, the book includes such features as "What to do if you encounter Jell-O", a fan biography of Katie Couric written by Harry, and Sally's version of a Cosmo quiz. Portions of the book are included in the booklets inside each season set of the series.

Despite the report's being set within the fictional world of 3rd Rock, a foreword written by John Lithgow himself is included in which he explains how he was abducted by the 3rd Rock producers and forced to work on their production. A Post-it note is attached to the foreword, apparently written by Dick Solomon, stating he does not know why the foreword is there, but that Lithgow is an Earth actor who appeared in "some helicopter movie".
