= Granite Real Estate =

Canada-based REIT

Granite Real Estate Investment Trust
- Type: Public
- Traded as: NYSE: GRP.U; TSX: GRT.UN
- Industry: Real estate
- Headquarters: Toronto, Ontario, Canada
- Key people: Kelly Marshall, Chairman of the Board, Kevan Gorrie, President and Chief Executive Officer
- Website: www.granitereit.com

Granite Real Estate Investment Trust (formerly MI Developments Inc.) is a Canadian-based REIT engaged in the acquisition, development, ownership and management of industrial, warehouse and logistics properties in North America and Europe. It was originally composed principally of former holdings of Magna International.

== History ==
Granite was originally a part of Magna International and was spun-off as a public company known as MI Developments in 2003. MI Developments was indirectly controlled by Frank Stronach, founder of Magna, through a multiple voting share structure. In 2009, Magna Entertainment Corporation, which was majority owned by MI Developments, went bankrupt. In the preceding years, MI Developments had provided significant debt financing to MEC, often against the wishes of many of its shareholders, who alleged that the transfers benefited Frank Stronach at the expense of MI Developments.

In 2011, Frank Stronach gave up control of MI Developments. In return, the company transferred the gaming assets of the former Magna Entertainment Group to The Stronach Group, which was still controlled by Stronach. In 2012, MI Developments changed its name to Granite Real Estate, reconstituted its board and senior management, moved its headquarters from Aurora to Toronto, Ontario and announced its conversion from a corporate structure to a stapled unit real estate investment trust effective January 2013.

In 2017, certain dissident shareholders launched a proxy battle and proposed the addition of three new directors on the company's board. The shareholders were concerned about the company's cash reserve, which they perceived as excessive. The dissidents were successful in their campaign and Granite’s board was reconstituted following the annual general meeting in June 2017. In September 2017, Mike Forsayeth, Granite’s then CEO, announced that he would retire in the ensuing 12 months. In August 2018, Kevan Gorrie was appointed as President and Chief Executive Officer.

== Properties ==
Granite’s tenants include Magna International Inc. (and its operating subsidiaries) as its principal tenant (responsible for approximately 28% of revenue) as well as tenants from various other industries. As at September 30, 2018, Granite owned approximately 85 investment properties located in Canada, the United States and Europe comprising approximately 33 million square feet of leasable area with a reported value of approximately CAD $3.2 billion. In terms of revenue, 26% of rental revenue is from Canada, 31% is from the United States, 27% is from Austria, and 15% is from the rest of Europe.
