= Jeff Sudakin =

Jeff Sudakin is a music composer and producer, working mainly in television and film. His notable credits include the US TV series Robot and Monster, That '70s Show (three seasons, with Ben Vaughn) and 3rd Rock from the Sun (seasons 3 through 6, also with Ben Vaughn). He was nominated for a Daytime Emmy award in 2013 for Outstanding Original Song - Children's and Animation for "The Forgiveness Song", included in episode 29 of Robot and Monster. He began serving as Executive Music Producer for hitRECord.org in 2013.

He attended Hillel Day School in Farmington Hills, Michigan.
