= Marcy Carsey =

American television producer (born 1944)

- Born: Marcia Lee Peterson; November 21, 1944 (age 81); Weymouth, Massachusetts, U.S.
- Education: University of New Hampshire, Durham (BA)
- Occupation: Television producer
- Years active: 1982–present
- Spouse: John Carsey (1969–2002, his death)
- Children: 2

Marcy Carsey (born Marcia Lee Peterson; November 21, 1944) is an American television producer and a member of the George Foster Peabody Awards board of jurors. She is best known for her work with fellow producer Tom Werner forming the company Carsey-Werner Productions in 1981.

== Life and career ==
Carsey was born in Weymouth, Massachusetts. She graduated from the University of New Hampshire with a degree in English literature.

In the 1960s, she was a tour guide at NBC in New York City, moved up to The Tonight Show Starring Johnny Carson later becoming a story editor for the Tomorrow Entertainment company. In 1974, she began working for ABC as a comedy programming executive. During her tenure, she developed the sitcoms Happy Days, Mork & Mindy and Soap. In 1980, she left ABC and in 1982 started Carsey Productions, an independent production company. She was joined in this venture a year later by Tom Werner who had worked with her at ABC. Together they formed Carsey-Werner Productions.

Together, they produced the sitcoms The Cosby Show, A Different World, Roseanne, Grace Under Fire, 3rd Rock from the Sun, That '70s Show, Grounded for Life and other series. In 2000, Carsey along with Werner and longtime partner Caryn Mandabach joined Oprah Winfrey to start Oxygen, a 24-hour cable channel which catered to the lifestyle and entertainment interests of the "millennial woman". In 2007, NBC Universal purchased the network.

In 1990, she was awarded the Women in Film Crystal Award. In 1996, she was inducted into the Television Hall of Fame. In 1999, she received the Golden Plate Award of the American Academy of Achievement. In 2000, she was again recognized by Women in Film with the Lucy Award in recognition of her excellence and innovation in her creative works that have enhanced the perception of women through the medium of television.

In 2013, Marcy Carsey made a gift of $20 million to the University of New Hampshire to support the creation of the new Carsey School of Public Policy. This gift is the second largest in the university’s history.

== Personal life ==
Carsey was married to John Jay Carsey from April 12, 1969, until his death on April 2, 2002. Together, they had two children, Rebecca and John.
