= Tom Werner =

American television producer and businessman (born 1950)

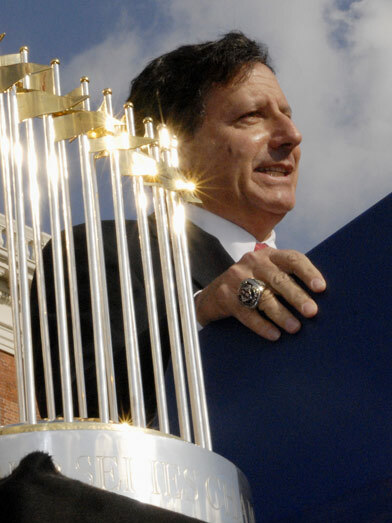
- Werner in 2007

Chairman of the Boston Red Sox
- Incumbent
- Assumed office February 2002

Chairman of Liverpool F.C.
- Incumbent
- Assumed office December 1, 2010
- Preceded by: Martin Broughton

Personal details
- Born: Thomas Charles Werner; April 12, 1950 (age 76) New York City, U.S.
- Spouses: Jill Troy Werner (divorced); Jennifer Ashton (m. 2022)
- Children: 3
- Education: St. Bernard's School; Hotchkiss School
- Alma mater: Harvard University (BA)
- Occupation: Television producer, businessman

Thomas Charles Werner (born April 12, 1950) is an American television producer and businessman. Through his investment in Fenway Sports Group, he is currently chairman of both Liverpool F.C. and the Boston Red Sox.

Werner first became a part owner of the San Diego Padres in 1990, later was part of a group that purchased the Boston Red Sox, and has served as chairman of the Red Sox since February 27, 2002. Since then, the team has won four World Series—the 2004 title ending an 86-year championship drought—and qualified for the postseason ten times. In 2018, the Red Sox won a franchise-record 108 games and went on to win a ninth World Series title. Werner became chairman of Liverpool F.C. in 2010. In his time in office, Liverpool has won nine trophies, the league cup in 2012, 2022 and 2024, the UEFA Champions League in 2019, the UEFA Super Cup in 2019, the FIFA Club World Cup also in 2019, the FA Cup in 2022, the FA Community Shield in 2022 and the Premier League in 2020 and 2025.

As a television producer, Werner formed a partnering with producer Marcy Carsey to create Carsey-Werner. The company produced several shows including The Cosby Show, Roseanne, 3rd Rock from the Sun and That '70s Show.

== Early life ==
Werner was born in Los Angeles, California, U.S., to a Jewish family who originally hail from Germany, but emigrated to New York City years later. He is the one out of three children who birthed to Elizabeth (née Grumbach) and Henry Werner. He has two siblings Patsy Werner Hanson and Peter Werner. He attended the St. Bernard's School in Manhattan, The Hotchkiss School in Lakeville, Connecticut. Werner later graduated from Harvard University in 1971.

== Television career ==
In 1973, Werner entered television by working for ABC-TV. In 1975, he became the Director of East Coast Prime Time Development. Werner was promoted to senior vice president of the prime-time development department in 1979. While at ABC, Werner was involved in the development of Mork & Mindy, Bosom Buddies, Soap and Taxi.

Werner left the network in 1980 and co-founded The Carsey-Werner Company with Marcy Carsey the same year. In this capacity he served as executive producer of such television programs as The Cosby Show (targeted at African-American/Black viewing) and its spin-off A Different World, along Roseanne, Grace Under Fire, 3rd Rock from the Sun, That '70s Show and Grounded for Life. In 1996, Werner was inducted into the Television Hall of Fame.

In 2000, Werner, Carsey and longtime partner Caryn Mandabach joined Oprah Winfrey to plan and launch Oxygen, a 24-hour cable TV channel which catered to the lifestyle and entertainment interests of the "millennial woman". In 2007, NBC Universal purchased the network for $925 million, and in 2017, it was rebranded as a multi-platform site with a focus on true-crime programming for women.

In 2018, Werner served as executive producer for the revival of Roseanne and was the executive producer for the spin-off continuation of The Conners after Roseanne was cancelled by ABC in May 2018 amid Roseanne Barr's controversial tweet about Valerie Jarrett, a former advisor to ex-President Barack Obama. In 2019, Werner, along with Sara Gilbert launched Sara+Tom, by combining two companies, his Werner Entertainment, and Gilbert's TV branch, both of which worked after the success of The Conners.

== Sports ==
=== San Diego Padres ===
Werner's entry into sports team ownership came when he and 14 other Southern California-based investors purchased the San Diego Padres from McDonald's heiress Joan Kroc for US$75 million on June 14, 1990. As holder of the largest financial stake in the ballclub, he served as the team's general managing partner. It was a difficult period economically in Major League Baseball, which was riven by the financial disparity between small- and large-market franchises and ultimately cancelled the 1994 World Series because of a work stoppage that carried into the following season. Werner was appointed to Major League Baseball's Executive Council and was chairman of MLB's television negotiating committee, where he was an early proponent of the wild-card format that was first implemented in 1995.

Just under six weeks into his new ownership role, he attempted to cross-promote the team with one of his television series in between games of a twi-night doubleheader versus the Cincinnati Reds at Jack Murphy Stadium on July 25, 1990. He had invited Roseanne Barr, the eponymous star of one of his sitcoms, to perform The Star-Spangled Banner on an evening billed as Working Women's Night at the ballpark. She comically sang the national anthem with a loud, screechy voice. After finishing her rendition, she grabbed her crotch and spat at the ground in an attempt to parody baseball players. The publicity stunt was met with condemnation from baseball fans and sportswriters, some of whom called it either the "Barr-Mangled Banner" or the "Barr-Strangled Banner."

The Padres missed capturing the National League (NL) West title by three games in 1989, a year prior to the start of Werner's tenure. Its 89–73 record was then the second best in franchise history. After a pair of winning seasons with third-place finishes in 1991 and 1992, the team fell precipitously into the NL West cellar at 61–101 in 1993, six games behind the expansion Colorado Rockies. It was on its way to a second consecutive last-place finish at 47–70, but a players strike prematurely ended the 1994 campaign.

Critics at the time attributed this sudden free fall in the standings to cost-cutting measures ordered by Werner and his fellow investors. The so-called Fire Sale of 1993 began on August 31, 1992, when Craig Lefferts was traded to the Baltimore Orioles. In the offseason, Randy Myers and Benito Santiago were allowed to become free agents, Tony Fernández and Mike Maddux were dealt to the New York Mets and Jerald Clark was selected by the Rockies in the expansion draft. Gary Sheffield was sent to the Marlins on June 24, 1993, Fred McGriff was shipped to the Atlanta Braves. Bruce Hurst and Greg Harris were moved to the Rockies on July 26. The trade of Darrin Jackson to the Toronto Blue Jays on March 30, 1993, resulted in a class action filed against the Padres. During the previous December, the team sent a letter to season-ticket holders assuring them that the maximum effort would be made to retain Jackson. Economic circumstances changed, however, after Jackson won a $2.1-million arbitration award in February. Refunds were offered to ticket holders involved in the lawsuit.

Werner's term as majority owner ended when John Moores acquired an 80% interest for $80 million on December 22, 1994. Werner retained a 10% share in the franchise until he sold it to Moores before the start of the 2007 season.

=== The Boston Red Sox and Fenway Sports Group ===
Werner returned to baseball in 2001, part of a group that included former Orioles and Padres CEO Larry Lucchino and Florida Marlins owner John W. Henry which made a successful bid to purchase the Boston Red Sox. Their bid, which totaled $700 million (including $40 million in assumed debt) was accepted by MLB on December 20, 2001, with formal approval coming on February 27, 2002. Henry served as principal owner, Werner was named chairman and Lucchino became club president and CEO, a collaboration that generated a historic level of success.

The new ownership group had been the only prospective purchasers committed to saving Fenway Park, the team's historic home, and after three years of making substantial improvements to the ballpark, the owners made a long-term commitment to remain in Fenway, leading to more than $400 million in improvements during the first 17 years of their tenure.

After the ballclub spent the 2002 season under interim GM Mike Port, who replaced Dan Duquette, the new ownership group promoted 28-year-old Theo Epstein, making him the youngest GM in baseball history. The Red Sox lost the 2003 ALCS in seven games to the New York Yankees in Epstein's first season, but under new manager Terry Francona overcame a three games to none deficit to the New York Yankees to win the 2004 ALCS, then defeated the St. Louis Cardinals for their first World Series title since 1918. World Series titles followed in 2007, 2013 and 2018.

After leaving the Red Sox in 2011, Francona criticized Werner for his focus on TV ratings, quoting Werner in a 2010 meeting as saying: "We need to start winning in a more exciting fashion." Francona also criticized Werner for exaggerating his role in Red Sox management:

Werner was constantly trying to assert his importance. When the Henry group first purchased the Red Sox, Werner hired a public relations firm to get his name in the local newspapers. When stories were written about Henry or the Red Sox, he was known to call writers and ask, "Why didn't you mention me in your story?"

=== Liverpool football ===
In 2010, the ownership group of Henry, Lucchino, and Werner bought Premier League team Liverpool from lawyers acting on behalf of the Royal Bank of Scotland, the lenders to former owners George N. Gillett, Jr. and Tom Hicks. On November 25, 2010, Liverpool announced that Werner would be installed as chairman, replacing Martin Broughton, beginning December 1, 2010.

In May 2012, Werner made a controversial decision by sacking coach and club icon Kenny Dalglish citing the club's poor league results. This was regarded as a poor decision by experts such as BBC's Alan Hansen, given Dalglish's success in lifting the club from four points above the relegation zone to a League Cup win and an FA Cup final appearance in just over a season. Swansea City's former coach, Brendan Rodgers, filled Dalglish's boots, helping Liverpool finish second in the 2013–14 Premier League that also earned a spot in the UEFA Champions league after a five-year absence. Rodgers was sacked just over a year later, after failing to qualify for the Champions League a second time, due partially to the sale of Luiz Suarez to Barcelona, and a disappointing start to the subsequent season.

German coach Jürgen Klopp was named his replacement. According to El País, co-owner John Henry did not trust public opinion, so he looked for a mathematical method very similar to Moneyball, which turned out to be Cambridge physicist Ian Graham's mathematical model to select the coach and players essential for Liverpool to win the UEFA Champions League. In his first year in charge, Klopp led the team to the Football League Cup Final and the UEFA Europa League final during the 2015–16 season. In 2017–18, despite the sale of Philippe Coutinho to Barcelona mid-season, Liverpool reached the 2018 UEFA Champions League Final which was their first time in eleven years. In the 2018–19 season, Liverpool finished second to Manchester City in the Premier League race by one point, and went on to win the 2019 UEFA Champions League Final to claim their sixth title in the competition, which was also the first trophy under Klopp's management. After the European Cup win, Klopp signed a contract extension to 2024. In June 2020, following a prolonged season due to the COVID-19 pandemic, Liverpool won the Premier League, their first ever Premier League title and their first top division league title since 1990.

== Community and philanthropy ==
Werner is the founding Chairman of the Red Sox Foundation, the charitable arm of the Boston Red Sox. Since its creation in 2002, the Red Sox Foundation has donated to more than 1,780 organizations, helped 288 Boston public school students with college scholarships through the Red Sox Scholars program, and supported hundreds of youth baseball programs in New England.

In 2008, Werner was involved in the creation of the Home Base Program, a partnership between the Red Sox Foundation and Massachusetts General Hospital to help veterans and their families cope with PTSD and traumatic brain injuries.

In November 2011, the Red Sox Foundation received Major League Baseball's first-ever "Commissioner's Award for Philanthropic Excellence" for the foundation's "Red Sox Scholars" program.

In January 2013, Werner received the Dave Winfield Humanitarian Award from the Professional Baseball Scouts Foundation at the organization's annual "In the Spirit of the Game" Sports and Entertainment Spectacular.

On October 30, 2014, Werner received the "Outstanding Civilian Service Award" from the United States Army for his creation of the Home Base Program.

From 2016 to 2020, Werner donated $113,250 to Democratic candidates and causes.

== Personal life ==
Currently, Werner lives in Los Angeles. He is divorced from his first wife Jill Troy Werner; they have three children: a son and two daughters. In January 2022, he became engaged to ABC News correspondent Dr. Jennifer Ashton. They were married on November 5, 2022, at the Harmonie Club in New York City. Dr. Ashton has two children.
