= The Exes season 1 =

The Exes
- Season 1
- No. of episodes: 10

Release
- Original network: TV Land
- Original release: November 30, 2011 – February 1, 2012

Season chronology
- Next → Season 2

The first season of the TV Land original sitcom The Exes premiered on November 30, 2011 and ended February 1, 2012. A total of ten episodes were produced. The series stars Donald Faison, Wayne Knight, Kristen Johnston, David Alan Basche and Kelly Stables.

== Season overview ==
The season begins with Holly moving her new client Stuart in with two of her divorced tenants Haskell and Phil. Over the course of the season Phil tries to set up Holly's assistant Eden, with a horse jockey to get him as a client, but he goes for Holly instead; Holly attempts to set up Stuart on his first date since his divorce, but it turns out his date is an escort; Haskell begins dating a woman over the internet and when she arrives for a visit Haskell gets Phil to pretend to be him; Phil goes to Stuart to get his tooth fixed and ends up sleeping with Stuart's long-time dental assistant.

Holly's mother visits her, and instead of telling her the truth about breaking up with her fiance, she moves back into the apartment she shared with her ex, while the boys stay at her place; Phil asks Stuart to be the translator for a Serbian lingerie model who can only speak her native language, but she ends up getting attracted to Stuart; Phil's ex-wife gets married so Phil no longer needs to pay her alimony; Holly begins dating basketball player Kevin Tyler, one of Phil's clients, which ends up affecting his basketball playing; and Holly asks one of the guys to be new boyfriend to make her ex-fiance jealous, but it doesn't go quite as planned.

== Cast ==
- Donald Faison as Phil Chase
- Wayne Knight as Haskell Lutz
- David Alan Basche as Stuart Gardner
- Kelly Stables as Eden Konkler
- Kristen Johnston as Holly Franklin

== Production ==
On March 21, 2011, the pilot was given a series order of ten episodes. The series premiered on November 30, 2011, and aired on Wednesday nights at 10:30 pm, following Hot in Cleveland. The series was created by Mark Reisman with the pilot directed by Andy Cadiff. The series is executive produced by Reisman, Franco Bario, Frank M. Garritano and Ben Raymond, alongside production companies Mark Reisman Productions and Acme Productions. Production on season one began in July 2011.

Guest stars for season one include, Judith Light as Marjorie, Holly's mother, Diedrich Bader as Paul, Holly's co-worker, Janina Gavankar as Carrie, Phil's ex-wife, Ken Marino as Brad, Holly's former cheating fiancé, Amar'e Stoudemire as Kevin Tyler, Phil's basketball player client who dates Holly, Kali Rocha as Deanna, Stuart's dental assistant, Victor Webster as Bob, a homeless man Holly becomes attracted to, Kim Poirier as Tracy, Ana Alexander as Tatiana, a Serbian lingerie model Phil dates, Paula Marshall as Katy, Stuart's date who turns out be an escort and Melanie Paxson as Rebecca, Haskell's internet girlfriend.

== Episodes ==
No. overall	No. in season	Title	Directed by	Written by	Original release date	Prod. code	U.S. viewers (millions)
1	1	"Pilot"	Andy Cadiff	Mark Reisman	November 30, 2011	101	1.43
When divorce attorney Holly (Kristen Johnston) sets up her newly single client Stuart (David Alan Basche) with some other divorced roommates, Phil (Donald Faison) and Haskell (Wayne Knight), things don't start out quite as Holly planned, until the unlikely roommates help Stuart come to terms with his divorce.
2	2	"A Little Romance"	Andy Cadiff	Ian Gurvitz	December 7, 2011	102	0.93
Phil tries to set up the diminutive Eden (Kelly Stables) with a horse jockey (James Madio) in order to get him as a client, but the jockey insists on being set up with Holly instead. Haskell helps Stuart sell his collection of old clocks on the internet.
3	3	"Working Girl"	Andy Cadiff	Gary Murphy	December 14, 2011	106	1.18
Holly sets Stuart up with Katy (Paula Marshall), a woman who turns out be an escort. Haskell tries to fool his ex-wife into thinking that he is on a cruise vacation.
4	4	"Lutz and the Real Girl"	Andy Cadiff	Howard Gewirtz	December 21, 2011	103	1.17
Haskell asks Phil to pretend to be him when his internet girlfriend Rebecca (Melanie Paxson) comes to town. After a homeless man who was doing his laundry in Holly's building shaves and cleans up in her shower, Holly becomes attracted to him.
5	5	"An Inconvenient Tooth"	Andy Cadiff	Mark Reisman	December 28, 2011	104	1.46
Phil is reluctant to have Stuart fix his tooth, due to his fear of dentists. He finally visits Stuart's office, then sleeps with Stuart's long-time dental assistant, Deanna (Kali Rocha). Eden borrows Holly's clothes to go clubbing.
6	6	"A Very Wrong Engagement"	Andy Cadiff	Howard Gewirtz	January 4, 2012	108	1.31
Holly's mother, Marjorie (Judith Light), visits and Holly must tell her that she is no longer engaged. So in an attempt to delay telling her mother the truth, Holly moves back into the apartment she shared with her ex, while the boys stay at her place.
7	7	"Lost in Translation"	Andy Cadiff	Ian Gurvitz	January 11, 2012	107	1.23
Phil dates Tatiana, a Serbian lingerie model who can only speak her native language. Phil asks Stuart to be her translator, until she becomes attracted to Stuart as well. Holly keeps making a fool of herself in front of a guy she likes. Haskell buys a coffin.
8	8	"My Dinner with Phil"	Andy Cadiff	Sue Tenney	January 18, 2012	105	0.98
Phil learns that his ex-wife is getting married and that he will no longer need to pay alimony, making him ecstatic. But he is faced with a dilemma when he catches his ex's new fiancee cheating on her. Holly tries to get romantic with Paul (Diedrich Bader), a co-worker.
9	9	"When Holly Broke Kevin"	Andy Cadiff	Gary Murphy	January 25, 2012	110	0.93
Holly begins dating basketball player Kevin Tyler (Amar'e Stoudemire), one of Phil's clients. Things go well until their sexual encounters interfere with Kevin's performance on the court. Haskell and Stuart get into sports betting.
10	10	"The Ex Always Rings Twice"	Andy Cadiff	Sue Tenney	February 1, 2012	109	1.18
Holly asks one of the guys to pretend to be a new boyfriend, in order to make her ex-fiance Brad (Ken Marino) jealous. However, each of them show up and encounter their own problems, making Holly's story less believable.
