= The Exes season 3 =

The Exes
- Season 3
- No. of episodes: 20

Release
- Original network: TV Land
- Original release: June 19, 2013 – February 26, 2014

Season chronology
- ← Previous; Season 2 Next → Season 4

The third season of the TV Land's original sitcom The Exes premiered on June 19, 2013. A total of 20 episodes were produced for the third season. The series stars Donald Faison, Wayne Knight, Kristen Johnston, David Alan Basche and Kelly Stables.

== Cast ==
- Donald Faison as Phil Chase
- Wayne Knight as Haskell Lutz
- David Alan Basche as Stuart Gardner
- Kelly Stables as Eden Konkler
- Kristen Johnston as Holly Franklin

== Production ==
On December 13, 2012, TV Land renewed The Exes for a third season of 10 episodes, set to premiere on June 19, 2013. Season three of The Exes began taping on March 27, 2013. Guest stars for this season include Jodi Lyn O'Keefe as a sex shop employee; Leslie Jordan as Percy, the president of the condo board; and Stacey Dash as Dana, a recommitted virgin who begins dating Phil. Dash's guest appearance reunited her with Donald Faison, they both co-starred together in the film Clueless and the television series of the same name. Additional guest stars include Grant Show as Alex, a perfect guy whom Phil, Haskell and Stuart meet on an internet dating site when they pose as Holly; Fred Dryer as Holly's boss; Cat Deeley as Charlotte, a beautiful woman (except for one flaw) that Stuart dates; Tyler Posey as Eric, a law student who develops a crush on Holly;, Lisa Ann Walter as Margo, Haskell's ex-wife; and Brandon Routh as Steve, a bartender at the bar the group frequents. Reprising roles from previous seasons were Diedrich Bader as Holly's boyfriend, Paul; Todd Stashwick as Phil's boss, Grant; and Janet Varney as Stuart's ex-wife, Lorna. Missi Pyle appears in a dual role as a sex addict named Sabrina, as well as Sabrina's wholesome identical twin, Julie. Leah Remini also recurred this season as Stuart's sister, Nicki. Johnston and Knight's former 3rd Rock From the Sun co-star Elmarie Wendel, guest starred in the season finale as Ruthie. On July 18, 2013, TV Land extended the episode order for season three to 20 episodes. Episode ten served as the summer finale, with the remainder of the season returning in December. Kristen Johnston was absent from a couple of episodes this season due to receiving treatment from being diagnosed with Lupus Myelitis.

== Episodes ==
No. overall	No. in season	Title	Directed by	Written by	Original release date	Prod. code	U.S. viewers (millions)
23	1	"Toy Story"	Shelley Jensen	Mark Reisman	June 19, 2013	301	1.27
Stuart thinks Holly's old plug-in vibrator is a back massager and borrows it without her knowledge. After the guys tell him what it really is, they unintentionally break it and try to get it fixed before she notices it's gone.
24	2	"The Holly's Buddies Story"	Jeff Melman	Gary Murphy	June 26, 2013	302	0.94
Paul wants to have more alone time with Holly, so he asks the guys to stay away from them. While the guys are trying to give Holly and Paul more space, Holly is wondering why they have been avoiding her and thinks she did something wrong.
25	3	"Trading Places"	Andy Cadiff	Howard Gewirtz	July 10, 2013	304	0.89
Holly and Haskell compete for the attention of Julia (Anita Barone), a woman they meet at the same time. With Eden headed out of town, Holly needs a woman to vent to following her breakup with Paul, whereas Haskell desperately wants a relationship. Meanwhile, Phil unknowingly dates a "recommitted virgin" named Dana (Stacey Dash), while Stuart dates a sex addict named Sabrina (Missi Pyle).
26	4	"Zero Dark Forties"	Andy Cadiff	Ian Gurvitz	July 17, 2013	305	1.08
Holly's dating woes inspire the guys to secretly create an online dating profile for her, which gives them a new perspective on relationships.
27	5	"Defending Your Wife"	Jeff Melman	Maria Brown-Gallenberg	July 24, 2013	303	1.00
Haskell's ex-wife Margo (Lisa Ann Walter) suffers a head injury in a car accident on her way to her wedding, causing temporary memory loss. She thinks she is still married to Haskell, and that he is still a professional bowler. In order to refresh her memory, Haskell wants to track down her fiancée, but he then starts to pine for the days when Margo still loved him. Stuart and Phil move in with Holly while Margo stays with Haskell in the guys' apartment. Eden begins working a second job as a taste-maker spokesperson.
28	6	"Take This Job and Shove It"	Andy Cadiff	Michael Glouberman	July 31, 2013	306	1.18
Phil and Holly agree to stand up to their bosses to get promotions at their jobs. Phil goes through with it and gets fired, while Holly chickens out. When Holly personally meets with Phil's boss, Grant, to ask him to rehire Phil, she winds up representing Grant in his divorce case, making Phil even angrier. Stuart dates Charlotte (Cat Deeley), a woman he met online. Although he is fond of Charlotte, he can't get past her crooked teeth, so he asks for Haskell's help to embarrass her into getting them fixed.
29	7	"Pretty Women"	Andy Cadiff	Mark Reisman	August 7, 2013	307	1.11
Holly and Eden date charming French men who buy them expensive jewelry after a night of passion. Meanwhile, Stuart must learn to stand up for himself when a man threatens him in the bar.
30	8	"Prelude to a Kiss"	Andy Cadiff	Ian Gurvitz	August 14, 2013	308	0.95
Phil has just opened his new office, and Eden causes his hot new receptionist to quit. Phil asks Eden to fill in, and her advice later helps him land his very first client. This forces Holly to hire Haskell as a temporary assistant. When he learns about the disability coverage at Holly's office, Haskell becomes bent on getting injured. Elsewhere, Stuart seeks out the person who gave his dental office a bad Yelp review.
31	9	"The Hand That Robs the Cradle"	Andy Cadiff	Gary Murphy	August 21, 2013	309	1.27
Holly tutors a law student (Tyler Posey) who is half her age, and he becomes attracted to her. When Eden sees how hot the young man is, she suspects something isn't right. Haskell admires a woman from afar and wants to keep it that way, but Stuart concocts a plan for the two to meet in person. Meanwhile, Phil and Eden become "friends with benefits."
32	10	"My Ex-Boyfriend's Wedding"	Andy Cadiff	Howard Gewirtz	August 28, 2013	310	1.22
Paul has moved on and is getting married. He invites Holly, Eden and the guys to his wedding, creating an awkward situation. Meanwhile, Phil and Eden go to great lengths to prove they don't need to be a couple, while Haskell tries to hook up with a lonely, desperate bridesmaid (Nicole Sullivan).
33	11	"True Lies"	Terry Hughes	Mark Reisman	December 11, 2013	311	0.55
Eden shares a secret with Holly that she has occasionally "faked it" with Phil. Holly leaks it to Haskell and Stuart, causing Eden to feel like dating Phil means she's dating all four of the friends.
34	12	"How the Grinch Spent Xmas"	Terry Hughes	Gary Murphy	December 18, 2013	313	0.67
Holly has set up a special Christmas party with Eden and the guys, but gets delayed at JFK with a guy she met on a flight back from London. When she decides to remain with him as he is detained getting into the country, her friends get mad. But they eventually bring the Christmas party to her.
35	13	"Nothing in Common"	Shelley Jensen	Mark Reisman	January 1, 2014	314	0.88
Stuart's sister Nicki (Leah Remini) visits and says she's certain that her husband of 17 years is cheating on her. Stuart confronts the husband and confirms Nicki's suspicions, but there is a twist. Meanwhile, Phil and Eden consider a threesome with a woman that hit on Phil in the bar, while Haskell is so smitten with Nicki that he always gets tongue-tied in her presence.
36	14	"Bachelor Party"	Terry Hughes	Steve Joe	January 8, 2014	312	0.81
Phil is named one of New York's top ten eligible bachelors. While at the party thrown by the magazine, Eden meets up with some of her female friends and has a great time going out with them. This causes her and Phil to reevaluate their relationship. Holly meets a hot lawyer who is also on the top ten list, but an eyebrow incident gets in the way. Meanwhile, Stuart sees Sabrina, the sex addict he once dated, walk into the bar, but the woman claims to be Sabrina's twin, Julie.
37	15	"Starting Over"	Shelley Jensen	Ian Gurvitz	January 22, 2014	315	0.78
After Nicki struggles to find a job, Stuart offers her the receptionist position at his dental office while his regular receptionist is on leave, but he soon regrets his decision. Meanwhile, Phil's first date after his breakup with Eden turns out to be extremely clingy, and Haskell devises a plan to get Nicki to like him.
38	16	"Friends Without Benefits"	Shelley Jensen	Gary Murphy	January 29, 2014	316	0.89
Haskell tells Nicki she has an admirer but can't bring himself to tell her it is him, pretending instead it is a friend named "Pete". He plans to step in when "Pete" doesn't show for their blind date, but the plan goes awry when an old acquaintance named Pete shows up at just the wrong moment. Stuart and Phil sneak into Stuart's old home one last time before it is sold and get stuck in the closet when his ex-wife returns with her boyfriend.
39	17	"Nun Like It Hot"	Jeff Melman	Maria Brown-Gallenberg	February 5, 2014	317	0.87
Phil sleeps with Nicki's oldest and dearest friend Vanessa (Ayda Field), who (unknown to Phil) is going to become a nun. Phil and Stuart then try to keep Nicki from finding out. Meanwhile, Haskell and Eden take care of a fussy Holly after she suffers an injury.
40	18	"When Haskell Met Sammy"	Jeff Melman	Howard Gewirtz	February 12, 2014	318	0.63
Holly meets a hot pilot named Matt, whose brother Sam finds Haskell to be charming and funny. But Sam also thinks that Haskell is gay, like himself. Nicki tries to prove to Eden that she can party as hard as she does, but the two find themselves waking up the next morning in sailors' uniforms with no recollection of what happened. Meanwhile, Phil is afraid to attend a funeral for his old basketball coach, so he asks Stuart to tag along.
41	19	"My Fair Stuart"	Jeff Melman	Howard Gewirtz	February 19, 2014	319	0.67
Stuart has an opportunity to become a partner in a high-end Manhattan dentistry practice, and is invited to a dinner with three other dentists and their spouses. When his date falls through, he asks Holly to accompany him, but she realizes she represented the ex-wife of one dentist in a divorce case. He tries Eden, but she is wearing an eye patch from a champagne cork incident the night before. To his regret, Stuart has to ask Nicki to come-with and pretend to be a date instead of his sister. Meanwhile, Phil and Haskell both agree to get vasectomies, but both chicken out without telling the other. Guest Star: Tony Dovolani
42	20	"The Old Man and the Holly"	Rob Schiller	Maria Brown-Gallenberg	February 26, 2014	320	0.84
Holly begins dating her old law professor, with "old" being the key word when he reveals that he lives in an assisted living facility. After Holly falls out of his bed and hurts her hip, she starts transforming into "one of the gals" at the facility. Meanwhile, Nicki wants to get her "first time" after the divorce out of the way without the pressure of dating, and she asks Phil to do the deed. Though the two don't go through with it, Haskell thinks they have, and he barges into Nicki's apartment and proclaims his love for her to Phil -- just as Nicki walks into the room.
