= The Exes season 4 =

The Exes
- Season 4
- No. of episodes: 22

Release
- Original network: TV Land
- Original release: November 5, 2014 – September 16, 2015

Season chronology
- ← Previous; Season 3

The fourth and final season of the TV Land's original sitcom The Exes premiered on November 5, 2014 at 10:30 PM EST. A total of 22 episodes were produced for the fourth season, which was split into winter and summer segments of 12 and 10 episodes each, respectively. The series stars Donald Faison, Wayne Knight, Kristen Johnston, David Alan Basche and Kelly Stables.

As of September 16, 2015, 64 episodes of The Exes have aired, concluding the fourth season and the series.

== Cast ==
- Donald Faison as Phil Chase
- Wayne Knight as Haskell Lutz
- David Alan Basche as Stuart Gardner
- Kelly Stables as Eden Konkler
- Kristen Johnston as Holly Franklin
- Frances Turner as Zoey Banks

== Production ==
On February 3, 2014, TV Land renewed The Exes for a 12-episode fourth season, which premiered on November 5, 2014. Leah Remini continues her recurring role of Nikki Gardner into this season. Season four of The Exes began taping on June 25, 2014. On September 5, 2014, the episode order for season four was extended to 24 episodes, consisting of two 12-episode blocks. The first 12 episodes concluded on February 4, 2015, with the remaining 12 episodes set to begin on July 15, 2015. The show was cancelled on August 10, 2015 with 6 episodes left to air, bringing the season to a total of 22 episodes.

Guest stars for this season include Nadine Velazquez as Alessandra, Phil's high school crush that he reconnects with; Michael Trucco as Jeff, a presumed widower that Holly attempts to connect with; Stacy Keach as Bill Drake, a veteran whose daughter Stuart dates; Nikki DeLoach as Katie Drake, Bill's daughter who dates Stuart, thinking he's a soldier; Elizabeth Regen as Dani, Haskell's date, who Phil and Holly mistake for a man; Denyse Tontz as Chloe, a young hipster who Phil briefly dates, Coco Jones as Vanessa, a new intern at Holly's office; Peter Onorati as Frank Gardner, Stuart and Nikki's father; Jenifer Lewis as Caren Dupree, an actress from Phil's favorite childhood television show; Jonathan Cake as Robert Thomas, a famous chef that Stuart and Holly take lessons from; Leslie David Baker as Officer Wilson, a retiring cop that Haskell goes on a ride-along with; Christopher Titus as Officer Burke, a reckless gung-ho cop who takes over Haskell's ride-along; Arden Myrin as Stacy, a girl from Ohio that stays at the guys apartment while visiting New York; Matt Letscher as Charles Hayward, a Congressman that Holly meets in Jamaica, and becomes engaged to; Rebecca Wisocky as Victoria Chaplin, Charles' chief of staff, who takes a liking to Stuart; and Frances Turner as Zoey Banks, a Hollywood starlet who Phil shares a romance with. Brandon Routh reprised his season three role of Steve, in the season premiere. Judith Light also reprised her role as Majorie, in episode twelve. Lisa Ann Walter reprises her role as Margo, Haskell's ex-wife, in the final two episodes of the season.

== Episodes ==
No. overall	No. in season	Title	Directed by	Written by	Original release date	Prod. code	U.S. viewers (millions)
43	1	"The Devil Wears Hanes"	Andy Cadiff	Mark Reisman	November 5, 2014	401	0.47
Nikki comes to the apartment to confront Haskell after he professed his love. Though she isn't sure where things may be going, she agrees to a date. After a dinner-date that they both enjoy, they agree to take things slowly. But soon after, an old acquaintance of Nikki's named Steve (Brandon Routh) stops by unannounced, as he is in town to shoot an underwear commercial and needs a place to stay. Nikki sleeps with Steve and gets chastised by Holly. Nikki feels guilty and kicks Steve out, only to have Holly let Steve move in and sleep with her. Elsewhere, Stuart helps Phil reconnect with an unrequited high school crush named Alessandra (Nadine Velazquez). While Alessandra is still hot-looking, she reveals other qualities that turn Phil off.
44	2	"The Wedding Unplanner"	Andy Cadiff	Ian Gurvitz	November 12, 2014	402	0.66
Nikki agrees to let Holly finalize her divorce proceedings. Holly initially convinces Nikki to leave all emotion out of her demands, but then receives a reminder letter for her booking at a posh wedding banquet facility six months from now (which she had forgotten she booked so far in advance). This brings back painful memories of Holly's ex-fiancee, and she now wants to stick it to Nikki's ex. Meanwhile, Phil picks up a much younger woman (Denyse Tontz) to prove to Stuart that he still "has it", but later regrets his actions when he meets the girl's slacker friends and gets immersed in her hipster lifestyle. Later, Holly goes to get her deposit back, only to meet a bride there who thought she'd never get married. Holly announces to the gang that she is getting married in six months, though she doesn't know yet to whom.
45	3	"Love and Death"	Andy Cadiff	Maria Brown-Gallenberg	November 19, 2014	403	0.50
Desperate to find the man that will be her husband in six months, Holly pursues a handsome guy named Jeff (Michael Trucco) at the community center, unintentionally following him into a grief counseling session for people whose spouses have died. Elsewhere, Phil cracks a tooth on the eve of a big TV appearance covering the NFL draft. Stuart does surgery to fix it, but Phil comes out of the procedure with a lisp.
46	4	"An Officer and a Dental Man"	Andy Cadiff	Howard Gewirtz	November 26, 2014	404	0.72
In the bar, Phil is shunned by a woman named Dani (Elizabeth Regen), who soon strikes up a conversation with Haskell. As the two express similar interests and begin dating, Phil becomes convinced that Dani is really a man, and he enlists Holly to help him prove it. Meanwhile, after Stuart puts on a military uniform to make his monthly visit to provide free dental services at an area base, a woman named Katie (Nikki DeLoach) mistakes him for a real soldier. Stuart plays the part and sleeps with the woman, but is filled with guilt afterwards.
47	5	"Oh Brother Here Art Thou"	Andy Cadiff	Gary Murphy	December 3, 2014	405	0.45
Haskell's estranged brother Robert (Cameron Mathison) comes to town, wanting to mend their broken family bond. But Haskell soon learns that Robert has ulterior motives, as he needs Haskell to donate a kidney. Elsewhere, Holly mentors a high school student named Vanessa (Coco Jones) who is interested in the law. But when Vanessa instead expresses interest in Eden's legal assistant job, Holly inadvertently insults her friend by telling Vanessa she should aim higher.
48	6	"Dawn of the Dad"	Andy Cadiff	Steve Joe	December 10, 2014	406	0.70
Frank (Peter Onorati), the condescending father of Stuart and Nikki, is in town to celebrate their birthdays. Holly offers to throw them a party, mainly so she can invite J.D., a handsome Southerner she just met. But Holly's plans get threatened when Stuart and Frank quarrel, and Stuart calls off the party. Meanwhile, Haskell acquires what he assumes is a knock-off Rolex watch and sells it to Frank for $100, only to later discover it's a real Rolex.
49	7	"Catch It 'Cause You Can"	Andy Cadiff	Margee Magee & Angeli Millan	December 17, 2014	407	0.61
Haskell is being honored in an Akron, Ohio bowling alley for his accomplishments as a pro, while Phil brings home a stewardess (Keesha Sharp) from Haskell's upcoming flight during a layover. The flight is threatened when the stewardess learns that a passenger on her previous flight possibly had a serious virus, causing anyone who has contacted her to be quarantined. Meanwhile, Holly secretly rewrites one of Eden's college papers, and goes to visit the professor after the paper only earns Eden a B-minus.
50	8	"Requiem for a Dream"	Andy Cadiff	Ian Gurvitz	January 7, 2015	408	0.55
The gang all bid on items at a police charity auction. Haskell wins a ride-along in a police cruiser. While the first officer driving the car (Leslie David Baker) is nearing retirement and shuns any action, the second officer (Christopher Titus) scares Haskell to death. Phil wins a date with the actress who played "Mrs. Morgan" on a favorite TV show from his childhood. Meanwhile, Stuart and Holly fight over a cooking lesson by a famous chef, for very different reasons.
51	9	"Get Her to the Greek"	Andy Cadiff	Gary Murphy	January 14, 2015	409	0.60
Upon learning that Eden is pledging the same sorority that snubbed Holly for membership many years ago, Holly becomes determined to find out why she didn't get in. Haskell meets a woman at the bar who complains that her hotel overbooked the rooms and now she can't find a place to stay. Wanting to get closer to the woman, Haskell convinces her that his apartment doubles as an Airbnb, and he asks Stuart and Phil to pretend to be guests.
52	10	"Holly Franklin Goes to Washington"	Jeff Melman	Maria Brown-Gallenberg	January 21, 2015	410	0.68
Holly meets a Congressman named Charles (Matt Letscher) in Jamaica, and they hit it off. Charles' chief of staff Victoria (Rebecca Wisocky) wants to introduce Holly at his next public event, and asks Eden for some background information on Holly's career. Eden accidentally puts Holly's wedding folder in with the other info, and Victoria finds out her plans. She tells Eden that having a wife would give Charles a boost in his Senate run. Just after Eden finally gets the news to Holly at the event, Charles proposes. Holly accepts anyway.
53	11	"A Bride Too Far"	Jeff Melman	Howard Gewirtz	January 28, 2015	411	0.67
Nikki is having a party to celebrate her divorce being finalized. Holly wants to join the gang, but Victoria tells her she can only make a brief appearance due to an event that Charles has. Holly shows up and quickly attempts a "French leave", but regrets her decision and returns to the party. Charles and Victoria are upset the next morning when a newspaper photo shows Holly with the male stripper that Eden hired for Nikki. Holly realizes how drastically her life will change being married to someone in the public eye, and gives her engagement ring back to Charles. Meanwhile, Haskell tries to get Nikki to invest some of her divorce settlement money in an odd business venture.
54	12	"The Wedding"	Jeff Melman	Steve Joe	February 4, 2015	412	0.60
Holly decides to keep her wedding date at the posh banquet hall, and just make it a ceremony in which she marries herself. This confounds her friends and disappoints her mother (Judith Light), who came to town thinking Holly was still marrying Charles. Meanwhile, the "Pee Harmony" app that Haskell and Nikki started is doing surprisingly well...so well that an investor's attorney approaches them wanting to buy it.
55	13	"Him"	Terry Hughes	Mark Reisman	July 15, 2015	413	0.53
Deciding to embrace being alone, Holly becomes oddly attracted to "Eric", a smart speaker, among her wedding gifts that responds to her commands and questions. Meanwhile, Haskell starts to flaunt his newfound wealth, while Phil finds a way to coax expensive gifts out of his roommate.
56	14	"Finding Mr. Wrong"	Terry Hughes	Ian Gurvitz	July 22, 2015	414	0.42
Phil suggests that Holly ease her way back into the dating pool by "down dating" -- finding a man below her standard for sex only, with no chance of becoming attached. After spending a couple of nights with a plain, boring man named Fred, Holly still goes crazy when Fred stops calling or texting her. Meanwhile, Haskell is in a panic when he secretly hides a bunch of his cash in couch cushions, only to learn that Stuart bought a new couch and gave the old one to Goodwill.
57	15	"Good Will Hinting"	Terry Hughes	Gary Murphy	July 29, 2015	415	0.42
When a distant cousin (David Faustino) tracks down Haskell to ask for money, he worries that other Lutzes will follow and quickly has Holly draft a will. Holly is hurt when Haskell names Stuart and Phil as beneficiaries, while leaving her out. Elsewhere, Stuart asks Phil to take an open tenor position in his a capella group, The Sweatermen, but Phil soon learns that Stuart runs the group with an iron hand.
58	16	"The Forty Year Old Her-Gin"	Terry Hughes	Maria Brown-Gallenberg	August 5, 2015	416	0.34
Nikki returns from a vacation in Europe with a new French lover who, to everyone's shock, is a woman named Sophie (Brooke Lyons). Stuart is initially upset with Nikki, but soon changes his tune when he learns Sophie can get him into an exclusive pop-up restaurant event featuring the best chefs in New York. Meanwhile, Nikki's story inspires Holly to experiment with a lesbian relationship.
59	17	"Haskell Doesn't Live Here Anymore"	Terry Hughes	Gary Murphy & Maria Brown-Gallenberg	August 12, 2015	417	0.41
Stuart and Phil complain about Haskell completely taking over the apartment, so Haskell decides to move out. After a conversation with Holly, Stuart and Phil go to Haskell's new place to ask him to come back. However, they are so smitten with his posh penthouse apartment, they instead decide to move in with Haskell. As the boys prepare Holly for the shock, Haskell gets a visit from his financial manager (Bob Clendenin), who tells him he made some bad investments and the money is all gone.
60	18	"Knotting Phil"	Terry Hughes	Howard Gewirtz	August 19, 2015	418	0.41
Holly writes a scathing email to her firm's leadership after they leave her out of a partners meeting, with no intention of sending it, but she accidentally does. To her surprise, a senior partner (Geoff Pierson) agrees that they should include her more...and her first task in her expanded role is to fire someone. Elsewhere, Phil gets a gets a chance opportunity to play a sports agent in a movie and deliver a few lines, which means he gets to work with beautiful starlet Zoe Banks (Frances Turner).
61	19	"10 Things They Hate About You"	Terry Hughes	Steve Joe	August 26, 2015	419	0.35
Phil is so excited about his first date with Zoe that he contacts the Paparazzi, and it backfires on him. Holly gets involved in trying to fix things, but only makes the situation worse. Meanwhile, Haskell can't figure out why Stuart has so many more Twitter followers than him.
62	20	"Gone Girls"	Terry Hughes	Margee Magee & Angeli Millan	September 2, 2015	420	0.50
A handsome dermatologist named Dan (Robb Derringer) hits on both Holly and Nikki in the bar. The girls shun his advances to maintain the sanctity of "girls night out", but both secretly make appointments with him and go out on dates later. Elsewhere, Phil becomes concerned that he may just be a "boy toy" for Zoe, and Haskell surprisingly reveals he has experience in this area.
63	21	"What Dreams May Come"	Terry Hughes	Howard Gewirtz & Ian Gurvitz	September 9, 2015	422	0.36
When Stuart expresses regret that he never became a chef, Holly encourages him to follow his dreams. Stuart then shocks everyone by selling his dental practice and buying a run-down restaurant. Feeling guilty, Holly invests in the restaurant, becoming Stuart's partner. Meanwhile, a broke Haskell tries to get his ex, Margo, to hurry up and marry her current fiancée, thus relieving Haskell from paying alimony. After Margo finally sets a wedding date, however, Haskell realizes he still loves her.
64	22	"Along Came Holly"	Andy Cadiff	Mark Reisman & Steve Joe	September 16, 2015	421	0.42
With the new restaurant struggling to attract customers, Holly offers the outdoor patio area to Margo and her fiancée for their wedding, unaware that Haskell is still in love with Margo. Haskell credits his friends for helping him become "not the same man" than the one who was married to Margo before. Making matters more difficult for Haskell, Margo asks him to walk her down the aisle. In the end, Margo and Haskell realize they are right for each other and get married a second time.
