= The Exes season 2 =

The Exes
- Season 2
- No. of episodes: 12

Release
- Original network: TV Land
- Original release: June 20 – September 5, 2012

Season chronology
- ← Previous; Season 1 Next → Season 3

The second season of the TV Land's original sitcom The Exes premiered on June 20, 2012. A total of 12 episodes were produced for the second season. The series stars Donald Faison, Wayne Knight, Kristen Johnston, David Alan Basche and Kelly Stables.

== Cast ==
- Donald Faison as Phil Chase
- Wayne Knight as Haskell Lutz
- David Alan Basche as Stuart Gardner
- Kelly Stables as Eden Konkler
- Kristen Johnston as Holly Franklin

== Production ==
On February 2, 2012, TV Land renewed The Exes for a second season, set to premiere on June 20, 2012, at 10:30pm following The Soul Man. Season two was set to have 12 episodes, to coincide with the first season of The Soul Man.

In April 2012, People magazine reported that Kelly Stables (Eden) and husband Kurt Patino were expecting their first child, due in the fall. TV Land stated that her pregnancy will be written into the show. Guest stars for season two include, Kathleen Rose Perkins as Dr. Carol Thomas, Garcelle Beauvais as Kendra, James Morrison as Mr. Hubner, Holly's boss, Erin Matthews as Joan, Mr. Hubner's wife, Maksim Chmerkovskiy as Don, Janet Varney as Lorna, Stuart's ex-wife, Paula Jai Parker as Amelia, Michael Voltaggio as himself, Dot-Marie Jones, Amanda Detmer as Jill, Holly's sister, Zach Braff as Chuck Feeney, and Todd Stashwick as Grant, Phil's pretentious boss. Guest stars returning from the first season include: Diedrich Bader as Paul, Holly's co-worker/romantic interest, and Judith Light as Marjorie, Holly's mother.

== Episodes ==
No. overall	No. in season	Title	Directed by	Written by	Original release date	Prod. code	U.S. viewers (millions)
11	1	"Analyze Them"	Andy Cadiff	Boyce Bugliari & Jaime McLaughlin	June 20, 2012	202	1.24
When the guys have differences that they can't seem to resolve, Holly suggests that they go to a therapist (Kathleen Rose Perkins) for "couples" therapy. Holly's move backfires when it becomes apparent that she is the cause of their problems.
12	2	"What Women Want"	Andy Cadiff	Mark Reisman	June 27, 2012	201	0.92
Holly walks in on Stuart in the bathroom and discovers there is "more" to him than she thought, which affects the way she and the other guys see him.
13	3	"Cool Hand Lutz"	Andrew Weyman	Ian Gurvitz	July 4, 2012	203	0.74
Holly and Haskell go on a practice date. Stuart tries really hard to fit in with Phil's black friends and embarrasses himself in the process.
14	4	"Baby Mama"	Andy Cadiff	Joey Gutierrez	July 11, 2012	204	0.74
Chopin, the dog that Stuart lost custody of in his divorce, stays over. Phil then accidentally switches the dog with a lookalike, after having a one night stand with another dog owner. Holly suspects that Eden is having an affair with their married boss, Mr. Hubner (James Morrison), and is even more convinced when she discovers that Eden is pregnant.
15	5	"Lethal Weapons"	Andy Cadiff	Gary Murphy	July 18, 2012	205	0.79
Phil's desire to sign top mixed martial arts fighter Tommy Dunbar (Craig Gellis) as a client has the guys all attending a strip club, which lands Stuart in the hospital. Meanwhile, Eden buys Holly a new bra, which provides surprising benefits.
16	6	"Shall We Dance"	Andrew Weyman	Howard Gewirtz	July 25, 2012	206	0.92
Holly offers to help Stuart impress his ex-wife, Lorna (Janet Varney), at a ballroom dance contest, but it turns out Holly is no help at all. Adding insult to injury, it appears that Lorna and her partner (played by Dancing with the Stars pro Maksim Chmerkovskiy) are the favorites to win the competition. Meanwhile, Phil meets his female match, Kendra (Garcelle Beauvais), who beats him at his own game.
17	7	"Three Men and a Maybe"	Andy Cadiff	Yvette Lee Bowser	August 1, 2012	207	0.81
Holly starts to hear her biological clock ticking, so Phil, Stuart, Haskell and Eden help in her search for a sperm donor.
18	8	"How Holly Got Her Groove Back"	Andy Cadiff	Ian Gurvitz	August 8, 2012	208	0.91
Holly's continuing crush on her co-worker, Paul (Diedrich Bader), makes her determined to find out how he feels about her. Meanwhile, frustrated with being the only roommate who cleans the apartment, Stuart hires Amelia (Paula Jai Parker), a maid who begins to disrupt Haskell's life until they both become sexually intimate.
19	9	"The Party"	Andy Cadiff	Howard Gewirtz	August 15, 2012	209	0.97
Holly introduces her new boyfriend, Paul, to Stuart, Phil and Haskell, which doesn't go quite as planned. However, when the three roommates apologize to Paul, he decides to invite them to a great party. When Stuart goes to pick up the party passes at Paul's apartment, he discovers that Paul is still living with his ex-wife.
20	10	"Sister Act"	Andy Cadiff	Boyce Bugliari & Jaime McLaughlin	August 22, 2012	210	0.95
In an attempt to impress her "perfect" sister Jill (Amanda Detmer), Holly creates a new identity with Eden. That is until everything unravels when her mother, Majorie (Judith Light) also comes to town. Meanwhile, the guys get a "high" on Stuart's cooking.
21	11	"He's Gotta Have It"	Andy Cadiff	Gary Murphy	August 29, 2012	211	0.95
While hiding his client, tennis star Chuck Feeney (Zach Braff), from the paparazzi, Phil learns that this legendary ladies' man is more of a man's man instead. Holly and Haskell argue over who can take better care of a nine-months pregnant Eden.
22	12	"Pirates of the Care of Eden"	Andy Cadiff	Yvette Lee Bowser	September 5, 2012	212	0.93
Holly has a hard time telling Eden that she won't be able to be there for the birth. So to help cheer up Eden before delivering the bad news, Holly, Stuart and Haskell take Eden to a party on a yacht owned by Phil's boss, Grant (Todd Stashwick). Phil tells the group they must take a quick tour and leave, but Eden goes into labor and Holly helps her deliver a baby girl on the stateroom bed.
