= List of The Exes episodes =

The Exes is an American sitcom that premiered on November 30, 2011, on TV Land. The series follows divorce attorney Holly (Kristen Johnston) who introduces her client, Stuart (David Alan Basche), to two new roommates, Haskell (Wayne Knight) and Phil (Donald Faison), who are divorced men that share an apartment owned by Holly.

A total of 64 episodes of The Exes have aired, with the show concluding in the 4th season following cancellation by the network.

== Series overview ==
Season	Episodes	Originally released	
Season	Episodes	First released	Last released
1	10	November 30, 2011	February 1, 2012
2	12	June 20, 2012	September 5, 2012
3	20	June 19, 2013	February 26, 2014
4	22	November 5, 2014	September 16, 2015

== Episodes ==
=== Season 1 (2011–12) ===
No. overall	No. in season	Title	Directed by	Written by	Original release date	Prod. code	U.S. viewers (millions)
1	1	"Pilot"	Andy Cadiff	Mark Reisman	November 30, 2011	101	1.43
2	2	"A Little Romance"	Andy Cadiff	Ian Gurvitz	December 7, 2011	102	0.93
3	3	"Working Girl"	Andy Cadiff	Gary Murphy	December 14, 2011	106	1.18
4	4	"Lutz and the Real Girl"	Andy Cadiff	Howard Gewirtz	December 21, 2011	103	1.17
5	5	"An Inconvenient Tooth"	Andy Cadiff	Mark Reisman	December 28, 2011	104	1.46
6	6	"A Very Wrong Engagement"	Andy Cadiff	Howard Gewirtz	January 4, 2012	108	1.31
7	7	"Lost in Translation"	Andy Cadiff	Ian Gurvitz	January 11, 2012	107	1.23
8	8	"My Dinner with Phil"	Andy Cadiff	Sue Tenney	January 18, 2012	105	0.98
9	9	"When Holly Broke Kevin"	Andy Cadiff	Gary Murphy	January 25, 2012	110	0.93
10	10	"The Ex Always Rings Twice"	Andy Cadiff	Sue Tenney	February 1, 2012	109	1.18

=== Season 2 (2012) ===
No. overall	No. in season	Title	Directed by	Written by	Original release date	Prod. code	U.S. viewers (millions)
11	1	"Analyze Them"	Andy Cadiff	Boyce Bugliari & Jaime McLaughlin	June 20, 2012	202	1.24
12	2	"What Women Want"	Andy Cadiff	Mark Reisman	June 27, 2012	201	0.92
13	3	"Cool Hand Lutz"	Andrew Weyman	Ian Gurvitz	July 4, 2012	203	0.74
14	4	"Baby Mama"	Andy Cadiff	Joey Gutierrez	July 11, 2012	204	0.74
15	5	"Lethal Weapons"	Andy Cadiff	Gary Murphy	July 18, 2012	205	0.79
16	6	"Shall We Dance"	Andrew Weyman	Howard Gewirtz	July 25, 2012	206	0.92
17	7	"Three Men and a Maybe"	Andy Cadiff	Yvette Lee Bowser	August 1, 2012	207	0.81
18	8	"How Holly Got Her Groove Back"	Andy Cadiff	Ian Gurvitz	August 8, 2012	208	0.91
19	9	"The Party"	Andy Cadiff	Howard Gewirtz	August 15, 2012	209	0.97
20	10	"Sister Act"	Andy Cadiff	Boyce Bugliari & Jaime McLaughlin	August 22, 2012	210	0.95
21	11	"He's Gotta Have It"	Andy Cadiff	Gary Murphy	August 29, 2012	211	0.95
22	12	"Pirates of the Care of Eden"	Andy Cadiff	Yvette Lee Bowser	September 5, 2012	212	0.93

=== Season 3 (2013–14) ===
No. overall	No. in season	Title	Directed by	Written by	Original release date	Prod. code	U.S. viewers (millions)
23	1	"Toy Story"	Shelley Jensen	Mark Reisman	June 19, 2013	301	1.27
24	2	"The Holly's Buddies Story"	Jeff Melman	Gary Murphy	June 26, 2013	302	0.94
25	3	"Trading Places"	Andy Cadiff	Howard Gewirtz	July 10, 2013	304	0.89
26	4	"Zero Dark Forties"	Andy Cadiff	Ian Gurvitz	July 17, 2013	305	1.08
27	5	"Defending Your Wife"	Jeff Melman	Maria Brown-Gallenberg	July 24, 2013	303	1.00
28	6	"Take This Job and Shove It"	Andy Cadiff	Michael Glouberman	July 31, 2013	306	1.18
29	7	"Pretty Women"	Andy Cadiff	Mark Reisman	August 7, 2013	307	1.11
30	8	"Prelude to a Kiss"	Andy Cadiff	Ian Gurvitz	August 14, 2013	308	0.95
31	9	"The Hand That Robs the Cradle"	Andy Cadiff	Gary Murphy	August 21, 2013	309	1.27
32	10	"My Ex-Boyfriend's Wedding"	Andy Cadiff	Howard Gewirtz	August 28, 2013	310	1.22
33	11	"True Lies"	Terry Hughes	Mark Reisman	December 11, 2013	311	0.55
34	12	"How the Grinch Spent Xmas"	Terry Hughes	Gary Murphy	December 18, 2013	313	0.67
35	13	"Nothing in Common"	Shelley Jensen	Mark Reisman	January 1, 2014	314	0.88
36	14	"Bachelor Party"	Terry Hughes	Steve Joe	January 8, 2014	312	0.81
37	15	"Starting Over"	Shelley Jensen	Ian Gurvitz	January 22, 2014	315	0.78
38	16	"Friends Without Benefits"	Shelley Jensen	Gary Murphy	January 29, 2014	316	0.89
39	17	"Nun Like It Hot"	Jeff Melman	Maria Brown-Gallenberg	February 5, 2014	317	0.87
40	18	"When Haskell Met Sammy"	Jeff Melman	Howard Gewirtz	February 12, 2014	318	0.63
41	19	"My Fair Stuart"	Jeff Melman	Howard Gewirtz	February 19, 2014	319	0.67
42	20	"The Old Man and the Holly"	Rob Schiller	Maria Brown-Gallenberg	February 26, 2014	320	0.84

=== Season 4 (2014–15) ===
No. overall	No. in season	Title	Directed by	Written by	Original release date	Prod. code	U.S. viewers (millions)
43	1	"The Devil Wears Hanes"	Andy Cadiff	Mark Reisman	November 5, 2014	401	0.47
44	2	"The Wedding Unplanner"	Andy Cadiff	Ian Gurvitz	November 12, 2014	402	0.66
45	3	"Love and Death"	Andy Cadiff	Maria Brown-Gallenberg	November 19, 2014	403	0.50
46	4	"An Officer and a Dental Man"	Andy Cadiff	Howard Gewirtz	November 26, 2014	404	0.72
47	5	"Oh Brother Here Art Thou"	Andy Cadiff	Gary Murphy	December 3, 2014	405	0.45
48	6	"Dawn of the Dad"	Andy Cadiff	Steve Joe	December 10, 2014	406	0.70
49	7	"Catch It 'Cause You Can"	Andy Cadiff	Margee Magee & Angeli Millan	December 17, 2014	407	0.61
50	8	"Requiem for a Dream"	Andy Cadiff	Ian Gurvitz	January 7, 2015	408	0.55
51	9	"Get Her to the Greek"	Andy Cadiff	Gary Murphy	January 14, 2015	409	0.60
52	10	"Holly Franklin Goes to Washington"	Jeff Melman	Maria Brown-Gallenberg	January 21, 2015	410	0.68
53	11	"A Bride Too Far"	Jeff Melman	Howard Gewirtz	January 28, 2015	411	0.67
54	12	"The Wedding"	Jeff Melman	Steve Joe	February 4, 2015	412	0.60
55	13	"Him"	Terry Hughes	Mark Reisman	July 15, 2015	TBA	0.53
56	14	"Finding Mr. Wrong"	Terry Hughes	Ian Gurvitz	July 22, 2015	TBA	0.42
57	15	"Good Will Hinting"	Terry Hughes	Gary Murphy	July 29, 2015	TBA	0.42
58	16	"The Forty Year Old Her-Gin"	Terry Hughes	Maria Brown-Gallenberg	August 5, 2015	TBA	0.34
59	17	"Haskell Doesn't Live Here Anymore"	Terry Hughes	Gary Murphy & Maria Brown-Gallenberg	August 12, 2015	TBA	0.41
60	18	"Knotting Phil"	Terry Hughes	Howard Gewirtz	August 19, 2015	TBA	0.41
61	19	"10 Things They Hate About You"	Terry Hughes	Steve Joe	August 26, 2015	TBA	0.35
62	20	"Gone Girls"	Terry Hughes	Margee Magee & Angeli Millan	September 2, 2015	TBA	0.50
63	21	"What Dreams May Come"	Terry Hughes	Howard Gewirtz & Ian Gurvitz	September 9, 2015	TBA	0.36
64	22	"Along Came Holly"	Andy Cadiff	Mark Reisman & Steve Joe	September 16, 2015	TBA	0.42
