= Thrill ride =

Thrill ride or Thrill Ride may refer to

- Amusement ride
- 3-D Ultra Pinball: Thrill Ride
- Thrill Ride, the 4th book in The Hardy Boys Undercover Brothers series.
- Roller coaster
- Thrill Ride (film)
