= The Exes =

American television series (2011–2015)

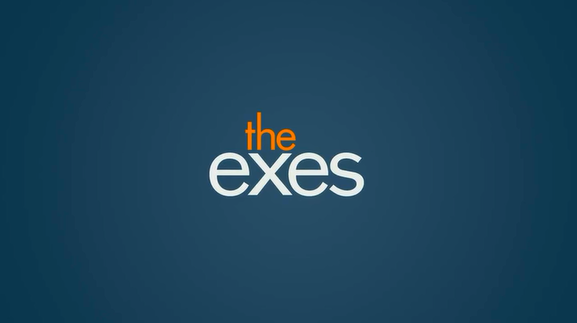
- Genre: Sitcom
- Created by: Mark Reisman
- Starring: Donald Faison; Wayne Knight; David Alan Basche; Kelly Stables; Kristen Johnston
- Composer: Gabriel Mann
- Country of origin: United States
- Original language: English
- No. of seasons: 4
- No. of episodes: 64 (list of episodes)

Production
- Executive producers: Mark Reisman; Franco E. Bario; Michael Hanel; Mindy Schultheis; Larry W. Jones; Keith Cox
- Camera setup: Multi-camera
- Running time: 22 minutes
- Production companies: Mark Reisman Productions; Acme Productions; TV Land Original Productions

Original release
- Network: TV Land
- Release: November 30, 2011 – September 16, 2015

The Exes is an American sitcom starring Donald Faison, Wayne Knight, David Alan Basche, Kelly Stables and Kristen Johnston. It debuted on TV Land on November 30, 2011, airing on Wednesday nights at 10:30 p.m. The series was created by Mark Reisman and follows three divorced men who live in a New York City apartment owned by their divorce lawyer.

In February 2014, TV Land renewed the series for a twelve-episode fourth season that premiered on November 5, 2014. Additional episodes were ordered before the season premiered. On August 10, 2015, the series was cancelled by TV Land with six episodes remaining in the fourth season. The network announced that all six episodes would air, with the finale airing September 16, 2015.

== Synopsis ==
Divorce attorney Holly (Kristen Johnston) introduces her client, Stuart (David Alan Basche), to his new roommates: two other divorced men who share an apartment in New York City that Holly owns. At first Phil (Donald Faison) and Haskell (Wayne Knight) have reservations about Stuart moving in, but Holly is right across the hall to help when things start to go downhill. When not hanging out in the apartment, the gang are usually downstairs at the local bar, joined by Holly's assistant, Eden (Kelly Stables).

== Cast and characters ==
- Donald Faison as Phil Chase, a sports agent and a womanizing divorced man. While seemingly focused only on his own carnal interests, he often reveals a sensitive and helpful side when it comes to supporting his roommates and Holly. In season 3 he dates Eden for a few episodes until they break up.
- Wayne Knight as Haskell Lutz, a lazy, divorced roommate of Phil's who makes a living selling various items on the internet. In season 2, it is revealed that he used to be a semi-successful professional bowler. In season 3 he develops an unrequited infatuation for Stuart's sister Nicki (a recurring character played by Leah Remini). In the series finale, he remarries his ex, Margo.
- David Alan Basche as Stuart Gardner, a successful dentist and recently divorced man who is trying to get over his feelings for his ex-wife. Holly introduces him to Phil and Haskell, and suggests that the three become roommates. Near the end of season 4, he realizes his dream of opening his own restaurant.
- Kelly Stables as Eden Konkler, Holly's legal assistant and best friend. She is a "party girl" who tries to get Holly to embrace the single life. In season 2, she briefly abandons her partying ways and becomes a surrogate mother for Holly's boss and his wife. In season 3 she dates Phil for a few episodes. In season 4, she returns to school to work toward a law degree.
- Kristen Johnston as Holly Franklin, a divorce attorney whose former clients and friends live across the hall in an apartment she owns. While often playing matchmaker for her divorced friends, she is also recently single (having broken off an engagement) and struggles to meet the right man.

== Episodes ==
Season	Episodes	Originally released	
Season	Episodes	First released	Last released
1	10	November 30, 2011	February 1, 2012
2	12	June 20, 2012	September 5, 2012
3	20	June 19, 2013	February 26, 2014
4	22	November 5, 2014	September 16, 2015

== Development and production ==
Season 1 and 3 intertitle for The Exes featuring the main cast

TV Land placed a pilot order on November 10, 2010. The series was created by Mark Reisman (Frasier), with the pilot directed by Andy Cadiff. The series is executive produced by Reisman, Franco Bario, Michael Hanel and Mindy Schultheis, alongside production companies Mark Reisman Productions and Acme Productions.

On March 21, 2011, the pilot was given a series order of ten episodes. The series premiered on November 30, 2011, and the first season aired on Wednesday nights at 10:30 pm, following Hot in Cleveland.

On February 2, 2012, TV Land announced that it had ordered a second season of The Exes. Season two premiered on June 20, 2012, at 10:30 pm following The Soul Man, On November 13, 2012, TV Land ordered an additional 10 episodes for the second season. However, on December 13, 2012, TV Land announced that the 10 additional episodes ordered will be considered the third season. Season three premiered on June 19, 2013, at 10:30 pm EST. On July 18, 2013, TV Land extended the episode order of season three to 20 episodes. The remaining episodes began airing on December 11, 2013.

On February 3, 2014, TV Land announced the fourth season renewal of The Exes with a 12-episode order. On September 5, 2014, TV Land announced that season four would be extended by 12 episodes, for a season total of 24. The fourth season premiered on November 5, 2014. The show was cancelled on August 10, 2015, with six produced episodes left to air, reducing season four to a total of 22 episodes.

=== Casting ===
Casting announcements began in January 2011. First to be cast were Kristen Johnston and Donald Faison, with Johnston playing Holly, a smart and sexy divorce attorney and the landlord, and Faison playing Phil Chase, a sports agent and charming ladies' man who lives in the apartment across the hall. Next actor cast in the series was David Alan Basche, who plays Stuart Gardner, a caring but neurotic cosmetic dentist who moves in with Faison's and Knight's characters. Wayne Knight was then cast in the role of Haskell Lutz, a perpetual couch potato who hawks merchandise on the Internet while living with the two men. This is the second sitcom Johnston and Knight have been regulars on together since 3rd Rock From the Sun.

== Critical reception ==
The first season received a 49 out of 100 on Metacritic, indicating mixed or average reviews, based on 14 critic reviews. On Rotten Tomatoes, season one holds a rating of 47%, based on 15 reviews, with an average rating 5.5./10. The site's critical consensus reads, "Though the cast is full of seasoned professionals and some of the content is humorous, The Exes feels churned out of a sitcom regeneration machine, introducing no new elements to the formula."

=== Awards and nominations ===
In 2013, Donald Faison was nominated for the NAACP Image Award for Outstanding Actor in a Comedy Series. On July 18, 2013, The Exes received a nomination for Outstanding Cinematography for a Multi-Camera Series at the 65th Primetime Emmy Awards. The series received the same nomination at the 66th Primetime Emmy Awards.

=== Ratings ===
Season	Timeslot (ET/PT)	# Ep.	Premiered		Ended		TV Season	Viewers (in millions)
Season	Timeslot (ET/PT)	# Ep.	Date	Premiere Viewers (in millions)	Date	Finale Viewers (in millions)	TV Season	Viewers (in millions)
1	Wednesday 10:30 pm	10	November 30, 2011	1.43	February 1, 2012	1.18	2011–2012	1.18
2	Wednesday 10:30 pm	12	June 20, 2012	1.24	September 5, 2012	0.93	2012	0.88
3	Wednesday 10:30 pm (June 19 – December 18, 2013); Wednesday 10:00 pm (January 1 – February 26, 2014)	20	June 19, 2013	1.27	February 26, 2014	0.84	2013–14	0.93
4	Wednesday 10:30 pm	22	November 5, 2014	0.47	September 16, 2015	0.42	2014–15	0.52

== International broadcast ==
On May 6, 2011, it was announced that Endemol would distribute The Exes internationally. The series is broadcast on SBS9 in the Netherlands, SABC in South Africa, Shaw TV in Canada, MTV in Latin America, Comedy Central in Brazil, TVNZ in New Zealand, FOX life in Bulgaria, CNBC-e from Turkey and Dubai, TV6 in Sweden, it is now also being telecast on Comedy Central India, and TLC in United Kingdom and Ireland.

== Syndication ==
The Exes aired on NickMom from July 26 to September 27, 2015

== Home media ==
The Exes: Season 1 & 2 was released on DVD in Region 1 on November 4, 2014. The three-disc set includes all 22 episodes from seasons one and two. Special features include interviews with Kristen Johnston, Donald Faison, David Alan Basche, Kelly Stables, Wayne Knight and director Andy Cadiff, and a behind-the-scenes featurette.
