= Extended Family (TV series) =

2023 American television sitcom

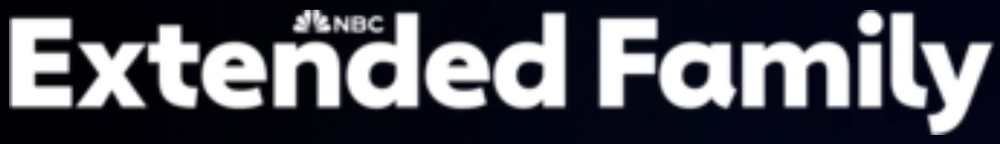
- Genre: Sitcom
- Created by: Mike O'Malley
- Starring: Jon Cryer; Donald Faison; Abigail Spencer; Sofia Capanna; Finn Sweeney
- Music by: Jeff Cardoni
- Opening theme: "We Thought We Were Done" by Buffalo Tom
- Country of origin: United States
- Original language: English
- No. of seasons: 1
- No. of episodes: 13

Production
- Executive producers: Mike O'Malley; Victor Levin; Victoria Morrow; Jon Cryer; James Widdoes; Wyc Grousbeck; Emilia Fazzalari; George Geyer; Tom Werner
- Producer: Barbara Brace
- Cinematography: Donald A. Morgan
- Editors: Russell Griffin, ACE; Brian Schnuckel
- Camera setup: Multi-camera
- Running time: 20–22 minutes
- Production companies: O'Malley Ink; Werner Entertainment; Lionsgate Television; Universal Television

Original release
- Network: NBC
- Release: December 23, 2023 – March 26, 2024

Extended Family is an American television sitcom created by Mike O'Malley that premiered on NBC on December 23, 2023, and concluded on March 26, 2024. It is loosely based on the lives of co-executive producers George Geyer, Emilia Fazzalari and Boston Celtics owner Wyc Grousbeck. In May 2024, the series was canceled after one season.

== Premise ==
Jim and Julia, after an amicable divorce, decide to continue to raise their kids at the family home while taking turns on who gets to stay with them. Navigating the waters of divorce and child-sharing gets more complicated for Jim when Trey, the owner of his favorite sports team, enters the picture and wins Julia's heart.

== Cast ==
=== Main ===
- Jon Cryer as Jim Kearney Sr.
- Donald Faison as Trey Taylor, Julia's fiancé and owner of the Boston Celtics
- Abigail Spencer as Julia Kearney, Jim's ex-wife
- Sofia Capanna as Grace Kearney, Jim and Julia's daughter
- Finn Sweeney as Jim "Jimmy" Kearney Jr., Jim and Julia's son

=== Recurring ===
- Lenny Clarke as Bobby Kearney, Jim's father

=== Guest stars ===
- Rick Fox as Kevin Kelly, GM of the Boston Celtics
- Stephen McKinley Henderson as Dr. Eldridge Davenport
- Billy Gardell as Bill
- Erica Ash as Lydia
- Missy Yager as Thea-Lyn
- Neal McDonough as Officer Schramn
- Rico E. Anderson as Officer Franks
- Malcolm Kelner as Sean Bell
- Korbin Marum as Derek
- Iqbal Theba as Dr. Mullen
- Walter Belenky as Mr. Tarmy
- Dmitrious Bistrevsky as Yuri Kobilska
- Nicholas Turturro as Petey D.
- Charles Parnell as Governor Devon Monohan
- Nancy Lenehan as Rose
- Kelly Stables as Kate Mackey
- Robert Cicchini as Tony Rizzo
- Andrea Anders as Kristin
- Joel Murray as Danny Walsh
- Caroline Rhea as Lana Telsoup
- Paul Pierce as Himself

== Episodes ==
| No. | Title | Directed by | Written by | Original release date | U.S. viewers (millions) | Rating/share (18-49) |
|---|---|---|---|---|---|---|
| 1 | "Pilot" | James Widdoes | Mike O'Malley | December 23, 2023 | 3.57 | 0.71/10 |
| 2 | "The Consequences of Making Yourself at Home" | Ali LeRoi | Jim Vallely | January 2, 2024 | 3.33 | 0.33/4 |
| 3 | "The Consequences of Gaming" | James Widdoes | Ajay Sahgal | January 9, 2024 | 2.76 | 0.27/3 |
| 4 | "The Consequences of Sushi" | James Widdoes | Victor Levin | January 16, 2024 | 2.63 | 0.26/3 |
| 5 | "The Consequences of Matchmaking" | James Widdoes | Victoria Morrow | January 23, 2024 | 2.44 | 0.23/2 |
| 6 | "The Consequences of Status" | James Widdoes | Mike O'Malley | January 30, 2024 | 2.45 | 0.23/3 |
| 7 | "The Consequences of Sleepovers" | Jeff Greenstein | Victoria Morrow | February 6, 2024 | 2.56 | 0.22/2 |
| 8 | "The Consequences of Loaning Your Dad Money" | Jeff Greenstein | Ajay Sahgal | February 13, 2024 | 2.27 | 0.23/2 |
| 9 | "The Consequences of Helping People" | James Widdoes | Victor Levin | February 20, 2024 | 1.94 | 0.23/3 |
| 10 | "The Consequences of Familial Obligations" | Phill Lewis | Laura Kightlinger | March 5, 2024 | 2.29 | 0.25/3 |
| 11 | "The Consequences of Writing Things Down" | Kim Fields | Jim Vallely & Maggie Rowe | March 12, 2024 | 2.55 | 0.25/3 |
| 12 | "The Consequences of Being Irish" | James Widdoes | Phil LaMarr | March 19, 2024 | 2.34 | 0.24/3 |
| 13 | "The Consequences of Considering the Consequences" | Gail Lerner | Victor Levin | March 26, 2024 | 2.35 | 0.25/3 |

== Production ==
Extended Family was given a series order on September 29, 2022. Production of the first season was interrupted by the 2023 SAG-AFTRA strike. Prior to the strike, 6 episodes of the 13 episode first season were filmed, with the series being one of the first to return to production after the strike. The series was filmed at Radford Studio Center in Studio City, California, but it is set in Boston, Massachusetts. On May 7, 2024, NBC canceled the series after one season.

== Release ==
Extended Family premiered on December 23, 2023, on NBC.

== Reception ==
The review aggregator website Rotten Tomatoes reported a 33% approval rating based on 6 critic reviews.
