= Lucas Jade Zumann =

American actor (born 2000)

- Born: December 12, 2000 (age 25); Chicago, Illinois, U.S.
- Occupations: Actor, Singer
- Years active: 2015–present

Lucas Jade Zumann (born December 12, 2000) is an American actor. He played Milo in the horror film Sinister 2, Jamie Fields in the indie film 20th Century Women and Gilbert Blythe in Anne with an E.

== Personal life ==
Lucas Jade Zumann was born on December 12, 2000, in Chicago, Illinois. He grew up in the neighborhood of Rogers Park. He is the oldest of two brothers and a sister. He is Jewish and attended Hebrew school. He attended Waters Elementary School, and then in fifth grade moved to the Chicago Waldorf School until eighth grade. He later returned to complete his senior year in 2019.

He discovered his passion for performing arts at an early age, participating in local theater productions, including a role in the ensemble of Oliver! with Music Theatre Works (formally Light Opera Works) in 2012. This early exposure to acting paved the way for his future in film and television.

== Career ==
Zumann made his motion picture debut as the malevolent ghost Milo in the horror film Sinister 2 (2015). He then played Henry Perry in the independent adventure flick Thrill Ride (2016).

Zumann portrayed Jamie Fields in the Oscar-nominated 20th Century Women (2016) alongside Annette Bening, Greta Gerwig, Billy Crudup, and Elle Fanning. Zumann brought depth and vulnerability to the role, earning praise for his nuanced depiction of a boy coming of age amidst a cast of strong, influential women.

He depicted Gilbert Blythe on the Canadian television series Anne with an E (2017-2019). Zumann portrayed Nathan Daldry/A in the teen rom-com movie Every Day (2018) opposite Angourie Rice. Zumann later played Jeff Owings in the 1960s set drama To the Stars (2019).

In 2021, he took on one of his most challenging roles as James Whitman in Dr. Bird's Advice for Sad Poets. Zumann's performance was lauded as "raw" and "emotionally resonant," with critics highlighting his ability to navigate the complexities of anxiety, grief, and self-discovery with sensitivity and depth.

Zumann made a cameo in the Netflix series Sense8 (2015) and in Season 4 of NBC's Chicago Fire (2016).

== Filmography ==
=== Film ===
Year	Title	Role	Notes
2015	Sinister 2	Milo Jacobs	
2016	20th Century Women	Jamie Fields	
2016	Thrill Ride	Henry Perry	
2018	Every Day	Nathan/A	
2019	To the Stars	Jeff Owings	
2021	Dr. Bird's Advice for Sad Poets	James Whitman	
2025	No Address	Jimmy	

=== Television ===
Year	Title	Role	Notes
2015	Sense8	Punk #2	Episode: "Death Doesn't Let You Say Goodbye"
2016	Chicago Fire	Lucas Hicks	2 episodes
2017–19	Anne with an E	Gilbert Blythe	Main role
