= To the Stars (film) =

2019 drama film

- Official poster
- Directed by: Martha Stephens
- Written by: Shannon Bradley-Colleary
- Produced by: Gavin Dorman; Stacy Jorgensen; Erik Rommesmo; Kristin Mann; Laura D. Smith
- Starring: Kara Hayward; Liana Liberato; Shea Whigham; Jordana Spiro; Lucas Jade Zumann; Adelaide Clemens; Malin Åkerman; Tony Hale
- Cinematography: Andrew Reed
- Edited by: Nathan Whiteside
- Music by: Heather McIntosh
- Production companies: Northern Lights Films; Foton Pictures; Rockhill Media; Prowess Pictures; Bending Light
- Distributed by: Samuel Goldwyn Films
- Release dates: January 25, 2019 (Sundance); April 24, 2020 (United States)
- Running time: 109 minutes
- Country: United States
- Language: English

To the Stars is a 2019 American drama film directed by Martha Stephens from a screenplay by Shannon Bradley-Colleary. It stars Kara Hayward, Liana Liberato, Shea Whigham, Jordana Spiro, Lucas Jade Zumann, Adelaide Clemens, Malin Åkerman and Tony Hale.

It had its world premiere at the Sundance Film Festival on January 25, 2019. It was released on April 24, 2020, by Samuel Goldwyn Films.

== Plot ==
Iris Deerborne is a teenager living in a rural Oklahoma town in 1960. The shy and mousey Iris is emotionally abused by her mother Francie, who wishes her daughter were more glamorous. At school she is bullied by many of the other kids, especially popular but insecure "queen bee" of the school Clarissa Dell. Iris shares a mutual attraction with Jeff Owings, a fellow student who works for her father, but is too shy to act on her feelings. Iris frequently sneaks out at night to swim in a local pond, wishing that she could "disappear".

One day, while walking to school, Iris is accosted by several boys. They are chased off by Maggie Richmond, a new girl in town who throws rocks at them until they leave. At school the other girls are intrigued by the conventionally pretty Maggie who piques their interest by telling them her father is a glamorous photographer for Life magazine who has photographed movie stars and dignitaries. That night, Iris finds Maggie swimming in the pond. Maggie admits that her father is not a glamour photographer, but instead works for an agricultural trade publication. When Maggie returns home, her stern father beats her for being out late. The family had moved to this small town to escape trouble caused by Maggie's behavior in the past.

Iris and Maggie become fast friends and Maggie has them skip school so they can get makeovers, including new hairdos from the local stylist Hazel Atkins. Iris' new looks and more confident attitude begin to gain her more acceptance from the girls in her school, most of whom are obsessed with finding dates to the upcoming school dance. At the dance, Iris finally gets the nerve to dance with Jeff, surprising the rest of the girls. Later, Maggie's family is thrilled to find out that she has been asked to the prom by popular football player Craig Butler. Maggie's mother takes her out dress shopping for the occasion. Maggie then visits Hazel Atkins for a new hairdo. Maggie learns that the photograph which everyone believes to be Hazel's dead husband is really her brother. After sharing a tender moment, Hazel sensually touches Maggie's cheek. Maggie warms to Hazel's touch, but suddenly flees. She finds Craig Butler and has sex with him that night by the pond. Afterwards, a distraught Maggie goes to see Iris, and drunkenly kisses her before apologizing and running away.

The next day, Iris learns that Craig has given Maggie a promise ring. Maggie invites the other girls and their dates to go skinny dipping in the pond, angering Iris who considered the pond their special place. Iris and Maggie have a big fight, where Iris accuses Maggie of lying to everyone else and not being herself. Maggie, in turn, derides Iris with the "stinky drawers" nickname the other kids bullied her with. Ashamed of what she's done and the people she's with, Maggie flees to Hazel's house. The two kiss and Maggie enters. Late that night, one of the girls comes by Hazel's to pick up a hair product meant for her mother. Through the window curtains she sees Hazel and Maggie having sex. She hurries home hysterically and tells her parents. The lesbian behavior between Hazel and Maggie quickly circulates among the locals. A group of men vandalize Hazel's car, threaten her, and she leaves town. Maggie's father beats her again, then breaks down in tears over his idealized image of his daughter. Maggie apologizes to her parents, tells them that they won't have to worry about her anymore and flees into the night.

The next morning, Iris learns about what happened. She finds Maggie's father and the police by the pond, a place locally known as the site where Jeff's mother committed suicide. A distraught Gerald Richmond asks Iris to tell Maggie to come home and that he doesn't care about her being "bad" anymore. Iris stands up for Maggie and tells him that she was never "bad". The police are unable to find Maggie, either alive or dead. When a group of boys harass Iris on the road again, she throws stones at them to chase them off, just like Maggie did. When she hears her mother gossiping with a friend, Iris insists that Maggie isn't dead, and that she has fled far beyond the reach of the narrow-minded townsfolk. She then informs her mother that she is going on her first date with a boy. Iris and Jeff kiss by the pond and then go swimming.

== Cast ==
- Kara Hayward as Iris Deerborne
- Liana Liberato as Maggie Richmond
- Jordana Spiro as Francie Deerborne
- Shea Whigham as Hank Deerborne
- Malin Åkerman as Grace Richmond
- Tony Hale as Gerald Richmond
- Lucas Jade Zumann as Jeff Owings
- Adelaide Clemens as Hazel Atkins
- Madisen Beaty as Clarissa Dell
- Sophi Bairley as Hattie McCoy
- Lauren Ashley Stephenson as Rhonda Robertson
- Matt Coulson as Craig Butler

== Production ==
In June 2018, it was announced Kara Hayward, Liana Liberato, Malin Åkerman, Shea Whigham, Tony Hale, Lucas Jade Zumann, Adelaide Clemens and Jordana Spiro had joined the cast of the film, with Martha Stephens directing from a screenplay by Shannon Bradley-Colleary. Kristin Mann, Laura D. Smith, Erik Rommesmo, Carlos Cuscò, Emerson Machtus, Kerri Elder and Black Elder will serve as producers and executive producers, respectively, under their Northern Lights Films, Foton Pictures and Rockhill Media banners, respectively.

=== Filming ===
Principal photography concluded in June 2018, in Oklahoma. The film was shot simultaneously in black-and-white and color.

== Release ==
It had its world premiere at the Sundance Film Festival on January 25, 2019. In October 2019, Samuel Goldwyn Films acquired distribution rights to the film. It was released on April 24, 2020.

== Critical response ==
On Rotten Tomatoes the film has an approval rating of 82% based on 60 reviews, with an average rating of 6.6/10. The site's critical consensus reads, "Its reach may occasionally exceed its grasp, but To the Stars uses its period setting as an effective backdrop for an insightful look at female friendship." On Metacritic, the film has a score of 60 out of 100, based on reviews from 15 critics, indicating "mixed or average reviews".
