= Dr. Bird's Advice for Sad Poets =

- Poster
- Directed by: Yaniv Raz
- Written by: Yaniv Raz
- Based on: Dr. Bird's Advice for Sad Poets by Evan Roskos
- Produced by: Shona Tuckman; Josh Bachove
- Starring: Lucas Jade Zumann; Taylor Russell; Chase Stokes; Lisa Edelstein; David Arquette; Jason Isaacs
- Cinematography: Pierluigi Gigi Malavasi
- Edited by: Steven Centracchio
- Music by: Jim Dooley
- Production companies: Ketchup Entertainment; Storyboard Media; Kreate Films
- Distributed by: Relativity Media
- Release date: January 12, 2021
- Running time: 110 minutes
- Country: United States
- Languages: English; French

Dr. Bird's Advice for Sad Poets is a 2021 American comedy-drama film written and directed by Yaniv Raz and starring Lucas Jade Zumann, Taylor Russell, Chase Stokes, Lisa Edelstein, David Arquette and Jason Isaacs. It is based on the novel of the same name by Evan Roskos.

== Cast ==
- Lucas Jade Zumann as James Whitman
- Taylor Russell as Sophie
- Jason Isaacs as Carl
- Lisa Edelstein as Elly
- David Arquette as Xavier
- Chase Stokes as Martin
- Tom Wilkinson as the voice of Dr. Bird

== Release ==
The film was released on demand on January 12, 2021.

== Reception ==
The film has an 80% rating on Rotten Tomatoes based on five reviews.

Sandie Angulo Chen of Common Sense Media awarded the film three stars out of five and wrote, "YA dramedy about anxiety has language, innuendo, drinking."

Cath Clarke of The Guardian also awarded the film three stars out of five and wrote, "The family dysfunction stuff is sensitively handled with some originality..."

Cyntia Vinney of Comic Book Resources gave the film a positive review and wrote, "None of this would land, however, if it weren’t for Zumann’s earnest, heartfelt performance. He perfectly balances James' anxiety with his underlying sweetness as well as his awkward idiosyncrasy."

Glenn Kenny of The New York Times gave the film a negative review and wrote, "The movie gets so drunk on its stylistic affectations (and unfunny attempts at cerebral comedy) that by the time it sobers up to take James's mental health seriously, it's too little, too late."
