= Thrill Ride (film) =

- Film poster
- Directed by: Chris Parrish
- Written by: Chris Parrish
- Story by: Mason Parrish
- Produced by: Chris Parrish; Angie Gaffney
- Starring: Kristen Johnston; Lucas Jade Zumann; Tim Kazurinsky
- Production company: Mason's Movies
- Distributed by: Gravitas Ventures
- Release date: December 12, 2017
- Running time: 86 minutes
- Country: United States
- Language: English

Thrill Ride is a 2017 American adventure comedy film directed by Chris Parrish and starring Kristen Johnston, Lucas Jade Zumann and Tim Kazurinsky.

== Cast ==
- Kristen Johnston
- Lucas Jade Zumann as Henry
- Tim Kazurinsky
- Tim Decker
- Helen Sadler
- Nicole Scimeca
- John Babbo
- Tori Waite
- David Elizabeth Baker

== Production ==
The film was shot in Chicago and Woodstock, Illinois. Principal photography wrapped in December 2014.

== Release ==
The film was released on DVD, streaming, and video-on-demand on December 12, 2017.

== Reception and awards ==
Andrea Beach of Common Sense Media awarded the film two stars out of five.

The film won Best Feature Film at the 2017 Gen Con Film Festival, Best Science Fiction/Fantasy Film at the Burbank International Film Festival and Best Family Feature at Buffalo Dreams Fantastic Film Festival. The film was also nominated for Best American Independent Feature Film at the Cleveland International Film Festival and Best Narrative Feature Film at the Hollywood Film Festival.
