= Franco Bario =

American television line producer

- Occupation: Television producer
- Years active: 1987–present

Franco E. Bario is an American television line producer.

== Career ==
Bario produced the NBC situation comedies Saved by the Bell from 1990 to 1993, Saved by the Bell: The New Class from 1993 to 1995, and Saved by the Bell: The College Years from 1993 to 1994. He also produced the 1992 television movie Saved by the Bell: Hawaiian Style, and the series California Dreams from 1992 to 1996. Bario next did the ABC comedy Grace Under Fire from 1996 to 1998, followed by the first season of Fox's That '70s Show from 1998 to 1999. He later produced Living With Fran for The WB from 2005 to 2006, and Lifetime's Rita Rocks from 2008 to 2009.
