= Kelly Stables =

American actress

- Born: Kelly Michelle Stables; January 26, 1978 (age 48); St. Louis, Missouri, U.S.
- Education: University of Missouri
- Occupation: Actress
- Years active: 2000–present
- Spouse: Kurt Patino (m. 2005)
- Children: 2

Kelly Michelle Stables (born January 26, 1978) is an American actress. She is known for her television roles, such as Melissa on Two and a Half Men (2008–2010), Eden Konkler on The Exes (2011–2015), and Kelly Watson on Superstore (2017–2021), as well as for her voice acting roles as Will Vandom in the animated adaptation of the comic series W.I.T.C.H. (2004–2006) and Arrowette in Young Justice (2019, 2021). She also had roles in films The Ring Two (2005), Horrible Bosses 2 (2014) and Holiday Twist (2023).

== Early life ==
Kelly Michelle Stables was born on January 26, 1978, in St. Louis, Missouri. She graduated from Lafayette High School, where she was a cheerleader, prom queen and senior class president. Stables graduated from the University of Missouri in Columbia, earning a bachelor's degree in Communication with an emphasis in Television and a minor in Theatre Performance. While at the University of Missouri she was a member of Delta Gamma. In March 2000, she moved to Los Angeles to pursue an acting career.

== Career ==
=== 2000–2010: Early acting roles and breakthrough with The Ring films ===
Upon arriving in Los Angeles, Stables started working as an extra, including playing a monkey on the adventure film Planet of the Apes (2001), directed by Tim Burton. Early in her career, Stables did stunt work for films The Ring (2002), Spider-Man (2002) and The Princess Diaries 2: Royal Engagement (2004). Stables also starred in a number of plays. Her two largest theatrical roles were in the Thousand Oaks Civic Light Opera's production of Peter Pan as Wendy, and in Sleeping Beauty as the title character. She has also played several other stage roles, most notably that of Marion Davies in W.R. and the Daisy. She briefly appeared in the unaired pilot for The Grubbs (2002). Stables subsequently landed roles in films The Haunted Mansion (2003), Pride & Prejudice: A Latter-Day Comedy (2003) and Bring It On Again (2004). She voiced the role of Will Vandom on ABC's animated television series W.I.T.C.H. (2004–2006).

She replaced actress Daveigh Chase in the role of Samara Morgan for short film Rings (2005) and the supernatural horror film The Ring Two (2005). The Ring Two received generally mixed reviews from critics and grossed $164 million at the box office worldwide. For her role as Samara, it took five and a half hours to get her makeup done and over an hour to take off the makeup. Her performance in The Ring films significantly elevated her profile, attracting attention and earning her recognition in prominent publications such as Rolling Stone and Variety. After The Ring Two, Stables quit her full-time job in accounting at a theater company, saying: "It wasn't until The Ring 2 that I stopped my day job, so to speak. I did accounting at a theater company when I first moved here, and then after that, I did the bookkeeping for a small production company. I definitely had to have that source of income. I knew I couldn't wait tables because I'm not strong enough to hold those big trays, and plus, I'm so short that they would be hitting people as I walked past them."

She guest-starred on Fox's sitcom 'Til Death (2006) as a travel agent Sandi, and on CBS' sitcom How I Met Your Mother (2006) as a masseuse. In November 2007, Stables played a 12-year old cavekid boy, Rocky the Cave Kid on ABC's sitcom Cavemen, in the episode "Cave Kid". She had a recurring role as Janette on ABC Family's comedy drama series Greek (2007–2009). Her character Janette was the former vice-president of Judicial for Pan-Hellenic and a sister at Gamma Psi, and eventually left to focus on her studies.

Stables had a recurring role as Alan Harper's receptionist Melissa in the sixth, seventh and eighth seasons of CBS' sitcom Two and a Half Men (2008–2010). Melissa had an on-again, off-again relationship with Alan, played by Jon Cryer. She appeared in a Burger King "King Value Network" (2009) commercial campaign as a woman who is selling things on infomercials, and portrayed a businesswoman in a 7 Up (2010) commercial alongside Brad Garrett. In 2010, she co-starred on the short-lived ABC sitcom Romantically Challenged playing Lisa Thomas, Alyssa Milano's character's sister. Stables' character Lisa is the "sexpert" of the group offering often unwanted advice. On May 16, 2010, ABC canceled the series; six episodes were produced, but only four aired.

=== 2011–present: Success with The Exes and Superstore ===
In 2011, she landed one of the main roles as legal assistant Eden Konkler on TV Land's sitcom The Exes (2011–2015). Her character Eden is a party girl, who later becomes a surrogate mother. The writers of The Exes wrote Stables' real-life pregnancy into the series' storyline. The series ran for four seasons, with the series finale airing September 16, 2015. She appeared in the comedy film Horrible Bosses 2 (2014) as Rachel, who is part of the Good Morning LA crew. The film was a commercial success, and grossed $107.7 million at the worldwide box office. Stables joined the cast of The CW's comedy drama television series No Tomorrow (2016), playing Mary Anne, the sister of the main character, Evie.

Stables then landed a recurring role on the third season of the NBC television series Superstore in 2017. She portrayed Kelly Watson, a new sales associate at the fictional department store Cloud 9. Kelly eventually becomes the love interest of Jonah Simms, played by Ben Feldman, and they move in together. Stables described her character Kelly Watson by saying: "I think Kelly is just an optimistic person. She likes to have a good time, she likes to laugh, she likes to enjoy herself wherever she goes. And I think Jonah — they bring that out in each other."

She had voice roles on the DC Universe superhero animated seriesYoung Justice (2019, 2021) as Arrowette, and as Mouse in the fantasy adventure film Dolittle (2020). She had a lead role as a workaholic CEO, Connie in the Christmas comedy film Holiday Twist (2023).

== Personal life ==
In March 2005, Stables married manager Kurt Patino. They have two sons together, born in 2012 and 2015.

== Filmography ==
=== Film ===
| Year | Title | Role | Notes |
|---|---|---|---|
| 2001 | Planet of the Apes | Extra Monkey | Uncredited |
| 2002 | The Grubbs | Young Sophine | |
| 2003 | The Haunted Mansion | Queen Ghost | |
| 2003 | Pride & Prejudice: A Latter-Day Comedy | Lydia Meryton | |
| 2004 | Bring It On Again | Tiny Blonde | |
| 2005 | Hoodwinked! | Schnitzel Kid 1 | Voice role |
| 2005 | Rings | Samara Morgan | Short film |
| 2005 | The Ring Two | Samara Morgan | |
| 2006 | Furnace | Karen Bolding | |
| 2006 | Telling Lies | Eve Forrester | |
| 2006 | State's Evidence | Emily Carter | |
| 2007 | Aliens vs. Predator: Requiem | | Voice role |
| 2008 | Together Again for the First Time | Sandra Frobisher | |
| 2009 | Dragon Hunter | Raya | |
| 2009 | Soul Fire Rising | Eve | Also as producer |
| 2009 | My Life: Untitled | Ollie | |
| 2010 | Ramona and Beezus | Voice cast | |
| 2012 | Should've Been Romeo | Sara | |
| 2012 | Zambezia | Gossip Bird 1 | Voice role |
| 2012 | Love and Germophobia | Additional voices | Voice role |
| 2013 | Cloudy with a Chance of Meatballs 2 | Additional voices | Voice role |
| 2014 | Tom and Jerry: The Lost Dragon | Athena / Puffy | Voice role |
| 2014 | Horrible Bosses 2 | Rachel | |
| 2015 | Kung Fu Panda: Secrets of the Scroll | Mother Bunny | Voice role |
| 2019 | Lady and the Tramp | Additional voices | Voice role |
| 2020 | Dolittle | Mouse | Voice role |
| 2023 | Holiday Twist | Connie | |
| 2023 | Godzilla Minus One | Additional voices | English dub |
| 2024 | Unfrosted | Additional voices | Voice role |
| 2025 | Dog Man | Harold Hutchins | Voice role |
| 2025 | The Bad Guys 2 | Maureen | Voice role (US version) |

=== Television ===
| Year | Title | Role | Notes |
|---|---|---|---|
| 2002 | BS | Molly | Television film |
| 2003 | General Hospital | Teenage Bobbie Spencer | Episode: "No. 10430" |
| 2004–2006 | W.I.T.C.H. | Will Vandom | Main voice role |
| 2006 | 'Til Death | Sandi | Episode: "The Courtship of Eddie's Parents" |
| 2006 | How I Met Your Mother | Masseuse | Episode: "Drumroll, Please" |
| 2007 | Shorty McShorts' Shorts | Digit | Episode: "Too Many Robots;" voice |
| 2007 | Cavemen | Rocky the Cave Kid | Episode: "Cave Kid" |
| 2007–2009 | Greek | Janette | Recurring role, 8 episodes |
| 2008 | The Bold and the Beautiful | Beauty Salon Attendant | 2 episodes |
| 2008 | Life | Marielle | Episode: "Crushed" |
| 2008–2010 | Two and a Half Men | Melissa | Recurring role; 10 episodes |
| 2009 | Santa Baby 2: Christmas Maybe | Teri/Phoebe the Elf | Television film |
| 2010 | Romantically Challenged | Lisa Thomas | Main role |
| 2010 | Bones | Cynthia Rinaldi | Episode: "The Bones That Weren't" |
| 2011–2015 | The Exes | Eden Konkler | Main role; 64 episodes |
| 2011 | Mad Love | Claire | Episode: "To Munsch or Not to Munsch" |
| 2011 | Hung | —N/a | Episode: "Don't Give Up on Detroit or Hung Like a Horse" |
| 2011 | A Golden Christmas 2: The Second Tail | Kelly | Television film; aka. 3 Holiday Tails |
| 2013 | Baby Daddy | Kayla | 2 episodes |
| 2015 | Sofia the First | Saffron | Voice role; episode: "Minimus is Missing" |
| 2015 | Mom | Kathy | Episode: "Sick Popes and a Red Ferrari" |
| 2016 | No Tomorrow | Mary Anne | Recurring role; 4 episodes |
| 2017 | Speechless | Candace | Episode: "W-E-WE'RE B-A-BACK!" |
| 2017–2021 | Superstore | Kelly Watson | Recurring role (seasons 3–6); 23 episodes |
| 2017–2018 | Malibu Dan the Family Man | Kate Marshall | Recurring role |
| 2018 | Get Shorty | Brooklyn McGowan-Hughes | Episode: "We'll Let You Know" |
| 2019, 2021 | Young Justice | Arrowette / Cissie King-Jones | Voice role; episodes: "Triptych", "Tale of Two Sisters" |
| 2021 | NCIS | Astrid Fellowes | Episode: "False Start” |
| 2024 | Extended Family | Kate Mackey | Episode: "The Consequences of Helping People" |

=== Video games ===
| Year | Title | Role | Notes |
|---|---|---|---|
| 2006 | Tony Hawk's Downhill Jam | Generic Female Skater | Voice role |
| 2008 | The Hardy Boys: The Hidden Theft | Iola | Voice role |
| 2013 | Lightning Returns: Final Fantasy XIII | Additional voices | Voice role |
| 2016 | Let It Die | Naomi Detex | Voice role |

=== Radio ===
| Year | Title | Role | Notes |
|---|---|---|---|
| 2011–2026 | Adventures in Odyssey | Olivia Parker / Molly Trent | Voice |

=== Other credits ===
| Year | Title | Role | Notes |
|---|---|---|---|
| 2002 | Spider-Man | Stunts | Film; uncredited |
| 2002 | The Ring | Stunts | Film |
| 2004 | The Princess Diaries 2: Royal Engagement | Stunts | Film |
| 2006 | She's the Man | ADR Performer | Film |
| 2007 | The Jane Austen Book Club | ADR Loop Group | Film |
| 2011 | Rango | ADR Group | Film |
| 2011 | Beastly | Loop Group | Film |
| 2011 | Warrior | ADR Walla Group | Film |
| 2011 | Source Code | ADR Loop Group | Film |
| 2011 | Dragons: Gift of the Night Fury | ADR Loop Group | Film |
| 2014 | Planes: Fire & Rescue | ADR Loop Group | Film |
| 2016 | The Angry Birds Movie | Loop Group | Film |
| 2017 | The Boss Baby | ADR Group | Film |
| 2018 | Smallfoot | Loop Group | Film |
| 2019 | The Lego Movie 2: The Second Part | Loop Group | Film |
| 2019 | Jexi | Loop Group | Film |
| 2020 | The Witches | Loop Group | Film |
| 2021 | The Tomorrow War | Looper | Film |
| 2021 | The Boss Baby: Family Business | ADR Group | Film |
| 2021 | Paranormal Activity: Next of Kin | ADR Voice Cast | Film |
| 2023 | The Hunger Games: The Ballad of Songbirds & Snakes | ADR Cast | Film |

=== Stage ===
- Peter Pan
- Sleeping Beauty
