= Donald Faison =

American actor and comedian (born 1974)

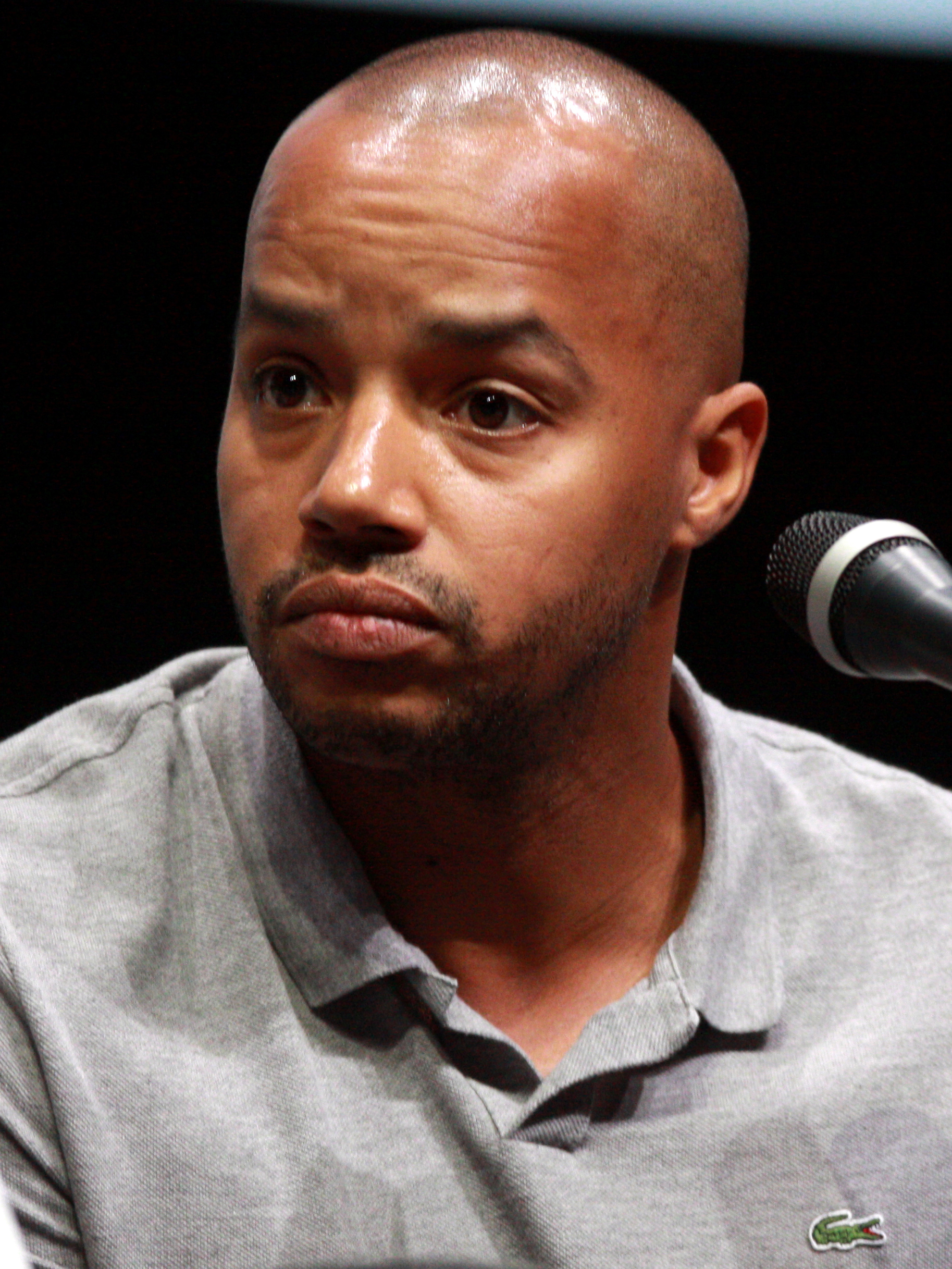
- Faison in 2013
- Born: Donald Adeosun Faison; June 22, 1974 (age 52); New York City, New York, US
- Occupations: Actor; comedian
- Years active: 1989–present
- Spouses: Lisa Askey (m. 2001; div. 2005); CaCee Cobb (m. 2012)
- Children: 6
- Relatives: Olamide Faison (brother); Julian Horton (cousin)

Donald Adeosun Faison (/ˈfeɪzɒn/; born June 22, 1974) is an American actor and comedian. He is known for his leading role as Dr. Chris Turk in the ABC/NBC comedy-drama Scrubs and its revival (2001–2010; 2026–) and a supporting role as Murray in both the film Clueless (1995) and the subsequent television series of the same name. He also starred as Phil Chase in the TV Land sitcom The Exes (2011–2015). Faison has also co-starred in the films Waiting to Exhale (1995), Remember the Titans (2000), Uptown Girls (2003), Something New (2006), Next Day Air (2009), Skyline (2010), and Kick-Ass 2 (2013).

== Early life, family and education ==
Donald Adeosun Faison was born on June 22, 1974, in Harlem, New York City, to talent agent Shirley and building manager Donald Faison. His parents were active with the National Black Theatre in Harlem. They divorced in 1992. He is the older brother of singer/musician Olamide Faison. Actor Julian Horton is their first cousin. Despite sharing a surname, Faison is not related to fellow actor Frankie Faison.

Faison attended the Professional Children's School in Manhattan, and actor Dash Mihok was his classmate and best friend.

== Career ==
Faison first appeared in a 1989 commercial for Folgers coffee at age 15, in which he played the younger brother of a soldier. In 1992, he appeared with Malik Yoba in the ABC News special Prejudice: Answering Children's Questions, hosted by Peter Jennings. He had a small role in the feature film Sugar Hill starring Wesley Snipes.

Faison's breakout role was Murray Duvall in the 1995 feature film Clueless and the subsequent television series, which ran from 1996 to 1999. In 1995, he also appeared in Waiting to Exhale as Tarik, the son of Loretta Devine's character, Gloria. He was featured in New Jersey Drive. He also starred in Big Fat Liar alongside Frankie Muniz, Paul Giamatti, and Amanda Bynes. He had a recurring role as Tracy on Felicity, appeared in Remember the Titans as the running back turned safety Petey Jones, and provided voice work for various characters in the MTV animated series Clone High. He had minor roles in the sitcoms Sister, Sister and Sabrina, the Teenage Witch, and in the film Josie and the Pussycats. In 2005, Faison produced one episode of MTV's Punk'd involving his Scrubs co-star Zach Braff. He appears in music videos for Brandy's "Sittin' Up in My Room," Fall Out Boy's cover of Michael Jackson's "Beat It," and Gavin Degraw's "Chariot."

In 2008, Faison voiced Gary the Stormtrooper in Robot Chicken: Star Wars Episode II. Afterwards, he interned on the Robot Chicken show to learn more about stop motion animation, and started a Star Wars-themed Lego stop-motion show, BlackStormTrooper, on his YouTube channel, shundigga.

On February 13, 2009, Faison participated in the NBA All-Star Weekend Celebrity Game. Other celebrities participating included NBA Hall of Famers Clyde Drexler and Dominique Wilkins, NFL wide receiver Terrell Owens, actor Chris Tucker, and four Harlem Globetrotters.

In 2010, Faison starred in the Brothers Strause science fiction thriller Skyline. Faison was in the 2010 CBS comedy pilot The Odds.

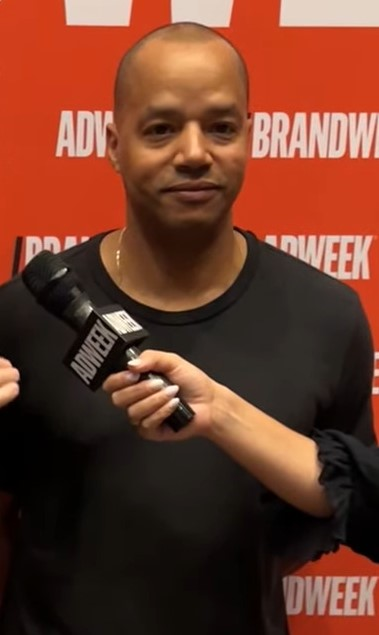
Faison in 2023

As of March 2011, Faison appeared in commercials for The Sims Medieval. In 2012, he made a cameo appearance in the movie Pitch Perfect. In 2013, Faison hosted the short-lived TBS comedy sketch show Who Gets the Last Laugh?. From 2016 to 2018, he hosted the Game Show Network game show Winsanity.

From 2018 until 2020, Faison voiced pilot Hype Fazon, a character written and named for him by Dave Filoni, in Star Wars Resistance. Faison had caught Filoni's attention via his stop motion Star Wars cartoons.

Faison and Scrubs co-star Zach Braff co-host the rewatch podcast Fake Doctors, Real Friends, which launched in March 2020, sharing their stories and experiences of shooting the show. The podcast is distributed by iHeartRadio.

Faison created the web series Alabama Jackson for Adult Swim's YouTube channel, which premiered in 2022. Faison stars as the title character.

== Personal life ==
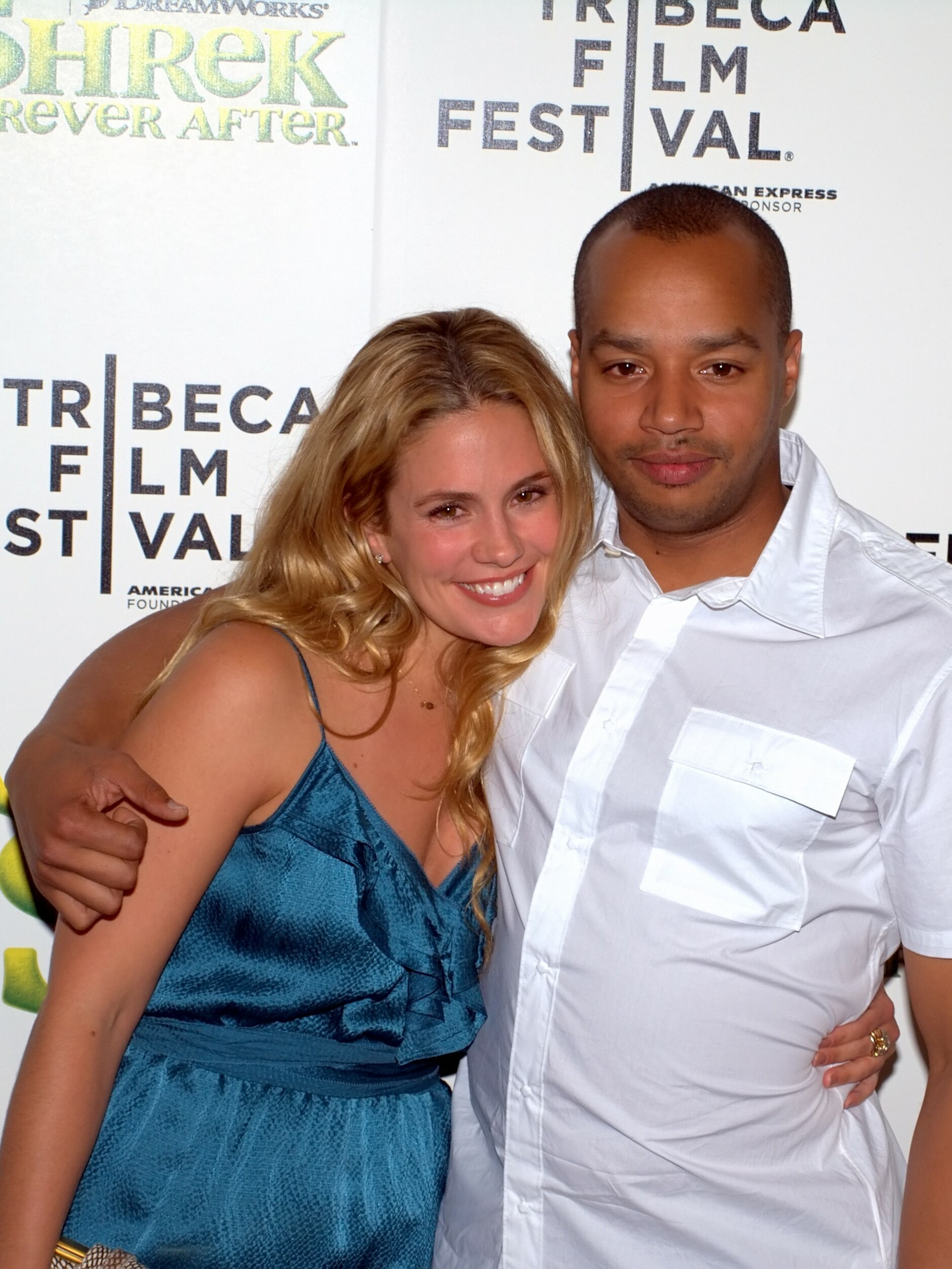
Faison with second wife CaCee Cobb at the 2010 Tribeca Film Festival

He had his first son, Sean Faison-Ince (born 1996), with ex-girlfriend Audrey Ince.

In 1997, Faison started dating Lisa Askey, a nursing student. They married in 2001 and had three children, twins Kaya and Dade (born 1999), and Kobe (born 2001). They divorced in 2005.

Faison married his second wife, CaCee Cobb, on December 15, 2012, after six years of dating. They have two children, Rocco (born 2013) and Wilder Francis (born 2015). The wedding was held at the home of Faison's best friend, and Scrubs co-star Zach Braff, who also served as a groomsman. Serving as a bridesmaid was singer Jessica Simpson, for whom Cobb formerly worked as a personal assistant.

When Askey, Faison's first wife, died in 2017, their children moved in with Faison and Cobb.

== Filmography ==
=== Film ===
Year	Title	Role	Notes
1992	Juice	Student	
1994	Sugar Hill	Kymie Daniels	
1995	New Jersey Drive	'Tiny Dime'	Credited as Donald Adeosun Faison
1995	Clueless	Murray Duvall	
1995	Waiting to Exhale	Tarik Matthews	Credited as Donald Adeosun Faison
1996	The Quest	Robber	Uncredited
1997	Academy Boyz	Glen Lewis	
1998	Butter	Khaleed	
1998	Can't Hardly Wait	Dan	
1999	Trippin'	June Nelson	
2000	Remember the Titans	Petey Jones	
2001	Double Whammy	Cletis	
2001	Josie and the Pussycats	D.J.	Uncredited
2002	Big Fat Liar	Frank Jackson	
2003	Ravedactyl: Project Evolution	Gunner	Short film
2003	Uptown Girls	Huey	
2003	Good Boy!	Wilson	Voice only
2005	King's Ransom	Andre	
2006	Something New	Nelson McQueen	
2006	Bachelor Party Vegas	Ash	
2006	Homie Spumoni	Renato Molina / Leroy	
2007	Venus & Vegas	Stu	
2009	Next Day Air	Leo	
2010	Skyline	Terry	
2012	Pitch Perfect	Older Acapella Man	
2013	Kick-Ass 2	Samuel Keers / Doctor Gravity	
2013	A Snow Globe Christmas	Ted	
2013	Stag	Ken	
2014	Wish I Was Here	Anthony	
2014	Let's Kill Ward's Wife	Ward	
2014	Wonderland	Ted	
2016	The Perfect Match	Rick	
2016	Hot Bot	Mr. Huffington	
2017	Little Evil	Larry	
2018	Game Over, Man!	Himself	
2019	The Wave	Jeff	
2020	Embattled	Mr. Dan Stewart	
2025	Home Delivery	Jimmy	
2026	Christmas at the Kringles	Daryl	

=== Television ===
Year	Title	Role	Notes
1992	Sesame Street	Duane	9 episodes
1996	New York Undercover	James	Episode: "Sympathy for the Devil"
1996–2000	Sabrina, the Teenage Witch	Justin	Episode: "Magic Joel"
1996–2000	Sabrina, the Teenage Witch	Dashiell Calzone	3 episodes
1996–1999	Clueless	Murray Duvall	Main role; 62 episides
1998	Sister, Sister	Darryl	Episode: "Greek to Me"
1999	Supreme Sanction	Marcus	Television film
2000–2002	Felicity	Tracy	23 episodes
2001–2010	Scrubs	Christopher Turk	Main role; 182 episodes
2002–2003; 2023–2024	Clone High	Toots / George Washington Carver / various	Voice only; 23 episodes
2004–2005	Higglytown Heroes	Firefighter Hero	Voice only; 2 episodes
2005–2022	Robot Chicken	Various voices	16 episodes
2006	The Playbook	Host	3 episodes
2007	Saturday Night Live	Christopher Turk	Episode: "Zach Braff/Maroon 5"
2007	Robot Chicken: Star Wars	Dr. Cornelius Evazan / Mace Windu	Voice only; television special
2007	Kim Possible	Ricky Rotiffle	Voice only; episode: "Homecoming Upset"
2008	The Boondocks	Catcher Freeman / Tobias / Wedgie Rudlin	Voice only; 3 episodes
2008	Robot Chicken: Star Wars Episode II	Gary / Darth Maul / Imperial Pilot	Voice only; television special
2009	Scrubs: Interns	Christopher Turk	Episode: "Our Meeting with Turk and Todd"
2009	American Dad!	Christopher Turk	Voice only; episode: "G-String Circus"
2009	Titan Maximum	Martian Fleet Commander	Episode: "Pilot"
2010	Fact Checkers Unit	Donald	9 episodes
2010	Cubed	Himself	Episode: "2.12"
2010	Robot Chicken: Star Wars Episode III	Gary	Voice only; television special
2010	The Odds	Tyler	Television film
2011	Love Bites	Ricky	2 episodes
2011–2015	The Exes	Phil Chase	64 episodes
2012	Tron: Uprising	Bartik	Voice only; 5 episodes
2012	Adventure Time	Princess Cookie	Voice only; episode: "Princess Cookie"
2013	Wedding Band	Moses	Episode: "99 Problems"
2013	Who Gets the Last Laugh?	Host	9 episodes
2013	A Snow Globe Christmas	Ted	Television film
2014	Hollywood Game Night	Himself	3 episodes
2014	Jim Henson's Creature Shop Challenge	Wizard	Episode: "Head's Up"
2015	Undateable	Donald	2 episodes
2015–2018	Supermansion	Quiplash	Voice only; 4 episodes
2015–2018	Drunk History	Joe Louis / Mansa Musa	2 episodes
2016–2018	Winsanity	Host	80 episodes
2016	House of Lies	Donald	2 episodes
2017	Bill Nye Saves the World	Himself	Episode: "Malarkey!"
2017–2019	Ryan Hansen Solves Crimes on Television	Himself	2 episodes
2017–2018	Ray Donovan	Antoine A'Shawn Anderson	7 episodes
2018	Unsolved: The Murders of Tupac and the Notorious B.I.G.	Jacques Agnant	2 episodes
2018–2020	Star Wars Resistance	Hype Fazon/TIE Pilot #1	Voice only; 18 episodes
2019	Timeline	Principal Anderson	Main role
2019–2020	Emergence	Alex Evans	Main role
2020	Star Wars: The Clone Wars	Tactical Droid	Voice only; episode: "Old Friends Not Forgotten"
2021	Infinity Train	Beehive	Voice only; episode: "The Party Car"
2021	Powerpuff	Prof. Drake Utonium	Unaired pilot
2021–2022	The L Word: Generation Q	Tom Maultsby	8 episodes
2022	Legends of Tomorrow	Booster Gold	Episode: "Knocked Down, Knocked Up"
2022	Reindeer in Here	Bucky	Voice only; Television special
2022	Alabama Jackson	Alabama Jackson	Main role; also creator, executive producer and writer
2022–2024	Alice's Wonderland Bakery	Harry the March Hare	Voice only
2023	The Boss Baby: Back in the Crib	Dr. Thubberirhd	Voice only; 3 episodes
2023	The Wonder Years	Terrence	Episode: "Blockbusting"
2023	HouseBroken	Illinois James / Microwave Cat	Voice only; 2 episodes
2023–2024	Extended Family	Trey	Lead role
2024	Solar Opposites	Alex	Voice only; episode: "The Educational Sprinkler Device"
2025	Moon Girl and Devil Dinosaur	Corey / Blobby	Voice only; episode: "Crushed"
2026–present	Scrubs	Christopher Turk	Main role

=== Web ===
Year	Title	Role	Notes
2026	Backyard Sports: The Animated Special	Dante Robinson (voice)	Animated special

=== Music videos ===
Year	Title	Artist
1995	"Sittin' Up in My Room"	Brandy
1996	"Kissin' You ("Oh, Honey" Remix)"	Total, Puff Daddy & Notorious B.I.G
1999	"No Doubt"	Imajin
1999	"Flava"	Imajin
1999	"Da Bomb"	DJ Fury and RX Lord
2003	"Chariot"	Gavin DeGraw
2008	"Beat It"	Fall Out Boy featuring John Mayer
2013	"More Champagne"	DJ Whoo Kid featuring A$AP Ferg, Problem and Wiz Khalifa
2015	"Time Machine"	Ingrid Michaelson

=== Video games ===
A dance that Faison performs during an episode of Scrubs is featured in the video game Fortnite. Faison's permission was not sought before including the dance, and he did not receive royalties for it.

== Awards and nominations ==
Year	Award	Category	Nominated work	Result
2002	6th OFTA Television Awards	Best Actor in a New Comedy Series	Scrubs	Nominated
2004	6th Teen Choice Awards	Choice TV: Sidekick	Scrubs	Nominated
2004	1st BET Comedy Awards	Outstanding Supporting Actor in a Comedy Series	Scrubs	Won
2005	36th NAACP Image Awards	Outstanding Supporting Actor in a Comedy Series	Scrubs	Nominated
2005	7th Teen Choice Awards	Choice TV: Sidekick	Scrubs	Nominated
2005	9th Prism Awards	Performance in a Comedy Series	Scrubs	Nominated
2005	2nd BET Comedy Awards	Outstanding Supporting Actor in a Comedy Series	Scrubs	Won
2006	37th NAACP Image Awards	Outstanding Actor in a Comedy Series	Scrubs	Nominated
2006	8th Teen Choice Awards	Choice TV: Sidekick	Scrubs	Nominated
2007	38th NAACP Image Awards	Outstanding Actor in a Comedy Series	Scrubs	Nominated
2007	9th Teen Choice Awards	Choice TV: Sidekick	Scrubs	Nominated
2008	39th NAACP Image Awards	Outstanding Actor in a Comedy Series	Scrubs	Nominated
2009	40th NAACP Image Awards	Outstanding Actor in a Comedy Series	Scrubs	Nominated
2010	41st NAACP Image Awards	Outstanding Actor in a Comedy Series	Scrubs	Nominated
2013	44th NAACP Image Awards	Outstanding Actor in a Comedy Series	The Exes	Nominated
2013	6th L.A. Comedy Film Festival and Screenplay Competition Awards	Best Actor in a Feature Film	Stag	Nominated

== See also ==
- List of people from Harlem
