= Wayne Knight =

American actor (born 1955)

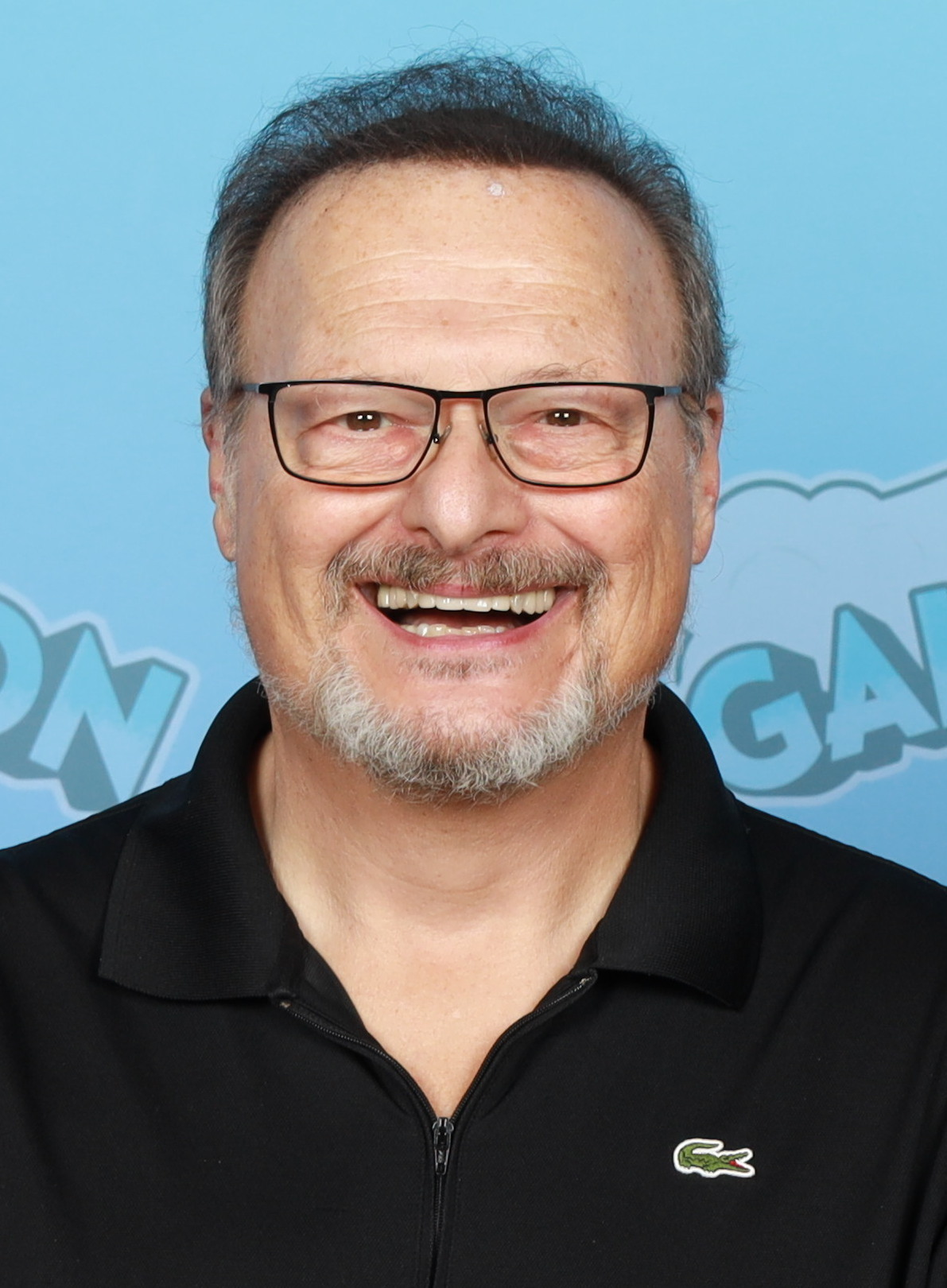
- Knight at the 2025 GalaxyCon Raleigh
- Born: Wayne Elliot Knight; August 7, 1955 (age 71); New York City, U.S.
- Education: University of Georgia
- Occupation: Actor
- Years active: 1977–present
- Spouses: Paula Sutor (m. 1996; div. 2003) Clare de Chenu (m. 2006)
- Children: 1

Wayne Elliot Knight (born August 7, 1955) is an American actor. After several smaller film parts, including in box office successes like Dirty Dancing and Basic Instinct, Knight's breakthrough role was portraying Dennis Nedry in the film adaptation of Jurassic Park (1993), which earned him a Saturn Award for Best Supporting Actor nomination. His other two most prominent roles followed on television, where he played Newman on the NBC sitcom Seinfeld (1992–1998) and Officer Don Orville on the NBC sitcom 3rd Rock from the Sun (1996–2001), which earned him a Q Award nomination for Best Recurring Player and a Screen Actors Guild Award nomination for Outstanding Performance by an Ensemble in a Comedy Series, respectively.

Knight would go on to appear in films such as Space Jam (1996), For Richer or Poorer (1997), Rat Race (2001), Punisher: War Zone (2008), and Five Nights at Freddy's 2 (2025). He has also worked extensively as a voice actor, playing the roles of Tantor in Tarzan (1999), Al McWhiggin in Toy Story 2 (1999), and Frank in Goat (2026). Knight has also voiced Igor in Toonsylvania (1998–1999), Dojo Kanojo Cho in Xiaolin Showdown (2003–2006), Mr. Blik in Catscratch (2005–2007), Baron Von Sheldgoose in Legend of the Three Caballeros (2018), and Lime in Among Us (2026).

== Early life ==
Wayne Elliot Knight was born on August 7, 1955, in New York City to Grace (née Monti) and William Knight. He was raised Catholic. The family moved to Cartersville, Georgia, where his father worked in the textile industry. Knight attended local schools and was a lineman on his high school's football team.

Knight attended the University of Georgia before beginning his acting career and later returned to complete his degree in 2008.

== Career ==
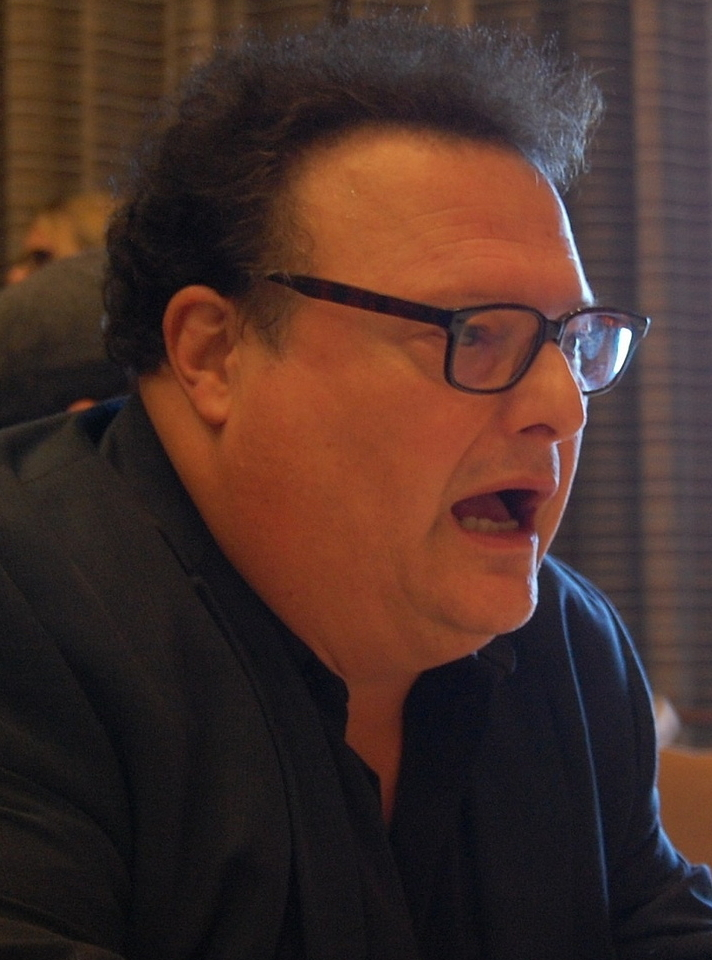
Knight at the 2013 San Diego Comic-Con

=== Early career ===
Knight received an internship at the Barter Theatre in Abingdon, Virginia, which produced repertory works. After completing his internship, he joined the company and gained standing as an Equity actor. Knight subsequently moved back to his birthplace, New York City. After two years, he landed his first role on Broadway. After his time on Broadway, he also worked as a private investigator for five years.

=== Film work ===
Knight appeared in various films in the late 1980s and early 1990s, including Dirty Dancing (1987), Born on the Fourth of July (1989), Dead Again (1991), JFK (1991) and Basic Instinct (1992). He was the first actor cast in Jurassic Park (1993) after director Steven Spielberg saw his performance in Basic Instinct. Knight was cast as InGen Corporation's chief programmer for the park and secret spy for Biosyn, Dennis Nedry. He also appeared in To Die For (1995), Space Jam (1996), For Richer or Poorer (1997), and Rat Race (2001). He played the Punisher's techno sidekick Microchip in Punisher: War Zone (2008). In April 2012, Knight was featured in the romantic comedy, She Wants Me.

=== Television work ===
In the 1990s, Knight played supporting roles on two television series on NBC. He played the mailman Newman, Jerry's neighbor and nemesis, in Seinfeld, and Officer Don Orville, Sally's love interest, in 3rd Rock from the Sun. He had earlier appeared in Against the Grain. He also appeared as a regular on two sketch comedy series, The Edge for Fox and Assaulted Nuts for Cinemax and Channel 4 in the United Kingdom.

Knight appeared on the pilot episode of the American version of Thank God You're Here. He made a second appearance, on the last episode of the first season of the television series. He won the Thank God You're Here blue door award.

In November 2009, Knight reprised his role as the Seinfeld character Newman, for the seventh season of Curb Your Enthusiasm. He also guest starred on CSI: Crime Scene Investigation Season 10 in the episode "Working Stiffs".

Knight guest starred on a 2010 episode of Fox's drama series Bones, in the first season of the TV Land comedy series Hot in Cleveland (2010), where he became a recurring character for season two, and on an episode of The Whole Truth in the fall of 2010. He played an Internet-fixated couch potato in the TV Land sitcom, The Exes. In the summer of 2011, he appeared in the BBC/Starz series Torchwood: Miracle Day as Brian Friedkin.

In February 2014, Knight reprised the character Newman, during one commercial during the Super Bowl, alongside Jerry Seinfeld and Jason Alexander. In December 2017, Knight was featured in an advertisement for KFC depicting Colonel Sanders.

=== Voice work ===
Knight has done voice acting work for numerous animations, including the black cat Mr. Blik in Catscratch, Igor in Toonsylvania, the dragon Dojo Kanojo Cho in the Kids' WB! animated series Xiaolin Showdown, Emperor Zurg on Buzz Lightyear of Star Command on Toon Disney and Disney Channel; Demetrius the shopkeeper in Hercules (1997); Al McWhiggin, the toy store manager of Al's Toy Barn in Toy Story 2 (1999); Tantor the elephant in Tarzan (1999), and the bug Juju on Tak and the Power of Juju (2003). He made guest appearances on Billy & Mandy's Jacked-Up Halloween as Jack O'Lantern, Dilbert as the Security Guard, and Brandy & Mr. Whiskers as Mr. Cantarious the snail. Knight guest starred in The Penguins of Madagascar as Max the Cat, in the episodes "Launchtime" and "Cat's Cradle". He voiced The Elf Elder in Tom and Jerry: The Lost Dragon (2014).

=== Theatre work ===
Knight also appeared on Broadway in productions of Gemini, Mastergate, 'Art' and Sweet Charity with Christina Applegate. Knight appeared as Santa in Elf: The Musical in November 2012. He previously appeared on Broadway in Art in 1999.

== Personal life ==
Knight married makeup artist Paula Sutor on May 26, 1996, in a ceremony held in the home of fellow Seinfeld cast member Michael Richards. They had divorced by December 2003. He married his second wife, Clare de Chenu, on October 15, 2006; together they have a son, Liam. The family lives in Toluca Lake, Los Angeles, an area where Knight has resided for many years.

Knight attended the 2012 Democratic National Convention. Ahead of the 2020 United States presidential election, Knight appeared in an advertisement that examined "ethical breaches" of mail workers in the U.S. and the lack of support they received from the government. The advertisement was in support of the Democratic Party and anti-Donald Trump.

== Filmography ==
=== Film ===
Year	Title	Role	Notes
1979	The Wanderers	Waiter	Uncredited
1987	Dirty Dancing	Stan	
1988	Everybody's All-American	Fraternity Pisser	
1989	Born on the Fourth of July	Official #2 – Democratic Convention	
1991	V.I. Warshawski	Earl 'Bonehead' Smeissen	
1991	Dead Again	Pete 'Piccolo' Dugan	
1991	JFK	Numa Bertel	
1992	Basic Instinct	John Correli	
1993	Jurassic Park	Dennis Nedry	Nominated—Saturn Award for Best Supporting Actor
1995	To Die For	Ed Grant	
1995	Chameleon	Stuart Langston	
1996	Space Jam	Stan Podolak	
1997	Hercules	Demetrius	Voice
1997	For Richer or Poorer	Bob Lachmen	
1998	The Brave Little Toaster Goes to Mars	Microwave	Voice, direct-to-video
1998	Soundman	Tim	Voice
1999	My Favorite Martian	Zoot The Suit	Voice, Uncredited
1999	Pros & Cons	Wayne	
1999	Tarzan	Tantor	Voice
1999	Toy Story 2	Al McWhiggin	Voice
2000	Buzz Lightyear of Star Command: The Adventure Begins	Evil Emperor Zurg	Voice, direct-to-video
2001	Rat Race	Zach Mallozzi	
2003	Cheaper by the Dozen	Electrician	Uncredited cameo
2004	Black Cloud	Mr. Tipping	
2005	Dinotopia: Quest for the Ruby Sunstone	Thudd	Voice, direct-to-video
2007	Forfeit	Bob	
2008	Kung Fu Panda	Gang Boss	Voice
2008	Scooby-Doo! and the Goblin King	The Amazing Krudsky	Voice, direct-to-video
2008	Punisher: War Zone	Linus Lieberman / Microchip	
2012	She Wants Me	Walter Baum	
2012	Excuse Me for Living	Albert	
2014	Tom and Jerry: The Lost Dragon	Elf Elder	Voice, direct-to-video
2016	Kung Fu Panda 3	Big Fun, Hom-Lee	Voice
2016	Hail, Caesar!	Lurking Extra #1	
2018	Blindspotting	Patrick	
2020	The Very Excellent Mr. Dundee	Wayne	
2021	12 Mighty Orphans	Frank Wynn	
2021	Back to the Outback	Phil	Voice
2022	Darby and the Dead	Mel	
2023	Urkel Saves Santa: The Movie	Mr. Hodges	Voice; direct-to-video
2024	The Day the Earth Blew Up: A Looney Tunes Movie	Mayor	Voice
2025	Five Nights at Freddy's 2	Mr. Berg	
2026	Goat	Frank	Voice
2026	Hexed †	TBA	Voice

=== Television ===
Year	Title	Role	Notes
1982	For Lovers Only	Video Game Fanatic	TV film Uncredited
1983	The Day After	Man In Hospital	TV film
1985	Assaulted Nuts	Various	Main role (seven episodes)
1988	Tattingers	Kenny Axelrod	2 episodes
1990	Mathnet	Peter Pickwick	Episode: "The Case of the Parking Meter Massacre"
1990	Square One TV	Peter Pickwick	3 episodes
1992–1998	Seinfeld	Newman	Recurring role Nominated—Q Award for Best Recurring Player (1998)
1992	Double Edge	Tommy White	TV film
1992–1993	The Edge	Various Characters	Main role
1992	T Bone N Weasel	Roy Kramp	TV film
1993	Fallen Angels	Leo Cunningham	Episode: "Dead End Delia"
1993	Against the Grain	'Froggy' Wilson	Episode: "Pilot"
1993–1994	The Second Half	Robert Piccolo	Main role
1994	Golden Gate	Arthur Genopopoulos	TV film
1996–2001	3rd Rock from the Sun	Don Orville	Main role Nominated—Screen Actors Guild Award for Outstanding Performance by an Ensemble in a Comedy Series (1998–1999)
1997	Contempt of Court	Merill Bushman	TV film
1998	Hercules	Orthos (ponytail head)	Voice, 2 episodes
1998	Toonsylvania	Igor	Voice, main role
2000	Dilbert	Security Guard	Voice, episode: "The Security Guard"
2000–2001	Buzz Lightyear of Star Command	Zurg	Voice, main role
2001	That '70s Show	The Angel	Episode: "It's a Wonderful Life"
2001	Bleacher Bums	Zig	TV film
2002	Becker	Wally	Episode: "Picture Imperfect"
2002	Master Spy: The Robert Hanssen Story	Walter Ballou	TV film
2003	The Twilight Zone	Nick Dark	Episode: "How Much Do You Love Your Kid?"
2003–2006	Xiaolin Showdown	Dojo Kanojo Cho	Voice, main cast
2003	Gary the Rat	Gary's Rival	Voice, episode: "The Reunion"
2003	The Grim Adventures of Billy & Mandy	Jack O'Lantern	Voice, episode: "Billy & Mandy's Jacked-Up Halloween"
2004	I'm with Her	Kevin	Episode: "Friends in Low Places"
2004	The Drew Carey Show	Owen	Episode: "Liar Liar House on Fire"
2004	Listen Up	Buddy	Episode: "Sweet Charity"
2005–2007	Catscratch	Mr. Blik, additional voices	Voice, main cast
2005	Justice League Unlimited	Abnegazar	Voice, episode: "The Balance"
2006	CSI: NY	Truman Bosch	Episode: "Fare Game"
2006	Brandy & Mr. Whiskers	Mr. Cantarious	Voice, episode: "You've Got Snail"
2006	How I Met Your Mother	Lily's Landlord	Voice, uncredited, Episode: "How Lily Stole Christmas"
2007	Tak and the Power of Juju	Bug Juju	Voice, episode: "Our Favorite Juju"
2009–2012	The Penguins of Madagascar	Max The Cat	Voice, 3 episodes
2009	WordGirl	Police Commissioner Watson	Voice, episode: "The Wrong Side of the Law"
2009	Woke Up Dead	Andrew Batten	Main role
2009	CSI: Crime Scene Investigation	Mr. Terrence Lombard	Episode: "Working Stiffs"
2009	Nip/Tuck	Don Hoberman	Episode: "Don Hoberman"
2009–2011	The Super Hero Squad Show	Elihas Starr / Egghead	Voice, 3 episodes
2009	Curb Your Enthusiasm	Himself	Uncredited; Episode: "The Table Read"
2010–2011	Hot in Cleveland	Rick	Recurring role
2010	The Good Guys	Perry Black	Episode: "Little Things"
2010	The Whole Truth	Judge Mark Hulverson	Episode: "Uncanny"
2010	Bones	Jimmy Walpert III	Episode: "The Babe in the Bar"
2011	Torchwood	Brian Friedkin	3 episodes
2011–2012	Kung Fu Panda: Legends of Awesomeness	Jong / Jong's Son	Voice, 2 episodes
2011–2015	The Exes	Haskell Lutz	Main role
2012	Green Lantern: The Animated Series	Captain Goray	Voice, episode: "Into the Abyss"
2012	Pound Puppies	Ralphie / Construction Worker #1	Voice, episode: "Good Dog, McLeish!"
2013	Regular Show	Guardian of The Friend Zone, God of Street Performing	Voice, 2 episodes
2014	Comedians in Cars Getting Coffee	Newman	Episode: "The Over-Cheer"
2014	Unforgettable	Dr. Theodore Blumer	Episode: "East of Islip"
2015	Sirens	Richard	Episode: "Sub-Primal Fears"
2015	TripTank	Greg / Customer	Voice, 2 episodes
2015	Doc McStuffins	Viewy Stewie	Voice, episode: "Fully Focused"
2016	Home: Adventures with Tip & Oh	Boovius	Voice, episode: "The Gray Matter"
2016	StartUp	Benny Blush	3 episodes
2017	Still the King	Dan	Episode: "Still Still the King"
2017	Narcos	Alan Starkman	2 episodes
2017	The Young and the Restless	Irv	2 episodes
2017	Stretch Armstrong and the Flex Fighters	Brick	Voice, 2 episodes
2018	Law & Order: Special Victims Unit	Grigor	Episode: "Service"
2018	Legend of the Three Caballeros	Baron Von Sheldgoose / Shieldgoose Ancestors	Voice, main role
2018	The Truth About the Harry Quebert Affair	Benjamin Roth	Main role
2019–2020	Harley Quinn	Oswald Cobblepot / Penguin	Voice, 2 episodes
2019	Robot Chicken	Nutsy Goldberg	Voice, episode: "Robot Chicken's Santa's Dead (Spoiler Alert) Holiday Murder Thing Special"
2020	Infinity Train	Marcel	Voice, episode: "The Map Car"
2021	Amphibia	Ned	Voice, episode: "Thai Feud"
2023	Monster High	Ralph	Voice, episode: "Furmergency" and "Moonlit Fieldtrip"
2023–2025	Bookie	Cowboy	3 episodes
2024	Batwheels	King Tut	Episode: "Bat-Blast-Off!"
2024	Them	Lieutenant Schiff	5 episodes
2024	That 90's Show	Bruce	Episode: "Baby-Baby-Baby"
2025	9-1-1: Lone Star	Milton	Episode: "Impact"
2026	St. Denis Medical	Dr. Felix Axler	Episode: "Nod and Agree"
2026	Among Us	Lime	Voice

=== Video games ===
Year	Title	Role	Notes
1999	Toy Story 2	Al McWhiggin	Voice
2007	Catscratch	Mr. Blik	Voice
2007	Nicktoons: Attack of the Toybots	Mr. Blik	Voice, (Nintendo DS version only)
2011	Jurassic Park: The Game	Dennis Nedry	Voice, Uncredited
2011	The Penguins of Madagascar: Dr. Blowhole Returns – Again!	Max	Voice
2019	Jurassic Park (Pinball)	Dennis Nedry	Voice

== Theatre ==
Year	Title	Role	Notes
1977–1981	Gemini	Herschel Weinberger	Broadway
1989	Mastergate	Steward Butler, Senator Knight, Representative Byers	Broadway
1999	Art	Yvan	Broadway
2005	Sweet Charity	Herman	Broadway
2006	Measure for Pleasure	Sir Peter Lustforth	
2007	The Front Page	Sheriff Hartman	
2008	The Odd Couple	Murray	
2012–2013	Elf	Santa Claus	Broadway

== Awards and nominations ==
Awards and nominations
Year	Award	Category	Title	Result
1994	Saturn Award	Best Supporting Actor	Jurassic Park	Nominated
1998	OFTA Television Award	Best Guest Actor in a Comedy Series	Seinfeld	Nominated
1998	Q Awards	Best Recurring Player	Seinfeld	Nominated
1998	Screen Actors Guild Awards	Outstanding Performance by an Ensemble in a Comedy Series	3rd Rock from the Sun	Nominated
1999	Screen Actors Guild Awards	Outstanding Performance by an Ensemble in a Comedy Series	3rd Rock from the Sun	Nominated
1999	Stinker Award	Most Botched Comic Relief	My Favorite Martian	Nominated
