= Kristen Johnston =

American actress (b. 1967)

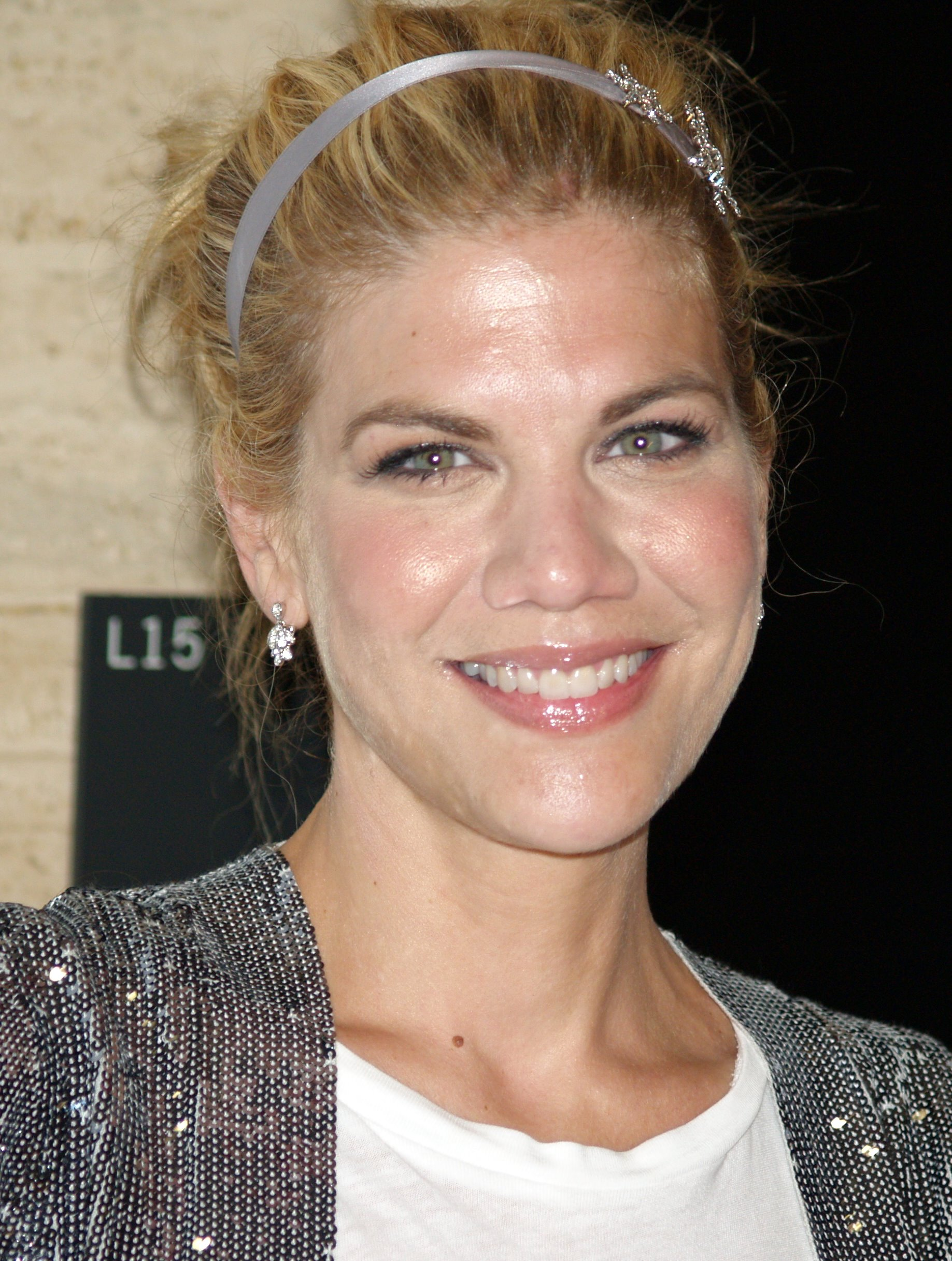
- Johnston in 2008
- Born: Kristen Angela Johnston; September 20, 1967 (age 59); Washington, D.C., U.S.
- Education: New York University (BFA)
- Occupation: Actress
- Years active: 1985–present
- Height: 6 ft 0 in (1.83 m)

Kristen Angela Johnston (born September 20, 1967) is an American actress. Best known for her work on television sitcoms, she twice won the Primetime Emmy Award for Outstanding Supporting Actress in a Comedy Series for her role as Sally Solomon in 3rd Rock from the Sun.

She starred as divorce attorney Holly Franklin on The Exes, and as recovering addict Tammy Diffendorf on Mom. She has also appeared in the films Austin Powers: The Spy Who Shagged Me (1999), The Flintstones in Viva Rock Vegas (2000), Music and Lyrics (2007), and Bride Wars (2009).

Her memoir Guts: The Endless Follies and Tiny Triumphs of a Giant Disaster (2012) was a New York Times best-seller.

== Early life ==
Kristen Angela Johnston was born on September 20, 1967. Johnston is the daughter of former Wisconsin Republican state senator Rod Johnston. She is of English and German descent. She grew up in a suburb of Milwaukee, Wisconsin, and graduated from Whitefish Bay High School in 1985. Johnston earned a Bachelor of Fine Arts degree in drama at New York University.

== Career ==
Johnston made her professional stage debut with New York's Atlantic Theater Company, founded by playwright David Mamet, where she appeared in many productions including As You Like It and Stage Door. She performed with the Naked Angels Theater Company in The Stand-In and Hot Keys, and with New York Stage and Film in Kim's Sister with David Strathairn and Jane Adams. For her performance in The Lights at Lincoln Center Theater, she was nominated for a Drama Desk Award for Best Supporting Actress.

A Carsey-Werner casting agent who saw her in The Lights recommended her for the role of Sally Solomon on the TV series 3rd Rock from the Sun. After numerous auditions in 1996, she won the part, and starred on the show from 1996 to 2001, winning two Emmy Awards for Outstanding Supporting Actress in a Comedy Series.

She made her feature film debut in The Debt, winner of Best Short at the 1993 Cannes Film Festival. In 1995, she played Kate in the film Backfire! She played Esmeralda, a sea hag in Thrill Ride, a family friendly film released in 2016. Her other television credits include guest-starring roles on Chicago Hope, Hearts Afire, and The 5 Mrs. Buchanans. She narrated Microscopic Milton on the Disney Channel. Her significant roles in commercially successful movies include Austin Powers: The Spy Who Shagged Me in 1999, The Flintstones in Viva Rock Vegas in 2000, Music and Lyrics in 2007, and Bride Wars in 2009. In 1998, she was a spokesmodel for the Clairol company.

Johnston appeared in the sixth and final season of HBO's comedy drama series Sex and the City. In the "Splat!" episode, her character, Lexi Featherston, an aging party girl, accidentally falls out of a window and dies (after saying, "I'm so bored I could die"), prompting Carrie Bradshaw (played by Sarah Jessica Parker) to reexamine her life. In 2005, Johnston was featured in six episodes of NBC's ER. In 2009, she was cast as Patsy in a proposed American remake of the British TV series Absolutely Fabulous. A pilot was filmed but it wasn't picked up to series. She had a recurring role in the 2009 season of Ugly Betty, and had a single-episode appearance as a dominatrix in the second season opener of Bored to Death.

She starred in the TV Land sitcom The Exes, which ran for four seasons from November 30, 2011, to September 16, 2015. She played divorce attorney Holly Franklin, whose former clients and friends live across the hall in an apartment she owns. Her memoir, titled Guts: The Endless Follies and Tiny Triumphs of a Giant Disaster was published on March 12, 2012 by Gallery Books. The book became a New York Times best-seller.

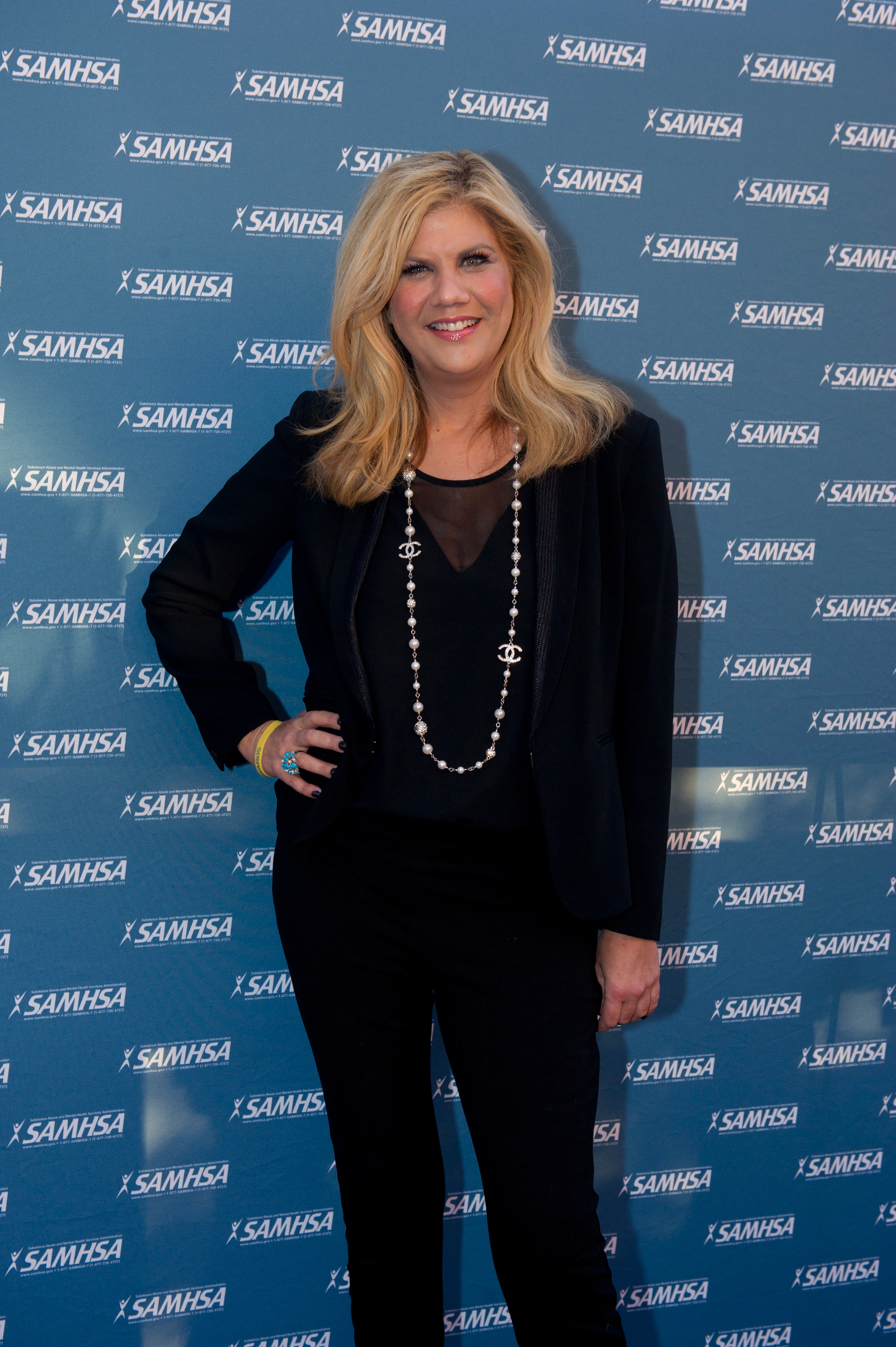
SAMHSA Special Recognition Award winner Johnston poses for a photo during the 2014 Voice Awards held on August 13 at Royce Hall on the campus of UCLA.

In 2018, she began a recurring role as Tammy Diffendorf on the CBS sitcom Mom, and was upgraded to series regular for the show's seventh and eighth seasons (2019–2020). Her character Tammy is Bonnie's (portrayed by Allison Janney) foster sister and Tammy joins the group's AA meetings upon being released from prison in season 6. In an interview with The New York Post, Johnston described Tammy by saying: "She’s probably the dumbest smart person you’ll ever meet. She’s so many things at once. She’s a criminal, but she’s also innocent. She’s clumsy but also very sophisticated. She has no editing button and just says whatever she feels — and it’s usually the wrong thing."

In May 2024, Variety announced that Johnston was cast in Netflix's comedy series Leanne alongside Leanne Morgan. The series was created by Morgan, Susan McMartin and Chuck Lorre. Johnston plays Carol, who is twice divorced and is loyal to her sister, Leanne.

== Public image ==
She appeared on the cover of January 1998 issue of Milwaukee Magazine. She topped the magazine's list of "The Most Intriguing Milwaukeeans". Johnston has also appeared on the cover of Entertainment Weekly and TV Guide. In 1998, she appeared in a television commercial for Clairol hair care products and voiced a commercial for Starbucks.

== Personal life ==
She dated actor Ryan Reynolds in 1999 and the two attended the film premiere of The Green Mile together.

In her memoir, Johnston discusses an addiction to alcohol and pills that began when she was in high school. She wrote that at the height of her addiction, she drank on average two bottles of wine per evening. In 2021, Johnston said she has been sober for 14 years.

Johnston said she was diagnosed with lupus myelitis in November 2013, which caused her to miss filming some episodes of her series The Exes and became extremely debilitating. She got her diagnosis and treatment after seventeen doctors and is currently in remission after chemotherapy, steroids, and IVIG.

== Filmography ==
=== Film ===
Year	Title	Role	Notes
1985	The Orkly Kid	Unknown	Short film
1992	Amazonia	Unknown	Short film
1993	The Debt	Alice Kosnick	Short film
1995	Backfire!	Kate	
1999	Austin Powers: The Spy Who Shagged Me	Ivana Humpalot	
2000	The Flintstones in Viva Rock Vegas	Wilma Slaghoople	
2002	Austin Powers in Goldmember	Dancer	Uncredited
2002	Ice Age	Sylvia Sloth	Voice role; scenes deleted
2005	Strangers with Candy	Coach Divers	
2007	Music and Lyrics	Rhonda	
2009	Bride Wars	Deb	
2009	Finding Bliss	Irene Fox	
2011	Life Happens	Francesca	
2012	Vamps	Mrs. Van Helsing	
2012	Bad Parents	Tracy	
2013	The Anonymous People	Herself	Documentary film
2014	Lovesick	Katherine	
2016	Thrill Ride	Esmeralda	Nominated–North Hollywood Cinefest's Festival Award for Best Actress in a Feature Film
2018	Swiped	Professor Barnes	
2018	For the Love of George	Psychic Sara	Nominated–Orlando Film Festival Award for Best Supporting Performance
2018	Hurricane Bianca 2: From Russia with Hate	Roksana	
2019	The Wedding Year	Barbara	
2020	Small Town Wisconsin	Alicia	
2023	Loganberry Lane	Other Susan	Short film Indie Short Fest's December Award for Best Ensemble Cast (shared with cast); Nominated–Indie Short Fest's Indie Short Fest Award for Best Ensemble Cast (shared with cast)
2025	Maddie's Secret	Beverlee Ralph	

=== Television ===
Year	Title	Role	Notes
1994	Chicago Hope	Dr. Wendy Smythe	Episode: "Genevieve and Fat Boy"
1994	The 5 Mrs. Buchanans	Zena	Episode: "Bad News Bert: There's Peanuts in the Peanut Butter"
1995	Hearts Afire	Margot	Episode: "John and Georgie's Not-So-Excellent Adventure"
1996	London Suite	Grace Chapman	Television film
1996–2001	3rd Rock from the Sun	Sally Solomon	139 episodes Primetime Emmy Award for Outstanding Supporting Actress in a Comedy Series (1997, 1999); Nominated—Primetime Emmy Award for Outstanding Supporting Actress in a Comedy Series (1998); Nominated—Golden Globe Award for Best Supporting Actress – Series, Miniseries, or TV Film (1997); Nominated—Screen Actors Guild Award for Outstanding Performance by a Female Actor in a Comedy Series (1997); Nominated—Screen Actors Guild Award for Outstanding Performance by an Ensemble in a Comedy Series (1997—1999)
1997	Microscopic Milton	Narrator	US version
1998–2000	Hollywood Squares	Herself	Panelist; 10 episodes
2004	Sex and the City	Lexi Featherston	Episode: "Splat!"
2005	ER	Head Nurse Eve Peyton	6 episodes
2007	Kim Possible	Warmonga (voice)	3 episodes
2009	The New Adventures of Old Christine	Francie	Episode: "Too Close for Christine"
2009	Ab Fab	Patsy	US remake of Absolutely Fabulous. Pilot episode only. Series not picked up.
2009–2010	Ugly Betty	Helen	3 episodes
2010	Bored to Death	Mistress Florence	Episode: "Escape from the Dungeon!"
2011–2015	The Exes	Holly Franklin	Gracie Award for Outstanding Female Actor in a Leading Role in a Comedy or Musical; Main role; 64 episodes
2013	RuPaul's Drag Race	Herself	2 episodes
2014	Kirstie	Waitress Maddie	Episode: "Maddie vs. Maddie"
2014	Modern Family	Brenda	Episode: "Strangers in the Night"
2015	Getting On	Marla Pounder	Episode: "Please Partake of a Memorial Orange"
2017	Daytime Divas	Anna Crouse	6 episodes
2018–2021	Mom	Tammy Diffendorf	57 episodes Guest: Season 5; Recurring: Season 6; Main: Seasons 7–8
2019	Amphibia	Braddock (voice)	Episode: "Prison Break"; replaced by April Winchell afterwards
2022	Our Flag Means Death	The Widow Evelyn Higgins	2 episodes
2023	The Righteous Gemstones	May–May Montgomery	9 episodes
2025	Leanne	Carol	Main role, 16 episodes
2026	Going Dutch	General Martin	Season 2 recurring role

=== Podcasts ===
Year	Title	Role	Notes
2021	The Pack Project	Veronica	Voice; Episode: "Elevator Bride"
2022	Marvel's Wastelanders: Doom	She-Hulk	10 episodes
2022	Naughty	Pam	5 episodes

== Stage ==
Year	Title	Role	Notes
1993	The Lights	Rose	Nominated—Drama Desk Award for Outstanding Featured Actress in a Play
1997	Baby Anger	Mary Kay Paterson	
1998	The Skin of Our Teeth	Sabina	
2001	The Smell of the Kill	Nicky	
2001–2002	The Women	Sylvia	
2002	Twelfth Night	Maria	
2004	Aunt Dan and Lemon	Aunt Dan	
2004	The Baltimore Waltz	Anna	
2004	Much Ado About Nothing	Beatrice	
2004	The Skin of Our Teeth	Sabina	
2007	Scarcity	Martha	
2006–2007	Love Song	Joan	
2007–2009	So Help Me God	Lily Darnley	Nominated—Drama Desk Award for Outstanding Actress in a Play (2007, 2010)
2008	The Understudy	Theresea Rebeck	

== Awards and nominations ==
Year	Award	Category	Work	Result	Ref.
1994	Drama Desk Award	Outstanding Featured Actress in a Play	The Lights	Nominated	
1996	Golden Globe Award	Best Supporting Actress – Series, Miniseries or Television Film	3rd Rock from the Sun	Nominated	
1996	Screen Actors Guild Award	Outstanding Performance by a Female Actor in a Comedy Series	3rd Rock from the Sun	Nominated	
1996	Screen Actors Guild Award	Outstanding Performance by an Ensemble in a Comedy Series	3rd Rock from the Sun	Nominated	
1997	Primetime Emmy Award	Outstanding Supporting Actress in a Comedy Series	3rd Rock from the Sun	Won	
1997	Screen Actors Guild Award	Outstanding Performance by an Ensemble in a Comedy Series	3rd Rock from the Sun	Nominated	
1998	Primetime Emmy Award	Outstanding Supporting Actress in a Comedy Series	3rd Rock from the Sun	Nominated	
1998	Screen Actors Guild Award	Outstanding Performance by an Ensemble in a Comedy Series	3rd Rock from the Sun	Nominated	
1999	Primetime Emmy Award	Outstanding Supporting Actress in a Comedy Series	3rd Rock from the Sun	Won	
2010	Drama Desk Award	Outstanding Actress in a Play	So Help Me God!	Nominated	

== Autobiography ==
- 2012: Guts: The Endless Follies and Tiny Triumphs of a Giant Disaster, Gallery Books, ISBN 978-1451635065
