= Without Evidence =

1995 film by Gill Dennis

- Directed by: Gill Dennis
- Written by: Gill Dennis; Phil Stanford
- Produced by: Eric R. Epperson
- Starring: Scott Plank; Anna Gunn; Angelina Jolie; Paul Perri; Andrew Prine
- Cinematography: Victor Nuñez
- Edited by: Renate D. Forster
- Music by: Franco Piersanti
- Release date: September 12, 2000
- Running time: 99 minutes
- Country: United States
- Language: English

Without Evidence is a 1995 thriller film directed and co-written by Gill Dennis in his first and last film he directed. It stars Scott Plank, Anna Gunn, Angelina Jolie, Paul Perri, and Andrew Prine. It was co-written by Dennis and Phil Stanford.

== Plot ==
Without Evidence is based on the true story of Michael Francke, who was the Head of Corrections for the state of Oregon before being murdered. Just before his murder, Francke visits his brother and informs him he's been "stepping on some toes, found some things and got to clean house." involving his prison colleagues. When Michael is killed, his brother begins his own investigation into the murder, leading him to more lies and deceit. The "things" that Franke found could have been what an inmate-Douglas Bennett revealed later in several lawsuits about the illegal food used in prison.

== Cast ==
- Scott Plank – Kevin Francke
- Anna Gunn – Liz Godlove
- Andrew Prine – John Nelson
- Angelina Jolie – Jodie Swearingen
- Paul Perri – Sgt. Unsoeld
- Ernie Garrett - Michael Francke
- Edwin Collier - Paul Fisk
