= Alysia Reiner =

American actress

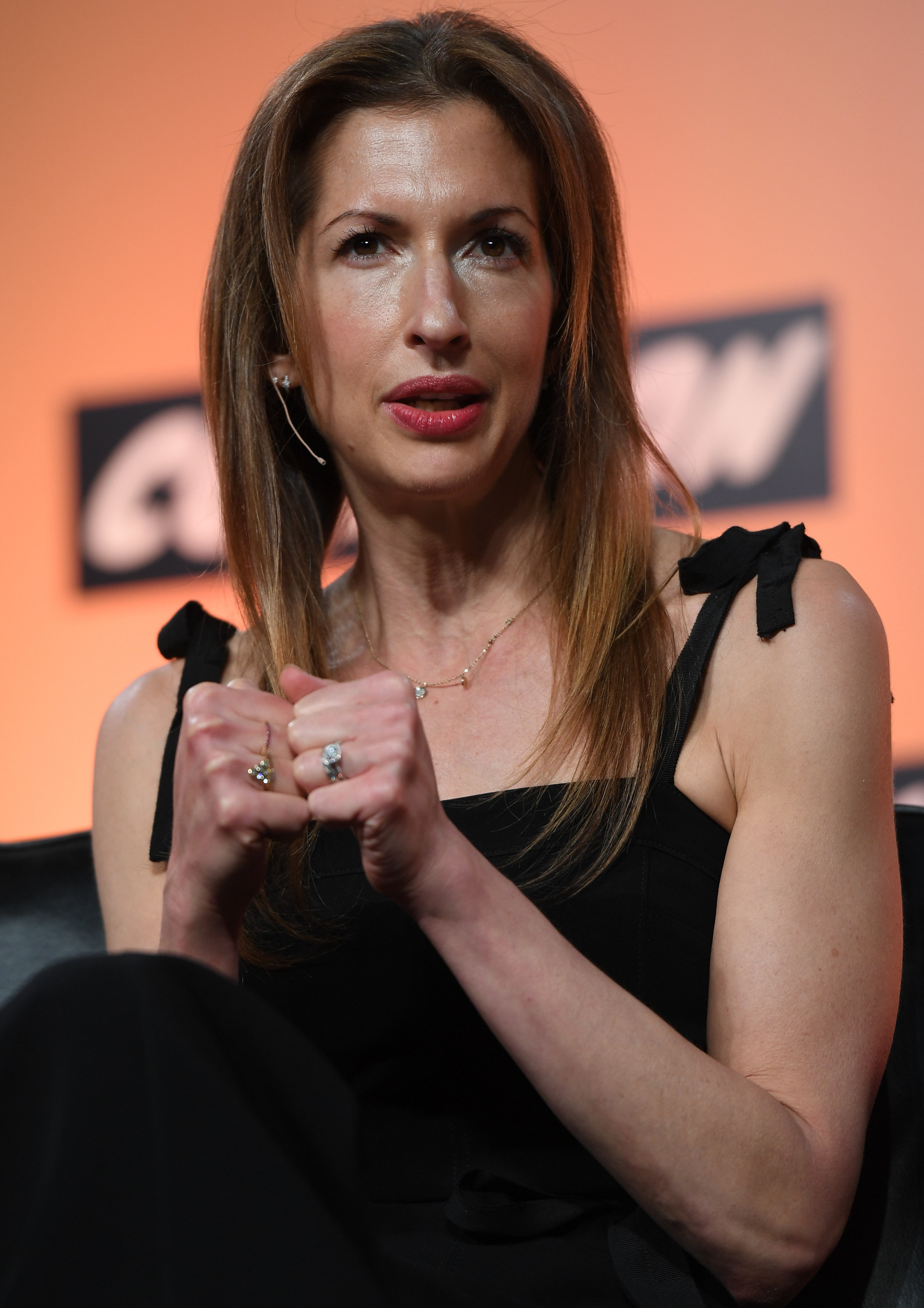
- Reiner in May 2017
- Born: Gainesville, Florida, U.S.
- Education: Vassar College
- Occupation: Actress
- Years active: 1993–present
- Known for: Natalie "Fig" Figueroa in Orange Is the New Black (2013–2019)
- Spouse: David Alan Basche (m. 1997)
- Children: 1

Alysia Reiner is an American actress. She is best known for playing Natalie "Fig" Figueroa in the Netflix comedy drama series Orange Is the New Black (2013–2019), for which she won a Screen Actors Guild Award for her role as part of the ensemble cast.

Reiner starred in and produced the financial drama Equity, which was bought at Sundance by Sony Pictures Classics and released nationwide. It was set to be developed into a TV series by Tri-Star and ABC. She also originated the role of DODC Agent Sadie Deever in the Disney+/Marvel series Ms. Marvel and joined the cast of The Diplomat for its second and third seasons. Reiner has appeared in several Off-Broadway plays and won an Obie Award for her performance in An Oak Tree. In Sideways, the critically acclaimed comedy-drama film, Reiner played Christine Ergarian, for which she won her first ensemble cast SAG Award. She played District Attorney Wendy Parks in the ABC crime-legal drama TV series How to Get Away with Murder and Sunny in the FX comedy Better Things. In 2016, she also appeared in Season 4 of Masters of Sex on Showtime, as Lilian Izikoff on Rosewood, and Trina in the TBS series Search Party.

== Early life ==
Reiner was born in Gainesville, Florida, in 1970. She graduated from Vassar College and studied acting at the British American Drama Academy and the National Theater Institute at the Eugene O'Neill Theater Center. Reiner is Jewish.

== Career ==
=== Theatre ===
She joined Tim Crouch in the Obie Award–winning An Oak Tree at The Barrow Street and Jayson with a Y with The New Group. At The Beckett, she played roles in Anaïs Nin: One of Her Lives and Wasps in Bed. She has been deemed an "Off-Broadway Favorite" by Theatremania and was called "priceless" by The New York Times. In 2025, Reiner starred in the world premiere of Keiko Green's You Are Cordially Invited to the End of the World. She also appeared in the New York premiere of David Edgar's Pentecost.

=== Film and television ===
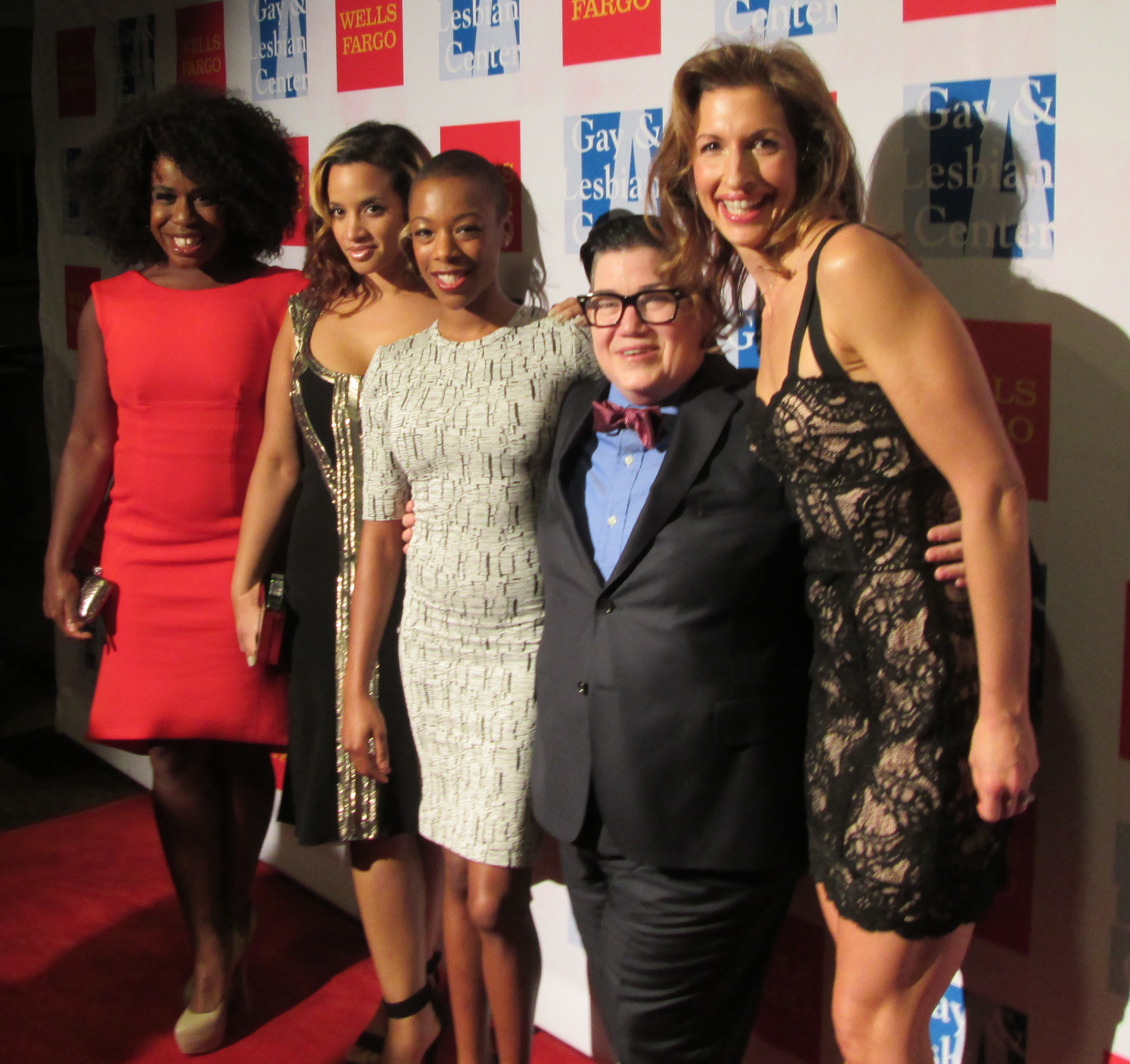
Reiner with Orange Is the New Black cast in 2013

Reiner has appeared in several films, including Kissing Jessica Stein, The Vicious Kind, Arranged, Schooled, That Awkward Moment, and 5 Flights Up. In 2004, she played the role of Christine Erganian, Thomas Haden Church's character's fiancée, in the film Sideways, which won the Screen Actors Guild Award for Outstanding Performance by a Cast in a Motion Picture. She also had roles in several independent films.

On television, Reiner has appeared on more than 50 shows as series regular, guest star or in recurring roles, including Natalie Figueroa in the Netflix comedy-drama series Orange Is the New Black. In 2014 she joined the cast of ABC legal drama series,How to Get Away with Murder produced by Shonda Rhimes, in a recurring role of D.A. Wendy Parks, a prosecutor who goes up against Viola Davis' character. In 2018 Reiner joined the cast of The Deuce as agent Kiki Rains.

In 2014, Reiner announced that she would be launching Broad Street Pictures to produce films with strong female roles.

As a producer, Reiner produced and starred in the motherhood comedy Egg with Christina Hendricks and Anna Camp, which premiered at the Tribeca Film Festival. She also starred in Stampede Ventures' feature Going Places and produced and appeared in the film Ramona at Midlife.

== Awards and honors ==
In addition to her Screen Actors Guild Award, Reiner received the inaugural Acclaimed Collaboration Award from the Women in the Arts & Media Coalition in 2019 for her work on Egg. She received the MUSE "Made in NY" Award from the Mayor's Office of Media and Entertainment and NYWIFT in 2017. She has also received the Sarah Powell Huntington Leadership Award from the Women's Prison Association.

== Personal life ==
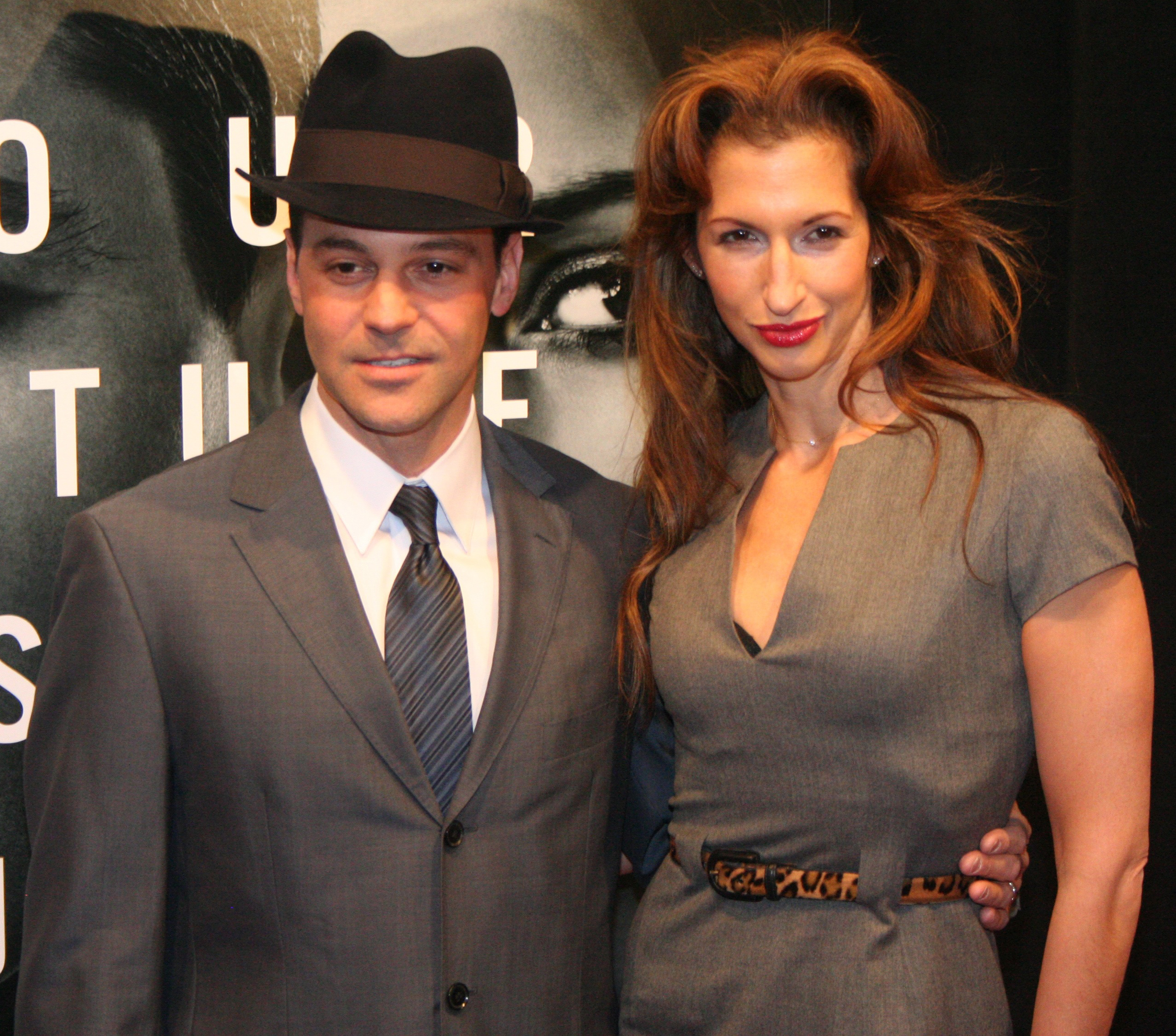
Reiner with husband David Alan Basche in 2011

Reiner has been married to actor David Alan Basche since 1997. The couple have a daughter and reside in Harlem, New York City.

Reiner is involved with many nonprofit organizations and charities, including the Cancer Support Community, Actors for Autism, PEN International, SAY: The Stuttering Association for the Young, Bent on Learning, Safe Kids Worldwide, The Young Women's Leadership Network, Amnesty International, Cool Effect, and Election Defenders. Before the 2022 midterm elections, Reiner posted on Instagram using the #IDCHECK hashtag, asking voters to check their IDs to make sure they meet local requirements and citing VoteRiders as a resource for voter ID information and assistance.

== Filmography ==
=== Film ===
Year	Title	Role	Notes
1999	Row Your Boat		Scenes deleted
1999	The Stand-In	Soap opera nurse	
2000	Little Pieces	Casting director	
2001	Kissing Jessica Stein	Schuller Gallery Artist	
2002	Hourly Rates	Gail	
2004	Sideways	Christine Erganian	
2004	The Three Body Problem	Nina	Short film
2005	One Last Thing...	Tai Uhlmann	
2006	A-List	Reporter	
2006	Cycle Unknown	Marie	Short film
2006	The Narrow Gate	Rachel	
2007	Arranged	Leah	
2007	Schooled	Miss Luna Hill	
2008	The Peppermint Tree	Laura	
2009	The Vicious Kind	Samantha	
2009	The Jacket	Joan	Short film
2009	Speed Grieving	Malia	Short film
2012	Backwards	Meghan	
2012	Delivering the Goods	New Head Chef	
2013	King Theodore Live	Jordyn	Short film
2014	That Awkward Moment	Amanda	
2014	The Story of Milo & Annie	Mercedes	Short film
2014	Kelly & Cal	Trish	
2014	Fort Tilden	Cobble Hill Mom	
2014	Revenge of the Green Dragons	TV News Reporter	
2014	5 Flights Up	Blue Leggings	
2014	Primrose Lane	Theodocia	
2014	The Girl in the Book	Interviewer	
2014	No Letting Go	Lisa	
2015	Ava's Possessions	Noelle	
2015	The Networker	Beth	
2015	The Other Side	Rivka	
2016	Equity	Public Attorney Samantha Ryan	Also producer
2017	The Female Brain	Erin	
2018	Egg	Tina	Also producer
2018	An Acceptable Loss	National Security Advisor	
2020	School Spirits	Canaldi	
2021	A Mouthful of Air	Pam	
2021	Spider-Man: No Way Home	Agent Sadie Deever	Uncredited cameo
2022	So Cold the River	Alyssa Bradford-Cohen	
2022	The Independent	Kathy Gibbs	
2023	The Feeling That the Time for Doing Something Has Passed	Sister	
2025	O Horizon	Dr. Sandra Williams	
2025	Ramona at Midlife	Gwen Carmine	Also producer
2025	Marshmallow	Mom	

=== Television ===
Year	Title	Role	Notes
1999	Law & Order	Gretchen Stewart	Episode: "Sundown"
2000	Family Law	Ms. Holland	Episode: "Echoes"
2002	The Drew Carey Show	Sally	Episode: "What Women Don't Want"
2002	Law & Order: Special Victims Unit	Cindy Kerber	Episode: "Juvenile"
2003	Law & Order: Criminal Intent	Leslie Hurst	Episode: "Stray"
2004	The Jury	Dr. Ainsley Solomon	Episode: "The Boxer"
2006	The Sopranos	Linda Vaughn	Episode: "Mr. & Mrs. John Sacrimoni Request..."
2006	Love Monkey	Megan	Episode: "Coming Out"
2008	The Starter Wife	Cindy	2 episodes
2009	Law & Order: Criminal Intent	Paula O'Keefe	Episode: "Lady's Man"
2009	White Collar	Manager	Episode: "Free Fall"
2009	30 Rock	Real Estate Agent	Episode: "Sun Tea"
2010	Law & Order: Criminal Intent	Michelle Linden	Episode: "Lost Children of the Blood"
2010	Law & Order	Amy Felner	Episode: "Love Eternal"
2011	Blue Bloods	Hannah	Episode: "Model Behavior"
2012	The Exes	Cindy	Episode: "The Party"
2013–2019	Orange Is the New Black	Natalie "Fig" Figueroa	47 episodes Screen Actors Guild Award for Outstanding Performance by an Ensemble in a Comedy Series
2014	Hawaii Five-O	Special Agent Chapman	Episode: "Ka No'eau"
2014–2015	How to Get Away with Murder	D.A. Wendy Parks	4 episodes
2015	Bones	Amelia Minchin	Episode: "The Lost in the Found"
2016	Unforgettable	Joyce Chen	Episode: "Breathing Space"
2016	The Mysteries of Laura	Liz Walters	Episode: "The Mystery of the Political Operation"
2016	Rosewood	Lilian Izikoff	2 episodes
2016	Masters of Sex	Anita	Episode: "Freefall"
2016	Search Party	Trina	2 episodes
2016–2022	Better Things	Sunny	15 episodes
2017	Odd Mom Out	Prosecutor	Episode: "Jury Doody"
2017	Chopped	Herself	Episode: "Star Power: Screen Sensations!"
2017	Younger	Louise	Episode: "A Novel Marriage"
2017	Broad City		Episode: "Mushrooms"
2018	The Blacklist	Judge Sonia Fisher	Episode: "The Informant (No. 118)"
2018–2019	The Deuce	Kiki Rains	10 episodes
2018–2020	Butterbean's Café	Ms. Marmalady (voice)	18 episodes
2019	Bubble Guppies	Computer Voice (voice)	Episode: "Secret Agent Nonny!"
2019	All Rise	Deb Thompson	Episode: "The Joy from Oz"
2021	Helpsters	Bowling Babette	Episode: "Freeze Pop Felix / Bowling Babette"
2022	Law & Order	Grace Pollard	Episode: "Only the Lonely"
2022	Ms. Marvel	Agent Sadie Deever	4 episodes
2022–2023	Shining Vale	Kathryn Dunn	7 episodes
2023	The Rookie	Lieutenant Pine	2 episodes
2024–2025	The Diplomat	Agent Ivy Griffin	3 episodes
2026	Stranger Things: Tales from '85	Karen Wheeler (voice)	Episode: "Chapter One: Welcome to Hawkins, New Kid"

=== Podcasts ===
Year	Title	Role	Notes
2021–2022	Around the Sun	Sam (voice)	2 episodes; audio drama
