= Amy Fox =

Amy Fox may refer to:

- Amy Fox (playwright), American playwright and screenwriter
- Amy Fox (Blue Heelers), a fictional character in the Australian TV series Blue Heelers
