= Ted Sullivan (filmmaker) =

American television writer

Edward "Ted" Sullivan is an American television writer.

== Early life ==
Sullivan is a graduate of the University of Southern California Film Writing School, where he also taught as an adjunct professor of screenwriting.

== Career ==
Sullivan began his writing career with the daytime dramas As the World Turns and One Life to Live, before transitioning into directing and producing with the Off-Broadway comedy productions of "What If We Did This?" and "We're Not That Way."

He directed and edited commercials, documentaries and new media campaigns for various companies, including ABC Network, Pollinator Press, Saab and Holiday Inn Express. In 2007, he co-wrote, edited and produced the independent family comedy I'll Believe You starring David Alan Basche, Patrick Warburton and Chris Elliott. The film was directed and co-written by his TV producer brother Paul Francis Sullivan.

He wrote for Law & Order: Criminal Intent, starring Jeff Goldblum and Saffron Burrows, Rizzoli & Isles with Angie Harmon and Sasha Alexander, and Supergirl.Sullivan's other writing credits include ABC's Revenge, starring Emily VanCamp and Madeleine Stowe and the Marvel Graphic Novel Revenge: The Secret Origin of Emily Thorne. Rece In 2017 he was a writer for Star Trek: Discovery and went on to write for Riverdale.
