= Sarah Megan Thomas =

American actor, writer, and film maker

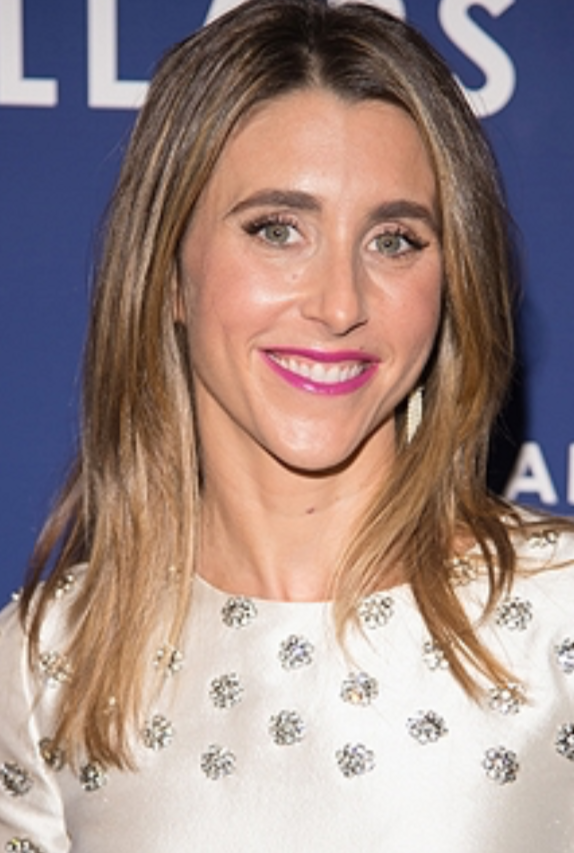
Sarah Megan Thomas

Sarah Megan Thomas is an American actress, writer, director, and producer. Thomas created the concept, co-wrote the story, produced, and starred in the Sony Pictures Classics film Equity, which premiered at Sundance and was a New York Times Critic's Pick when released theatrically nationwide.

In 2020 Thomas released the feature film, A Call to Spy, which she wrote, produced, and starred in as the American spy, Virginia Hall. The film was well received, providing "fuel to the specialty box office” in a pandemic landscape. It was awarded the 2020 Anti-Defamation League "Stand Up" Award as part of the film's premiere at the Santa Barbara International Film Festival. IndieWire noted her performance in particular by saying "Sarah Megan Thomas is the standout." In 2017, Fortune selected Thomas for their "Most Powerful Women, Next Generation" list, featuring her as a panelist in their annual summit.

== Early life and education ==
From Haverford, Pennsylvania on the Philadelphia Main Line, Thomas participated in theater at the Shipley School, and sports such as cross-country, basketball, and rowing. As an undergraduate at Williams College acting became her primary focus and she completed studies overseas at Drama Studio London and the Royal Academy of Dramatic Art. Thomas moved to New York to pursue acting.

== Career ==
Thomas starred off-Broadway as Berowne in the gender-reversed Love's Labour's Lost. She starred as Eva Braun in the off-Broadway show, Summit Conference.

Thomas wrote, produced, and starred in the 2012 film Backwards, a rowing-centered romance with James Van Der Beek in which Thomas plays an Olympic hopeful who fails to make it to compete in the rowing at the Summer Olympics and returns home instead to coach on the Schuylkill River. The film used footage from the actual Stotesbury Regatta, the world's oldest high school rowing competition. When she was a competing rower herself Thomas and her high school boat competed at the Henley Royal Regatta.

For 2016's Equity, Thomas again had story and producer credits in addition to co-starring alongside Anna Gunn. Equity was the first female driven Wall Street feature. The 2016 Sundance Film Festival selection was acquired by Sony Pictures Classics. Equity was bought by ABC to develop into a pilot with Sarah Executive Producing alongside Amy Pascal.

Thomas started researching the secret British World War II organization the Special Operations Executive (SOE), and the female agents they employed, whilst she was on the press tour for Equity in 2016, before talking to living relatives of the agents and analyzing the spy files of the agents. The resulting 2019 film, A Call to Spy, follows these Special Operations Executive agents who aided in the French Resistance against the Nazi regime and includes real life characters such as Virginia Hall, Vera Atkins, Noor Inayat Khan and Maurice Buckmaster. Written, produced and starring Thomas as Virginia Hall, A Call to Spy was directed by Lydia Dean Pilcher. The Guardian described a ‘meticulous depiction of female war-time agents’ as Thomas portrays Hall's rise through the spy ranks to being smuggled into the hub of the French resistance in Lyon in Vichy France. A Call To Spy was released by IFC Films domestically, and praised by the CIA for its technical accuracy. Internationally, Amazon acquired the film as an "Amazon Original" in India.

== Filmography ==
Year	Title	Actor	Writer	Producer	Notes	Ref.
2012	Backwards	Yes	Yes	Yes		
2016	Equity	Yes	Yes	Yes		
2019	A Call to Spy	Yes	Yes	Yes		

== Personal life ==
Her parents, Regina O’Brien Thomas and Frank M. Thomas Jr., are both lawyers. Her father has his own practice in Haverford. Her mother is a partner at a firm in Philadelphia. Sarah Megan Thomas was married to Jason Steven Donehue on May 31, 2008, at St. Mary's Roman Catholic Church in Philadelphia.
