= Butterbean's Café =

Animated fantasy television series

- Genre: Fantasy; Comedy
- Created by: Jonny Belt; Robert Scull
- Written by: Leah Gotcsik
- Voices of: Margaret Ying Drake; Gabriella Pizzolo; Kirrilee Berger; Olivia Grace Manning; Koda Gursoy; Quinn Breslin; Alysia Reiner
- Theme music composer: Matthew Tishler; Jeannie Lurie
- Composer: Mike Barnett
- Countries of origin: United States; Ireland
- Original language: English
- No. of seasons: 2
- No. of episodes: 60 (list of episodes)

Production
- Executive producers: Jonny Belt; Robert Scull
- Producer: Lorraine Morgan
- Running time: 22 minutes
- Production companies: Brown Bag Films; Nickelodeon Animation Studio

Original release
- Network: Nickelodeon (2018–2019); Nick Jr. Channel (2019–2020)
- Release: November 12, 2018 – November 1, 2020

Butterbean's Café is an animated culinary fantasy children's television series created by Jonny Belt and Robert Scull and ordered by Nickelodeon. Principally animated by Ireland-based Brown Bag Films, it ran on Nickelodeon and its sister channel Nick Jr. for 2 seasons and 60 episodes from November 12, 2018, to November 1, 2020.

Involving "creative cooking, a farm-to-table philosophy and a social-emotional curriculum that focuses on leadership skills", a total of 40 episodes were ordered for its inaugural season. On June 4, 2019, the series was renewed for a second season and moved to the Nick Jr. Channel the same year on August 25.

== Premise ==
The series is set in the magical land of Puddlebrook and follows its titular character, Butterbean, a fairy who opens up and works in her own café, with the help of sister Cricket and friends Poppy, Dazzle, and Jasper. The patrons of the café consists of anthropomorphic chipmunks and rabbits.

Next to the café is grumpy Ms. Marmalady, who plots to put Butterbean out of business, only to fail every time. There is a running gag where a character (which the episode varies and mostly centers around on) breaks the fourth wall by talking to the viewer in a documentary-style confession where they explain the various situations happening at the moment.

Working together, the fairies whip up amazing treats in most of the episode. If the treat is successfully saved, Butterbean plants a colorful surprise bean producing special effects based on it, depending on the episode, to which she calls "The Fairy Finish".

== Characters ==
- Butterbean (voiced by Margaret Ying Drake in US and Lily Wilmott in UK), a fairy who owns a café. Her wings have sprinkles and her cooking tool is a whisk.
- Cricket (voiced by Gabriella Pizzolo in US and Amelie Halls in UK), Butterbean's younger sister. Her wings have hearts and her cooking tool is an icing bag.
- Poppy (voiced by Kirrilee Berger in US and Alisia-Mai Goscomb in UK), a fairy who runs the kitchen. Her wings have flowers and her cooking tool is a kitchen spoon.
- Dazzle (voiced by Olivia Grace Manning in US and Imogen Sharp in UK), a fairy who is an embodiment of an African girl, and runs the café's front counter. Her wings have stars and her cooking tool is a stylus.
- Jasper (voiced by Koda Gursoy for season 1 and Quinn Breslin for season 2 in the US and Eric O'Carroll in season 1 and Alexander James in season 2 in the UK), a fairy delivery boy. His wings have a lightning and his cooking tool is a spatula.
- Cookie, a winged, flying cat who lives in Butterbean's Café.
- Ms. Marmalady (voiced by Alysia Reiner in US and Judy Emmett in UK), Butterbean's foil and the main antagonist. Because she and her workers produce sub-par products, her café hardly gets customers. She has a sister named Martha.
- Spork and Spatch (both voiced by Chris Phillips in US and both voiced by Mike Cross in UK), Ms. Marmalady's bumbling monkey employees.
- Marzipan, a dark grey cat owned by Ms. Marmalady.

== Episodes ==
| Season | Segments | Episodes | Originally released | |
| Season | Segments | Episodes | First released | Last released |
|---|---|---|---|---|
| 1 | 72 | 39 | November 12, 2018 | December 29, 2019 |
| 2 | 39 | 21 | January 12, 2020 | November 1, 2020 |

== Media ==
Nickelodeon and Paramount Home Entertainment has released episodes of this show on DVD both under its eponymous name and the title Let's Get Cooking!.

On June 7, 2023, Butterbean's Café was added to Paramount+ but has since been removed (as of April 2024).

== Nominations ==
| Year | Award | Category | Nominee | Result | Ref. |
|---|---|---|---|---|---|
| 2019 | Daytime Emmy Awards | Outstanding Performer in a Preschool Animated Program | Olivia Grace Manning | Nominated | |

== Ratings ==
The series' debut on November 12, 2018 yielded Nickelodeon "its highest-rated preschool series debut since the 2013 launch of Paw Patrol", drawing 727,000 kids between ages 2 to 5 and 2 million total viewers.

Viewership and ratings per season of Butterbean's Café
| Season | Episodes | First aired | | Last aired | | Avg. viewers (millions) |
| Season | Episodes | Date | Viewers (millions) | Date | Viewers (millions) | Avg. viewers (millions) |
|---|---|---|---|---|---|---|
| 1 | 55 | November 12, 2018 | 1.28 | December 29, 2019 | 0.33 | 0.59 |
| 2 | 20 | January 12, 2020 | 0.35 | November 1, 2020 | 0.32 | 0.35 |
