= David Alan Basche =

American actor (born 1968)

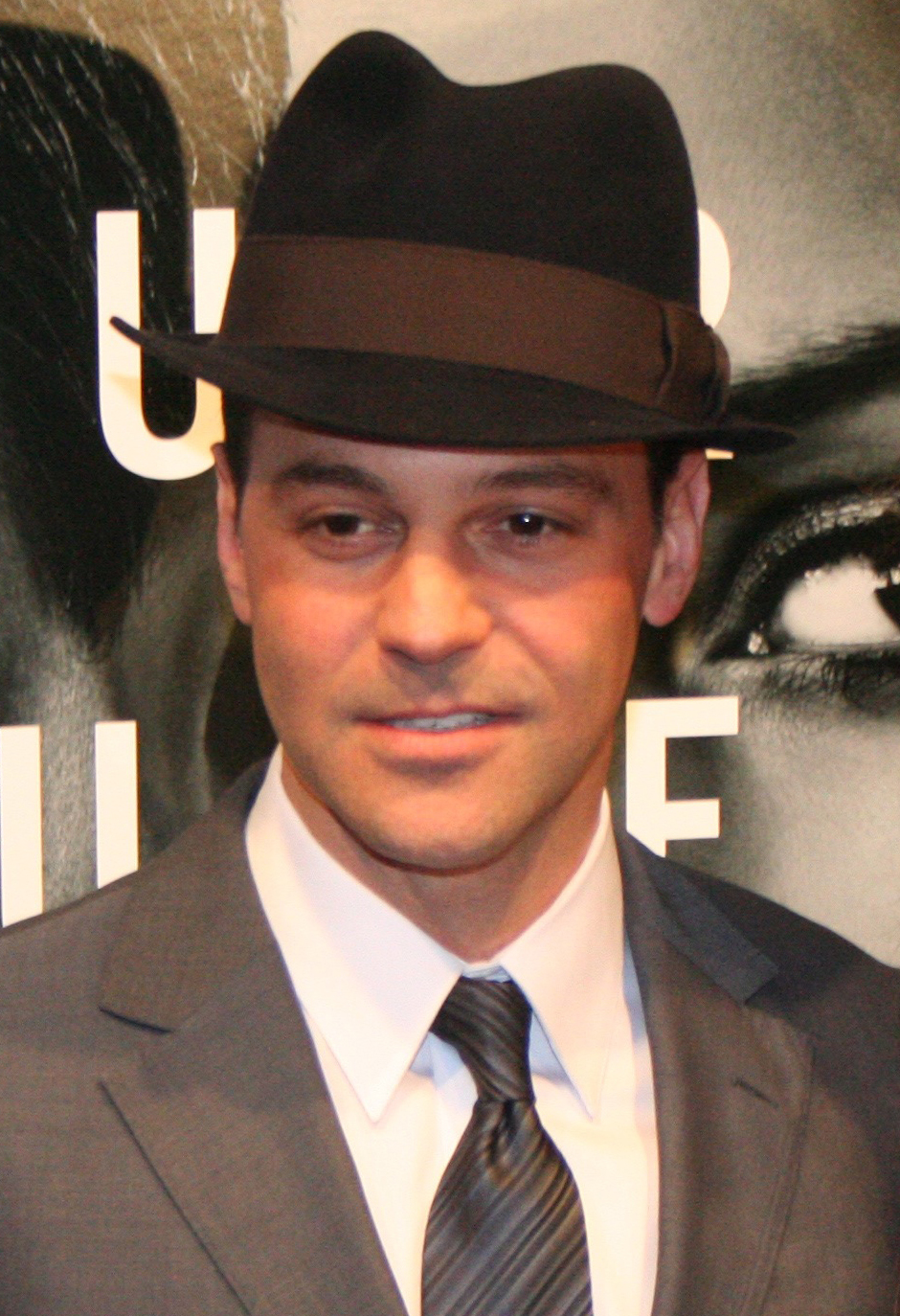
- Basche in February 2011
- Born: August 25, 1968 (age 58)
- Education: Emerson College
- Occupations: Film, stage, television actor
- Years active: 1997–present
- Spouse: Alysia Reiner (m. 1997)
- Children: 1

David Alan Basche (born August 25, 1968) is an American actor. He is best known for playing Todd Beamer in the film United 93. He has been a series regular on many TV comedies and dramas, and has also appeared in films directed by Steven Spielberg, Martin Scorsese, Paul Greengrass, Shawn Levy, Robert Zemeckis, and Michael Patrick King.

== Life and career ==
Basche's first acting role was in a school production of The Adventures of Tom Sawyer when he was in the sixth grade at West Hartford's Norfeldt Elementary School. Basche, who describes his demeanor then as an "angry, smart-ass kid," tried out for and landed the lead role after a school counselor suggested he take up acting to channel some of his anger and emotion. Basche appeared in several plays presented by the Greater Hartford Jewish Community Center while he was a student at King Philip Middle School, and he had roles in 10 school plays during his four years at William H. Hall High School in West Hartford. Basche then went on to Emerson College, starting out as a communications major before switching to performing arts.

His first major exposure was starring in Oh Grow Up, a short-lived sitcom created by Alan Ball. He later played the role of Steven Keats for two seasons in the NBC sitcom Three Sisters. He appeared in the 2005 film War of the Worlds in the role of Tim, the stepfather of Dakota Fanning and Justin Chatwin's characters. In 2006, he played Todd Beamer in United 93. David landed the lead role in 2007's I'll Believe You, a family-friendly sci-fi comedy. In 2008 he portrayed Mike Harness in Lipstick Jungle on NBC for two seasons, while simultaneously playing the role of Kenny Kagan on The Starter Wife on USA Network. In 2010 he guest starred on Law & Order: Special Victims Unit, White Collar, Law & Order: Criminal Intent and The Mentalist. Basche also appeared in the film Sex and the City 2 as a wedding guest, and had a small role in the 2017 mystery film The Vanishing of Sidney Hall.

Basche starred for four seasons in the TV Land original series The Exes, which premiered on November 30, 2011. The series ended on September 16, 2015.

== Personal life ==
Basche is married to actress Alysia Reiner; they met during a summer stock production of William Shakespeare's Twelfth Night. The couple has a daughter born December 5, 2008.

== Professional credits ==
=== New York Theater ===
Title	Role	Location	Ref.
Snakebit	Jonathan	Drama Desk, Outer Critics Circle Nominated Play	
Love in the Age of Narcissism	Join	The Directors Company	
Visiting Mr. Green	Ross Gardiner	Union Square Theater (with Eli Wallach)	
WASPs In Bed	Allan	Beckett Theatre	
Don't Let Destiny Push You Around	Jack	John Montgomery Theater	
Macbeth	MacDuff	The Promenade Theatre	
Measure for Measure	Angelo	New Generations NY	

=== Regional theater ===
Title	Role	Location	Ref.
Dating Games	Daniel/Spence	The Lillian Theatre, Los Angeles	
September Forever	Henry	Williamstown Theatre Festival	
The Golden Age	Tom	Theatreworks Hartford (with Elizabeth Franz)	
Romeo and Juliet	Gregory	Hartford Stage Company	
A Dybbuk	Reb Mal/Yeshiva	Hartford Stage Company	
Death of a Salesman	Biff Loman	New Jersey Shakespeare Festival	

=== Film ===
Year	Title	Role	Notes	Ref.
2002	Full Frontal	Nicholas' Agent		
2005	Crazylove	Paul		
2005	War of the Worlds	Tim		
2006	United 93	Todd Beamer		
2006	The Wedding Weekend	Steven		
2006	I'll Believe You	Dale Sweeney		
2007	Schooled	Cool High School Drama Teacher		
2008	Quality Time	Ray	Short film	
2008	The Other Way Round	Deposition Lawyer	Short film	
2008	The Peppermint Tree	Brian		
2009	Salamander	Katie's Dad	Short film	
2009	Speed Grieving	David	Short film	
2010	Sex and the City 2	David		
2011	The Adjustment Bureau	Thompson's Aide		
2011	Real Steel	ESPN Commentator		
2012	Backwards	Cox		
2016	Equity	Ian		
2017	The Vanishing of Sidney Hall	Senator Dale		
2018	Egg	Don		
2018	Almost Home	BMW John (Kevin)		
2021	Know Fear	Donald		
2022	Glimpse	Phil		
2024	A Complete Unknown	John Henry Hammond		

=== Television ===
Year	Title	Role	Notes	Ref.
1997	As the World Turns	Officer Tate	1 episode	
1998, 2006, 2009	Law & Order	Jack McKinney (1998); Attorney Tepper (2006); Kevin Franklin (2009)	3 episodes	
1999	Oh Grow Up	Norris Michelsky	Main role; 13 episodes	
2001	The Division	Mr. Glenmark	Episode: "Obsessions"	
2001	Ed	Bud Frankel	Episode: "Prom Night"	
2001–2002	Three Sisters	Steven Keats	Main role; 19 episodes	
2002	CSI: Crime Scene Investigation	Gordon Daimler; Adam van der Welk	Episode: "Cross Jurisdictions"	
2003	Frasier	Woody Wiswell	2 episodes	
2003	Miss Match	Brian	2 episodes	
2004	Carry Me Home	Bernard	TV movie	
2004	Mister Ed	Wilbur Pope	TV movie	
2005	Rescue Me	Steve Bowden	2 episodes	
2005	Play Dates	Jake	TV movie	
2006, 2011	Law & Order: Criminal Intent	David Kellen (2006); Jay Kendall (2011)	2 episodes	
2007	30 Rock	Alan	Episode: "Hard Ball"	
2008	Lipstick Jungle	Mike Harness	6 episodes	
2008	The Starter Wife	Kenny Kagan	Main role; 10 episodes	
2009	Royal Pains	Rob Miller	Episode: "No Man is An Island"	
2010	Law & Order: Special Victims Unit	Michael Gallagher	Episode: "Savior"	
2010	White Collar	Gary Jennings	Episode: "Need to Know"	
2010	The Mentalist	Dr. Jack Wilder	Episode: "Jolly Red Elf"	
2011–2015	The Exes	Stuart Gardiner	Main role; 64 episodes	
2013	Person of Interest	Wayne Kruger	Episode: "Nothing to Hide"	
2015	Chicago P.D.	Jim Sheltie	Episode: "Never Forget I Love You"	
2016	Elementary	Warren Clift	Episode: "A Burden of Blood"	
2016	Blindspot	Patrick Lyman	Episode: "Mans Telepathic Loyal Lookouts"	
2016	Blue Bloods	Joe Pelligrino	Episode: "The Price of Justice"	
2016	Better Things	Greg	Episode: "Alarms"	
2017	NCIS: New Orleans	Devon Mitchell	Episode: "End of the Line"	
2017	The Blacklist: Redemption	Jack Thornton	Episode: "Operation Davenport"	
2019	Bull	David Newton	Episode: "Pillar of Salt"	
2019	Instinct	Steve Gerich	Episode: "Big Splash"	
2019	Bluff City Law	Dr. Lee Pyle	Episode: "American Epidemic"	
2023	Lioness	Dr. Brumley	Episode: "Bruise Like a Fist"	
2024	The Diplomat	Brad Chapman	Episode: "The Ides of March"	
