= Egg (2018 film) =

- Theatrical release poster
- Directed by: Marianna Palka
- Written by: Risa Mickenberg
- Produced by: David Alan Basche; Michele Ganeless; Alysia Reiner
- Starring: Christina Hendricks; Alysia Reiner; David Alan Basche; Gbenga Akinnagbe; Anna Camp
- Cinematography: Zelmira Gainza
- Edited by: Sophie Corra
- Music by: Jamie Jackson
- Production company: Over. Easy.
- Distributed by: Gravitas Ventures
- Release dates: April 21, 2018 (Tribeca Film Festival); January 18, 2019 (United States)
- Running time: 95 minutes
- Country: United States
- Language: English

Egg is a 2018 American comedy film directed by Marianna Palka and written by Risa Mickenberg. The film stars Christina Hendricks, Alysia Reiner, David Alan Basche, Anna Camp and Gbenga Akinnagbe. The plot centers on conceptual artist Tina (Reiner), when she introduces her eight-month pregnant art school rival (Hendricks) to her non-traditional surrogate Kiki (Camp), the truth comes out and the patriarchy fights to hang on.

== Synopsis ==
An unflinching comedy about why women choose motherhood, why they revere it, fear it, and why some women choose to forgo it. Over the course of one explosive evening, two couples and a surrogate must face their own ridiculous and sometimes heartbreaking shortcomings.

== Cast ==
- Christina Hendricks as Karen
- Alysia Reiner as Tina
- David Alan Basche as Don
- Anna Camp as Kiki
- Gbenga Akinnagbe as Wayne

== Release ==
Egg premiered at the Tribeca Film Festival on April 21, 2018. The film was released theatrically and digitally in the United States on January 18, 2019, by Gravitas Ventures.
