= Anna Gunn =

American actress (born 1968)

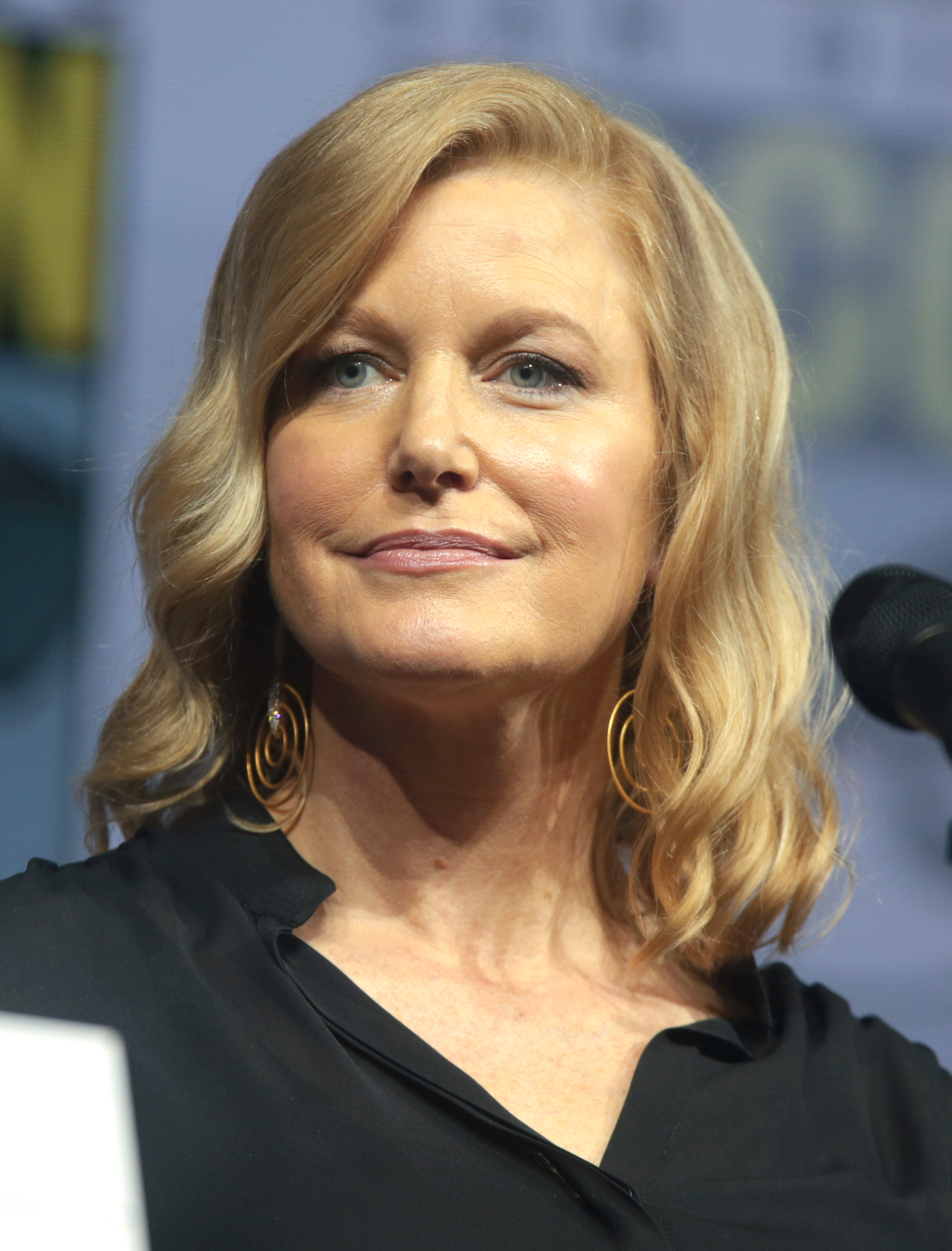
- Gunn at San Diego Comic-Con in 2018
- Born: Anna Kathryn Gunn; August 11, 1968 (age 58); Cleveland, Ohio, U.S
- Education: Northwestern University
- Occupation: Actress
- Years active: 1992–present
- Spouse: Alastair Duncan (m. 1990; div. 2009)
- Children: 2
- Relatives: William R. Day (great-great-grandfather); Luther Day (great-great-great-grandfather)

Anna Kathryn Gunn (born August 11, 1968) is an American actress. She is best known for portraying Skyler White on the AMC crime drama series Breaking Bad (2008–2013), for which she won two Primetime Emmy Awards and a Screen Actors Guild Award.

Gunn has also starred in the legal drama series The Practice (1997–2002), the Western series Deadwood (2004–2006) as Martha Bullock, and the crime drama series Gracepoint (2014). Her film roles include the action thriller Enemy of the State (1998), the independent thriller Red State (2011), the docudrama Little Red Wagon (2012), the financial thriller Equity (2016), the biographical drama Sully (2016), the comedy drama Being Frank (2018), and the Deadwood sequel film Deadwood: The Movie (2019). She also voiced Ariel in the Legacy of Kain video game series (1996–2003).

== Early life and education ==
Anna Kathryn Gunn was born on August 11, 1968, in Cleveland, Ohio, and grew up in Santa Fe, New Mexico, the daughter of Shana (née Peters; 1942–2022) and Clemens "Clem" Earl Gunn Jr. (1939–2024). She has one brother named Matthew. She is the great-great-granddaughter of William Rufus Day (through his son Luther), who was an associate justice of the Supreme Court of the United States.

Gunn graduated from Santa Fe Preparatory School in 1986, then attended Northwestern University in Evanston, Illinois, where she majored in theater and graduated in 1990. In the fall of 1988, she spent a semester abroad to study at the British American Drama Academy. She moved to Laurel Canyon in Los Angeles, California, where she shared a house with Pamela Adlon.

== Career ==
Gunn's first screen credit was the Quantum Leap episode "The Play's the Thing". She had a recurring role as Assistant District Attorney Jean Ward on the ABC series The Practice from 1997 to 2002, and was series regular as Martha Bullock on HBO's Deadwood from 2005 to 2006. She appeared on Seinfeld in the episode "The Glasses", in the Six Feet Under episode "Parallel Play", and on the first season of Murder One. She also provided the voice of Ariel in the Legacy of Kain series of video games.

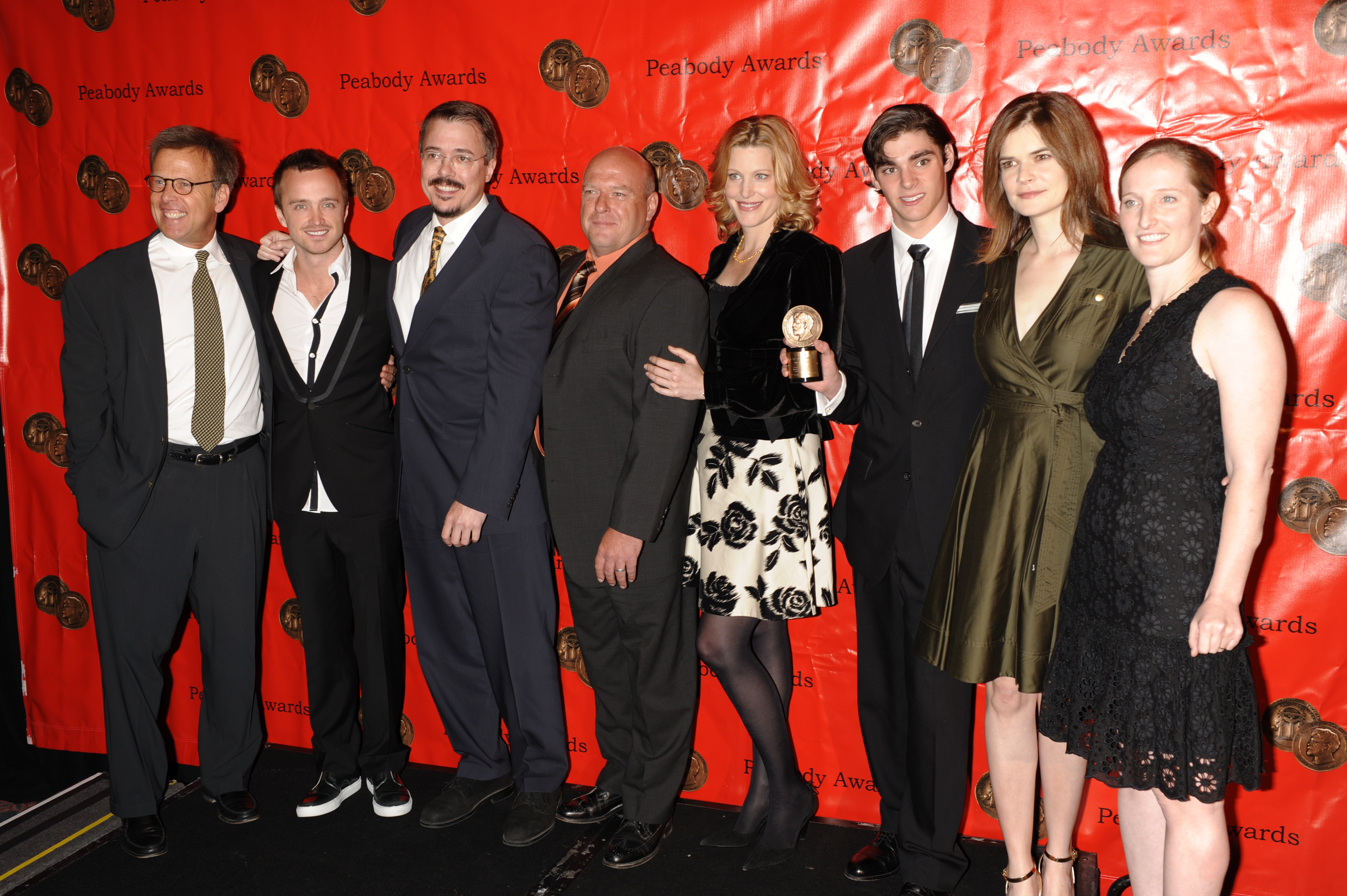
The cast and crew of Breaking Bad at the Peabody Awards in 2009

Gunn starred as Skyler White in the AMC drama series Breaking Bad, for which she was nominated for the Primetime Emmy Award for Outstanding Supporting Actress in a Drama Series in 2012, 2013 and 2014, winning the latter two years. In August 2013, she wrote an op-ed piece for The New York Times examining the public dislike directed toward her character.

In 2011, Gunn had a lead role in the Lifetime film Secrets of Eden, opposite John Stamos. Her other film credits include Without Evidence, Enemy of the State, Treading Water, and Red State.

In February 2013, cable network Bravo announced that Gunn would star in a pilot for a one-hour TV drama, Rita, based on a Danish TV series about a private-school teacher and mother. After Bravo passed on it, Fox TV Studios ordered a pilot to be written by Krista Vernoff and directed by Miguel Arteta, which was never released.

In 2014, Gunn starred Off-Broadway with Billy Magnussen in Sex with Strangers, directed by David Schwimmer at Second Stage Theater.

Gunn starred in the 2016 film Equity. Billed as the first female-driven Wall Street film, it premiered at the 2016 Sundance Film Festival. That same year, she starred in Clint Eastwood's biographical drama film Sully.

In 2019, Gunn starred as Maxine Faulk in the Noël Coward Theater limited-time production of Tennessee Williams' The Night of the Iguana.

== Personal life ==
Gunn married Scottish actor and real estate broker Alastair Duncan in 1990. They divorced in 2009. They have two daughters.

== Filmography ==
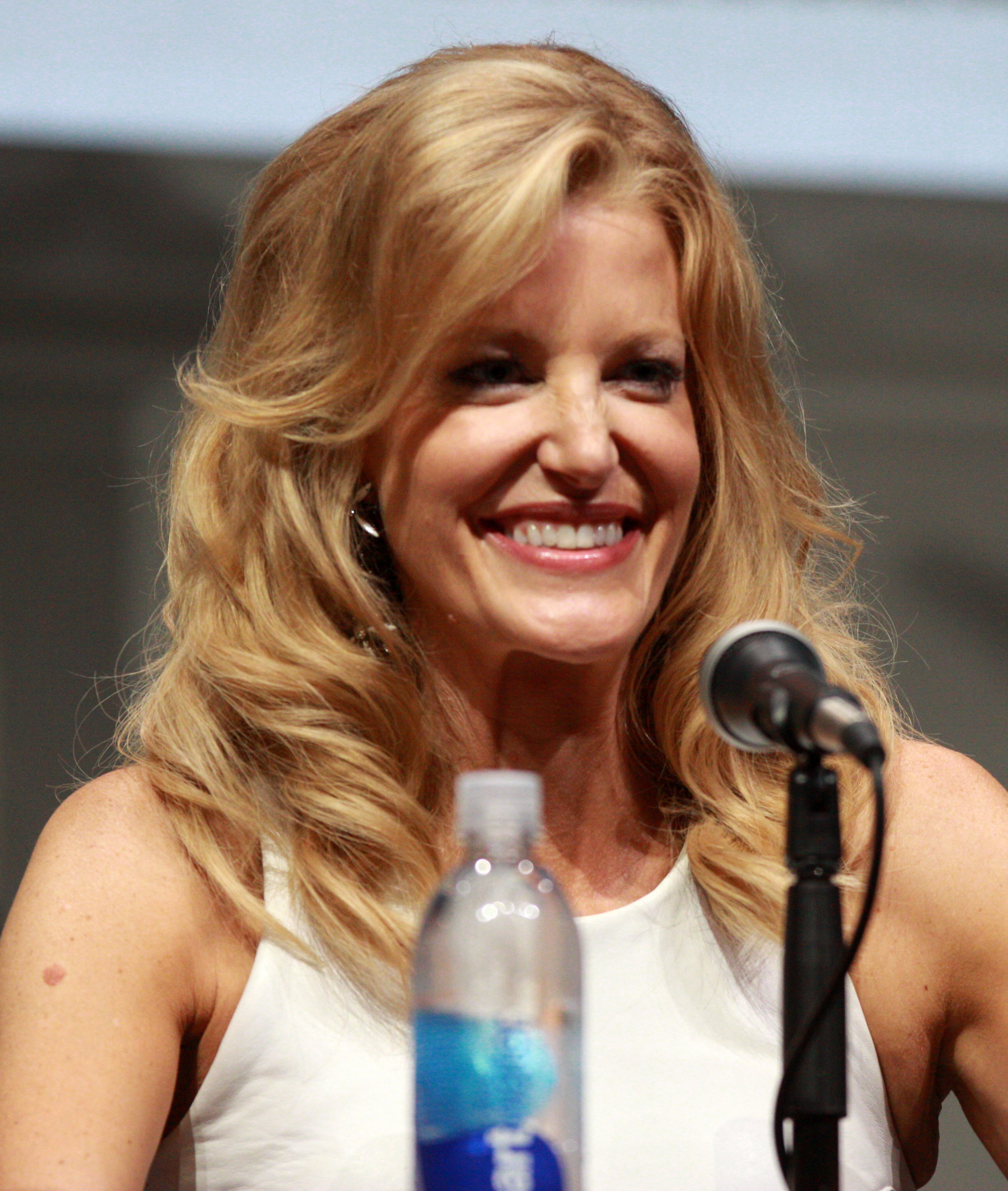
Gunn at San Diego Comic-Con in 2013

=== Film ===
Year	Title	Role	Notes	Ref.
1994	French Intensive	Rachel	Short film	
1994	Junior	Casitas Madres Receptionist		
1995	Without Evidence	Liz Godlove		
1995	Star Power	Denise	Short film	
1997	Santa Fe	Jane		
1998	Enemy of the State	Emily Reynolds		
2000	Lost Souls	Sally Prescott		
2001	Nobody's Baby	Stormy		
2002	Treading Water	The Actress		
2011	Red State	Travis' Mother		
2012	Little Red Wagon	Laurie Bonner		
2012	Sassy Pants	June Pruitt		
2016	Equity	Naomi Bishop		
2016	Sully	Dr. Elizabeth Davis		
2018	Being Frank	Laura Hansen		
2021	Land of Dreams	Nancy		
2022	The Apology	Darlene Hagen		

=== Television ===
Year	Title	Role	Notes	Ref.
1992	Quantum Leap	Liz	Episode: "The Play's the Thing"	
1992	Indecency	Celeste	Television film	
1992–1993	Down the Shore	Arden	Main role	
1993	Seinfeld	Amy	Episode: "The Glasses"	
1994	Missing Persons	Ellie Keogh	Episode: "My Beautiful Son Is O.K..."	
1994	NYPD Blue	Kimmy	2 episodes	
1994	Moment of Truth: Caught in the Crossfire	Agt. Alex King	Television film	
1995	If Someone Had Known	Officer Linda Reed	Television film	
1995–1996	Murder One	Melissa Griotte	3 episodes	
1996	Chicago Hope	Megan Stanard	Episode: "Sexual Perversity in Chicago Hope"	
1996	The Lazarus Man	The Journal	Episode: "The Journal"	
1996	Men Behaving Badly	Michelle	Episode: "Babies Having Babies"	
1996	The Big Easy	Evie	Episode: "Snake Dance"	
1997	Sleepwalkers	Angie Gilpin	Episode: "Night Terrors"	
1997–2002	The Practice	Jean Ward	Recurring role; 10 episodes	
1999	ER	Ekabo's Lawyer	Episode: "Point of Origin"	
1999	The Drew Carey Show	Kelly Walker	Episode: "Drew's Reunion"	
1999	Judging Amy	Emily Noble	Episode: "Presumed Innocent"	
2000	Bull	Miss Coyle	Episode: "A Beautiful Lie"	
2001	The Guardian	Meghan Barstow	2 episodes	
2002	Yes, Dear	Jessica	Episode: "Kim's New Nanny"	
2003	Twelve Mile Road	Leah	Television film	
2003	Dragnet	Dr. Louise Nottingham	2 episodes	
2003	The O'Keefes	Phyllis	Episode: "Pilot"	
2003	L.A. Confidential	Renata	Unsold pilot	
2003	Wild Card	Janell Morgan	Episode: "The Cheese Stands Alone"	
2003	The Lyon's Den	Elizabeth Hopper	Episode: "Blood"	
2003	Miss Match	Maureen Weston	Episode: "Kate in Ex-tasy"	
2003	Miracles	Rebecca Webb	Episode: "You Are My Sunshine"	
2004	NYPD 2069	Natalie Franco	Unsold pilot	
2004	The D.A.	Shelly Ward	Episode: "The People vs. Sergius Kovinsky"	
2004	Six Feet Under	Madeline	Episode: "Parallel Play"	
2005–2006	Deadwood	Martha Bullock	Main role	
2007	Boston Legal	Attorney Susan Bixby	Episode: "Nuts"	
2008–2013	Breaking Bad	Skyler White	Lead role	
2010	Law & Order	Marielle Di Napoli	Episode: "Love Eternal"	
2010	Lie to Me	Jenkins	Episode: "Dirty Loyal"	
2012	Secrets of Eden	Detective Catherine Benincasa	Television film	
2014	The Mindy Project	Sheila Hamilton	Episode: "Girl Crush"	
2014	Gracepoint	Detective Ellie Miller	Main role	
2015	Criminal Minds	Special Agent Lily Lambert	Episode: "Beyond Borders"	
2015	Portlandia	Glynis Brooks	Episode: "House for Sale"	
2016	Robot Chicken	Mother / Skyler White (voice)	Episode: "Food"	
2016	Shades of Blue	Julia Ayres	Recurring role; 10 episodes	
2019	Deadwood: The Movie	Martha Bullock	Television film	
2021	Prodigal Son	Sheriff Fern Cooley	Episode: "The Last Weekend"	
2022–2023	Physical	Marika	3 episodes	
2023	Most Dangerous Game	Chairwoman	4 episodes	
2024	Sugar	Margit Sorensen	Recurring role; 6 episodes	

=== Video games ===
Year	Title	Role	Notes	Ref.
1996	Blood Omen: Legacy of Kain	Ariel	Voice role	
1996	Blood Omen: Legacy of Kain	DeJoule	Voice role	
1996	Blood Omen: Legacy of Kain	Azimuth	Voice role	
1999	Legacy of Kain: Soul Reaver	Ariel	Voice role	
2001	Soul Reaver 2	Ariel	Voice role	
2003	Legacy of Kain: Defiance	Ariel	Voice role	
2026	Legacy of Kain: Ascendance	Ariel		

== Awards and nominations ==
Awards and nominations received by Anna Gunn
Award	Year (Note: Indicates the year of ceremony. Each year is linked to the article about the awards held that year, wherever possible.)	Category	Nominated work	Result	Ref.
Critics' Choice Television Awards	2012	Best Supporting Actress in a Drama Series	Breaking Bad	Nominated	
Critics' Choice Television Awards	2013	Best Supporting Actress in a Drama Series	Breaking Bad	Nominated	
Critics' Choice Television Awards	2014	Best Supporting Actress in a Drama Series	Breaking Bad	Nominated	
Golden Nymph Awards	2013	Outstanding Actress in a Drama Series	Breaking Bad	Nominated	
Online Film & Television Association Awards	2012	Best Supporting Actress in a Drama Series	Breaking Bad	Nominated	
Online Film & Television Association Awards	2013	Best Supporting Actress in a Drama Series	Breaking Bad	Nominated	
Online Film & Television Association Awards	2019	Best Ensemble in a Motion Picture or Limited Series	Deadwood: The Movie	Nominated	
Primetime Emmy Awards	2012	Outstanding Supporting Actress in a Drama Series	Breaking Bad	Nominated	
Primetime Emmy Awards	2013	Outstanding Supporting Actress in a Drama Series	Breaking Bad	Won	
Primetime Emmy Awards	2014	Outstanding Supporting Actress in a Drama Series	Breaking Bad	Won	
Satellite Awards	2014	Best Supporting Actress – Series, Miniseries or Television Film	Breaking Bad	Nominated	
Saturn Awards	2010	Best Actress on Television	Breaking Bad	Nominated	
Saturn Awards	2013	Best Supporting Actress on Television	Breaking Bad	Nominated	
Saturn Awards	2014	Best Actress on Television	Breaking Bad	Nominated	
Screen Actors Guild Awards	2007	Outstanding Performance by an Ensemble in a Drama Series	Deadwood	Nominated	
Screen Actors Guild Awards	2012	Outstanding Performance by an Ensemble in a Drama Series	Breaking Bad	Nominated	
Screen Actors Guild Awards	2013	Outstanding Performance by an Ensemble in a Drama Series	Breaking Bad	Nominated	
Screen Actors Guild Awards	2014	Outstanding Performance by a Female Actor in a Drama Series	Breaking Bad	Nominated	
Screen Actors Guild Awards	2014	Outstanding Performance by an Ensemble in a Drama Series	Breaking Bad	Won	
