= Paul Perri =

American actor

- Born: Paul John Perri; November 6, 1953 (age 72); New Haven, Connecticut, U.S.
- Other name: Paul J. Perri
- Education: Juilliard School (BFA)
- Occupation: Film actor / television actor
- Years active: 1981–present
- Spouse: Michele Miner (wife)
- Children: 2

Paul John Perri (born November 6, 1953) is an American-Canadian film and television actor. Perri is best known for portraying Edwards and Skinless Parker in Hellraiser: Bloodline, Harry Hume from Chaos, and as Dr. Sidney Bloom from Manhunter.

== Background ==
Perri and his wife, Michele Miner are the parents of Giacomo Miner Perri and Justine Miner Perri. Perri is the older brother of James Perri and younger brother of Ralph Perri and Catherine Perri. He was born in New Haven, Connecticut, U.S.A. in 1953. Paul Perri also has extensive theatre credits (USA) including Broadway, Off Broadway, and regional.

== Filmography ==
=== Film ===
Paul Perri film credits
Year	Title	Role
1983	Hit and Run	David Marks
1986	Manhunter	Dr. Sidney Bloom
1990	Delta Force 2: The Colombian Connection	Maj. Bobby Chavez
1992	Memoirs of an Invisible Man	Gomez
1993	Demolition Man	Squad Leader
1995	Without Evidence	Sgt. Unsoeld
1995	Live Nude Girls	Jerome's Friend
1996	Freeway	Cop #1
1996	Hellraiser: Bloodline	Edwards / Skinless Parker
1996	The Funeral	Young Ray
1997	Dead Men Can't Dance	Maj. Shelby
1998	October 22	Police Captain
1999	The Insider	Geologist / FBI Man
2002	Moonlight Mile	Public Defender
2005	Chaos	Harry Hume
2009	Hannah Montana: The Movie	Father on the Pier
2018	Vice	Trent Lott
2023	Knox Goes Away	Dr. Burns

=== Television ===
Paul Perri television credits
Year	Title	Role	Notes
1981	Another World	Joey Perrini	4 episodes
1983	Will There Really Be a Morning?	Luther Adler	TV movie
1985	Badge of the Assassin	Joseph Piagentini	TV movie
1987	The Equalizer	Craig Rose	Episode: "In the Money"
1991	Love, Lies and Murder	Tom Margolin	2 episodes
1992	She Woke Up	Kevin	TV movie
1992	Drexell's Class	Dr. McGuire	1 episode
1992	Those Secrets	Larry	TV movie
1992	Afterburn	Elliot Pace	TV movie
1992	In the Deep Woods	Allen Harkins	TV movie
1993	Desperate Rescue: The Cathy Mahone Story		TV movie
1993	Love, Lies & Lullabies	Dr. Boardman	TV movie
1993	Silk Stalkings	Peter Sheridan	1 episode
1993	Sirens	Bill Withuski	1 episode
1993	Frasier	Bill the Director (uncredited)	1 episode
1994	Baby Brokers	Dr. Carlson	TV movie
1994	ER	Monty	1 episode
1995–2002	NYPD Blue	Jim Stancil / Walter Markham	2 episodes
1996	Babylon 5	Sniper	1 episode
1996	Melrose Place	Andy	3 episodes
1997	Seinfeld	Detective Danner	1 episode
1997–1999	Cracker	Waldron	10 episodes
1998	The Pretender	Frank K. Isaac	1 episode
1999	Ally McBeal	Attorney Serrano	1 episode
2000	The West Wing	Steve Joyce	1 episode
2000	JAG	Dr. Chataway	2 episodes
2001	The Division	IAD Officer	1 episode
2002	Crossing Jordan	Jerry	1 episode
2002	Dark Angel	Senator McKinley	2 episodes
2002	Stargate SG-1	Dr. Woods	1 episode
2002	The Twilight Zone	Cliff Brooks	1 episode
2003	The Guardian	John Peeler	1 episode
2004	Kingdom Hospital	Frank Schweigen	6 episodes
2004	Smallville	John Baker	1 episode
2004	NCIS	Marvin Atwood	1 episode
2004	CSI: NY	Joe Garford	1 episode
2005	Boston Legal	Ronald Emmerich	1 episode
2005	Killer Instinct	Wallace Stevens	1 episode
2006	Battlestar Galactica	Royan Jahee	1 episode
2006	Cold Case	Benson Ockley (1958)	1 episode
2007	Medium	Assemblyman Henry Rykoff	1 episode
2007	Without a Trace	Bob Leard	1 episode
2007	Heroes	Diamond Dealer	1 episode
2007	Grey's Anatomy	Rick's Friend	2 episodes
2007	Side Order of Life	Dr. Frankel	1 episode
2008	Prison Break	Ivan	1 episode
2008	The Andromeda Strain	Dr. Smithson	2 episodes
2009	Three Rivers	Fred	1 episode
2010	Caprica	Judge Maximus	1 episode
