= A Call to Spy =

2019 film by Lydia Dean Pilcher

- Theatrical release poster
- Directed by: Lydia Dean Pilcher
- Written by: Sarah Megan Thomas
- Produced by: Sarah Megan Thomas
- Starring: Sarah Megan Thomas; Stana Katic; Radhika Apte; Linus Roache; Rossif Sutherland
- Cinematography: Robby Baumgartner; Miles Goodall
- Edited by: Paul Tothill
- Music by: Lillie Rebecca McDonough
- Production company: SMT Pictures
- Distributed by: IFC Films
- Release dates: June 21, 2019 (Edinburgh); October 2, 2020 (United States)
- Running time: 124 minutes
- Country: United States
- Language: English
- Box office: $786,484

A Call to Spy (also known as Liberté: A Call to Spy) is a 2019 American spy drama film written and produced by Sarah Megan Thomas and directed by Lydia Dean Pilcher. The title is a stylistic variant of 'a call to arms'. It stars Sarah Megan Thomas, Radhika Apte and Stana Katic.

A Call to Spy had its world premiere on June 21, 2019, at the Edinburgh International Film Festival, and was released in the United States on October 2, 2020, in theaters and on video on demand.

The film received mostly positive reviews. Film critic aggregator Rotten Tomatoes said it "overcomes a surprising lack of tension with an overall engaging tribute to an oft-overlooked group of World War II heroes."

== Plot ==
In the beginning of the Second World War, with Britain becoming desperate, Churchill orders his new spy agency—the Special Operations Executive (SOE)—to recruit and train women as spies. Their daunting mission: conduct sabotage and build a resistance. SOE's "spymistress," Vera Atkins, recruits two unusual candidates: Virginia Hall, an ambitious American with a wooden leg, and Noor Inayat Khan, an Indian Muslim pacifist. Together, these women help to undermine the Nazi regime in France.

== Cast ==
- Sarah Megan Thomas as Virginia Hall
- Stana Katic as Vera Atkins
- Radhika Apte as Noor Inayat Khan
- Linus Roache as Maurice Buckmaster
- Rossif Sutherland as Dr. Chevain
- Samuel Roukin as Christopher
- Andrew Richardson as Alfonse
- Laila Robins as Pirani
- Marc Rissmann as Klaus Barbie
- Mathilde Ollivier as Giselle
- Joe Doyle as Father Robert Alesch
- Alistair Brammer as Leo Marks

== Production ==
Sarah Megan Thomas wrote the original screenplay based on years of research, and to prepare for her role as Virginia Hall, she interviewed Hall's living relatives.

Pilcher has said that she was drawn to this story because she felt a story about the power of multiculturalism was relevant to the current-day rise of nationalism and extremism, and she wanted to feature a story about these women who hadn't received enough attention or acknowledgement in history. To prepare for the role of Noor Inayat Khan, Radhika Apte did a lot of research, which included reading about the historical people as well as watching spy movies and reading classic novels that were relevant to the character.

Filming was done in Philadelphia and Budapest, both of which also provided tax credits to the production.

== Release and reception ==
The film had its world premiere as Liberté: A Call to Spy at the Edinburgh International Film Festival during the commemoration of the 75th anniversary of D-Day, which Thomas believed was a notable choice because historically the agency trained their spies in Scotland.

The film went on to win the Audience Choice Award in record numbers at Whistler Film Festival, where 97% voted for it as their favorite film, "the highest numbers since La La Land took home the prize." The film also won an award from the Alliance of Women Film Journalists. The film was given the Anti-Defamation League Award at the 2020 Santa Barbara International Film Festival with a unanimous vote by the jury. IFC Films then acquired North American distribution rights, with an expected theatrical release in late 2020.

The film has been well reviewed by critics and well received by audiences on the festival circuit. Screen Daily noted that it was "one title to stand out."

On review aggregator website Rotten Tomatoes, A Call to Spy holds an approval score of 73% based on 48 reviews, and an average rating of 6.2. The site's critics consensus reads, "A Call to Spy overcomes a surprising lack of tension with an overall engaging tribute to an oft-overlooked group of World War II heroes"

In the United Kingdom, A Call to Spy was released by Signature Entertainment on October 23, 2020, to positive reviews by top outlets. A review by The Times said: "Inspired by true stories, A Call to Spy is a compelling tale of extraordinary courage and sacrifice.... Each woman left an unmistakable legacy and the film is a tribute to their bravery and ingenuity." The Guardian called the film a "[m]eticulous depiction of female war-time agents" and The Sunday Mirror said it was "[a] powerful and inspiring film about women who left a vital legacy."

Sheila O'Malley of RogerEbert.com gave A Call to Spy 3.5 out of 4 stars: "An excellent historical drama. I was engrossed for every moment of the film's 123-minute running time." Indiewire called the film "A Sturdy Drama about WWII's overlooked female spies. Sarah Megan Thomas is the standout here ... not only taking on the film's meatiest role as real-life spy figure Virginia Hall, but also writing and producing the feature." Cosmopolitan called it one of 31 "spy thrillers that’ll have you on the edge of your damn seat."

In India, Amazon acquired the film as an "Amazon Original", where it received strong reviews. The Times of India said, "Backed by spectacular performances and strong writing, ‘A Call to Spy’ is a realistic and engaging spy-thriller that packs a solid emotional punch."
