= List of Butterbean's Café episodes =

The following is a list of episodes from the series Butterbean's Café.

== Series overview ==
Season	Segments	Episodes	Originally released	
Season	Segments	Episodes	First released	Last released
1	72	39	November 12, 2018	December 29, 2019
2	39	21	January 12, 2020	November 1, 2020

== Episodes ==
=== Season 1 (2018–19) ===
No. overall	No. in season	Title	Directed by	Written by	Storyboard by	Original release date	Prod. code	U.S. viewers (millions)
1	1	"The Grand Opening!"	Jean Herlihy	Jonny Belt & Robert Scull	David Frasquet	November 12, 2018	107	1.28
Butterbean and her friends do whatever they can to make the grand opening of the café a success, while Ms. Marmalady tries to steal their business.
2	2	"Grandma Nana Banana Bread"	Declan Doyle	Lucas Mills	David Frasquet	November 13, 2018	101	0.72
2	2	"Lots and Lots of Lemons!"	Declan Doyle	Tal McThenia	Robert Bandel	November 13, 2018	101	0.72
Dazzle bakes banana bread when her grandmother Nana shows up at the café, but she is missing one ingredient. Ms. Marmalady switches Jasper's order of fruits with lemons.
3	3	"Friendship Pretzels!"	Richard Keane	Laura Kleinbaum	Juan Carlos	November 14, 2018	102	0.70
3	3	"The Wild Tooth Chase"	Declan Doyle	Laura Kleinbaum	Robert Bandel	November 14, 2018	102	0.70
Poppy feels left out when Dazzle gives Butterbean a friendship necklace. Cricket is given a box by Butterbean to keep her tooth safe, and said box soon goes missing.
4	4	"Dazzle's Cake-tastrophe!"	Richard Keane	Dustin Ferrer	Akis Dimitrakopoulos	November 15, 2018	104	0.68
4	4	"Cricket's First Menu!"	Declan Doyle	Dustin Ferrer	Karim Gouyette	November 15, 2018	104	0.68
Dazzle is in charge of the café while preparing a cake. The ketchup used for Cricket's menu gets stolen.
5	5	"The Sweetest Ride"	Richard Keane	Jonny Belt & Robert Scull	Akis Dimitrakopoulos	November 16, 2018	105	0.84
5	5	"A Grilled Cheese for the Big Cheese!"	Declan Doyle	Jonny Belt & Robert Scull	Akis Dimitrakopoulos	November 16, 2018	105	0.84
Mr. Brookwrench turns Butterbean's delivery truck into a mobile café. Butterbean must bring lunch to the president, after her limousine breaks down. Special Guest Star: Carla Hall as Madame President
6	6	"Wedding Cake Switcheroo"	Richard Keane	Laura Kleinbaum	Kinjo Estioko	November 19, 2018	106	0.80
6	6	"Fairy Berry Parfait!"	Declan Doyle	Laura Kleinbaum	Marco Piersma	November 19, 2018	106	0.80
Ms. Marmalady switches her wedding cake with Butterbean's own one. Ms. Marmalady snaps up all the yogurt Butterbean needs for her Fairy Berry Parfait in an attempt to ruin their book party.
7	7	"Rainbow Noodle Soup"	Richard Keane	Lucas Mills	Karim Gouyette	November 20, 2018	108	0.90
7	7	"Pizza Party!"	Richard Keane	Tal McThenia	Karim Gouyette	November 20, 2018	108	0.90
Butterbean gets a cold, therefore the crew try to run the café without her. During a pizza party, the crew decides on what toppings they should use.
8	8	"Fairy Happy Thanksgiving!"	Richard Keane	Laura Kleinbaum	Akis Dimitrakopoulos	November 21, 2018	130	1.07
8	8	"Cricket's the Boss!"	Rob Byrne	Laura Kleinbaum	Akis Dimitrakopoulos	November 21, 2018	130	1.07
Butterbean and her friends try to explain to Ms. Marmalady what Thanksgiving is all about. Cricket opens a lemonade stand, later realizing that being a boss isn't as easy as expected.
9	9	"The Starlight Cupcake Surprise!"	Richard Keane	Lucas Mills	Jason Parker	November 26, 2018	109	0.81
9	9	"Summer Slushies!"	Declan Doyle	Jonny Belt & Robert Scull	Kinjo Estioko	November 27, 2018	109	0.67
Unfrosted cupcakes are accidentally delivered by a Brookie. The café's freezer has broken down, so Butterbean borrows Ms. Marmalady's, who uses it without help from anyone.
10	10	"Switchin' in the Kitchen!"	Richard Keane	Lucas Mills and Cathi Turow	Juan Carlos	November 28, 2018	111	0.59
10	10	"The Breadstick Bicycle!"	Declan Doyle	Lucas Mills and Cathi Turow	Karim Gouyette	November 29, 2018	111	0.75
Dazzle and Poppy each think that the other's job is easier, so they decide to switch jobs to see whose job is easier and better. Cricket is called on to save the day when the Sweet Ride cannot make any deliveries.
11	11	"Monkey Cookie Escape!"	Richard Keane	Cindy Morrow	Karim Gouyette	November 30, 2018	113	0.75
11	11	"The New Neighbors!"	Declan Doyle	Cindy Morrow	Darren Nesbitt	November 30, 2018	113	0.75
A mishap accidentally causes some monkey cookies to come alive, so it's up to Butterbean and friends to end the chaos. The crew leaves a welcome basket for their new neighbors, not knowing that Ms. Marmalady will take their welcome.
12	12	"The Sugar Plum Fairy!"	Richard Keane and Rob Bryne	Jonny Belt & Robert Scull and Cindy Morrow	David Frasquet and Karim Gouyette	December 14, 2018	120	0.76
It is time for the holidays in Puddlebrook, but after Butterbean loses the Sugar Plum Fairy cake, Cricket panics that the Sugar Plum Fairy will not come. Special Guest Star: Giada De Laurentiis as Ms. Peartree/Sugar Plum Fairy
13	13	"Butterbean Babysits!"	Richard Keane	Scott Gray	Kinjo Estioko	January 14, 2019	112	0.66
13	13	"Fairy Cozy Cocoa!"	Declan Doyle	Scott Gray	Jason Parker	January 15, 2019	112	0.68
Butterbean babysits a rabbit toddler for the day. As it is windy in Puddlebrook and the bean team are serving hot cocoa with marshmallows to not only warm their customers but also to attract them.
14	14	"Where's Cookie?"	Richard Keane	Mario López-Cordero	Akis Dimitrakopouls	January 16, 2019	115	0.68
14	14	"Jasper Learns to Bake!"	Declan Doyle	Mario López-Cordero	Robin French	January 17, 2019	115	0.69
Cricket is so excited to have a new kitten, who she calls Cookie, that she doesn't only get carried away, but overwhelms it. This eventually results in it escaping at an opportune time. Jasper offers for help in the kitchen with the day's special, cinnamon buns. When he tries to impress Poppy by adding a whole bowl of yeast to his cinnamon bun mixture in order to make it bigger and better, it enlarges out of control.
15	15	"Surprise Cake!"	Declan Doyle and Damien O'Connor	Caitlin Hodson	Kinjo Estioko	February 4, 2019	116	0.67
15	15	"Tic Tac Tomato!"	Richard Keane	Caitlin Hodson	Jason Parker	February 5, 2019	116	0.64
Cricket wants to surprise Poppy with a cake, but must finish it before Poppy returns from running errands. Cricket loses a game at the cafe's Game Day.
16	16	"A Fairy Sneezy Day!"	Rob Byrne and Richard Keane	Lucas Mills	Marco Piersma	February 6, 2019	117	0.58
16	16	"The Queen of Quiche!"	Declan Doyle and Damien O'Connor	Lucas Mills	David Frasquet	February 7, 2019	117	0.66
Poppy is allergic to something that everyone thinks it's Cookie. Butterbean and Ms. Marmalady both make quiche for the mayor, but only one will be crowned the Queen of Quiche.
17	17	"Café Ballet"	Rob Byrne and Richard Keane	Laura Kleinbaum	Brant Moon	March 25, 2019	118	0.59
17	17	"Cricket Goes Camping!"	Declan Doyle and Damien O'Connor	Laura Kleinbaum	Juan Carlos	March 26, 2019	118	0.57
Poppy's duties at the café leave her no time to practice for ballet tryouts. When Cricket is nervous about her first camping trip, Butterbean helps her overcome her fear.
18	18	"Fluttercakes!"	Richard Keane and Alan Moran	Samantha Berger	David Stephan	March 27, 2019	103	0.57
18	18	"The Perfect Picnic!"	Declan Doyle	Samantha Berger	Jason Parker	March 28, 2019 (Note: This episode was released early on iTunes on October 15, 2018.)	103	0.45
Fed up with the garbageman arriving at Butterbean's café, Ms. Marmalady competes with her at a Fluttercake-making contest. Cricket’s plans for a perfect picnic with the Puddle Scouts are in ruins by ants secretly caused by Ms. Marmalady, and she must use her scout skills to save the day.
19	19	"Spring Has Sprung!"	Declan Doyle	Laura Kleinbaum	Akis Dimitrakopoulos	April 8, 2019	110	0.42
19	19	"Dazzle Loves to Sing!"	Richard Keane	Laura Kleinbaum	Marco Piersma	April 9, 2019	110	0.53
Butterbean makes a cake to look just like spring flowers. Dazzle is a great singer, but her constant singing gets distracting.
20	20	"Upside-Down Frown Cake!"	Rob Byrne	Mario López-Cordero	Brant Moon	April 10, 2019	125B	0.45
20	20	"The Great Egg Hunt!"	Rob Byrne	Josh Haber	Andy Kelly	April 11, 2019	125A	0.52
Ms. Marmalady is having a bad day, so Spork and Spatch try to find a way to cheer her up. With the help of Butterbean, they make a cherry pineapple cake as a surprise for Mrs. Marmalady. But Mrs. Marmalady begins to feel lonely and decides to leave her café for good. When Spork and Spatch steal Butterbean's Easter eggs, Cricket goes on a hunt to get them back.
21	21	"The Messy Barbecue!"	Richard Keane	Kerri Grant	Gavin Flutterton and Darren Nesbitt	May 13, 2019	119	0.53
21	21	"Poppy's Lost Cookbook!"	Alan Moran	Kerri Grant	Akis Dimitrakopoulos	May 14, 2019	119	0.47
Cricket makes special shirts for the cafe's barbecue, but the crew soils them. Poppy's recipes may be in jeopardy when she accidentally donates her cookbook by mistake and Ms. Marmalady finds it.
22	22	"Flutter Butter!"	Alan Moran and Richard Keane	Mario López-Cordero	Marco Piesma	May 15, 2019	121	0.45
22	22	"Cricket Delivers!"	Rob Byrne	Mario López-Cordero	Robin French	May 16, 2019	121	0.51
Ms. Marmalady sends Spork and Spatch to swap her supply of peanut butter with Butterbean's own special supply of Flutter Butter, an ingredient used for Butterbean’s meal for two similar monkey kids. Cricket helps Jasper make deliveries, but she keeps making mistakes.
23	23	"Bad Luck Jasper!"	Alan Moran and Richard Keane	Caitlin Hodson	Juan Carlos	June 3, 2019	122	0.50
23	23	"Green Machine to the Rescue!"	Rob Byrne	Caitlin Hodson	Akis Dimitrakopoulos	June 4, 2019	122	0.56
A bad day gives Jasper a hard time trying to get rid of his bad luck, much to the point where he believes it will ruin his chance of winning the Green Machine, a green ATV, in a contest. Jasper is tasked of delivering refreshments to a Frog Scout event at the park, and is excited to do it on the Green Machine, but he runs into mishaps along the way.
24	24	"Cricket's Forever Friend"	Richard Keane	Lucas Mills	David Frasquet	June 5, 2019	123	0.56
24	24	"Dazzle's Tea-riffic Teapot!"	Rob Byrne	Lucas Mills	Karim Gouyette	June 6, 2019	123	0.55
Cricket’s friend, Dottie, is moving away. They decide to spend a special last day together before Dottie moves away, but Cricket has an argument with Dottie while teaching her how to make chocolate strawberry ladybugs. Dottie sadly flees the café, and Cricket worries she has missed her chance to say goodbye. When Dazzle shows her own delicate teapot set to Butterbean and the café, Cricket gets ahold of the tea set and has her own imaginary tea party with it. But Cricket worries she has broken it and tries to hide and fix it.
25	25	"Cricket's Treasure Hunt"	Shane Collins and Alan Moran	Josh Haber	Brant Moon	July 15, 2019	124	0.54
25	25	"The Puddlebrook Gold Rush!"	Rob Byrne	Jennifer Beales, Laura Kleinbaum, and Robert Scull	Robin French	July 16, 2019	124	0.57
Cricket goes on a treasure hunt for a mysterious red fruit. A rumor has everyone believing if gold treasure is buried at Butterbean's Café.
26	26	"The Missing Veggies!"	Seamus O'Toole	Cindy Morrow	Juan Carlos	July 17, 2019	126	0.52
26	26	"Cricket the Flower Girl!"	Shane Collins and Alan Moran	Cindy Morrow	David Frasquet	July 18, 2019	126	0.46
When all of Poppy’s vegetables disappear from her garden, the Bean Team thinks that Ms. Marmalady is responsible. Cricket accidentally stains her dress before a wedding.
27	27	"The Hawaiian Luau!"	Richard Keane	Mario López-Cordero	Marco Piersma	July 29, 2019	127	0.54
27	27	"Kitty-sitting!"	Richard Keane	Laura Kleinbaum	Gavin Fullerton	July 29, 2019	127	0.54
Dazzle accidentally locks smoothies inside the Sweet Ride and can't find the key. Jasper thinks pet-sitting Cookie will be a piece of cake, but things go wrong when she gets lost.
28	28	"The Takeout Window!"	Richard Keane	Lucas Mills	Andy Kelly	July 30, 2019	129	0.60
28	28	"Poppy's Fortune!"	Shane Collins and Alan Moran	Lucas Mills	David Frasquet	July 30, 2019	129	0.60
When Spork and Spatch accidentally glue the fairies inside the cafe, the Bean Team can't get their pie orders out. Poppy's fortune cookie says she will have a day full of mistakes.
29	29	"Poppy's Cooking Class!"	Richard Keane	Caitlin Hodson	Brant Moon	July 31, 2019	131	0.63
29	29	"A Fairy Peachy Day!"	Shane Collins and Alan Moran	Caitlin Hodson	David Frasquet	July 31, 2019	131	0.63
Poppy agrees to work at Marmalady's forever if she cannot teach Spork and Spatch how to cook. Dazzle becomes jealous when Grandma Nana spends time with Dazzle's friends.
30	30	"The Towering Tower of Crepes!"	Rob Byrne, Shane Collins and Alan Moran	Jessie Keyt	Akis Dimitrakopoulos and Karim Gouyette	August 1, 2019	128	0.51
Jasper wants to assist Butterbean in cooking for her idol, chef Belle Legume; Jasper also attempts to master the spatula in time to help flip and make the Towering Tower of Crepes. Special Guest: Padma Lakshmi as Chef Belle Legume
31	31	"Boss for the Day!"	Richard Keane	Lucas Mills	Andy Kely	August 25, 2019	136	0.34
31	31	"Cricket's Get Well Wagon!"	Shane Collins	Caitlin Hodson and Lucas Mills	Akis Dimitrakopoulos	August 25, 2019	136	0.34
Ms. Marmalady comes up with a plan to become the boss of Butterbean's Cafe. Everyone in Puddlebrook has come down with the sniffles, even Jasper. Note: Beginning with this episode, episodes now air on the Nick Jr. channel.
32	32	"No Way, Soufflé!"	Rob Byrne and Richard Keane	Lucas Mills and Mikayla Morin	Robin French	September 1, 2019	137	0.32
32	32	"Cinnamon the Elephant!"	Shane Collins	Lucas Mills and Mikayla Morin	David Frasquet	September 1, 2019	137	0.32
Cricket's noisy antics constantly ruin the soufflé meant for the Brookbinders' wedding anniversary. A shy new girl named Skylar is afraid to make friends, and Cricket has to help her.
33	33	"The Fairy Bean Adventure!"	Damien O'Connor	Jonny Belt & Robert Scull	Karim Gouyette	September 8, 2019	134	0.43
When Butterbean runs out of magic fairy beans, the fairies go on an adventure to find more; Ms. Marmalady hears about their quest and wants to get the beans for herself.
34	34	"A Kitty for Marmalady's!"	Richard Keane	Laura Kleinbaum	Andy Kelly	September 22, 2019	132	0.37
34	34	"Slumber Party!"	Shane Collins & Alan Moran	Jennifer Beales, Caitlin Hodson and Robert Scull	Karim Gouyette	September 22, 2019	132	0.37
A mischievous cat causes trouble in the café, but the team thinks it's Cookie. Cricket is upset when her friends cannot come to her first slumber party.
35	35	"A Bean for Halloween!"	Jean Herlihy and Declan Doyle	Jonny Belt & Robert Scull	David Frasquest and Karim Gouyette	October 6, 2019	114	0.33
The Bean Team tries to prep for their big party, but things keep happening around the café; Cricket believes she sees a ghost until she realizes it is actually a winged cat. Special Guest: Rachael Ray as Charlotte
36	36	"The Marmalady Sisters!"	Richard Keane	Laura Kleinbaum	Robin French	November 3, 2019	138	0.44
36	36	"Butterbean's Is Closing!"	Rob Bryne	Laura Kleinbaum	Akis Dimitrakopoulos	November 3, 2019	138	0.44
When Ms. Marmalady and her sister enter the Siblings Day Baking Contest, they argue over everything. Cricket overhears Butterbean mention that she is closing the café.
37	37	"Oopsie Doodle!"	Damien O'Connor	Jonny Belt & Robert Scull and Caitlin Hodson	Karim Gouyette	November 24, 2019	140	0.40
When Ms. Marmalady lets the mischievous Oopsie Doodle loose in Butterbean's Café, he starts causing all sorts of mishaps. Special Guest: Wallace Shawn as Oopsie Doodle
38	38	"The Gingerbread Man!"	Richard Keane	Stacey Greenberger	Marco Piersma	December 8, 2019	133	0.39
38	38	"Copykitties!"	Seamus O'Toole	Stacey Greenberger	Robin French	December 8, 2019	133	0.39
Ms. Marmalady's mishap causes a giant gingerbread man to run wild and the Bean Team tries to catch him before he wrecks their café. Dottie keeps mimicking Cricket on their playdate.
39	39	"The Big Tomato!"	Shane Collins	Caitlin Hodson	David Frasquet	December 29, 2019	139	0.33
39	39	"Tough Customers!"	Richard Keane	Caitlin Hodson	Robin French	December 29, 2019	139	0.33
Chef Carlo is impressed by Poppy's huge homegrown tomato. The Bean Team can't get an order right for one of their customers.

=== Season 2 (2020) ===
No. overall	No. in season	Title	Directed by	Written by	Original release date	Prod. code	U.S. viewers (millions)
40	1	"Stella Sprinkles!"	Brian O'Brien	Caitlin Hodson	January 12, 2020	201	0.35
40	1	"Fairy Fancy!"	Brian O'Brien	Michael Kaufman	January 12, 2020	201	0.35
Cricket invites a popular cupcake designer named Stella Sprinkles to the café where they and some friends would decorate some cupcakes. A fancy party is arranged, and Butterbean's crew receives invitations, except Jasper, whose letter gets lost. Note: This is the first episode with the new animation style and to feature the reanimated theme song.
41	2	"EZ-PZ!"	Brian O'Brien	Caitlin Hodson	February 2, 2020	202	0.29
41	2	"The Splat Spot!"	Brian O'Brien	Elizabeth Keyishian	February 2, 2020	202	0.29
Dazzle thinks her new robot called EZ-PZ will make everyone's jobs easy, however, it sparks chaos in the kitchen. When Ms. Marmalady impersonated herself as Clara Cleanspot and closes Butterbean's Cafe, the team must stop her or they will lose the Hops family for the Hopses' family dinner.
42	3	"A Recipe for Friendship!"	Brian O'Brien	Michael Kaufman	February 23, 2020	203	0.36
42	3	"Team Captain Cricket!"	Brian O'Brien	Mario López Cordero	February 23, 2020	203	0.36
43	4	"Rebel Without a Whisk!"	Brian O'Brien	Caitlin Hodson and Elizabeth Keyishian	March 1, 2020	204	0.49
43	4	"Key Slime Bars!"	Brian O'Brien	Stacey Greenberger	March 1, 2020	204	0.49
Poppy's cousin Rebel visits the café, and starts playing with Butterbean's whisk which becomes a problem when Butterbean needs it. Ms. Marmalady gives Butterbean a mini Flower-Scope, which is secretly a spy camera so she could replicate everything Butterbean produces, and therefore attract customers.
44	5	"Cutie Pie's Pizza Pies!"	Brian O'Brien	Caitlin Hodson	March 15, 2020	205	0.31
Cricket loves playing with Cutie Pie, an old pizza delivery truck that magically comes alive, until Ms. Marmalady buys Cutie Pie and threatens to send her own vehicle to the junkyard.
45	6	"Cherry Delicious!"	Brian O'Brien	Stacey Greenberger	March 22, 2020	206	0.37
45	6	"Movie Night!"	Brian O'Brien	Mario López Cordero	March 22, 2020	206	0.37
46	7	"The April Fools' Joke!"	Shane Collins	Mario López-Cordero	March 29, 2020	135	0.21
46	7	"Dazzle's Birthday Surprise!"	Rob Byrne	Mario López-Cordero	March 29, 2020	135	0.21
Dazzle makes a popping doughnut to prank Poppy. Special Guest: Alton Brown as Principal Stoneybrook Dazzle thinks that everyone has forgotten her birthday, but her friends prove her wrong.
47	8	"Perfectly Perfect Pancakes!"	Brian O'Brien	Meryl Schumacker	April 26, 2020	207	0.40
47	8	"The Delivery Game"	Brian O'Brien	Sara Farber	April 26, 2020	207	0.40
48	9	"Runaway Rooster"	Brian O'Brien	Joon Chung	May 3, 2020	208	0.32
48	9	"Cookie Master"	Brian O'Brien	Rosie Dupont	May 3, 2020	208	0.32
Farmer Carly's rooster, Lou, causes problems in the cafe. Poppy promises Zara and her family that she will make a cookie she has never heard of, however, she has never heard of "Sandy Dandies" before and she must figure out this unnamed cookie recipe.
49	10	"I Love Rockin' Rolls!"	Brian O'Brien	Jennifer Hamburg	May 10, 2020	209	0.36
49	10	"A Baby at Marmalady's"	Brian O'Brien	Jennifer Hamburg	May 10, 2020	209	0.36
Special Guest Star: Jordan Fisher as Zane Grey
50	11	"The Legend of the Shadow Bean"	Brian O'Brien	Caitlin Hodson	May 17, 2020	210	0.39
When a Shadow Bean turns the day into nighttime and makes all the citizens of Puddlebrook fall fast asleep, they must return it to the Pit of Shadows in the Cave of the Magical Bad Beans and get rid of it once and it for all. But, they must be careful and avoid the Bean Bats who lived there because if the Shadow Bean falls right into a Bean Bat's hand, darkness will spread across Puddlebrook forever, all the time. Meanwhile, some Bean Bats and Queen Batilda take over Puddlebrook with the help of Ms. Marmalady, who took some Bad Beans so she can sabotage Butterbean's Cafe; the Bean Team must find a way to start the day before it remains darkness forever. Special Guest Star: Maria Bamford as Queen Batilda
51	12	"Ice Cream Funday!"	Brian O'Brien	Meryl Schumacker	June 21, 2020	211	N/A
51	12	"Fairy Food Fails!"	Brian O'Brien	Meryl Schumacker	June 21, 2020	211	N/A
Ms. Marmalady uses a no-sharing bean on Butterbean's giant ice cream sundae. Cricket is thrilled to be cafe photographer for the day, but there is more to the job than she thought.
52	13	"Race to the Fairy Finish"	Brian O'Brien	Susan Kim	June 28, 2020	212	0.32
52	13	"Busy, Busy Butterbean!"	Brian O'Brien	Caitlin Hodson	June 28, 2020	212	0.32
Butterbean must deliver a very special dessert for a wedding. Butterbean's friends want to surprise her with a beach day on the roof.
53	14	"Cutie Pie's Checkup"	Brian O'Brien	Susan Kim	July 26, 2020	213	0.32
53	14	"Puddle Scout Cookies"	Brian O'Brien	Jill Cozza-Turner	July 26, 2020	213	0.32
54	15	"Sleepy Bean"	Brian O'Brien	Monique D. Hall	August 2, 2020	214	0.32
54	15	"Oldies But Smoothies"	Brian O'Brien	Monique D. Hall	August 2, 2020	214	0.32
Ms. Marmalady "sleepy beans" the Bean Team before Cricket's Super Moon Party.
55	16	"Fairy Pop"	Brian O'Brien	Mario López-Cordero	September 13, 2020	215	0.42
56	17	"Firefighter Jasper"	Brian O'Brien	Mario López-Cordero	September 20, 2020	216	0.41
56	17	"Cookie to the Rescue!"	Brian O'Brien	Jill Cozza-Turner	September 20, 2020	216	0.41
57	18	"Happy Birthday, Cricket!"	Brian O'Brien	Abby Sher	September 27, 2020	218	0.37
57	18	"Friendly Frank!"	Brian O'Brien	Marty Johnson	September 27, 2020	218	0.37
58	19	"Cricket's First Fairy Finish"	Brian O'Brien	Jehan Madhani	October 4, 2020	217	0.34
58	19	"Tricky Sticky Buns"	Brian O'Brien	Meryl Schumacker	October 4, 2020	217	0.34
59	20	"The Big Birthday Hiccup!"	Brian O'Brien	Caitlin Hodson	October 18, 2020	219	0.37
59	20	"Skater 'Taters!"	Brian O'Brien	Jehan Medhani	October 18, 2020	219	0.37
60	21	"The Glowberry Fairy!"	Brian O'Brien	Rosie Dupont	November 1, 2020	220	0.32
60	21	"Hello, Marma Team!"	Brian O'Brien	Leah Gotscik	November 1, 2020	220	0.32
Cricket believes in the Glowberry Fairy in her fairy tale book, but the rest of the Bean Team doubts the truth of the fairy tale. When Ms. Marmalady uses Marma-Hats to turn the Bean Team into the Marma Team so they can work with Spork and Spatch, Butterbean must save the day before the customers realized that the rest of the Bean Team parted ways.
