= Cool Effect =

American nonprofit organization

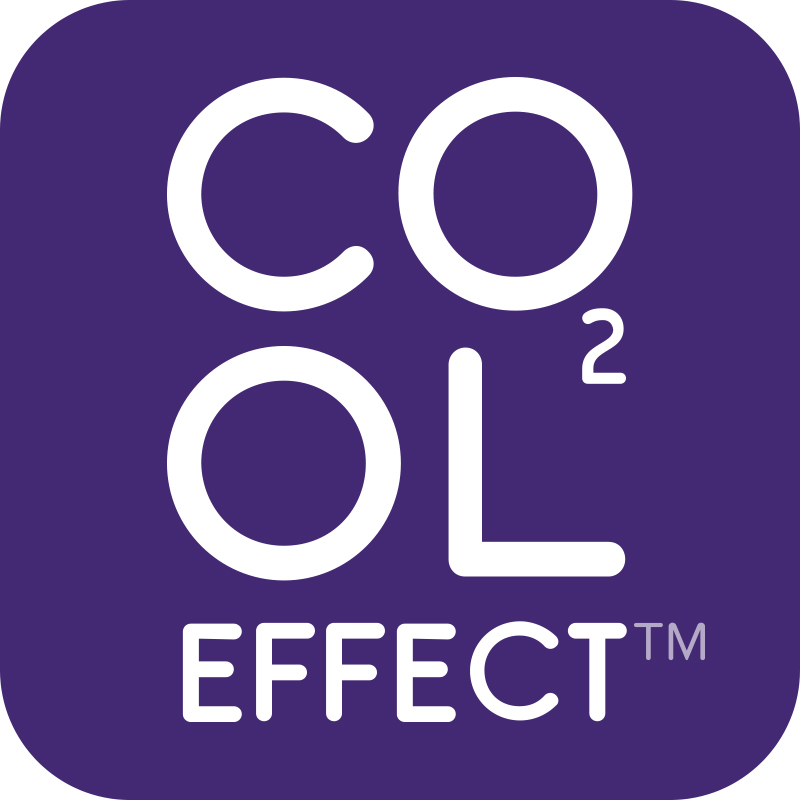
- Formation: 2016; 10 years ago Kentfield, California
- Type: Social enterprise
- Purpose: Environmentalism
- Headquarters: Greenbrae, California
- Founders: Richard and Dee Lawrence
- Staff: 7
- Website: cooleffect.org

Cool Effect is a crowdfunding platform that provides individuals the opportunity to support carbon emissions reductions by funding carbon-reducing projects around the world. Cool Effect is a registered 501(c)(3) nonprofit organization headquartered in Greenbrae, California.

== Projects ==
The platform has compiled a portfolio of projects that support carbon emissions reductions, referred to as the “Coollection”, which is available on its website for individuals to fund. One-time donations or monthly subscription models are available, and individuals also can choose to donate to specific projects.

As of 2020, Cool Effect financed projects in the following three categories:

- Methane capturing and biogas digesters
- Efficient cookstoves
- Protecting ecosystems

Global Offset Research is a subsidiary company of Cool Effect that includes a team of scientists and financial analysts who are responsible for vetting the carbon-reducing projects. The verification process includes a financial analysis that assesses the initial and long-term feasibility of the project, as well as the amount of funds that reach the project beneficiary, and a guarantee of “Absolute Additionality”, as the scientists perform their own verification, in addition to existing industry standard verification.

Cool Effect additionally provides the ability to download all of the documentation that their team of scientists have compiled prior to contributing, allowing individuals to obtain detailed information about the project and the findings from the vetting process.

== Partnerships ==
Cool Effect has created partnerships with GreenFaith, Natural Resources Defense Council, Presidio Graduate School, Redford Center, Wildlife Conservation Society, Salesforce.com, and Yale School of Public Health. In addition to these organizations, it also works closely with actress Alysia Reiner.

== See also ==
Carbon offset
