= Michael Francke =

American judge (1946–1989)

James Michael Francke
- Michael Francke

Director of the Oregon Department of Corrections
- In office May 1987 – January 17, 1989
- Governor: Neil Goldschmidt

Director of the New Mexico Corrections Department
- In office 1983 – May 1987
- Succeeded by: Lane McCotter

Personal details
- Born: October 2, 1946 Kansas City, Missouri, U.S.
- Died: January 17, 1989 (aged 42) Salem, Oregon, U.S.
- Cause of death: Homicide by stabbing
- Education: New Mexico Highlands University (BA); University of Virginia (JD)
- Occupation: Corrections Director

Military service
- Branch/service: United States Navy

James Michael Francke (/ˈfræŋki/; October 2, 1946 – January 17, 1989) was an American judge from New Mexico and director of the state's Corrections Department, the governmental bureau which manages prisons, inmates, and parolees. He was later appointed by then-Oregon governor Neil Goldschmidt to oversee a plan to double the state's inmate capacity as director of Oregon's Department of Corrections. On January 18, 1989, his body was discovered outside the department's office building in Salem; an autopsy determined he had been murdered the night before. A local petty criminal was eventually tried and convicted for the crime, and sentenced to life in prison without parole. However, the convicted killer maintains his innocence, and several conspiracy theories have been advocated, claiming that the killing was a murder for hire conducted by corrupt state prison officials threatened by an investigation Francke was conducting into prison mismanagement. In 2019, the man convicted for the murder of Francke was released from prison after his murder conviction was thrown out by a federal magistrate in Portland, who ruled he did not receive a fair trial; four years later, he was given a full release when his indictment by the county was dismissed with prejudice and his murder conviction was expunged from the record.

A 1995 film Without Evidence, written by Gil Dennis and Phil Stanford, an Oregon columnist who has investigated the case extensively, was based on the Francke murder and subsequent investigations by Kevin Francke, Michael's brother.

The Association of State Correctional Administrators annually awards the Michael Francke Award to the top corrections administrator in the United States.

== Early life and education ==
Francke, a native of Kansas City, Missouri, attended New Mexico Highlands University on a football scholarship, where he graduated with a Bachelor of Arts degree in a combined major of political science, economics, German, and French. He then attended the University of Virginia Law School on a scholastic scholarship, graduating with a Juris Doctor degree in 1971, and was subsequently admitted to the Virginia bar. For the next three years, he served as a judge advocate general in the United States Navy, at Long Beach Naval Station.

== Career ==
In 1975, he was admitted to the bar in New Mexico, and worked as an assistant attorney general and counsel to the New Mexico Corrections Department. He served in this capacity until 1980, when he became a judge for the First District Court in Santa Fe. He served as a judge for three years, and in 1983 became the director of the New Mexico Department of Corrections.

In May 1987, Oregon governor Neil Goldschmidt hired Francke to fill the corresponding position in Oregon. He was hired with a remit to address problems in the state's Department of Corrections (ODOC). During his tenure, he had been criticized by some in the Oregon Legislature for cost overruns and delays in a state prison construction program.

== Murder ==
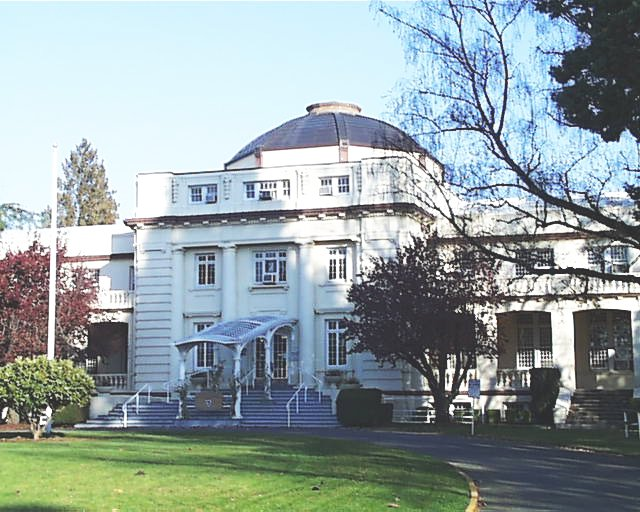
The Dome Building

Early on the morning of January 18, 1989, a security guard found Francke's body lying in a pool of blood on the floor of the North Portico of the Dome Building (the headquarters office of ODOC, not to be confused with the Oregon State Capitol building) in Salem. An autopsy revealed the cause of death to be a stab wound to the heart suffered the night before, and also revealed other "defensive wounds". Francke was last seen alive by Dome Building staff at approximately 6:45 p.m. on January 17. Two senior staff leaving the Dome Building approximately 40 minutes later discovered his car parked in its designated spot outside the front entryway with the driver's door open. No obvious signs of forced entry on the vehicle were observed. The staffers locked and closed the car door, and returned to the Dome Building where they made numerous phone calls to other senior staffers in an effort to determine Francke's whereabouts, all to no avail. Security was notified at the nearby Communications Center, and the staffers left the Dome Building at approximately 8:05 p.m. Two other senior staffers, Richard Peterson, head of Institutions, and David Caulley, head of Planning and Budget, arrived at approximately 8:35 p.m. and conducted what they described as a meticulous search of the Dome Building, but found nothing amiss. They returned to their homes on the presumption that Francke was at a private dinner engagement. Police were never notified of the situation until the guard discovered the body nearly four hours later.

Given the nature of Francke's work, the possibility that the murder was a "hit" was immediately considered. An investigation commenced, and fifteen months later, Frank Gable, a small-time methamphetamine dealer, was charged with the crime. A local teen runaway named Jodie Swearingen testified before a grand jury that she had witnessed the murder; police reports indicate that she had identified Gable as the perpetrator. She later recanted her testimony, instead claiming that another Salem drug dealer, Timothy Natividad, was the murderer.

At the trial, the state produced several witnesses (all of whom were criminal associates of Gable) who claimed that Gable confessed the crime to them after the fact. Swearingen was called to testify by the prosecution at the trial. No physical evidence was produced; however the prosecution was allowed to introduce as evidence a knife (purchased by investigators) which matched Francke's wounds; Gable's ex-wife testified that she had given Gable a similar knife.

On June 27, 1991, Gable was convicted of six counts of aggravated murder and one count of murder. He was sentenced to life in prison without possibility of parole. Gable continues to maintain his innocence. In October 2014, the Federal Public Defender's Office sought to reopen the case on appeal.

On April 18, 2019, U.S. Magistrate Judge John Acosta ruled that Frank Gable must be retried or released within 90 days, noting among other trial issues that many witnesses presented have since recanted, and that their testimony was obtained via coercive interrogation tactics and polygraph examinations. One particular action was the exclusion of the fact that another man had repeatedly confessed to the murder of Francke in John Crouse, a Salem resident and parolee at the time. Crouse had told law enforcement officers and members of his own family that he stabbed Francke when caught trying to burglarize Francke's car. While Crouse (no longer living by the time of the 2019 decision) had recanted his confession, Acosta found that the exclusion of Crouse's confession during the original trial violated Gable's due process rights. On June 28, 2019, Gable was released from prison. Under federal supervision, he eventually moved to Kansas and started work for a concrete contractor. In May 2023, Gable was granted a full release, with his indictment being dismissed with prejudice that meant the county would be barred from re-arresting or re-indicting him for the murder, with the conviction being expunged from his record.

On April 14, 2025, Oregon House Majority Leader Ben Bowman and Minority Leader Christine Drazan sent a letter to FBI director Kash Patel, asking the FBI to investigate the murder.

== Conspiracy theories ==
Former state treasurer Jim Hill does not accept the official verdict, believing either that Gable is altogether innocent of the crime, or that he, or another perpetrator was a hired hit man rather than a chance car burglar.

The Francke family, led by Francke's brother Kevin Francke, have also publicly expressed doubts about the official conclusions. Kevin Francke has claimed that prior to his death, Michael Francke warned him of a threat on his life, and told him that he had discovered a network of corruption in the department.

There are several theories as to who may have been the killer or killers, and who may have ordered a "hit" on Francke. Most alternate theories of the case propose Timothy Natividad (who was killed two weeks after the Francke murder) as the person who stabbed Francke. Theories as to who may have been behind the killing focus on two men high in the corrections hierarchy. One individual who has been named is Hoyt Cupp, the former warden of the Oregon State Penitentiary; in 2007, a convicted felon gave a series of interviews to Willamette Week in which he claimed that he witnessed Cupp and another (unnamed) corrections official pay Natividad $20,000; and that Natividad later informed him it was payment for killing Francke. Cupp died of cancer in 1990.

Another individual who has been named is Scott McAlister, who had been the assistant attorney general for the state of Oregon until he resigned shortly before Francke's death. McAlister subsequently became Inspector General of the Utah corrections department. An ex-girlfriend of McAlister told the Portland Tribune that McAlister had been in possession of internal police documents concerning the murder that he no longer had had any official reason to possess, and that she had overheard McAlister describe the killing as a "botched hit that was supposed to look like a suicide".

The McAlister theory gained credence in October 1991, when one of the private investigators who had worked on the Gable defense team, H. Wayne Holm, was killed by a Multnomah County Sheriff's deputy, Brian Martinek (now an assistant chief of the Portland Police Bureau), allegedly during a "reverse sting" drug operation. Holm, who had been a former inmate in the Oregon Correction system during the early 1980s, had assisted numerous other inmates with parole hearing presentations, and had known Scott McAlister, who represented the Parole and Probation Board during those hearings. Holm had offered the theory that the primary motivation for Francke's murder was that he had discovered a plot by McAlister to "sell" paroles to inmates. Adding to the mix was the fact that the person who had been appointed to fill Francke's office after his death in 1997 had been Fred Pierce, the longtime Sheriff of Multnomah County, and the man who had originally hired Martinek.

Much speculation has centered on a mysterious "man in the pinstriped suit", an unknown individual who was spotted by a corrections employee inside the corrections Dome Building, 90 minutes after closing time. The individual has never been identified. Another Dome Building employee, who worked as a Parole Board clerk, has stated the man in the pinstriped suit also matches the description she gave to police as the man who arrived at the Dome Building the day of the murder to repair the copy machine late in the afternoon, and was granted unprecedented access to remain in the building after hours to complete the repairs. The repairs were never completed, the machine was left in pieces, and neither the man in the pinstriped suit or Dennis Plante, the man who testified he was the copy machine repairman (but whom the Parole Board clerk states was not the man who worked on the copier), returned to complete the repairs, nor was any record of the service call found in the copier 'repair log' after the murder. Whether or not the individual has any relation to the killing is unknown, the individual does not resemble Gable.

Dale Penn, who oversaw Gable's prosecution while serving as Marion County district attorney, stated in 2007 that he had "every confidence that Frank Gable [was] guilty and that this story (the Willamette Week article) [was] not true".

== Press coverage ==
The case has become somewhat of a battleground between the three leading Portland newspapers, with The Oregonian backing the official version of what happened, and its rivals, the Portland Tribune and (to a lesser extent) the Willamette Week questioning the official record. In May 2005, the Oregonian published the results of an investigation into the case, which concluded that Gable was indeed the killer, and that the killing was a robbery gone wrong. The Tribune ran a rebuttal, claiming to have uncovered holes in the Oregonian's reporting, which was followed by a further rebuttal by the Oregonian reporters in the newspaper's blog.

A leading advocate of the conspiracy theory is local journalist Phil Stanford. Stanford has written extensively on the case, and wrote the screenplay for a film based on the Francke murder, Without Evidence (1995), featuring a young Angelina Jolie, in one of her first major roles, as Jodie Swearingen. Ernie Garrett portrayed Francke. Stanford, then a columnist for The Oregonian, testified in the trial for the defense. He continued writing about the case in his Oregonian column until leaving the paper in 1994; he now writes for the Portland Tribune and continues to cover the case there.

In February 1991, prior to Gable's conviction, the Michael Francke story was featured on an episode of the TV program Unsolved Mysteries. The case was also the subject of a 2019 true crime podcast called Murder in Oregon, produced by iHeartRadio.

== See also ==
- Harry Minto, supervisor of Oregon State Penitentiary, killed in line of duty by inmate in 1915.
