= I'll Believe You =

- Promotional poster
- Directed by: Paul Francis Sullivan
- Written by: Paul Francis Sullivan; Sean McPharlin; Ted Sullivan
- Produced by: Leo Redgate; Kevin Sullivan; Ted Sullivan
- Starring: David Alan Basche; Patrick Warburton; Siobhan Fallon; Fred Willard; Chris Elliott; Ed Helms; Mo Rocca
- Cinematography: John Mans
- Edited by: Jon Griggs; Greg Lee; Ted Sullivan
- Music by: J.J. McGeehan
- Distributed by: Stand Up Films
- Release dates: November 11, 2006 (Melbourne Independent Filmmakers Festival); November 9, 2007 (United States)
- Running time: 82 minutes
- Country: United States
- Language: English

I'll Believe You is a 2006 American comedy film starring David Alan Basche, Patrick Warburton and Siobhan Fallon.

Late-night radio host Dale Sweeney (David Alan Basche)'s usual line up of odd-ball, conspiracy-obsessed callers is interrupted by a panicked phone call in an indecipherable language. When FBI agents arrive investigating the call, Dale enlists his friends help to uncover what he hopes is the amazing identity of this first time caller.

== Plot summary ==
Dale Sweeney, the radio host of an immensely unpopular late-night talk program on the AM dial, only ever drums up listeners who are nutty, half-zonked small-town denizens who want to discuss UFO sightings on the airwaves. Just prior to the final broadcast, with the program in arm's length of cancellation, Sweeney receives a strange phone call from an individual who speaks anxiously in an unintelligible language. The next morning, two federal agents turn up to question Sweeney, demonstrating heightened interest in one of the latest UFO sightings. Dale thus concludes that the caller was in fact an extraterrestrial, lost in his small town. He decides to report on the happenings during his broadcasts (which quadruples his audience size) and then bandies the locals into a collective search for the alien.

== Cast and characters ==
- David Alan Basche - Dale Sweeney
- Patrick Warburton - Dr. Seth Douglass
- Siobhan Fallon Hogan - Larry Jean
- Fred Willard - Mr. Fratus
- Chris Elliott - Eugene the Gator Guy
- Ed Helms - Leon
- Mo Rocca - Dr. Francis H. Flenderman, PHD
- Thomas Gibson - Kyle Sweeney
- Patrick Gallo - Officer Nick Senna

== Production ==
The film, originally titled 'First Time Caller', was written by brothers Paul Francis Sullivan and Ted Sullivan, along with their high school friend Sean McPharlin, and then edited by writer-producer Ted Sullivan, along with high school friend Greg Lee. The soundtrack features the song, "Ode to Star L23," a lesser known song by We Are Scientists, as well as songs by The Hold Steady and The Fray.
