= Gill Dennis =

American film director

- Born: James Gill Dennis; January 25, 1941; Charlottesville, Virginia, U.S.
- Died: May 13, 2015 (aged 74); Portland, Oregon, U.S.
- Education: Reed College; American Film Institute (MFA)
- Occupations: Director, producer, screenwriter, actor
- Years active: 1973–2015
- Spouses: Elizabeth Hartman (m. 1968; div. 1984): Kristen Peckinpah Dennis
- Children: 2

Gill Dennis (January 25, 1941 – May 13, 2015) was an American director and screenwriter.

== Early life and career ==
Dennis was the son of psychologist Wayne Dennis, author of "The Hopi Child." He attended Reed College for two years and served in Korea in the U.S. Army. In 1971, he graduated from AFI Conservatory’s first class that began in 1969 and included Tom Rickman, Terrence Malick, David Lynch, and Caleb Deschanel. He later taught there as a master filmmaker-in-residence and conducted classes world-wide. He and Tom Rickman started and directed the Community of Writers Screenwriting Program. He was the recipient of the Los Angeles Drama Critics Circle Award for Distinguished Direction in Theatre.

== Personal life and death ==
His first wife was actress Elizabeth Hartman, whom he divorced in 1984. He died in Portland, Oregon, and was survived by his wife, Kristen Peckinpah Dennis, and two sons.

== Filmography ==
Director

- Intermission (1973)
- Balaam (1975 ‧ Play ‧ World premiere)
- Without Evidence (1995)

Writer

- Intermission (1973)
- Return to Oz (1985) (Note: Dennis wrote a 1985 storybook for this film - ‘’Return to Oz Storybook’’ published by Walt Disney Company ISBN 9780307158314, ISBN 0307158314)
- Home Fires (1987)
- On My Own (1991)
- Without Evidence (1995)
- Riders of the Purple Sage (1996)
- The Man on Lincoln's Nose (2000 ‧ Documentary ‧ Oscar-nominated)
- Walk the Line (2005) (Oscar-nominated) (Note: Dennis wrote an essay regarding his time with Johnny Cash in preparing the script for Walk the Line.)
- Forever (2015)
