= Heights (film) =

2005 American drama film

- Theatrical release poster
- Directed by: Chris Terrio
- Screenplay by: Amy Fox
- Based on: Heights by Amy Fox
- Produced by: Ismail Merchant; Richard Hawley
- Starring: Glenn Close; Elizabeth Banks; James Marsden; Jesse Bradford
- Cinematography: Jim Denault
- Edited by: Sloane Klevin
- Music by: Ben Butler; Martin Erskine
- Production company: Merchant Ivory Productions
- Distributed by: Sony Pictures Classics
- Release dates: January 24, 2005 (Sundance); June 17, 2005 (United States)
- Running time: 93 minutes
- Country: United States
- Language: English
- Box office: $1.3 million

Heights is a 2005 American drama film directed by Chris Terrio and written by Amy Fox, based on her 2001 stage play of the same name. It follows a pivotal twenty-four hours in the interconnected lives of five New Yorkers. It stars Elizabeth Banks, James Marsden, Glenn Close, Jesse Bradford, and John Light. Numerous prominent actors such as Eric Bogosian, George Segal, and Isabella Rossellini appear in supporting roles.

Heights was produced by Merchant Ivory Productions. It premiered at the 2005 Sundance Film Festival on January 24, 2005, and received a limited theatrical release in the United States on June 17, 2005, through Sony Pictures Classics.

== Plot ==
Over the course of 24 hours, a group of New Yorkers, whose lives are interconnected, must make pivotal decisions about their relationships. Most notably, Isabel, a photographer, is having second thoughts about her engagement to Jonathan, while her award-winning actress mother Diana suspects that her husband is having an affair and thus questions the open nature of her marriage.

== Cast ==
- Glenn Close as Diana Lee
- Elizabeth Banks as Isabel Lee
- James Marsden as Jonathan Kestler
- Jesse Bradford as Alec Lochka
- John Light as Peter Cole
- Rufus Wainwright as Jeremy
- Denis O'Hare as Andrew
- Eric Bogosian as Henry
- George Segal as Rabbi Mendel
- Andrew Howard as Ian
- Isabella Rossellini as Liz
- Matthew Davis as Mark
- Michael Murphy as Jesse
- Chandler Williams as Juilliard Macbeth
- Bess Wohl as Juilliard Lady Macbeth
- Thomas Lennon as Marshall
- Jim Parsons as Oliver
- Angel Desai as Laura

== Release ==
In January 2004, Sony Pictures Classics acquired distribution rights to the film for North and Latin America, Australia, New Zealand, Scandinavia and Spain. The film premiered at the 2005 Sundance Film Festival on January 24, 2005, before receiving a limited theatrical release on June 17.

== Reception ==
=== Critical response ===
On the review aggregator website Rotten Tomatoes, 63% of 104 critics' reviews are positive, with an average rating of 6.2/10. The website's consensus reads: "Yet another movie about relationships in the Big Apple, Heights is never dull thanks to a competent cast." Metacritic, which uses a weighted average, assigned the film a score of 59 out of 100, based on 25 critics, indicating "mixed or average" reviews. Roger Ebert gave the film a positive review, stating that "its chief pleasure comes through simple voyeurism. It is entertaining to see the lives of complex people become brutally simple all of a sudden. Variety noted the quality of the ensemble acting.

=== Box office ===
Heights grossed $1.2 million in the United States and Canada, and $0.1 million in other territories, for a worldwide total of $1.3 million.

=== Awards ===
The film received an award from the Casting Society of America for Best Independent Feature Film Casting (with the award going to James Calleri).
