= Backwards (2012 film) =

2012 film by Ben Hickernell

- Directed by: Ben Hickernell
- Written by: Sarah Megan Thomas
- Produced by: Sarah Megan Thomas
- Starring: James Van Der Beek, Sarah Megan Thomas, Margaret Colin
- Cinematography: Harlan Bosmajian
- Edited by: Phillip Bartell
- Music by: David Torn
- Distributed by: Phase4 Films, DaDaFilms
- Release date: September 21, 2012
- Running time: 89 minutes
- Country: United States

Backwards is a 2012 American sports romance film starring Sarah Megan Thomas and James Van Der Beek. The film is directed by Ben Hickernell and written by Sarah Megan Thomas. It is the first feature film on women's Olympic rowing.

The film was released on September 21 in theaters following the 2012 Summer Olympics which featured rowing events.

Real-life Team USA Olympic rowers Megan Kalmoe, Susan Francia and Caryn Davies, who won the bronze medal at the 2012 Summer Olympics in the quadruple sculls event, attended the film's red carpet movie premiere in New York City.

The film was well received by audiences with iTunes reviewers rating it 4 out of 5 stars. The film was referred to as "a must see for sports enthusiasts." The film was well received in reviews as a feel-good sports drama. Los Angeles Times reviewed the film positively for how it "nicely captures rowing's grace and beauty -- and pain and glory -- against a lovely array of iconic Philadelphia backdrops.... A warm film."

Backwards is rated PG and was awarded the Dove “Family-Approved” Seal.

The film was released in 2020 on iTunes and Amazon.

== Plot ==
When a competitive rower fails to make the Olympic team for the second time, she takes a coaching job at her former high school. Adjusting to life off the race course is littered with multiple challenges. Backwards is a look at the personal sacrifices and complex choices facing competitive Olympic hopefuls.

== Cast ==
- Sarah Megan Thomas as Abigail Brooks
- James Van Der Beek as Geoff
- Margaret Colin as Mrs. Brooks
- Glenn Moreshower as Coach Spriklin
- Alexandra Metz as Hannah.
