= Treading Water (2001 film) =

2001 film by Lauren Himmel

- Directed by: Lauren Himmel (as Lauren Himmelvo)
- Written by: Lauren Himmel; Julia Hollinger
- Produced by: Lauren Himmel; Julia Hollinger
- Starring: Angela Redman; Nina Landey; Annette Miller
- Cinematography: Gary Henoch
- Edited by: Hilary Schroeder
- Music by: Kristopher Carter
- Production company: Tunnel Vision Productions
- Distributed by: Wolfe Video (2002) (US); Optimale (2006) (France)
- Release date: June 15, 2001
- Running time: 94 minutes
- Country: United States
- Language: English

Treading Water is a 2001 American lesbian-themed film directed and produced by Lauren Himmel. The screenplay was written by Himmel and Julia Hollinger. The film stars Angela Redman and Nina Landey. It deals with the ultimately intractable problems faced by Redman's character "Casey" in dealing with her family who are hostile to her lifestyle in general and her girlfriend, played by Landey, in particular.

It was shown in competition on June 15 at the 2001 Seattle Film Festival and the Los Angeles Outfest and released on DVD in 2002. It received its British premiere on 4 April 2002 at the London Lesbian and Gay Film Festival. It was financed by Tunnel Vision Productions.

Lauren Himmel won the Audience Award for "Best Emerging Filmmaker" at the 2002 Santa Cruz Film Festival. Treading Water was nominated for "Best Feature Film" at the 2002 Torino International Gay & Lesbian Film Festival.

The film was reviewed by Variety in 2001 by Ken Eisner and called an "earnest, rudimentary drama" and "not much more than a calling-card effort and will sink soon after that". Val Kermode gave the film 1 out 5 stars and said it contained the "Most Clumsily Inserted Flashback".
