= Equity (film) =

2016 American film directed by Meera Menon

- Theatrical release poster
- Directed by: Meera Menon
- Screenplay by: Amy Fox
- Story by: Amy Fox; Alysia Reiner; Sarah Megan Thomas
- Produced by: Alysia Reiner; Sarah Megan Thomas
- Starring: Anna Gunn; James Purefoy; Sarah Megan Thomas; Alysia Reiner
- Cinematography: Eric Lin
- Edited by: Andrew Hafitz
- Music by: Alexis & Sam
- Production company: Broad Street Pictures
- Distributed by: Sony Pictures Classics
- Release dates: January 25, 2016 (Sundance); July 29, 2016 (United States)
- Running time: 100 minutes
- Country: United States
- Language: English
- Box office: $1.7 million

Equity is a 2016 American financial thriller film directed by Meera Menon, written by Amy Fox and starring Anna Gunn, James Purefoy, Sarah Megan Thomas and Alysia Reiner.

The film premiered In Competition at the 2016 Sundance Film Festival on January 25, 2016. Shortly before its premiere, it was acquired for theatrical distribution by Sony Pictures Classics and was released in the United States on July 29, 2016, to positive critical reviews.

== Plot ==
Naomi Bishop is a senior investment banker who deals with IPOs. After her latest project is undervalued she faces professional setbacks including clients losing confidence in her work. To bounce back she is hired to handle the IPO for Cachet, a privacy company with a social networking platform.

Around the same time Naomi bumps into Samantha Ryan, an old college classmate who now works as a federal prosecutor investigating white collar crime. Unbeknownst to Naomi, Samantha is investigating Naomi's on-again, off-again boyfriend Michael Connor, a broker at the same firm as Naomi who Samantha suspects is involved in insider trading. Michael tries to get information from Naomi about Cachet but fails.

While doing due diligence, Naomi learns from Marin, one of the coders, that Cachet is hackable. Despite having a nagging feeling that something is wrong, the numbers check out and Naomi continues to try to sell the shares of the company to investors. Michael, who has had no new insider trading tips to pass on to his friends at investment firm Titanite, tries unsuccessfully to hack into Naomi's phone.

Erin Manning, Naomi's assistant on the IPO, learns that Marin has been fired. To warn Naomi of this, she goes to Michael's home after not being able to reach Naomi and ends up leaking the information to him in the hope that he will be able to get her a promotion, something Naomi has been unable to do for her. Michael leaks the tips to his friends at Titanite and then sends the story to an old college roommate who is a tech journalist.

Naomi figures out that it was Erin who betrayed her, based on her having a green pen, the same type of pen that Michael uses. When the shares open, confidence is lost and the company loses a third of its value on the first day of trading.

Michael changes jobs to Titanite, neglecting to take Erin with him. Naomi is fired, while Erin assumes her position. Unable to crack the case from the outside, Samantha interviews for a high-paying corporate position, saying that she is in it for the money using words from a speech she heard Naomi give at an alumni event.

== Cast ==
- Anna Gunn as Naomi Bishop
- James Purefoy as Michael Connor
- Sarah Megan Thomas as Erin Manning
- Alysia Reiner as Samantha Ryan
- Craig Bierko as Benjamin "Benji" Akers
- Margaret Colin as Attorney Cahn
- Nate Corddry as Cory
- Samuel Roukin as Ed
- Lee Tergesen as Randall
- Sophie von Haselberg as Marin
- James Naughton as John
- Tracie Thoms as Melanie
- Carolyn McCormick as Naomi's Doctor (Uncredited)

== Production ==
Meera Menon was brought on board to direct in March 2015. Anna Gunn signed on to star in June 2015 with James Purefoy joining shortly after.

== Release ==
=== Box office ===
Equity grossed $1.6 million in the United States and Canada and $65,116 in other territories for a worldwide total of $1.7 million. Its widest release was in 255 theaters.

=== Critical reception ===
Equity received positive reviews from critics. On review aggregator site Rotten Tomatoes the film has an approval rating of 82%, based on 97 reviews, with an average rating of 6.4/10. The site's critical consensus reads, "Equity brings a welcome change of perspective to the financial thriller genre, along with a nuanced story and a terrific cast led by a powerful effort from Anna Gunn." Metacritic, which assigns a weighted average rating to reviews from mainstream critics, gives the film a score of 68 out of 100, based on 29 reviews, indicating "generally favorable" reviews.

Ignatiy Vishnevetsky of The A.V. Club wrote: "Equity may not be the fanciest or flashiest of financial thrillers—more like off-brand David Fincher or Steven Soderbergh—but it gets the job done. Its major players are all women trying to make careers in boys’ club professions [...]; that's all the motivation the movie offers and perhaps all that it really needs. It skips past the usual handwringing over the temptations of capitalist wealth and just gets right to the risk-taking and double-crossing, assuming (rightly) that viewers don't need a character to have a backstory, a tragic secret, and a dead spouse, best friend, or parent to understand why they'd do anything to hold on to a career."
