= Phil Stanford =

American journalist and author

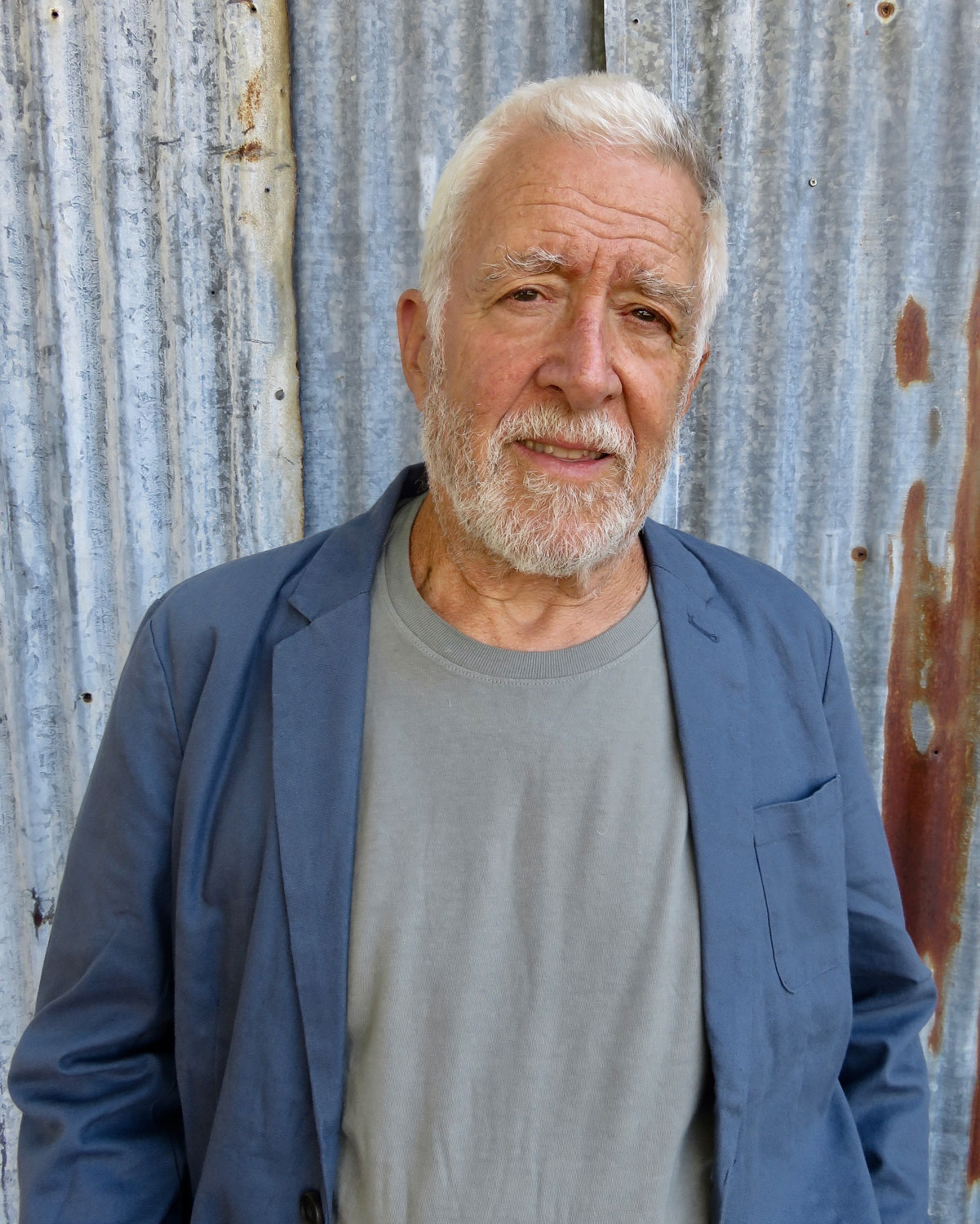
- Stanford in 2019
- Occupations: Journalist and Author

Phil Stanford is an American journalist and author. He is best known for his work on the 1989 murder of Oregon Department of Corrections director Michael Francke and his efforts to prove the innocence of Frank Gable, who was wrongfully convicted of the crime. His 1994 Oregonian series on the “Happy Face Killer” case resulted in two innocent people being released from prison. And his book The Peyton-Allan Files makes the case that the 1960 murder of two Portland teenagers was committed by the serial killer Ed Edwards and not the two men wrongly convicted of the crime. He is the author of Portland Confidential and three other books, as well as the lead writer and an executive producer of the hit podcast series "Murder in Oregon: Who Killed Michael Francke?"

== Career ==
=== The Oregonian ===
From 1987 to 1994, Stanford wrote a column for the Oregonian which covered crime and local politics. Despite the popularity of the column and the success of the "Happy Face Killer" series, disagreements with management over his coverage of the Francke murder led Stanford to quit the paper in 1994. Stanford continued to write about the Francke case and police corruption in his column for the Portland Tribune, which ran from 2001 to 2008.

=== Early career ===
After getting out of the army in 1968, Stanford worked as a legman for I.F. Stone in Washington, D.C., then moved to Portland, Oregon, where he started a political magazine, Oregon Times. He subsequently returned to D.C. where he wrote for a number publications including The New York Times Magazine, Columbia Journalism Review, The Washingtonian, and Parade. Before returning to Oregon in 1987 to take a job with the Oregonian, he also worked as an aide to Congressman Les Aspin, editor and columnist for the political magazine Inquiry in San Francisco, crime writer for the Miami News, and in a hiatus from journalism entirely, as a private investigator in Miami.

=== Books ===
Stanford's first book, Portland Confidential, which won the Independent Publisher's “Best True Crime Award” for 2005, was described by one reviewer as “an entertaining trip back to a film noir incarnation of the Rose City”. The Peyton-Allan Files, about the 1960 lovers’ lane slaying of two Portland teenagers, purports to solve the most sensational murder in Portland history. White House Call Girl, Stanford's only departure from Portland subject matter, presents a different perspective on the infamous 1972 Watergate break-in. His book Rose City Vice deals with a 1970s vice cop scandal and subsequent official cover-up. Other publications include a collection of his columns from the Oregonian entitled Do You Know How Much a Light Year Is? and a graphic novel City of Roses with artist Patric Reynolds.

=== Podcasts ===
Stanford worked with iHeartRadio podcasts to produce the 12 part series "Murder in Oregon: Who Killed Michael Francke?," which climbed to No. 4 on the Amazon podcast charts. He was also involved in another iHeart production, Murder in Miami, which was supposed to be based on his merry adventures as a private eye in Miami, but turned out to be a flop.

== Works ==
=== Books ===
- Do You Know How Much a Light Year Is? Touchstone Press (1991).
- Portland Confidential: Sex, Crime, and Corruption in the Rose City. Westwinds (2004).
- The Peyton-Allan Files. Ptown Books (2010).
- White House Call Girl. Port Townsend, Wash.: Feral House (2013).
  - Evidence Package.
- City of Roses: Crime Does Not Pay, with Patric Reynolds. Milwaukie, Ore.: Dark Horse Comics (2014).
- Rose City Vice: Portland in the '70s—Dirty Cops and Dirty Robbers. Port Townsend, Wash.: Feral House (2017).

=== Articles ===
- "The Charge of the White Horse Brigade." Inquiry, (Oct. 29, 1979), pp. 6–7.
- "Watergate Revisited." Columbia Journalism Review (Mar./Apr. 1986).
- "The Automated Battlefield." New York Times Magazine. Feb. 23, 1975 issue
- The deadly 'move to sea'." New York Times Magazine. Sep. 25, 1975 issue
- “Mine Shafts Will Be Nuclear Shelters,” Parade. Jun. 15, 1975 issue
- "Roots and grafts." Inquiry. Apr. 16, 1979 issue
