= Amy Fox (playwright) =

American screenwriter

- Occupation: Playwright

Amy Fox is a playwright and screenwriter based in New York City. She has penned numerous full-length plays, including Summer Cyclone, Farm Boys, and Nothing Revolutionary, as well as having written a good number of one-acts. Fox also wrote the screenplay for the 2004 Merchant Ivory film Heights, based on her one-act play of the same name.

== Career ==
Fox wrote the screenplay to the 2016 film Equity. The film premiered at the 2016 Sundance Film Festival.

=== Heights production history ===
2010: Marietta College One Act Festival. Group A. Directed by TJ TianQi Jin. Supervised by Prof. Jeffery Cordell. Amateur Student Production.
