= List of California Dreams episodes =

California Dreams is an American teen sitcom. The series ran for five seasons, airing on NBC from September 12, 1992, to December 14, 1996, as part of the network's Saturday morning TNBC teen-focused programming block. It was created by writers Brett Dewey and Ronald B. Solomon, was produced by Franco Bario, and was executive produced by Peter Engel as his first followup to Saved by the Bell for NBC. California Dreams centered on a group of friends who form the fictional titular band.

== Series overview ==
Season	Episodes	Originally released	
Season	Episodes	First released	Last released
1	13	September 12, 1992	December 5, 1992
2	18	September 11, 1993	February 5, 1994
3	17	September 10, 1994	January 7, 1995
4	15	September 9, 1995	April 6, 1996
5	15	September 7, 1996	December 14, 1996

California 1990

== Episodes ==
=== Season 1 (1992) ===
In its first season, California Dreams was conceived as being as much a family sitcom as a teen sitcom about the titular band, which is reflected by the fact that the Garrison parents, as well as Matt and Jenny Garrison's younger brother Dennis, were a part of the cast:

- Brent Gore as Matt Garrison
- Heidi Noelle Lenhart as Jenny Garrison
- Michael Cade as Sylvester "Sly" Winkle
- Kelly Packard as Tiffani Smith
- William James Jones as Tony Wicks
- Michael Cutt as Mr. Richard Garrison
- Gail Ramsey as Mrs. Melody Garrison
- Ryan O'Neill as Dennis Garrison

List of California Dreams season 1 episodes
No. overall	No. in season	Title	Directed by	Written by	Original release date	Prod. code
1	1	"The First Gig"	Don Barnhart	Brett Dewey & Ronald B. Solomon	September 12, 1992	6052
The band gets their first gig, playing for a girl that Matt has a bit of a crush on- Randi Jo. The date of the gig is the same day that Matt's dad is planning on taking a family trip to the Grand Canyon. The band plans to get the date of the tickets switched by posing as Van Halen. The band also appoints Sly as manager of the band.
2	2	"Battle of the Bands"	Don Barnhart	Noah Taft	September 19, 1992	6051
Matt is determined to win the Battle of the Bands contest. The California Dreams are up against their biggest competition - Bradley and the Billionaires. Sly's idea of how to win the contest is to get one of the judges, Angela to vote for them. All Matt needs to do is date her to swing the vote. Tony also thinks about getting an earring, until Tiffani tells him how they pierce an ear.
3	3	"Beat of His Own Drum"	Don Barnhart	Noah Taft	September 26, 1992	6053
Tony's dad does not believe that Tony should be part of the band. This leads Tony to quit the band and so he starts playing football to try and get his dad's approval. Tiffani finds out that she has a secret admirer that could be Dennis.
4	4	"Double Date"	Don Barnhart	Tony Soltis	October 3, 1992	6055
Sharkey goes on a vacation and leaves Tony in charge. Sly, the wannabe money-maker that he is, talks Tony into throwing a big Hawaiian-style party at Sharkey's, complete with a cover charge for every partier there. Sly books the band to play the party. Trouble is, Matt has already promised his crush, Randi Jo, that they will perform that same night at her sister, Debbie's, wedding. The party can't be cancelled as Sly has already used some of Sharkey's money for promoting the event. Matt can't cancel on Randi Jo because he doesn't want to disappoint her.
5	5	"Dream Man"	Don Barnhart	Brett Dewey & Ronald B. Solomon	October 10, 1992	6060
Sly and Tony decide to listen in on Jenny's slumber party and hears Jenny talking about her dream guy. Sly decides to try and change his personality to be the man of Jenny's dreams. While Sly hits on Jenny, Tony's busy with her friend Jasmine. Tiffani writes lyrics to a song, but Matt just can't come out and tell her that they aren't good.
6	6	"Friends First"	Don Barnhart	Tony Soltis	October 17, 1992	6054
Matt's friend from music camp, Teddy, comes to visit. Matt, expecting the old overweight Teddy, is shocked when Teddy turns to look much different than he did at music camp. Jenny and Tiffani take an instant liking to Teddy, causing a problem between the two of them. Now, Matt's job is to help mend the girls friendship and stop the fight over Teddy. During this fiasco, Sly gets the band a chance to play at Sharkey's.
7	7	"Guess Who's Coming to Brunch"	Don Barnhart	Brett Dewey & Ronald B. Solomon	October 24, 1992	6061
After playing at Sharkey's, the band's amp blows out and Tony starts dating rich girl Kimberly Blanchard. She invites him to come meet her parents at brunch. When Kimberly leaves the room, her father offers to replace the band's amp on one condition: that Tony stops dating Kimberly. Tony deals with the problem of how to tell Kimberly about the proposition that her father made to him. While this is going on, Sly is busy getting the band another gig recording the jingle for an Uncle Slappy's Root Beer commercial.
8	8	"It's a Guy Thing"	Don Barnhart	Noah Taft	October 31, 1992	6062
Jenny and Tiffani create a fake supermodel from Paris named Monique to show Sly and Tony how shallow they are. The plan ends up backfiring on the girls, then working out to their advantage. During this, the Garrison family tries to fix their broken washing machine and saving themselves from calling a real professional.
9	9	"Mother and Child Reunion"	Don Barnhart	Brett Dewey & Ronald B. Solomon	November 7, 1992	6059
Tiffani's mother finally returns to reunite with her daughter after trying to become a dancer for ten years in New York. The reunion doesn't go so well and Tiffani's anger finally catches up with her in the middle of her 16th birthday party.
10	10	"Romancing the Tube"	Don Barnhart	Noah Taft	November 14, 1992	6063
Sly figures out a way to pick up chicks by becoming a surfer. Sly tries to get Tiffani to teach him how to surf and she agrees. After they start out lessons, Tiffani and Sly realize that there's something besides friendship between them. However, Tiffani's afraid that Sly wouldn't be able to commit to one girl. Matt, Jenny and Tony decide to try and get the band a new lighting system and get a job painting some of the Garrison's rooms. Mr. Garrison agrees to pay them $300 in advance to buy the equipment with.
11	11	"They Shoot Videos, Don't They?"	Don Barnhart	Tony Soltis	November 21, 1992	6057
Sly decides that the band should enter a video contest. His vision for the video is to have the band chased by girls until Nicki Dentine kisses Matt at the end. Randi Jo, Matt's girlfriend, however, does not find the concept very appealing. Sly tricks Matt into getting the kiss and Randi Jo breaks up with Matt as a result. The breakup leads to a new song for the band written by Matt and a new video concept for Sly.
12	12	"The Time"	Don Barnhart	Brett Dewey & Ronald B. Solomon	November 28, 1992	6056
Sly gets the band at gig at Santa Barbara but they need transportation, so Sly gets an old VW Campervan but it's not running. Jenny starts dating her ex-boyfriend Eric who dumped her 6 months earlier and starts missing band practice which upsets Matt. Jenny realizes Eric hasn't changed and leaves him and is able to make the gig.
13	13	"Where's Dennis"	Don Barnhart	Jeffrey J. Sachs	December 5, 1992	6058
While Mr. and Mrs. Garrison are away for the evening, Matt is in charge of babysitting his little brother Dennis. The band sets up a performance at the Garrison's house, but Dennis end up running away.

=== Season 2 (1993–94) ===
In the second season of California Dreams, the Garrison family was de-emphasized – Heidi Noelle Lenhart herself left the show, and Jenny was written out in the season's third episode – and the show was refocused on the band, including the new band members – guitarist Jake, and new singer Sam Woo (from the fourth episode of season 2 on):

- Brent Gore as Matt Garrison
- Heidi Noelle Lenhart as Jenny Garrison (Note: Main credited for the first two episodes and 17th episode of season #2 only.)
- Kelly Packard as Tiffani Smith
- William James Jones as Tony Wicks
- Michael Cade as Sylvester "Sly" Winkle
- Jay Anthony Franke as Jake Sommers
- Jennie Kwan as Samantha Woo (Note: Main cast credited from the third episode of season #2 on except for the 17th episode.)

Notes

List of California Dreams season 2 episodes
No. overall	No. in season	Title	Directed by	Written by	Original release date	Prod. code
14	1	"Jake's Song"	Don Barnhart	Brett Dewey & Ronald B. Solomon	September 11, 1993	6064
The band is scared of "tough guy" Jake Sommers at school then Jake surprises everyone when he tells Matt that he wants to join the band; despite the fact that they're impressed with his songwriting skills, they worry that his image clashes with theirs. Meanwhile, Tiffani gets a job at Sharkey's as Tony's manager.
15	2	"Ciao, Jenny"	Don Barnhart	Noah Taft	September 18, 1993	6066
Jenny is offered the chance to audition for a prestigious music conservatory in Rome, but because Jake has started to fall for her, he gets Sly to help him sabotage her performance.
16	3	"Wooing Woo"	Don Barnhart	Brett Dewey & Ronald B. Solomon	September 25, 1993	6067
Matt, Tony, Sly and Jake devise a bet to see who can be the first one to kiss Samantha Woo, the new exchange student from Hong Kong who moves in with the Garrisons. When Sam learns about their plan, she comes up with one of her own.
17	4	"Sleazy Rider"	Don Barnhart	David Garber	October 2, 1993	6068
Jake leaves his prized motorcycle in Matt's care when he goes out of town. Tiffani and Tony think that there might be more than friendship between them. Sly borrows Jake's bike and ends up causing an accident that sends Tony to the hospital and Jake's bike gets wrecked, ruining his chances of winning a motorcycle contest.
18	5	"The Sly Who Came to Dinner"	Don Barnhart	Todd J. Greenwald & Rob Hammersley	October 9, 1993	6073
With his parents out of town, Sly moves in with the Garrisons in the hopes of winning over Samantha he ends irritating everyone instead. Meanwhile, Tony and Jake believe that Tiffani's secret admirer is an obsessed stalker.
19	6	"Surfboards and Cycles"	Don Barnhart	Tony Soltis	October 16, 1993	6076
When Sly decides to take home economics, the gang gets into a debate over which is tougher; the typically "female" classes, like home economics, or the typically "male" classes, like mechanics. To prove that they can do it, the guys join Sly in baking cakes taught by Sgt. McBride, while Tiffani decides to take shop alongside Jake. There, they begin to fall for each other, but worry that they're too different to make their romance last.
20	7	"A Question of Math"	Miguel Higuera	Debra Fasciano	October 23, 1993	7401
With mid-term exams coming up, Sam starts tutoring her classmates, including the guy that she's been crushing on, football player Darrin Young but he just wants help to pass the test without paying her. Meanwhile, the stress of exams gets to the rest of the gang in different ways; Matt takes up meditation, while Jake and Tiffani are constantly at each other's throats.
21	8	"High Plains Dreamer"	Patrick Maloney	Noah Taft	October 30, 1993	7403
Worried that his date's ex-boyfriend, Beau, is going to challenge him to a fight, Tony faints and has a dream in which he and the gang are in the Wild West, and he must defeat Beau in a shoot-out.
22	9	"Bwa Ha Ha Means I Love You"	Patrick Maloney	David Garber	November 6, 1993	7402
Jake gets an embarrassing job at a local music store so that he can earn enough money to buy Tiffani a present for their three-month anniversary. He'd like to keep the job a secret, but that becomes tough to do when Sly convinces the store manager to sell some of the band's demo tapes. Tiffani thinks that Jake might be cheating on her.
23	10	"Vote of Confidence"	Don Barnhart	Noah Taft	November 13, 1993	6070
In order to impress his over-achieving Ivy League older brother Kyle, Jake runs for student body president but struggles to feel at ease in the position. Meanwhile, to settle a debt with Jake's obnoxious opposition Harvey, the band sets him up on a date with Tiffani.
24	11	"The Year of the Woo"	Don Barnhart	Noah Taft	November 20, 1993	6074
Samantha has to decide whether to spend the money that her parents gave her on a trip back to Hong Kong to spend the Chinese New Year with her family, or on much-needed repairs for the band's van. She hopes that she can do both, but thanks to a crooked mechanic, she winds up with neither. The band feel bad and throw her a New Year party at Sharkey's and surprise Sam by having her parents fly over.
25	12	"Schoolhouse Rock"	Miguel Higuera	Brett Dewey	November 27, 1993	7404
The Dreams get the chance to audition for Sting's manager, but the ruthless Ms. McBride's eagerness to hand out detention slips might keep some of the members from making it. Jake and Tiffani have to try to escape detention in order to make the audition with the rest of the band.
26	13	"Save the Shark"	Don Barnhart	Paul Lander	December 4, 1993	6072
Matt falls for the new girl, Katie, but quickly learns that she is only staying in town long enough for her father Mr. Stone, the new owner of Sharkey's, to tear it down and build condos in its place. The gang then bands together to try to save their favorite hang-out.
27	14	"21 Jake Street"	Don Barnhart	David Garber	December 25, 1993	6071
A new girl with an eye for bad boys is drawn to Jake, though her motives are not what they seem. Meanwhile, Tony and Matt use Tiffani and Sam as the inspiration for their art projects, while the band sets out to acquire some fake IDs so that they can play a 21+ club.
28	15	"Can't Buy Me Love"	Don Barnhart	Tony Soltis	January 8, 1994	6069
The gang participates in a school fund-raiser where students are auctioned off as servants to whichever classmate is the highest bidder. Sly tries to win over his crush the beautiful Julie Pruitt, while Matt inadvertently becomes Tony's boss.
29	16	"Rebel Without a Clue"	Don Barnhart	David Garber	January 15, 1994	6075
Sly decides to crack down and study to impress a tough teacher. But because he's never taken school seriously in the past, when he aces the test, the teacher thinks he cheated. Meanwhile, Sam and Tiffani argue over which of them should get to sing lead vocals on the band's new song.
30	17	"Dirty Dog Days"	Don Barnhart	Tony Soltis	January 29, 1994	6065
The guys start fooling around with an old radio transmitter of Sly's using false names, and eventually decide to air some of the Dreams music, crediting the band as The Dirty Dogs. The songs are a huge hit, but when the guys tell everyone that the Dogs have been The California Dreams all along, no one believes them. To make matters worse, it turns out they've been broadcasting illegally, and the FCC shows up to shut them down. Note: This episode shows Heidi Noelle Lenhart as Jenny Garrison instead of Jennie Kwan as Samantha Woo as it was meant to be the second episode of Season 2 before Jenny's departure.
31	18	"Indecent Promposal"	Miguel Higuera	Ronald B. Solomon	February 5, 1994	7405
With the prom coming up, the gang struggles to find dates. That includes Jake and Tiffani, since Tiffani has her heart set on going, while Jake would rather skip the whole thing. The situation becomes even more complicated when Tiffani receives an offer from a platonic friend who says that he'll score the band a summer-long gig if she accepts.

=== Season 3 (1994–95) ===
In the third season of California Dreams, the Garrison family element was eliminated and Brent Gore was dropped from the show. In his place, two new cast members were added – Lorena Costa, a rich girl who effectively became the band's "groupie", and new keyboardist/guitarist/drummer Mark Winkle, who is Sly's cousin. The cast from the show's third season remained unchanged through the fourth and fifth seasons of the series:

- Kelly Packard as Tiffani Smith
- William James Jones as Tony Wicks
- Michael Cade as Sylvester "Sly" Winkle
- Jay Anthony Franke as Jake Sommers
- Jennie Kwan as Samantha Woo
- Diana Uribe as Lorena Costa
- Aaron Jackson as Mark Winkle

List of California Dreams season 3 episodes
No. overall	No. in season	Title	Directed by	Written by	Original release date	Prod. code
32	1	"The Unforgiven"	Patrick Maloney	Ronald B. Solomon	September 10, 1994	60252
After the Garrison family moves away, including Matt, Sam moves in with Lorena Costa. The band also get to use her place to practice from now on. Unfortunately, all their equipment is at a pawn shop and they have to get it back. They also need to find a replacement for Matt. Sly thinks that his cousin, Mark, might be right for the job, but Mark has had a bad case of stage fright ever since Sly embarrassed him at Carnegie Hall.
33	2	"Follow Your Dreams"	Patrick Maloney	Lynnie Greene & Richard Levine	September 17, 1994	60251
Everyone takes a career aptitude test at school that will tell them what career would be perfect for them. Mark a guidance counselor, Sam a photographer, Tiffani a veterinarian, Jake a florist, and Lorena and Sly both fashion designers. In trying to get a date with Lorena, Sly copied off of her test so that they would have more in common with each other. While Jake has trouble writing a new song, he decides to work on his new florist career.
34	3	"Budget Cuts"	Patrick Maloney	Noah Taft	September 24, 1994	60255
After Sly becomes the program director for the school's radio station, he gives each of his friends their own show (with mixed results). But when the school board threatens to shut the station down due to budget cuts, Jake and Lorena go to drastic measures to save it.
35	4	"Blind Dates"	Patrick Maloney	Brett Dewey	October 1, 1994	60256
Sly meets a girl Allison online, and is thrown for a bit of a loop when he meets her in person and learns that she's blind. Meanwhile, Sam and Tony decide to try their luck at online dating too.
36	5	"Yoko, Oh No!"	Kevin Charles Sullivan	Brett Dewey	October 8, 1994	60263
When a rival band Total Defiance makes fun of Lorena for being a "groupie," she tries to convince the Dreams to let her join the band. Unfortunately, her vocal talents leave something to be desired and the gang worries that if they can't break it to her, she'll destroy their chances at winning an upcoming Battle of the Bands competition.
37	6	"The Long Goodbye"	Patrick Maloney	Noah Taft	October 15, 1994	60265
Sly is devastated when Allison tells him that she's moving away to attend a special school, and he deals with his heartbreak by ignoring her. Meanwhile, Lorena and Sam urge Jake and Tony to be more romantic, which leads them to (unsuccessfully) borrow some tactics from Tiffani's romance novel.
38	7	"Trust Me"	Miguel Higuera	Lynnie Greene & Richard Levine	October 22, 1994	60261
The gang competes in a video competition. When trying to write a new song, Mark spends a lot of time at Lorena's house. When a confused Mark kisses Lorena, a jealous Jake reacts by ending their friendship, prompting the rest of the gang to try and help smooth things over between them.
39	8	"The Princess and the Yeti"	Patrick Maloney	Noah Taft	October 29, 1994	60259
Lorena's father hires the Dreams to play at his ski resort in Colorado, giving the gang a chance to have some fun on the slopes. However, their holiday is marred by rumors of a yeti roaming the area; something which seems a lot less silly once they find themselves lost in the woods.
40	9	"Winkle/Wicks World"	Patrick Maloney	Ronald B. Solomon	November 12, 1994	60267
The band must work on a project for school, creating their own television shows. Tiffani and Mark partner up to create "Ms. Smith's Neighborhood," which is a cross between a surfing show and "Mr. Roger's Oceanside." Jake, Lorena, and Sam partner up to create "Hall Monitors," a take-off on "Cops." While Sly and Tony create "The Goo-Ga-Moo Guys," a "Wayne's World" type show for guys that are interested in girls. "The Goo-Ga-Moo Guys" becomes a hit show on a local station and Sly quits being manager of the band with Lorena filling in. However, Sly and Tony's friendship gets strained over greed.
41	10	"Daddy's Girl"	Patrick Maloney	Brett Dewey	November 19, 1994	60266
Not wanting her dad to be alone, Tiffani sets her father, Paul, up with marine biologist Ariel. This turns out to be a bad idea when Tiffani's dad spends all his time with Ariel instead of Tiffani. Mark creates a compatibility test that claims that Tony and Sam aren't compatible as well as Jake and Lorena. The couples start arguing over the results.
42	11	"Family Tree"	Patrick Maloney	Mark C. Miller	November 26, 1994	60269
A class project about family history leads Tony to dig up a part of his family's past that he'd rather ignore. Meanwhile, Mark takes on a sleazy persona when he discovers that he's related to Casanova, and Tiffani struggles to find her ancestors amidst the multitude of Smiths.
43	12	"Harley and the Marlboro Man"	Patrick Maloney	Noah Taft	December 3, 1994	60270
Jake enters a motorcycle contest and Uncle Frank pays a visit to help Jake win the competition. Jake takes up smoking and the whole gang thinks that smoking is a bad idea, especially Lorena. She threatens to not date Jake anymore if he doesn't quit. He ultimately quits when his Uncle Frank reveals he has lung cancer. The band also finds a box filled with money on the beach. Mark is left in charge of it and Sly thinks investing the money in a get-rich-quick scheme is a good idea. Note: at the end of the episode a disclaimer informs viewer on the number of death caused by lung cancer which is about every 30 minute, the same as watching an entire episode.
44	13	"Rebel Without a Nerve"	Patrick Maloney	Paul Lander	December 10, 1994	60271
The new guy at school, Tommy Keating, bad-mouths Jake around the school. After Tommy challenges Jake to a motorcycle race, Jake accepts. After hitting a speed bump at Sharkey's, Jake crashes his bike and doesn't compete in the race, resulting in being accused of being a coward. Tony and Sly also become school safety monitors.
45	14	"Boyz R Us"	Patrick Maloney	Tony Soltis	December 17, 1994	60264
An old friend from Tony's childhood, Darren, pays a visit to Tony. He asks Tony to help out one of their friends from a gang that he's joined. The friend ends up in the hospital and Tony has to decide if he should help get revenge on the gang. The rest of the band takes a job delivering singing telegrams.
46	15	"Junior Achievement"	Patrick Maloney	Lynnie Greene & Richard Levine	December 24, 1994	60257
For an economics project, the gang decide to sell Sam's Great-Great Grandmother's cold remedy. Sam is overwhelmed with greed, and has to decide between money and honor. Jake and Mark decide to create their own business as music teachers.
47	16	"The Treasure of PCH"	Patrick Maloney	Tony Soltis	December 31, 1994	60258
Lorena and Jake bet on whether or not a large sum of money could destroy the friendships between the rest of the gang. To prove it, they concoct a phony treasure hunt and send their friends on a wild goose chase.
48	17	"Tiffani's Gold"	Patrick Maloney	Noah Taft	January 7, 1995	60253
With the national volleyball championships drawing near, Tiffani feels the pressure not only from her coach and teammates, but from the band too, who think that a star athlete could help boost their publicity. Desperate to succeed, she starts using steroids.

=== Season 4 (1995–96) ===
The cast for the fourth season of California Dreams was the same as the cast for the third season.

List of California Dreams season 4 episodes
No. overall	No. in season	Title	Directed by	Written by	Original release date	Prod. code
49	1	"Two Too Much"	Patrick Maloney	Tony Soltis	September 9, 1995	60272
Jake and Lorena decide that they don't have anything in common any more so end their relationship. Jake realizes that he and Tiffani still have feelings for each other. Meanwhile, Tony, Sly, and Mark take up ballet classes to get closer to women - but to his surprise, Tony ends up loving it and puts on a performance at Sharkey's.
50	2	"My Valentine"	Don Barnhart	Paul Lander	September 16, 1995	60276
As they get ready to celebrate their first Valentine's Day together, Tony and Sam realize that it may also be their last, since Sam will transfer back to Hong Kong at the end of the school year. Desperate to maintain their relationship they decide to get engaged - much to the concern of the rest of the gang.
51	3	"Principal Tiffani"	Don Barnhart	Todd J. Greenwald & Rob Hammersley	September 30, 1995	60280
During midterm week at school, Principal Blumford appoints Tiffani "Student Dean". Although she's not used to being in charge, or to the responsibilities of leadership, she soon thrives in this new position of power...but then the prestige goes to Tiffani's pretty head quicker than her bandmates can say "Jaime Escalante". Ultimately, when the students declare "Cut Day" to get out of taking their exams, Tiff discovers that tough-love and tough decisions often go hand-in-hand.
52	4	"The Dateless Game"	Don Barnhart	Ronald B. Solomon	October 7, 1995	60281
To help out Sly and Mark, Jake agrees to participate in a dating game for charity. But to his surprise, he actually wins, meaning he has to go out on a date with another girl. And as luck would have it, their date falls on the night of his anniversary dinner with Tiffani.
53	5	"Fallen Idol"	Don Barnhart	Noah Taft	October 14, 1995	60278
Jake finally gets to meet his idol, Zane Walker, when he comes to town. Zane is a musician that's having trouble writing a new song. Jake thinks that Zane might be the key to getting the band a record deal, so they finally get him to listen to their song. Zane ends up stealing the song from the band and making it a hit. Also, after getting an empty fortune cookie, Tony has a streak of bad luck.
54	6	"Defending Sly's Life"	Don Barnhart	Ronald B. Solomon	October 21, 1995	60284
Sly is put on trial by his friends for being a major creep, and is faced with several pieces of evidence that demonstrate his bad behavior.
55	7	"Secret Admirer"	Don Barnhart	Tony Soltis	November 4, 1995	60277
Sly feigns a romantic interest in a classmate so that she will agree to book the Dreams to play for her upcoming party. However, once feelings get involved, he realizes that his selfish agenda is not going to play out as easily as he expected. Meanwhile, Mark writes a love note to a girl he's crushing on, but when it falls into the wrong hands (repeatedly), it causes a lot of confusion and misplaced affection.
56	8	"Old"	Miguel Higuera	Ronald B. Solomon	November 11, 1995	60275
Sly is rude and makes fun of the "Senior Surfers". After having a dream that he is old, Sly decides to change his attitude toward the group.
57	9	"Operation Tony"	Miguel Higuera	Brett Dewey	November 18, 1995	60274
After Sly causes Tony to hurt his shoulder, Tony must have an operation to repair his shoulder. Tony's afraid of having the surgery and believes that he will die. Meanwhile, Lorena decides to become a candy-striper to get closer to Dr. Joe.
58	10	"Community Service"	Patrick Maloney	Ronald B. Solomon	November 25, 1995	61651
The gang gets involved in community service projects. Tony and Jake volunteer for Meals on Wheels, Mark cleans up the beach, Sam works for the blood drive, and Tiffany and Sly work at a teen help line. Sly is of course just doing the community service in order to meet girls but how will he react when he answers the call of a teen in need?
59	11	"Heal the Bay"	Patrick Maloney	Brett Dewey	December 2, 1995	60254
At first, Tony scoffs at Tiffani and Mark's concern for the environment after their favorite beach is shut down due to pollution. But after he realizes just how important an issue environmental awareness is, he not only joins their crusade, but goes overboard and becomes a nuisance to the rest of the gang.
60	12	"Woo-ops"	Patrick Maloney	Bonnie DeSouza	December 30, 1995	60273
Sam's father gives her a credit card to use in case of emergencies. Sam goes a little overboard and ends up reaching the limit of the credit card. When she can't pay her father back, he threatens to make her return home to Hong Kong. The gang has to try and help her raise enough money to pay off the debt.
61	13	"We'll Always Have Aspen"	Miguel Higuera	Ronald B. Solomon	January 6, 1996	60260
When Lorena's dad leaves her in charge of the ski lodge while he's away, she has Jake take over as the winter festival snow clown. Mark ends up running into his old girlfriend Jenny Stevens, who is an Olympic hopeful skier. She dumped him in order to try out for the United States National Ski Team. Meanwhile, Tony has a crush on a snow bunny.
62	14	"Lorena's Place"	Don Barnhart	Tony Soltis	March 30, 1996	60279
While her parents are away celebrating their anniversary, Lorena decides to hold a coffee house-style poetry reading in her loft in order to impress a new guy Alan who only seems interested in serious poets. But her deception goes too far when she loses the special poem her father wrote for her mother, and must find a way to replace it.
63	15	"Dancing Isn't Everything"	Don Barnhart	Brett Dewey	April 6, 1996	60282
Lorena is faced with a tough decision when her partner for Sharkey's dance contest is injured; either forfeit the competition, or accept Sly's offer to fill the spot. Meanwhile, Tony decides that he should be the leader of the Dreams instead of Jake.

=== Season 5 (1996) ===
The cast for the fifth season of California Dreams was the same as the cast for the third and fourth seasons.

List of California Dreams season 5 episodes
No. overall	No. in season	Title	Directed by	Written by	Original release date	Prod. code
64	1	"Stand by Your Man"	Patrick Maloney	Robert Jayson & Dawn Urbont	September 7, 1996	61653
Tiffani encourages Jake to get a job fixing motorcycles at a mechanic's shop, but Lorena and Sam plant worries in her head that he's cheating on her with his attractive female boss. Meanwhile, Sly and Tony try to catch Mark doing something embarrassing on video.
65	2	"Shaken, Rattled and Rolled"	Patrick Maloney	Brett Dewey	September 14, 1996	61652
When the Dreams experience an earthquake while practicing Tony is terrified. So terrified that when he tries to play the drums again he has flashbacks and runs off stage during an important audition and decides he wants to move to Ohio.
66	3	"Honest Sly"	Patrick Maloney	Brett Dewey	September 21, 1996	61658
Sly gets a job as a used car salesman and dupes Sam into buying a piece of junk. Sam ends up crashing the car and tries to get a refund. Meanwhile, Lorena agrees to pose as Mark's girlfriend to help him win over his crush, in exchange for his services as her lackey.
67	4	"Mop N' Pop"	Patrick Maloney	Keith Hosman	September 28, 1996	61655
A school-wide game leaves quite the mess for the new janitor, who happens to be Jake's dad. Though most of his friends don't see it as anything to be embarrassed about, Sly cracks one joke too many, causing Jake to react. Jake tries to get his dad to quit the job.
68	5	"Diss-Honored"	Patrick Maloney	Robert Jayson & Dawn Urbont	October 5, 1996	61656
Tony is plagued by guilt after he cheats on a midterm in order to join Sam in the Honor Society. Meanwhile, the rest of the gang enters a photography contest.
69	6	"Reel Teens"	Patrick Maloney	Ronald B. Solomon	October 12, 1996	61663
After a reality show chooses Jake and the band to follow around for a week, and witness how Jake deals with the stress of being overcommitted between the band, school, and his friends.
70	7	"Father Knows Bets"	Patrick Maloney	Tony Soltis	October 19, 1996	61657
Sly takes to gambling in order to make up for the attention he doesn't get from his workaholic father, but his habit quickly spirals out of control, much to the concern of his friends. Meanwhile, Tony joins the committee for choosing the recipients of the school's graduation awards.
71	8	"Letters from Woo"	Patrick Maloney	Noah Taft	October 25, 1996	60283
Flashbacks to some of the gang's more memorable exploits highlight a video that Sam sends to her uncle in China, showing him how special her American friends are.
72	9	"Senior Prom"	Patrick Maloney	Tony Soltis	November 2, 1996	61654
When Jake and Tiffani and Tony and Sam run for senior prom king and queen, things get heated and friendships are threatened as a bet makes things overly-competitive. Meanwhile, Mark is nervous about asking a girl to the prom.
73	10	"Babewatch"	Patrick Maloney	Paul Lander	November 9, 1996	60268
When Sam is cast in a small role on an episode of a popular TV series shooting on the beach, Tony gets jealous not only of her chance to be on TV, but because the script requires her to get cozy with her handsome costar. Meanwhile, Tiffani tries to teach Mark, Lorena, and Sly to act like surfers so that they might get cast as extras.
74	11	"Love Letters"	Patrick Maloney	Brett Dewey	November 16, 1996	61659
As the band work to make sure they have no regrets when they graduate, Sly sends secret admirer letters to Lorena, but is devastated when another man takes credit for them.
75	12	"Graduation Day"	Patrick Maloney	Robert Jayson & Dawn Urbont	November 22, 1996	61660
Mark drinks alcohol at a graduation party to make a girl like him, which has tragic consequences when he drives drunk. Meanwhile, Jake and Tiffani must complete a last-minute project to graduate while Tony helps Sam with her valedictorian speech.
76	13	"A Band Divided"	Patrick Maloney	Tony Soltis	November 30, 1996	61661
Lorena convinces the band to make her co-manager in exchange for a new amp. But, when she and Sly clash, the future of the band may be in jeopardy. Meanwhile, Jake, Tony, and Mark try to rewire the loft to accommodate the new amp.
77	14	"The Fashion Man"	Kevin Charles Sullivan	Renee Palyo	December 7, 1996	60262
Sly is jealous of the attention the famous model Samson gets from girls, so he gets involved with a shady modelling agency hoping to become more attractive, leaving the band to convince him he's being taken advantage of.
78	15	"The Last Gig"	Patrick Maloney	Ronald B. Solomon	December 14, 1996	61662
While the rest of the band are planning their future after graduation, Jake is trying hard to get a record contract, he manages to get a deal for the whole band but is shocked when they decline as they're ready to move on. They're able to persuade Jake to take the deal. The band plays their final gig and say their goodbyes.
