= Cody Longo =

American actor and musician

- Born: Cody Anthony Longo; March 4, 1988; Littleton, Colorado, U.S.
- Died: February 8, 2023 (aged 34); Austin, Texas, U.S.
- Occupations: Actor, musician, model, music producer
- Years active: 2006–2023
- Spouse: Stephanie Clark
- Children: 3

Cody Anthony Longo (March 4, 1988 – February 8, 2023) was an American actor and musician from Denver, Colorado. He was known for his leading role as Eddie Duran in the 2012 Nickelodeon mini series Hollywood Heights, and playing Nicholas Alamain in Days of our Lives. In 2012, he released his first single, launching his music career as a solo artist.

== Early life ==
Longo was born and raised in Littleton, Colorado, a suburb of Denver. Having musicians and artists in his family, Longo taught himself how to play the piano at a young age. He started his acting career at a young age, performing and studying theater. Longo played Danny in Grease and Mercutio in Romeo and Juliet at the Denver Performing Arts Academy.

After graduating high school, Longo moved to Los Angeles, California, to pursue acting, where he also continued to study both theater and psychology.

== Career ==
In 2006, Longo appeared in the straight to video Hip Hop Kidz: It's a Beautiful Thing as Eddie, a dancer. The next year, he played Dave in the movie Ball Don't Lie, which stars Chris "Ludacris" Bridges and Nick Cannon. Longo made an appearance in the television show Medium before the summer release of Bring It On: Fight to the Finish (the fifth installment of the Bring It On franchise), playing Evan. That fall, Longo was in the highly anticipated movie Fame, a loosely based remake of the 1980 film of the same name.

In December 2009, Longo began his six episode guest appearance on the ABC Family television show Make It or Break It as gymnast Nicky Russo. Longo became friends with co-stars Nico Tortorella and Johnny Pacar, and, within the next year, he and Pacar started a band named Forever The Day. Their first EP Under The Afterglow was released on August 16, 2010, and they later played shows in and around the Los Angeles area.

In 2010, Longo replaced Joe Jonas as Young Tommy Walker in the TV series Brothers & Sisters, alongside his Fame co-star Kay Panabaker. Longo also appeared in the independent movie High School, alongside Colin Hanks, Adrien Brody, and Michael Chiklis. The movie premiered at the Sundance Film Festival in January 2010. He appeared in the film Piranha 3D, based on the original movie.

In 2011, Longo starred in the TV movie Lovelives as Aaron. He appeared on CSI: Crime Scene Investigation, followed by a couple of appearances on CSI: NY as Tyler Josephson. He acted in eight episodes of the soap opera Days of Our Lives, playing Nicholas Alamain.

In 2012, Forever The Day released their second EP Letters of Letting Go on February 13. Longo starred alongside Toby Hemingway and Frances Fisher in the psychological thriller The Silent Thief, playing Mike Henderson. Next, Longo played Young Izek in For The Love of Money. That summer, Longo starred in the Nick at Nite drama series Hollywood Heights as superstar Eddie Duran. The show had one season of 80 episodes.

Longo parted ways with Forever The Day and signed with Mirrorball Entertainment. His debut single "Atmosphere" was released on August 22, 2012, reaching third position on the iTunes Pop Charts and entering the Top 100 Billboard Emerging Artist charts in 2013. He released his next single "Falling Into You" on December 4, 2012. "She Said" was released on February 26, 2013, charting number three on iTunes Top 100. The same month, Longo traveled to his home state of Colorado to promote his next movie, Not Today, ahead of its release in theaters that spring. He starred as Caden Welles. Longo then continued to focus on his music, releasing "Electric" and later appearing on Kit Fysto's single "I'm Not Playing Games".

Longo moved to Nashville, Tennessee, to continue to work on his music. He released a remix of his song "Falling Into You", featuring B-Nice, in 2014 and his single "What Up Tho" on June 23, 2015. Longo played Alex Francis in Promoted.

In 2016, Longo played Jack Rivers in Drop It. He also appeared in two episodes of the ABC/CMT television show Nashville as Quentin. Next, he appeared on the ABC show The Catch as Todd Walker, then as Charlie Peterson on ABC's Secrets and Lies. Longo starred opposite James Maslow in 48 Hours to Live (formerly called Wild for the Night) as Liam. The movie Wildflower was released, in which Longo plays Josh. He wrote the song, "Change", that Christian artist Shane Selby performed on the film's soundtrack. Longo also released two singles, "Scream" and "'Til Tomorrow" in 2016.

In 2017, Rich Boy, Rich Girl was released. Longo plays Andy Palazzo. Co-star C. Thomas Howell said that "Cody and I had a real chemistry that translates on film. It's light and fun yet poignant. The same energy the movie holds". Longo also starred opposite Burt Reynolds, Chevy Chase, Ariel Winter, and Nikki Blonsky in The Last Movie Star, playing Ted.

B. Harrison Smith's Death House was released in select theaters in March 2018. Longo stars as Agent Jae Novak. On May 11, Longo released his single "Loud," which surpassed 60,000 streams on Spotify.

== Philanthropy ==
Longo worked with charities and campaigned to keep art programs in schools domestically, and to continue to help build housings that provide schooling for children around the world. He headed his own non-profit, LiveAlive, and was heavily involved with the Make-A-Wish Foundation and Pencils of Promise.

== Personal life and death ==
Longo dated actress Cassie Scerbo from 2009 to 2010.

Longo and his wife, Stephanie Clark, had three children aged 7, 5 and 1 years old at the time of his death.

In 2020, Longo was arrested on a domestic assault charge, and the following year he pleaded guilty to misdemeanor assault in relation to an accusation of sexual assault on a minor.

Longo was found dead at his home in Austin, Texas, on February 8, 2023, at the age of 34. A representative told The New York Times that the suspected cause was alcohol poisoning; Longo had struggled with alcoholism for some years prior to his death.

== Filmography ==
=== Film ===
Year	Title	Role	Notes
2008	Ball Don't Lie	Dave	
2009	Bring It On: Fight to the Finish	Evan	
2009	Fame	Andy Matthews	
2010	High School	Chad	
2010	Piranha 3D	Todd Dupree	
2011	For the Love of Money	Young Isaac	
2013	Not Today	Caden Welles	
2014	Wildflower	Josh	
2015	Promoted	Alex Francis	
2017	The Last Movie Star	Tad	
2018	Death House	Agent Jae Novak	
2019	Starting Up Love	Max	
2024	Do You Want to Die in Indio?	Lucky	

=== Television ===
Year	Title	Role	Notes
2009	Medium	Gavin Coley	Episode: Apocalypse... Now?
2009	Make It or Break It	Nicky Russo	6 episodes
2009	Three Rivers	Blair	Episode: Code Green
2010	Brothers & Sisters	Young Tommy Walker	Episode: Time After Time - Part 1
2011	CSI:NY	Tyler Josephson	Episode: Identity Crisis
2011	CSI: Crime Scene Investigation	Nathan Culver	Episode: Unleashed
2011	Days of Our Lives	Nicholas Alamain	8 episodes
2012	Hollywood Heights	Eddie Duran	78 episodes
2016	Nashville	Quentin	2 episodes
2016	The Catch	Todd Walker	Episode: The Benefactor
2016	Secrets and Lies	Charlie Peterson	2 episodes
