= Jean Carol =

American actress

- Born: Hillsdale, New Jersey, U.S.
- Occupation: Television actress
- Years active: 1988–present

Jean Carol is an American actress.

== Early life ==
Carol was born in Hillsdale, New Jersey. She acted in New York theatrical productions as a child. When she was 11, her family relocated to Miami. She graduated from Florida State University, where she studied theater and broadcasting.

== Career ==
In the early 1980s, Carol hosted a public affairs program on WESH in Orlando and later she hosted and produced PM Magazine in Orlando and San Diego.

Carol's most high-profile acting role was as Nadine Cooper in the daytime drama Guiding Light. She joined the show in 1988 and quickly became a popular comic foil. At the 1990 Soap Opera Digest Awards she was awarded Outstanding Female Newcomer. Her stint on the show lasted for seven years until the character of Nadine was murdered by Brent Lawrence. She returned to Guiding Light for one special episode on Mother's Day 2006.

Among Carol's other appearances are roles on Sunset Beach, Monk, Six Feet Under, and Arli$$. She also appeared in the 1989 horror comedy Speak of the Devil and the 2015 sex comedy Promoted.

In 2016 Carol joined the digital series Misguided and made her debut as Jeva Jones in February 2017 during the second season of the series.

== Filmography ==
=== Film ===
Year	Title	Role	Notes
1989	Vice Academy	Queen Bee	
1989	Hot Times at Montclair High	Mrs. Willis	
1989	Speak of the Devil	Isabelle Johnson	
1990	Payback	Donna Nathan	
1998	Frog and Wombat	Holly Mason	
1998	Last Night	Mrs. Burbank	
1999	Love	News Reporter	
1999	Killing the Vision	Casting Director	
2000	Speed Bump	Mrs. Morgan	
2000	Tail Sting	Flight Attendant Patti	
2001	Vanilla Sky	Woman Nearby	Uncredited
2001	Heart of Stone	Sheila Mason	
2001	Don't Make Me Blush	Karen's Mom	
2002	The Killing Point	Dr. Collins	Direct-to-video
2003	The Singing Forest	Emily	
2003	Crisis Line	Mildred	Direct-to-video
2007	Americanizing Shelley	Martha	
2007	Cougar Club	Cougar	Uncredited
2007	Dark Mirror	Real Estate Agent	
2009	Stellina Blue	Waitress	
2012	Argo	Jordan's Secretary	
2015	Promoted	Eliza Fox	
2015	Broken: A Musical	Nancy	
2017	Complete or Repeat	Francine	
2018	Guy	Connie	
2019	The Devil Has a Name	Judge's Secretary Susan	

=== Television ===
Year	Title	Role	Notes
1988–95, 2003, 2006	Guiding Light	Nadine Cooper / Nadine Lewis	88 episodes
1997	Arliss	Penny	Episode: "What Arliss Hath Joined Together"
1999	Sunset Beach	Florence Kennedy	Episode #1.515
1999	A Memory in My Heart	Donna	Television film
2000	After Diff'rent Strokes: When the Laughter Stopped	News Anchor	Television film
2000	Titans	Docent	Episode: "Dysfunction Junction"
2001	Unsolved Mysteries	Mrs. Karl Rehberg	Episode: "French Fry Fraud"
2002–03	Ocean Ave.	Catherine Devon	Main cast
2004	Six Feet Under	Wife #5	Episode: "The Dare"
2005	McBride: It's Murder, Madam	Female Newscaster	Television film
2005	Monk	Aunt Madge	Episode: "Mr. Monk Goes to a Wedding"
2006	Crumbs	Woman #2	Episode: "Friends in High Places"
2007	The 1/2 Hour News Hour	Hillary Clinton	Episode: "Town Hall: Identity Politics"
2007	Side Order of Life	Ian's Mom	Episode: "Funeral for a Phone"
2011	Working Class	Customer	Episode: "Hire Education"
2011	A Series of Unfortunate People	Barbara	Episode: "Mother's Day"
2011	The Mentalist	Wealthy Woman	Episode: "Rhapsody in Red"
2017–19	Misguided	Tamara / Jeva Jones	8 episodes
