= Beverly Polcyn =

American actress (1927–2018)

- Born: September 13, 1927; Los Angeles, California, U.S.
- Died: September 7, 2018 (aged 90); Winnetka, California, U.S.
- Occupation: Actress
- Years active: 1988–2018

Beverly Polcyn (September 13, 1927 – September 7, 2018) was an American actress.

She appeared in "Mama's Girls", a 1988 episode of the TV series Mama's Family, as one of senior tap dancing ladies.

Poclyn's first film appearance was in the 1991 horror film Speak of the Devil where she played Ettie Glittens. She is mainly recognized for her appearance in Not Another Teen Movie, which resulted in a 2002 MTV Movie Awards "Best Kiss" nomination, along with Mia Kirshner. Additional roles include Date Movie where she plays the Old Cat Woman. In 2006, Polcyn appeared in an episode of Scrubs playing the part of a dyslexic woman.

== Filmography ==
- Speak of the Devil
- Hook
- The Beverly Hillbillies
- Out to Sea
- Not Another Teen Movie
- The Sweetest Thing
- Malcolm in the Middle
- Monk
- Scrubs
- Date Movie
- Boppin' at the Glue Factory
- National Lampoon's Totally Baked: A Potumentary
- Austin & Ally
- Walk of Fame
- Bucky Larson: Born to Be a Star
- Airplane Mode
- Fred 3: Camp Fred
