= Speak of the Devil (1989 film) =

Speak Of The Devil
- VHS Cover Art
- Directed by: Raphael Nussbaum
- Written by: Wally K. Berns (story), Robert Earl Craft (screenplay), Raphael Nussbaum (screenplay)
- Produced by: Richard F. Brophy; Raphael Nussbaum; Henning Schellerup; Ruben Veloso
- Starring: Thomas McGowan; Jean Carol; Bernice Tamara Goor; Walter Kay
- Cinematography: Chuck Colwell
- Edited by: Stephen Adrianson; John Santos
- Music by: Gill Bottcher
- Distributed by: Action International Pictures
- Release date: 1989
- Running time: 99 minutes
- Country: United States
- Language: English

Speak of the Devil is a 1989 American horror comedy film produced and directed by Raphael Nussbaum from a story by Wally K. Berns. It was also released under the name The Ungodly.

In the film, a phony preacher and faith healer flees from the police in Louisiana. He and his greedy wife settle in a derelict house in Los Angeles, initially unaware that it is haunted by demons. The wife establishes a Church of Latter Day Sin (LDS) and starts collaborating with the demons, while her increasingly disturbed husband tries to stop her.

== Plot ==
Reverend Jonah Johnson is a phony Louisiana Evangelist preacher, whose wife, Isabelle, uses his sermons to fleece their parishioners of their money. During his first satellite feed on TV, he pretends to "heal" a man in wheelchair as a man from the IRS watches, but he is soon interrupted by the police with a warrant for his arrest and a redneck father declaring he is the father of his daughter's unborn baby. Johnson flees the scene, also chased by the actor who played the phony paraplegic, and is soon caught by a local police officer, who lets him go. His arrest would upset the officer's widowed mother, a loyal Johnson supporter.

Johnson and his wife flee to Los Angeles where they discover a derelict boarded-up house and start to rebuild their phony church. As they are buying the house from their realtor Mrs. Wigglesworth, the realtor's son, Bobby, tries to tell them about a cult who murdered a young girl in the house but is shushed up by his mother.

Their first night in the house, the Johnsons encounter a possessed toilet with smoke coming out of it and a gang of "punkers" hiding drugs in the house, who are scared away by Steve Seligman, a police officer. Johnson also has dreams of the demonic little girl. The next day they hire Mexicans to clean up and restore the house, one of whom is abducted and killed by a demon living in the house, his screams covered up by a power saw.

The lady realtor soon returns to reveal to Jonah that his check bounced, since the IRS froze his bank accounts. The IRS agent from Louisiana returns, having tracked down the fugitive. Broke and needing money, the Johnson's encounter a mysterious woman, Lady Caligari, who gives them a briefcase filled with cash. Rabbi Ben Tov, who lives next door warns them from accepting it, but Isabelle sends him away.

Isabelle also gets a book of evil and in time starts getting more beautiful. She decides to use the book to open a Church of Latter Day Sin with the motto, "Sin today without guilt," but Jonah prefers to stay loyal to God. They are rejoined by old cohort, Mort, and Jonah's innocent niece, Eve. Meanwhile, the punkers resolve to get their house back and crash the Johnson's first church gathering which includes the realtor and her son. During the gathering, the demon in the basement appears, urinates on the pulpit and escapes through the window from Jonah. Before it departs, it grants the punkers wish that the police harassing them at the park get killed, Mort the ability to see the future and Isabelle continued money, fortune and power. Jonah meanwhile is getting increasingly disillusioned with Isabelle's direction with his church, unaware that the Devil has asked for his soul from Isabelle.

The next day, the punkers encounter the cops at the park that have been harassing them and watch as they die in a crash with a garbage truck that crushes them. After Maggot, their female member, gets the larger bust size she had wished for, they realize they are getting what they want and join Isabelle's church. Eve meanwhile has visions of the demonic girl and the devil in the house. As Jonah keeps having doubts, Isabelle keeps stringing him along to keep him in control.

By now, the church has started having ritual sacrifices of chickens and goats, and Isabelle uses Mort's visions of the stock market to further her wealth. She also hears of a display of museum artifacts involving devil worship and Count Dracula and has the punkers steal them for her own collection. They're traced to the church by Officer Seligman, who becomes smitten with Eve. He tries to arrest them, but Mort reports a phony terrorist report and has to let them go. That night, the gathering at the church with the relics culminates with an orgy and the death of one of the punkers who impales himself on one of the artifacts.

After the young man's death, Jonah starts fearing the price for all the blasphemy and wants to quit and turn himself to the police. He tries getting guidance from the other local ministry, but none of them are of any help. He turns to Rabbi Ben Tov, who tells him only an act of self-sacrifice will cleanse his spirit. The Devil by now orders Isabelle to sacrifice Eve to break Jonah's spirit. Eve also runs into Officer Seligman, who spots her wearing one of the stolen relics. He turns to Rabbi Ben Tov, his old mentor, for guidance, knowing that without a search warrant, he can't investigate the church. When the Rabbi tries to exorcise the house with his shofar, he gets distracted by Maggot and gets killed by the demon. When it also threatens Eve, Mort doses her with chloroform for her sacrifice.

That night, Bobby, the realtor's son, discovers Eve and hides her in the closet to save her life. His mom gets confused before the sacrifice as the punkers look for Eve and take her from Billy. Maggot brings Officer Seligman to the house as Jonah refuses to sacrifice Eve, even with Mort ordering him. He conjures up the Devil himself to force Jonah's hand, but Jonah impales himself and the Devil standing behind him with a sword. A fire erupts as Seligman saves Eve using his mentor's lost shofar and the house burns down after demons drag Isabelle and Mort to Hell. The third of a string of plumbers show up to try fixing the cursed toilet.

The next morning, Jonah emerges alive from the house which still has the cursed toilet having survived unscathed. Having found God, Jonah resumes his ministry even as the Southern cop who let him escape Louisiana disputes him. Watching him on TV, the officer's elderly mother (Beverly Polcyn), however, punches her son after Jonah heals her arthritis.

== Cast ==
- Thomas McGowan (as Robert Elarton) as Jonah Johnson
- Jean Carol (as Jean Miller) as Isabelle Johnson
- Bernice Tamara Goor as Eve
- Walter Kay as Mort
- Shawn Patrick Greenfield as Bobby Wigglesworth
- Louise Sherrill as Mrs. Wigglesworth
- Richard Rifkin as Rabbi Ben Tov
- Mark Conner as Rivit the IRS Man
- David Campbell as Glittens
- Beverly Polcyn as Ettie Glittens
- Dennis de Boisblanc as Steve Seligman
- Tyler Bowe (as Tyler V. Bowe) as Slash
- Max Chain as Puker
- Suzan Ellen as Maggot
- Troy Fromin as Burn

== Production ==
The film was made in locations in Los Angeles, California. It "introduced" actor Shawn Patrick Greenfield and included the song "You Better Be Ready/The Ballad of Jonah Johnson."

== Home video ==
The film was released on VHS videocassette in 1991 through Action International Pictures, but it is now out of production. In France, the film was released as "Aux Portes de L'enfer."

== Reception ==
Horror guru and author of "Creature Features - The Science Fiction, Fantasy and Horror Movie Guide," John Stanley comments that the script "is all over the place in sub-plots." It has zero ratings at Rotten Tomatoes.
