= Estelle Harris =

American actress (1928–2022)

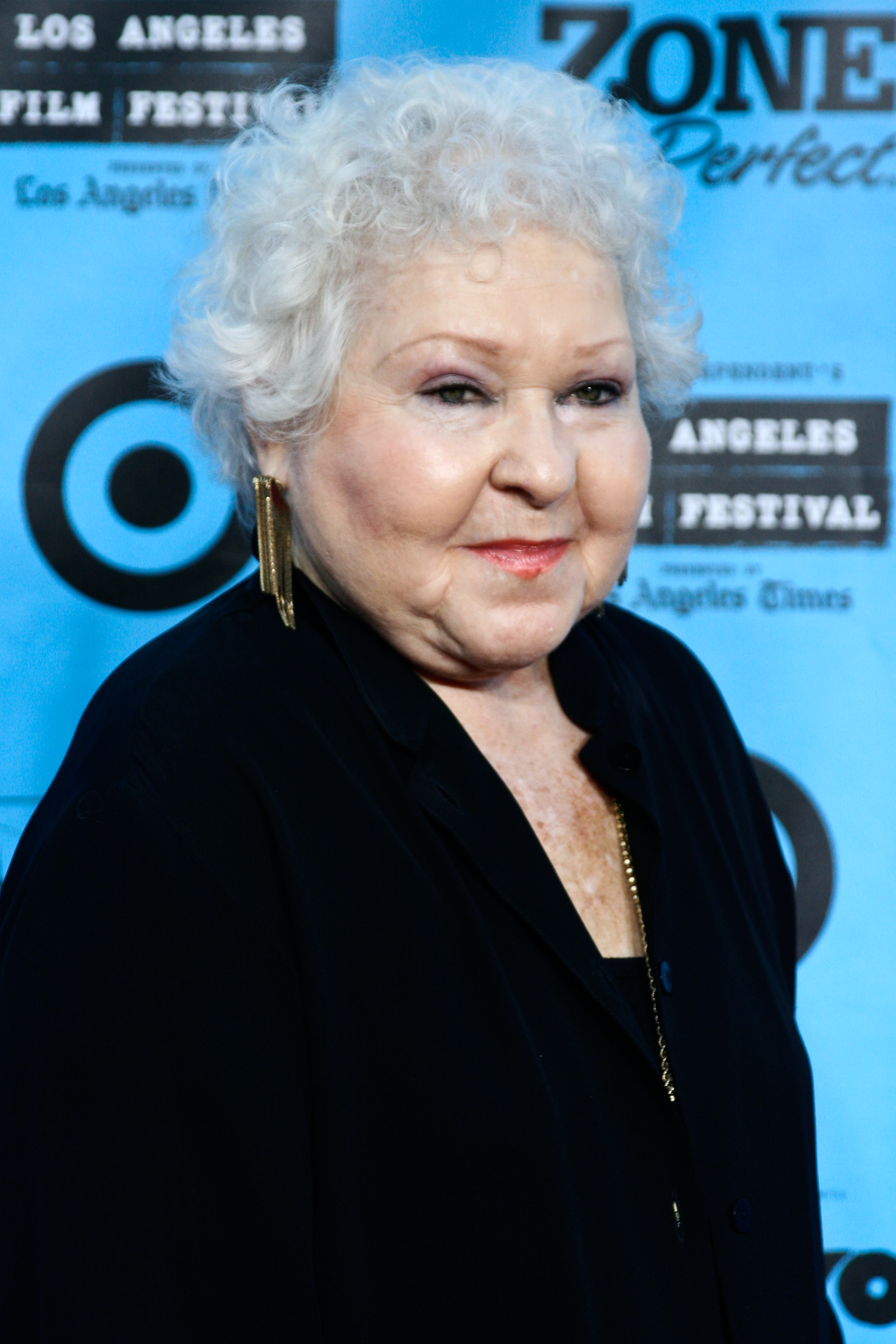
- Harris in 2009
- Born: Estelle Nussbaum; April 22, 1928; New York City, United States
- Died: April 2, 2022 (aged 93); Palm Desert, California, United States
- Occupations: Actress; comedian
- Years active: 1976–2019
- Spouse: Sy Harris (m. 1953; died 2021)
- Children: 3

Estelle Harris (née Nussbaum; April 22, 1928 – April 2, 2022) was an American actress and comedian, known for her exaggeratedly shrill voice. She was best known for her role as Estelle Costanza on Seinfeld. Her other roles included the voice of Mrs. Potato Head in the Toy Story franchise, Muriel in The Suite Life of Zack & Cody, and Mama Gunda in Tarzan II. During her career, Harris starred in various television commercials.

== Early life and education ==
Harris was born Estelle Nussbaum in the Hell's Kitchen neighborhood of Manhattan, New York on April 22, 1928, the younger of two daughters of Isaac ('Ira') and Anna Nussbaum, Polish-Jewish immigrants who owned a candy store and soda shop. In 1935, when Harris was seven years old, the family relocated to Tarentum, Pennsylvania. She graduated from Tarentum High School. For many years, her date of birth was mistakenly cited as April 4, 1928. The correct date was not revealed until after her death.

== Career ==
Harris began her career in amateur productions and in dinner theater before moving on to regional theaters and summer stock productions across the country.

After her children were grown, she found success on Madison Avenue, appearing in 25 national television commercials. In one commercial, she energetically sang the praises of Handi-Wrap II.

In 1977, Harris began her long format acting career in the film Looking Up about three generations of a working-class Jewish family in New York City. She became widely known for her supporting role as Estelle Costanza on Seinfeld. "She is the mother that everybody loves, even though she's a pain in the neck," Harris told the Pittsburgh Post-Gazette in 1998. Despite her iconic role, she was highly reclusive.

In Star Trek: Voyager, she appeared in the third-season episode "Sacred Ground", which aired on October 20, 1996. She played a small role as Bridget in Out to Sea (1997).

In Toy Story 2 (1999), she provided the voice of Mrs. Potato Head and would continue to reprise the role for the franchise. In 2005, she lent her voice to Mama Gunda in Tarzan II. In The Suite Life of Zack & Cody, Harris had a recurring role as Muriel. In 2007, she appeared in Brad Paisley's music video for the song "Online." Harris reprised her role of Mrs. Potato Head in Toy Story 3 (2010) and Toy Story 4 (2019), the latter of which was her final film role. She portrayed Bertha Kristal, the mother of CBGB founder Hilly Kristal, in CBGB (2013).

Her other voice work included Lula in Dave the Barbarian, Mama Lipsky in Kim Possible, Thelma in The Proud Family, Mrs. Turtle in Mickey Mouse Works and House of Mouse, Death's mother in Family Guy, the Old Lady Bear in Brother Bear (2003), and Audrey in Home on the Range (2004). She also provided the voice of Marty's wife in the American Dad! episode "In Country...Club." She appeared in Promoted (2015) as Sylvia Silver.

She retired from acting in 2015, only briefly returning to reprise the role of Mrs. Potato Head in Toy Story 4 (2019), which was her final film role.

== Personal life and death ==
In 1952, after moving back to New York, Harris met window treatment salesman Sy Harris at a dance. They married six months later. They had two sons, Eric (b. 1957) and Glen (b. 1962), and a daughter Taryn (b. 1964). Eric is a social worker, Glen is a music promoter who doubled as his mother's unofficial manager, and Taryn is a former Nassau County police officer retired on disability. Harris also had three grandsons and one great-grandson. Once her children started school, Harris pursued acting roles, first in amateur productions, then dinner theatre and commercials.

On September 20, 2001, Sy and Estelle were in a traffic accident when their car blew a tire and flipped twice, but they managed to escape serious injuries. Sy Harris died on January 11, 2021, predeceasing his wife by one year.

On April 2, 2022, Harris died of natural causes at her home in Palm Desert, California, at the age of 93 twenty days before her 94th birthday.

== Filmography ==
=== Film ===
Year	Title	Role	Notes
1984	Once Upon a Time in America	Thelma	
1988	Stand and Deliver	Jackie Harris	
1992	This Is My Life	Aunt Harriet	
1995	Perfect Alibi	Aunt Dorothy	
1995	The West Side Waltz	Estelle	
1997	Out to Sea	Bridget	
1998	Chairman of the Board	Ms. Dawn Krubavitch	
1998	The Odd Couple II	Peaches	
1998	My Giant	Aunt Pearl	
1999	Lost & Found	Mrs. Donna Stubblefield	
1999	Toy Story 2	Mrs. Potato Head	Voice
2000	What's Cooking?	Aunt Bea	
2000	Dancing in September	Sally	
2000	Playing Mona Lisa	Aunt Velva	
2001	Good Advice	Iris	
2003	Brother Bear	Old Lady Bear	Voice
2004	Home on the Range	Audrey	Voice
2004	Teacher's Pet	June Boogin	Voice
2005	Tarzan II	Mama Gunda	Voice, direct-to-video
2006	Queer Duck: The Movie	Catherina Duckstein	Voice
2007	The Grand	Ruth Melvin	
2010	Toy Story 3	Mrs. Potato Head	Voice
2010	Movin' In	Arlene Taylor	
2011	Hawaiian Vacation	Mrs. Potato Head	Voice, short film
2011	Small Fry	Mrs. Potato Head	Voice, short film
2012	Partysaurus Rex	Mrs. Potato Head	Voice, short film
2013	CBGB	Bertha Kristal	
2015	Promoted	Sylvia Silver	
2019	Toy Story 4	Mrs. Potato Head	Voice, final film role

=== Television ===
Year(s)	Title	Role	Notes
1985–1986	Night Court	Easy Mary	3 episodes
1987	Married... with Children	Delilah	Episode: "Al Loses His Cherry"
1990	Mathnet	Agnes	Episode: "The Case of the Swami Scam"
1991	Brooklyn Bridge	Esther Shapiro	Episode: "When Irish Eyes Are Smiling"
1992	Law & Order	Mrs. Lynn Rachlin	Episode: "Intolerance"
1992	Mad About You	Mother Thelma	Episode: "Sofa's Choice"
1992–1998	Seinfeld	Estelle Costanza	27 episodes
1993	Good Advice	Ronnie Cohen	5 episodes
1995	Chicago Hope	Thelma Johnson (uncredited)	Episode: "Heartbreak"
1995	Aladdin	Additional voices	Episode: "While the City Snoozes"
1995	Timon & Pumbaa	Timon's Mother	Voice, episode: "Mombasa-In-Law"
1995	In the House	Mrs. Claus	Episode: "Christmas Story"
1996	Night Stand with Dick Dietrick	Mary the Real Mother	Episode: "Dick Goes Home"
1996	The Mask: Animated Series	Lt. Kellaway's Mother	Voice, episode: "The Mother of All Hoods"
1996	The Tick	Ruth	Voice, episode: "The Tick vs. Dot and Neil's Wedding"
1996	Star Trek: Voyager	Old Woman	Episode: "Sacred Ground"
1997	Moesha	Frances Howie	Episode: "Break a Leg"
1997	Living Single	Esther Brooks	Episode: "Back in the Day"
1997	Cybill	Woman	Episode: "From Boca, with Love"
1998	Addams Family Reunion	Great-grandmother Delilah Addams	Television film
1998	Hercules	Phil's Mother	Voice, episode: "Hercules and the King for a Day"
1998	The Wild Thornberrys	Iguana/Turtle	Voice, episode: "Eliza-cology"
1998	Godzilla: The Series	Old Lady/Receptionist	Voice, episode: "What Dreams May Come"
1998	The Rosie O'Donnell Show	Herself	
1999	The Brothers Flub	Additional voices	16 episodes
1999	Sunset Beach	Margaret Raynor	3 episodes
1999	The Parkers	Miss Agnes	Episode: "Scammed Straight"
1999–2000	Mickey Mouse Works	Mrs. Tammy Turtle	Voice, 4 episodes
2000	Providence	Darlene	Episode: "Syd in Wonderland"
2000	72nd Academy Awards	Mrs. Potato Head	Voice, television special
2000	Queer Duck	Mrs. Catherina Duckstein	Voice, 5 episodes
2001	Sabrina, the Teenage Witch	Dora	Episode: "Sabrina, the Muse"
2001	The Kids from Room 402	Aunt Cookie	Voice, episode: "Uncle Bonehead"
2001	Family Guy	Death's Mother	Voice, episode: "Death Lives"
2002	House of Mouse	Mrs. Tammy Turtle	Voice, 4 episodes
2002	Weakest Link	Herself	1 episode
2002	Whammy! The All-New Press Your Luck	Herself	1 episode
2003	Half & Half	Grandma Sophie	Episode: "The Big Phat Mouth Episode: Part 2"
2003	Regular Joe	Aunt Mickie	Episode: "Boobysitting"
2003	The Proud Family	Helga	Voice, episode: "Thelma and Luis"
2003	Test the Nation	Herself	1 episode
2004	Kim Possible	Mama Lipsky	Voice, 3 episodes
2004	As Told by Ginger	Myrna	Voice, episode: "The Wedding Frame"
2004	Kramer vs. Kramer: Kenny to Cosmo	Herself	
2004–2005	Dave the Barbarian	Lula	Voice, 21 episodes
2005	Tripping the Rift	Estelle	Voice, episode: "Roswell"
2005	Phil of the Future	Older Pim	Episode: "Maybe-Sitting"
2005–2008	The Suite Life of Zack & Cody	Muriel	14 episodes
2006	Mind of Mencia	Herself	1 episode
2006	ER	Dawn Markovic	Episode: "Bloodline"
2007	iCarly	Lydia Halberstadt	Episode: "iScream on Halloween"
2007	The Emperor's New School	Irma Mudka	Voice, episode: "Mudka's Secret Recipe"
2007	Case Closed	Madame	Television film
2008	Can You Teach My Alligator Manners?	Nana	Voice, episode: "Nana's Visit"
2009	American Dad!	Marty's Wife	Voice, episode: "In Country... Club"
2009	Curb Your Enthusiasm	Estelle Costanza / Herself	Episode: "The Table Read"
2009–2010	Made in Hollywood	Herself	2 episodes
2009–2014	Fanboy & Chum Chum	Oz's Mother	Voice, 11 episodes
2010	Sonny with a Chance	Grace Gallagher	Episode: "Random Acts of Disrespect"
2010	The Bonnie Hunt Show	Herself	1 episode
2010	KTLA Morning News	Herself	1 episode
2010	Totally Tracked Down	Herself	1 episode
2011	The Looney Tunes Show	Sylvester's Mother	Voice, episode: "Point, Laser Point"
2012	Futurama	Velma Farnsworth	Voice, episode: "Near-Death Wish"
2013	The Exes	Mother	Episode: "Zero Dark Forties"
2014–2015	Jake and the Never Land Pirates	Peg-Leg Peg	Voice, 3 episodes

=== Video game ===
Year	Title	Voice	Notes
1999	Toy Story 2: Buzz Lightyear to the Rescue	Mrs. Potato Head	Film Cutscene Footage

== Theatre ==
Year	Title	Role	Notes
1976, 1979	Funny Girl	Mrs. Strakosh	Dayton Memorial Hall
1977	Fiddler on the Roof	Yente	Dayton Memorial Hall
1979	Funny Girl	Mrs. Strakosh	An Evening Dinner Theatre
1982–1983	The Desert Song	Susan	Darien Dinner Theatre
1995	Annie Warbucks	Commissioner Harriet Doyle	Frauenthal Center for the Performing Arts
