= Sacred Ground (Star Trek: Voyager) =

- Star Trek: Voyager episode
- Episode no.: Season 3 Episode 7
- Directed by: Robert Duncan McNeill
- Story by: Geo Cameron
- Teleplay by: Lisa Klink
- Production code: 143
- Original air date: October 30, 1996

Guest appearances
- Becky Ann Baker - Guide; Estelle Harris - Old Woman; Parley Baer - Old Man #1; Keene Curtis - Old Man #2; Harry Groener - Magistrate

Episode chronology
← Previous "Remember"	Next → "Future's End"
- Star Trek: Voyager season 3

"Sacred Ground" is the 49th episode of Star Trek: Voyager, the seventh episode of the third season. In this episode a crew member of the star ship Voyager is injured by an energy field in an alien temple.

This science fiction television episode, part of the Star Trek franchise, was broadcast on UPN on October 30, 1996.

This episode was directed by Robert Duncan McNeill, who also plays the character Tom Paris; he ultimately directed four episodes of the series.

== Plot ==
The crew take shore leave on a friendly planet inhabited by people called Nechani. A group become interested in the Nechani's religious sites and take a tour. Kes is put into a coma when, out of curiosity, she touches a natural biogenic field. The Doctor cannot help, in part because the monks will not allow readings to be taken around the field. Neelix investigates and returns with a story of a King and his son. The son was seemingly injured as Kes was and the King went through an initiation in order to awaken him.

Janeway petitions the monks to allow her to perform the same ritual. The Doctor places a probe in her bloodstream, determined to find out the science behind the rituals. Janeway expects the course to consist of tests of physical endurance, mental discipline, and perhaps psychoactive drugs which would change her body chemistry, allowing her to pass through the field.

Janeway goes through the first series of tests; her guide warns that they are meaningless, the point is for Janeway to get in touch with the spirits. She ends up bitten by a creature which is supposed to allow her to contact the spirit world. Her guide says that the spirits find Janeway's inquiries about Kes' plight inconsequential because she already knows how to fix Kes.

The Doctor thinks the venom from the creature might be the cure needed for Kes, but this does not prove correct. Janeway convinces her command crew to let her go to the ritual site again, convinced that if she takes Kes through the field, it will work. Her guide allows it, indicating that Janeway's desire to go through is all that is needed. Kes is healed of her affliction. The Doctor comes up with a scientific explanation for how Kes was healed. Janeway seemingly expresses doubt that it was science.

== Production ==
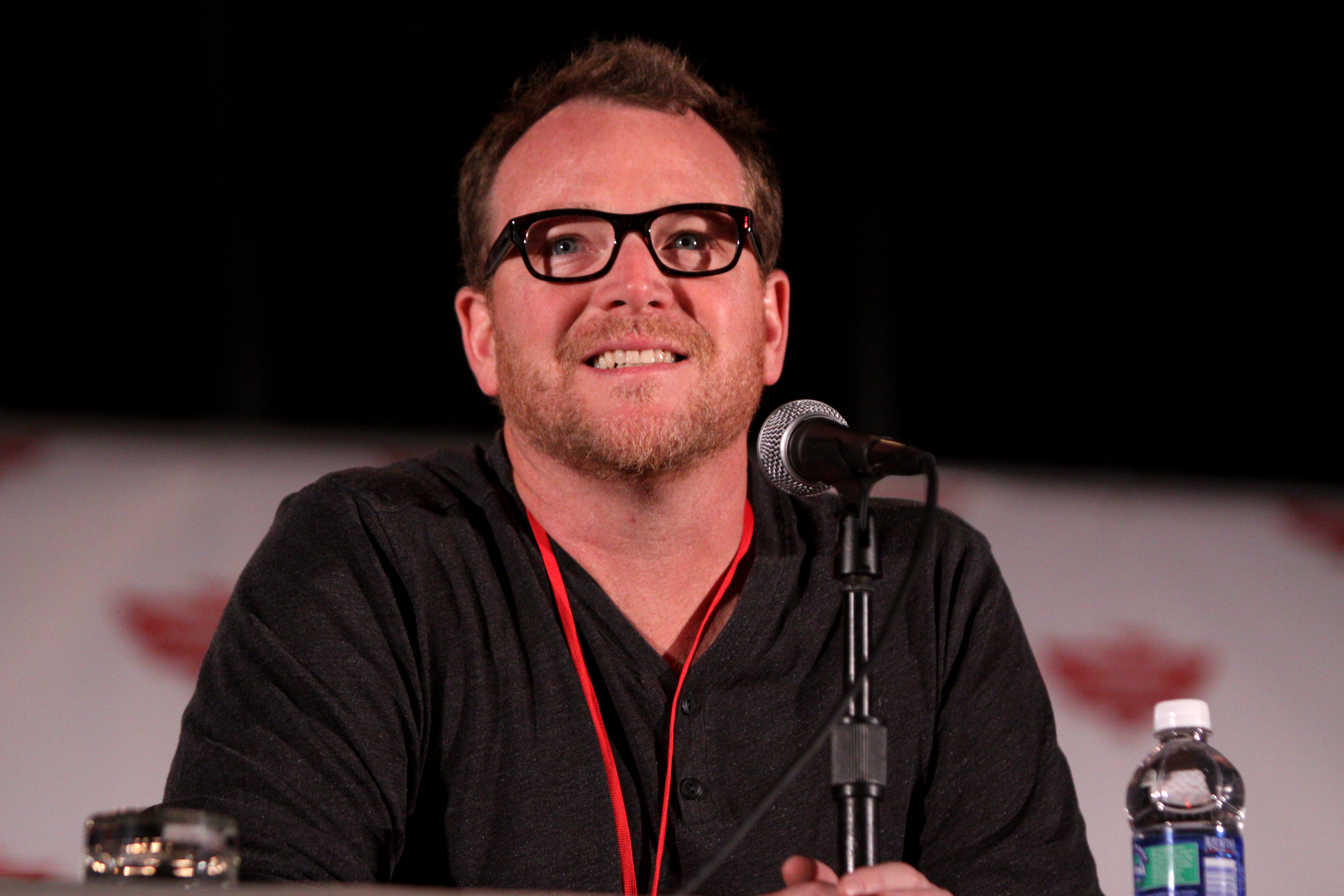
Star Trek: Voyager actor Robert Duncan McNeill directed his first episode.

The episode was one of four episodes that was shot during the second season of production, but held over and aired in the third season. The other episodes are "Basics, Part II," "Flashback," and "False Profits." The story concept for the episode was a submission from freelance writer Geo Cameron about forcing Janeway to deal with things beyond the scientific method. The teleplay was written by Lisa Klink, who said it was "one of the harder scripts that I've ever written" because the episode was very talky and philosophical, and you have to pay attention to keep up with what was going on. She was very pleased with how the script came out and thought the director "did a very nice job with it as well."

Actor Robert Duncan McNeill, who played Tom Paris was given his first chance to direct on this episode. McNeill said "I was excited. I was ready. I was terrified." Duncan directed three more episodes of Voyager and four episodes of Enterprise; after the series he went on to direct as a career.

== Reception ==
This had Nielsen ratings of 4.6 when it was broadcast in 1996.

In 2020, ScreenRant ranked this episode as one of the top ten worst episodes of Star Trek: Voyager.

Tor.com rated the episode 1 out of 10.

== Releases ==
"Sacred Ground" was released on LaserDisc in Japan on June 25, 1999, as part of the 3rd season vol.1 set.

This episode was released on DVD on July 6, 2004 as part of Star Trek Voyager: Complete Third Season, with Dolby 5.1 surround audio. The season 3 DVD was released in the UK on September 6, 2004.

In 2017, the complete Star Trek: Voyager television series was released in a DVD box set, which included it as part of the season 3 discs.
