= The Singing Forest =

- Directed by: Jorge Ameer
- Written by: Jorge Ameer
- Produced by: Jorge Ameer
- Starring: Jon Sherrin; Erin Leigh Price; Craig Pinkston
- Cinematography: Gary Tachell
- Edited by: Lawrence Benedict; L. Black
- Music by: José J. Herring
- Production company: A.J. Productions
- Distributed by: Hollywood Independents
- Release dates: October 12, 2003 (OutFLIX); November 14, 2003 (New York)
- Running time: 72 minutes
- Country: United States
- Language: English

The Singing Forest is a 2003 American romantic fantasy film written, produced and directed by Jorge Ameer, and starring Jon Sherrin, Erin Leigh Price and Craig Pinkston. The film received negative reviews.

== Plot ==
Christopher is a widower after his wife of 22 years, Savannah, dies. He begins drinking and becomes obsessed with the theory of past lives. Before long, he is convinced he is actually the reincarnation of a German resistance fighter (Jo) who was hanged by the Nazis for hiding Jews during The Holocaust. His situation becomes even more complex as his daughter Destiny's wedding approaches, and Christopher's sense of déjà vu around her fiancé, Ben, is enough to convince him that he and Ben were gay lovers during a past life. As Christopher becomes increasingly disturbed and goes about seducing his daughter's future husband, he begins to reveal the strange, violent path his life had taken well before his wife died.

Ben gives in to Christopher's seduction and eventually visits Christopher's psychic to confirm he really was Jo's lover Alexander in a past life. Destiny discovers their affair and eventually gives them her blessing. In the end, she gives her father away at the church wedding that was originally supposed to be hers. The psychic reveals that Destiny had never really existed. Instead, she had been the spirit of a miscarriage Savannah had after she was raped. The spirit had always been destined to bring Christopher (Jo) and Ben (Alexander) back together in their present lives.

== Cast ==
- John Sherrin as Christopher
  - David Guzzone as young Christopher
- Erin Leigh Price as Destiny
- Craig Pinkston as Ben / Alexander
- Eric Morris as Jo
- Shelley Price as Savannah
- Jorge Ameer as Charlie
- Lance Black as Bill
- Sal Roman as Stephen
- Toni Zobel as psychic
- Marc Ambrose as Nazi guard
- Randal Craig as Nazi guard
- Nolo Ortiz as Nazi guard
- Justin Huddleston as Nazi guard
- Gregory Saites as Nazi guard
- Emre Ozpirincci as Holocaust victim
- Skyler Thomas as Holocaust victim
- Lisa Marx as television guest
- Renae Plant as television host
- Louis Perez as pastor
- Jean Carol as Emily
- Gerry Rand as Fred
- Colin Campbell as Heinz

== Production ==
The film was written and conceived in Turin, Milan, Florence and Rome (all in Italy). The Torino Film Festival advised and assisted the producers in the making of the film.

Many of the minor film roles were performed by members of the production crew. For example, Louis Perez (the pastor) accounted for grip / electric. Sal Roman (Stephen), too, is credited as grip. Dustin Lance Black is credited as L. Black for his editing and as Lance Black for his acting role (Bill). He is mentioned for the third time within the special thanks section of the credits. Renea Plant (television host) was art director and Gregory Saites (Nazi guard #4) was stunt coordinator to the film.

Keith Holland was first assistant cinematographer and Sam Tyler Wayman is credited as first assistant director. Smitty Smith was boom operator / swing for the film. Andy Sowerwine was sound mixer. Still photography was done by Alistaire. Make up was done by Julia Santana and Christine Edwards. Wedding wardrobe was provided by Maria Roybal and B'B's Tuxido, the filming equipment was available by Ultravision Hollywood. Jon Jacobs was casting consultant.

The music partly consists of classical pieces performed by Jose Herring:

- Creation
- Adagio
- Piano Sonata No. 5 (Beethoven)
- Moonlight Sonata – Piano Sonata No. 14 (Beethoven)

The soundtrack also includes several modern songs:

- Crazy People, Crazy World (composed and produced by Earthman and Judy Gray)
- L'impossibile vivere (produced by Renato Serio, Maurizio Fabrizio, and Claudio Guidetti)

The original Holocaust photographs shown in the film were taken from the 1960 German educational documentary film The Yellow Star: The Persecution of the Jews in Europe 1933-45 (orig. Der gelbe Stern – Die Judenverfolgung 1933–1945) by Gerhard Schoenberner.

== Reception ==
On the review aggregator website Rotten Tomatoes, 0% of nine critics' reviews are positive. Metacritic, which uses a weighted average, assigned the film a score of 1 out of 100, based on seven critics, indicating "overwhelming dislike". It is on Metacritic's list of the worst reviewed films of all-time.

Reviewing the film in The New York Times, Stephen Holden wrote, "The Singing Forest was written and directed by Jorge Ameer, whose film Strippers opened three years ago and remained the single worst movie I had ever reviewed — until now."

== See also ==
- List of films considered the worst
