= Scissor Seven =

Chinese manhua and television series

- Also known as: Killer 7 Assassin Wu Liuqi Chinese: 刺客伍六七 (season 1); Wu Liuqi: The Strongest Hairstylist Chinese: 伍六七之最强发型师 (season 2); Wu Liuqi: Xuanwu Kingdom Chapter Chinese: 伍六七之玄武国篇 (season 3); Wu Liuqi: Shadow Destiny Chinese: 伍六七之暗影宿命 (season 4); Wu Liuqi: Memory Fragments Chinese: 伍六七之记忆碎片 (season 5)
- Genre: Wuxia, comedy, Action
- Created by: He Xiaofeng
- Written by: Various
- Directed by: He Xiaofeng
- Voices of: He Xiaofeng; Duan Yixuan
- Composers: Hou Lei; Hou Junjie; Cheung Ka Shing Alan; Wang Qiuyu (season 4)
- Country of origin: China
- Original languages: Mandarin; Cantonese
- No. of seasons: 5
- No. of episodes: 50 + 4 specials

Production
- Producers: Zhu Jing (season 1); Aiken Zou (seasons 2–5)
- Animator: Sharefun Studio
- Editors: He Xiaofeng; Various (season 5)
- Running time: 13–20 minutes
- Production companies: Sharefun Studio; AHA Entertainment; Nurostar

Original release
- Network: Bilibili; Tencent Video; Youku (seasons 1; 3–4) iQIYI (seasons 1; 4)
- Release: April 25, 2018 – present

Scissor Seven
- Chinese: 刺客伍六七
Transcriptions
Standard Mandarin
- Hanyu Pinyin: Cìkè Wǔliùqī

Scissor Seven, also known as Killer Seven (Chinese: 刺客伍六七, Cìkè Wuliùqi), is a Chinese manhua series created by He Xiaofeng, serialized on the website Tencent Dongman between 2016 and 2017. It was followed by a donghua series, which premiered on April 25, 2018 and is primarily released on Bilibili and Tencent Video. The fourth season premiered on January 18, 2023. A film sequel to the series' fourth season was announced at the end of the season's final episode. The teaser trailer of the fifth season was posted on April 25, 2024. The fifth season premiered in China on October 2, 2024. A prequel manhua series, Scissor Seven: Black and White Twin Dragons, has been published on Tencent Dongman and Manga Bilibili since 2021. Outside of China, Scissor Seven debuted worldwide on Netflix in 2020. The series also received a nomination in the TV Film category at the 2018 Annecy International Animated Film Festival.

== Synopsis ==
=== Plot ===
The clumsy and broke Seven attempts to become a professional killer and opens a barber shop on Chicken Island as a front, initially unaware he is already an infamous (amnesiac) professional killer.

== Characters ==
Seven / Wu Liuqi (伍六七, Wǔliùqī)
Voiced by: He Xiaofeng (Mandarin, Cantonese); Ronny Chieng (English, seasons 1-4); Daniel J. Kim (English, season 5)
The protagonist of the series, also known commonly as Seven, is a barber on Chicken Island with amnesia. His real identity before the memory loss is one of the seven powerful shadow assassins of the Xuanwu Kingdom. Ji Dabao takes him into his care after he loses his memory. He is ranked 17369th in the assassin list, though his real ability is far more powerful than the current rank he obtains. He is able to manipulate a pair of his scissors, which he uses as a weapon. He has an oddly romantic relationship with Plum Blossom Thirteen. He always wears a white hoodie, in which is written the initial for Seven (motive to his name).

Thirteen / Plum Blossom Thirteen (梅花十三, Méihuā shísān)
Voiced by: Duan Yixuan (Mandarin); Jennie Kwan (English)
The unnamed youngest daughter of Plum Blossom Master. She has a strained relationship with her father, as her mother divorces from him due to his obsession with having a son, her dad having only thirteen daughters prior to bringing a new wife and his first son. She loses her mother due to a murder, before a hired assassin (who is later revealed as Qing Feng) comes to avenge her mother, causing Thirteen to seek Qing Feng for training and has vowed to defeat all men, be it her father or else. She is tasked in murdering Seven and bringing in the legendary sword, but her attempts tend to be disrupted with comical reasons, including a moment of kissing. However, Seven is the only person who does not care about her past and treats her like a normal girl, which emotionally changes her heart, and she harbours her feelings toward Seven since. Toward the end of the second season, she is one of the people to realise Seven's true identity.

Ji Dabao (鸡大保, Jī dà bǎo)
Voiced by: Jiang Guangtao, Yu Haowei (Mandarin); Jas Patrick (English)
The manager of Wu Liuqi's barber shop, and also the person who saved Wu Liuqi's life two years ago. Although having a chicken-like appearance, he is in fact, a very powerful person, capable of transforming into anything if this is useful for his assassination task, usually given to Wu Liuqi instead. He has previously killed King Pheasant, who murders his friend, before freeing himself from the farm life and becomes an independent person.

Ji Xiaofei (鸡小飞, Jī xiǎo fēi)
Voiced by: Zhao Han (Mandarin); Jill Bartlett (English)
Dabao's adopted son. A mixed hybrid between his late father and an unnamed pigeon, he is often around with his adoptive father.

== Reception ==
=== Awards ===
Year	Ceremony	Category	Result	Ref.
2018	2018 Annecy International Animated Film Festival	TV Films	Nominated	

=== Critical reception ===
Jonathon Wilson of Ready Steady Cut gave the first season a score of 3.5/5.

== Episodes ==
=== Series overview ===
Season	Episodes	Originally released	
Season	Episodes	First released	Last released
1	14	April 25, 2018	June 20, 2018
2	10	October 23, 2019	January 1, 2020
3	10	January 27, 2021	May 5, 2021
4	10	January 18, 2023	March 15, 2023
5	10	October 2, 2024	November 20, 2024

=== Season 1 (2018) ===
No. overall	No. in season	Title	Directed by	Written by	Original release date	Netflix release date
1	1	"Kill Bad Guys, Earn Good Money" (Chinese: 杀坏人赚大钱)	He Xiaofeng	He Xiaofeng	April 24, 2018	January 10, 2020
Cash-strapped Seven flunks a crash course in professional killing and opens a hair salon as a cover. First assignment: cut off a bride's hair.
2	2	"Stab Your Dog Eyes Blind" (Chinese: 刺瞎你的狗眼)	He Xiaofeng	He Xiaofeng	April 24, 2018	January 10, 2020
Meow, the Chief of Cats, hires Seven to wipe out an old flame. But after hearing a star-crossed interspecies love story, he attempts to make peace.
3	3	"Seven VS Thirteen" (Chinese: 六七VS十三)	He Xiaofeng	He Xiaofeng	May 1, 2018	January 10, 2020
It's scissors versus sword as Seven faces off against Thirteen. He's no match for his deft opponent — so he transforms into half a durian.
4	4	"Killing Underpants Man" (Chinese: 刺杀内裤男)	He Xiaofeng	He Xiaofeng	May 8, 2018	January 10, 2020
The Island Purity Society summons Seven to kill an underwear collector, but Seven encourages everyone to embrace their differences.
5	5	"Killing a Domineering Grannie" (Chinese: 刺杀最强阿婆)	He Xiaofeng	He Xiaofeng	May 15, 2018	January 10, 2020
Seven shape-shifts into a cardboard box and contends with a stabby, swindling fruit vendor whose grandson got a bad haircut from Seven's shears.
6	6	"Assassinate a Pretty Girl" (Chinese: 刺杀美少女)	He Xiaofeng	He Xiaofeng	May 22, 2018	January 10, 2020
Cola, Seven's next target, enlists his help in checking off a bucket list of mischievous deeds, but the client who hired Seven has a secret.
7	7	"Killing Captain Jack" (Chinese: 刺杀杰克船长)	He Xiaofeng	He Xiaofeng	May 29, 2018	January 10, 2020
On behalf of the underfunded coast guard, Seven agrees to kill the captain of a submarine that's threatening the island.
8	8	"Bodyguard Dachun" (Chinese: 保镖大春)	He Xiaofeng	He Xiaofeng	June 5, 2018	January 10, 2020
Hired by a woman to “cut off his [her husbands] little friend” if he’s with another woman, Seven confronts — and bonds with — impervious bodyguard He Dachun, who makes a heartrending sacrifice.
9	9	"Crisis on the Island" (Chinese: 小岛危机)	He Xiaofeng	He Xiaofeng	June 12, 2018	January 10, 2020
Seven teams up with islanders to stop the Prince of Stan from extracting an energy rock and destroying the island, but Stan's technology is too robust.
10	10	"Thousand Demon Daggers" (Chinese: 魔刀千刃)	He Xiaofeng	He Xiaofeng	June 19, 2018	January 10, 2020
Thirteen comes to Seven's aid in a heated clash with the Prince of Stan. Seven recalls his past as a prominent figure of Xuanwu.
OVA–1	11	"Thirteen" (Chinese: 梅花十三)	He Xiaofeng	He Xiaofeng	August 1, 2018	January 10, 2020
Thirteen's past comes to light: as the Plum Blossom Swordsman's estranged daughter, she joined the world of killers after a tragic incident.
OVA–2	12	"King of Chicken pt. 1" (Chinese: 鸡中霸王（上）)	He Xiaofeng	He Xiaofeng	August 8, 2018	January 10, 2020
Da Bao reflects on Da Fei, who once faced King Pheasant in a fight so that his son Xiao Fei could become a fighter chicken instead of a dinner chicken.
OVA–3	13	"King of Chicken pt. 2" (Chinese: 鸡中霸王（中）)	He Xiaofeng	He Xiaofeng	August 15, 2018	January 10, 2020
Seeking to avenge his friend, Da Bao throws his hat in the ring for a fight against King Pheasant, but in his current state he's going to need a boost.
OVA–4	14	"King of Chicken pt. 3" (Chinese: 鸡中霸王（下）)	He Xiaofeng	He Xiaofeng	August 22, 2018	January 10, 2020
Determined to teach humans a lesson, Da Bao gives King Pheasant a taste of his own medicine and liberates the chickens from their coops.

=== Season 2 (2019) ===
No. overall	No. in season	Title	Directed by	Written by	Original release date	Netflix release date
11	1	"Super Scissors" (Chinese: 最强发型师)	He Xiaofeng	He Xiaofeng	October 22, 2019	May 7, 2020
He Dachun enlists Seven's help defeating a group of assassins newly arrived on the island. A tin of hair wax saves the day.
12	2	"Thirteen VS Seven" (Chinese: 十三VS六七)	He Xiaofeng	He Xiaofeng	October 22, 2019	May 7, 2020
Thirteen seeks to deliver on her promise and destroy Seven, but she must first overcome an assassin's worst enemy — emotion.
13	3	"Protecting Mad Bark" (Chinese: 保护汪疯)	He Xiaofeng	He Xiaofeng	October 29, 2019	May 7, 2020
Mad Bark is outplayed by a new killer: a guitar-strumming dog whose acoustic "Magical Sound of Sadness" strikes a lethal chord.
14	4	"The Stan Trip" (Chinese: 斯特国一日游)	He Xiaofeng	He Xiaofeng	November 5, 2019	May 7, 2020
With Seven's hands tied by an invisible lizard assassin, Cola convinces the Prince of Stan to take her to Stan.
15	5	"Again, We Meet Captain Jack" (Chinese: 杰克船长第二回合)	He Xiaofeng	He Xiaofeng	November 12, 2019	May 7, 2020
Captain Jack returns to settle scores with Seven, who summons the powers of the Thousand Demon Daggers.
16	6	"Revenge of King Pheasant" (Chinese: 山鸡王的复仇)	He Xiaofeng	He Xiaofeng	December 3, 2019	May 7, 2020
King Pheasant, now a special soldier for Stan, kidnaps Seven and Xiao Fei and sets out to kill Da Bao, but a ghost from the past returns.
17	7	"Plum Blossom Eleven" (Chinese: 梅花十一)	He Xiaofeng	He Xiaofeng	December 10, 2019	May 7, 2020
Seven prepares for a date with Thirteen. When he falls for a trap, he finds a way out of the bind by channeling his tonsorial qi.
18	8	"Two Heroes" (Chinese: 双雄)	He Xiaofeng	He Xiaofeng	December 17, 2019	May 7, 2020
Back in the past, Seven joins the Shadow Killers, faces off against Redtooth and sets out in search of the Thousand Demon Daggers.
19	9	"Redtooth" (Chinese: 赤牙)	He Xiaofeng	He Xiaofeng	December 24, 2019	May 7, 2020
Redtooth arrives on the Island to confront Chairman Jiang, who activates the powerful White Lily Blossom with Seven's help.
20	10	"Fate" (Chinese: 宿命)	He Xiaofeng	He Xiaofeng	December 31, 2019	May 7, 2020
Seven reconnects with his old self, but to defeat the Blood Demon, he must harness the power of Xuanwu martial arts — and the barber within.

=== Season 3 (2021) ===
No. overall	No. in season	Title	Directed by	Written by	Original release date	Netflix release date
21	1	"Goodbye" (Chinese: 告別)	He Xiaofeng; Chen Jiajie	He Xiaofeng	January 27, 2021	Jan 10, 2021
Seven's real identity has been exposed, the town sees him differently. He needs to return to Xuanwu to take the chief's head.
22	2	"Dai Bo & Seven" (Chinese: 阿鸡与阿七)	He Xiaofeng	He Xiaofeng; Jiang Huiqin	January 27, 2021	Jan 27, 2021
Da Bao sets out with Xiao Fei in search of Seven and recalls how Seven once bent over backwards to help him find an antidote.
23	3	"Excuse me, is this the Xuanwu Country?" (Chinese: 请问，这里是玄武国吗？)	He Xiaofeng; Shi Bibang	He Xiaofeng	February 3, 2021	Feb 3, 2021
Seven came to Dali Nation, known for its beautiful people - but an overlord with dark mirror magic has turned everyone ugly.
24	4	"Tenderness of a Tough Man" (Chinese: 铁汉柔情)	He Xiaofeng; Chen Jiajie; Xu Nihua	He Xiaofeng	February 10, 2021	Feb 10, 2021
Eleven hires Dachun to be her bodyguard in the treacherous land of Xuanwu.
25	5	"Rock Hard Country" (Chinese: 石更国)	He Xiaofeng; Chen Jiajie; Xu Nihua	He Xiaofeng	February 17, 2021	Feb 17, 2021
Seven arrives at He Dachun's hometown, where he must win a pentathlon against the muscular Coach Chen to save Xiao Fei from being eaten.
26	6	"Superpower Country" (Chinese: 异能国)	He Xiaofeng; Shi Bibang; Chen Shihao	He Xiaofeng	April 7, 2021	Apr 7, 2021
In Superpower Country, Seven encounters Pingan, a boy with mind control powers; a battle with the Prince of Stern erupts.
27	7	"Sneaking into Xuanwu Country" (Chinese: 潜入玄武国)	He Xiaofeng; Chen Jiajie; Yang Zeqing	He Xiaofeng	April 14, 2021	Apr 14, 2021
As Cola's life hangs by a thread, Seven sneaks into Xuanwu with Da Bao and Xiao Fei to find the medicine to cure her.
28	8	"Master Green Phoenix's Scheme" (Chinese: 青凤的阴谋)	He Xiaofeng; Chen Jiajie	He Xiaofeng	April 21, 2021	Apr 21, 2021
Seven faces the powerful Eyeless Sorcerer and undergoes a transformation in Xuanwu; Thirteen struggles to choose a side.
29	9	"Memories that You Don't Want to Forget Even in Pain" (Chinese: 再痛苦也不想忘掉的记忆)	He Xiaofeng; Chen Jiajie	He Xiaofeng	April 28, 2021	Apr 28, 2021
Seven fends off Xuanwu assassins while under the influence of the blade's powers, as memories of life on Chicken Island begin to fade.
30	10	"Who Is the One You Want to Protect" (Chinese: 你是我想保护的人)	He Xiaofeng	He Xiaofeng	May 5, 2021	May 5, 2021
Shadow assassin Manjusaka confronts Seven; in a true test of her powers, Thirteen engages in a heated clash with Blackbird.

=== Season 4 (2023) ===
No. overall	No. in season	Title	Directed by	Written by	Original release date	Netflix release date
31	1	"The "Immortal" Black Bird" (Chinese: 不死黑鸟)	He Xiaofeng	He Xiaofeng	January 18, 2023	September 21, 2023
To rescue Thirteen, Seven confronts Blackbird in a heated battle as a secret history of the Flying Bird Sect resurfaces.
32	2	"Assassinating the Leader" (Chinese: 刺杀首领)	He Xiaofeng; Chen Jiajie	He Xiaofeng	January 18, 2023	September 21, 2023
Green Phoenix arrives at the Shadow Assassin's headquarters, where he seizes an opportunity to execute a long-awaited plan of revenge.
33	3	"Saving Seven" (Chinese: 营救阿七)	He Xiaofeng; Hou Junjie	He Xiaofeng	January 25, 2023	September 21, 2023
Dai Bo overcomes a series of hurdles to locate Seven, who is now a target of multiple powerful Shadow assassins.
34	4	"Overnight at the Store" (Chinese: 便利店一夜)	He Xiaofeng; Gong Yanshan	Gong Yanshan	February 1, 2023	September 21, 2023
In a convenience store on Chicken Island, Seven's friend Ordinary Assassin confronts an armed robber. But things do not go as planned.
35	5	"Crisis on the Island 2" (Chinese: 小岛危机2)	He Xiaofeng	He Xiaofeng	February 8, 2023	September 21, 2023
With the arrival of White Fox, a new threat suddenly looms over Chicken Island. As Seven regains consciousness, he receives an intimidating phone call.
36	6	"Huilian's Past" (Chinese: 惠莲往事)	He Xiaofeng; Xu Nihua	He Xiaofeng	February 15, 2023	September 21, 2023
In order to save a loved one, Chairman Jiang embarks on a journey to the Heaven Lily Sect, where she and Quan crossed paths a long time ago.
37	7	"Red Tooth's past" (Chinese: 赤牙往事)	He Xiaofeng; Chen Jiajie	He Xiaofeng	February 22, 2023	September 21, 2023
Decades after the tragic downfall of the Heaven Lily Sect, Chairman Jiang must confront her former lover, who's been possessed by a demon.
38	8	"The Decision" (Chinese: 抉择)	He Xiaofeng	He Xiaofeng	March 1, 2023	September 21, 2023
While the cats and dogs of Chicken Island prepare for an attack against White Fox, Seven finds himself battling three different poisons in his body.
39	9	"Showdown on the Chicken Island" (Chinese: 决战小鸡岛)	He Xiaofeng; Chen Jiajie; Shi Bibang	He Xiaofeng	March 8, 2023	September 21, 2023
Upon arriving at Chicken Island, Prince of Stan and Cola struggle to defeat the powerful White Fox - but unexpected help is on the way.
40	10	"Green Phoenix's Revenge" (Chinese: 青凤的复仇)	He Xiaofeng; Chen Jiajie; Jiang Huiqin	He Xiaofeng	March 15, 2023	September 21, 2023
Green Phoenix confronts his own fears in an effort to challenge a formidable foe. But with Thirteen held captive, he has a tough choice to make.

=== Season 5 (2024) ===
Release date: 2 October 2024 (China).

No. overall	No. in season	Title	Directed by	Written by	Original release date
41	1	"Seven's Special Mission / Archie's Special Mission" (Chinese: 阿七的特别任务)	Chen Jiajie	He Xiaofeng	October 2, 2024
42	2	"Returning to Xuanwu Kingdom" (Chinese: 重返玄武国)	Xu Nihua	He Xiaofeng	October 2, 2024
43	3	"Acting Director of Chick Island" (Chinese: 小鸡岛代理主任)	Chen Jiajie	He Xiaofeng	October 9, 2024
44	4	"Zan Fist Showdown" (Chinese: 赞拳对决)	–	He Xiaofeng	October 16, 2024
45	5	"Nine-Fingered Qin Demo" (Chinese: 九指琴魔)	–	He Xiaofeng	October 23, 2024
46	6	"Bravely barging into Plum Blossom Mountain Villa" (Chinese: 勇敢地闯入梅花山庄)	–	He Xiaofeng	October 30, 2024
47	7	"Reunion" (Chinese: 团圆)	–	He Xiaofeng	November 6, 2024
48	8	"Prison Break" (Chinese: 越狱)	–	He Xiaofeng	November 13, 2024
49	9	"Prophecy of the Eyeless Sorcerer" (Chinese: 无眼巫师的预言)	–	He Xiaofeng	November 13, 2024
50	10	"Battle of Black Rock Mountain" (Chinese: 黑岩山之战)	–	He Xiaofeng	November 20, 2024

== Follow-ups ==
=== Prequel manhua ===
A prequel manhua series, Scissor Seven: Black and White Twin Dragons, has been published on Tencent Dongman since 2021 across two volumes, written by Hei Bai Shuang Long and published by AHA Entertainment, and focusing on the adventures of two best friends, Bai Qi and Mo Lang.

=== Sequel film ===
A film sequel to the series was announced at the end of the fourth season's final episode.
