= California Dreams =

American television sitcom (1992–1996)

- Genre: Teen sitcom
- Created by: Brett Dewey; Ronald B. Solomon
- Starring: Brent Gore; Kelly Packard; William James Jones; Heidi Noelle Lenhart; Michael Cade; Michael Cutt; Gail Ramsey; Ryan O'Neill; Jay Anthony Franke; Jennie Kwan; Diana Uribe; Aaron Jackson
- Theme music composer: Guy Moon; Steve Tyrell; Regina Crimp
- Opening theme: "California Dreams"
- Ending theme: "California Dreams" (instrumental)
- Composer: Steve Tyrell
- Country of origin: United States
- Original language: English
- No. of seasons: 5
- No. of episodes: 78 (list of episodes)

Production
- Executive producer: Peter Engel
- Producers: Franco Bario; Ronald B. Solomon; Brett Dewey; Noah Taft
- Camera setup: Multi-camera
- Running time: 22–24 minutes
- Production companies: Peter Engel Productions; NBC Productions

Original release
- Network: NBC
- Release: September 12, 1992 – December 14, 1996

California Dreams is an American teen sitcom that aired on NBC. It was part of the network's Saturday morning block, TNBC, premiering on September 12, 1992. Created by writers Brett Dewey and Ronald B. Solomon, and executive produced by Peter Engel, all known for their work on Saved by the Bell, the series centers on the friendships of a group of teenagers who form the fictional titular band. The series ran five seasons, airing its final episode on December 14, 1996. The series featured 40 original songs performed by the band throughout the show's run, primarily written by Steve Tyrell.

== Episodes ==
Season	Episodes	Originally released	
Season	Episodes	First released	Last released
1	13	September 12, 1992	December 5, 1992
2	18	September 11, 1993	February 5, 1994
3	17	September 10, 1994	January 7, 1995
4	15	September 9, 1995	April 6, 1996
5	15	September 7, 1996	December 14, 1996

== Cast ==
- Brent Gore as Matt Garrison (seasons 1–2), founding member of the band, main songwriter, singer, guitarist, and keyboard player, eventually moves away with family
- Kelly Packard as Tiffani Anne Smith, bass player and singer
- William James Jones as Antoine Bethesda "Tony" Wicks, drummer and singer
- Heidi Noelle Lenhart as Jenny Garrison (season 1 & first 3 episodes of season 2), Matt's sister, singer and keyboard player, eventually leaves to attend a music conservatory in Italy
- Michael Cade as Sylvester Leslie "Sly" Winkle, the band's incompetent manager
- Michael Cutt as Richard Garrison (season 1; recurring season 2), Matt and Jenny's father
- Gail Ramsey as Melody Garrison (season 1; guest season 2), Matt and Jenny's mother
- Ryan O'Neill as Dennis Garrison (season 1), Matt and Jenny's younger brother
- Jay Anthony Franke as Jacob Samuel "Jake" Sommers (seasons 2–5), lead guitarist, singing voice performed by Barry Coffing
- Jennie Kwan as Samantha "Sam" Woo Deswanchoo (seasons 2–5), a foreign exchange student from Hong Kong, replaces Jenny as singer and keyboard player
- Diana Uribe as Lorena Costa (seasons 3–5), the privileged daughter of a wealthy family who takes Sam into their home after the Garrisons' departure
- Aaron Jackson as Mark Winkle (seasons 3–5), Sly's cousin from New York City, keyboard player, guitarist, drummer, and bass player, singing voice performed by Zachary Throne

== Syndication ==
Reruns of California Dreams briefly aired on TBS in the late 1990s.

The show aired on Channel 4 and The Children's Channel and later Trouble in the UK in the 1990s.

== Home media ==
Shout! Factory released the first four seasons of California Dreams on DVD in Region 1 between 2009 and 2011. Seasons 3 and 4 were released as Shout! Factory Exclusives titles, available exclusively through their online store. As of 2016, Seasons 1-4 and The Best of... DVDs can be purchased on Amazon. It is unknown if season 5 will be released.

On July 19, 2011, Mill Creek Entertainment released a ten-episode best-of set, The Best of California Dreams, a single-disc set that features episodes from the first three seasons.

DVD name	Ep #	Release date
Seasons 1 & 2	31	March 31, 2009
Season 3♦	17	May 18, 2010
Season 4♦	15	January 18, 2011

♦ - Shout! Factory Exclusives title, sold exclusively through Shout's online store

== Reception ==
=== Critical response ===
California Dreams was not well received critically. Rebecca Ascher-Walsh of Entertainment Weekly gave the series a grade of "F", and stated that "California Dreams can be accused of a lot of things, but originality isn’t one of them", and added that "California Dreams producer Franco E. Bario (who is also behind Saved by the Bell) may have good intentions, but it’s hard to imagine what they were." Los Angeles Times reviewer Lynne Heffley considered the show nothing more than "a Saved by the Bell clone set in an upscale beach town".

=== Awards and nominations ===
Year	Award	Result	Category	Recipient
1993	Young Artist Awards	Nominated	Outstanding Young Ensemble Cast in a Youth Series or Variety Show	Michael Cade, Brent Gore, William James Jones, Heidi Lenhart and Kelly Packard
1993	Young Artist Awards	Nominated	Best Young Actress in a New Television Series	Heidi Lenhart
1993	Young Artist Awards	Nominated	Best Young Actor in an Off-Primetime Series	Ryan O'Neill
1994	Young Artist Awards	Nominated	Outstanding Youth Ensemble in a Cable or Off Primetime Series	Michael Cade, Jay Anthony Franke, Brent Gore, William James Jones, Kelly Packard, and Ryan O'Neill
1996	NCLR Bravo Awards	Nominated	Outstanding Program for Children or Youth	California Dreams

== Cast reunion ==
The main cast members from the first two seasons of California Dreams reunited on Late Night with Jimmy Fallon on March 4, 2010, and played the show's theme song. The version they sang was a unique mash-up that featured both Heidi Noelle Lenhart and Jennie Kwan, who replaced Lenhart in Season 2. While present, Jay Anthony Franke was not a featured vocalist in the performance, given that he did not perform the singing voice of Jake Sommers. Aaron Jackson and Diana Uribe were not present.
