= Remember (Star Trek: Voyager) =

- Star Trek: Voyager episode
- Episode no.: Season 3 Episode 6
- Directed by: Winrich Kolbe
- Story by: Lisa Klink
- Teleplay by: Brannon Braga; Joe Menosky
- Production code: 148
- Original air date: October 9, 1996

Guest appearances
- Charles Esten - Dathan; Eugene Roche - Jor Brel; Eve Brenner - Jora Mirell / Korenna Mirell; Athena Massey - Jessen; Bruce Davison - Jareth

Episode chronology
← Previous "False Profits"	Next → "Sacred Ground"
- Star Trek: Voyager season 3

"Remember" is the 48th episode of the science fiction television series Star Trek: Voyager, the sixth episode of the third season. Several guest stars feature as aliens that Voyager encounters and also in flashback/dream sequences. The story focuses on the character B'Elanna Torres, as she begins experiencing intense dreams after an alien deposits them in her mind.

The episode was written by Brannon Braga and Joe Menosky, from a story by Lisa Klink; it was directed by Winrich Kolbe.

This was broadcast on UPN on October 9, 1996.

== Plot ==
The Federation starship Voyager is transporting members of a telepathic race, the Enarans, to their homeworld. Chief Engineer B'Elanna Torres begins experiencing intense dreams in which she is a young Enaran woman named Korenna having a forbidden love affair. The dreams seem real, more like memories, and they become increasingly disturbing and dangerous, forcing Torres to seek answers from the Enaran passengers.

She learns that her dreams are actual memories being projected to her by Jora Mirell, one of the visiting Enarans, who was formerly named Korenna. The memories are of Korenna's relationship in her youth with Dathan, a member of the "Regressives", a group that preferred not to use technology but instead to live a simple life. The Regressives were deported and executed in a program of genocide. The Enarans, however, covered up the genocide by teaching succeeding generations that the Regressives brought about their own demise.

On Voyager, Torres visits Korenna's quarters, and finds her dying from what she claims is a murder to continue the conspiracy. Before dying, she projects the ending of the story to Torres — how her father turned her lover over to the authorities and she watched his execution.

Torres confronts the Enarans, but they deny wrongdoing. Though the Prime Directive forbids Captain Janeway from interfering, she casually remarks that the last of the Enaran engineers are packing their equipment. Torres rushes to engineering, where she confronts Jessen, an Enaran woman with whom she had become friends, and bemoans the fact that she is unable to project the memories and thus prove their validity. Jessen tells Torres that she is able to connect their minds, and proceeds to do so with Torres. The episode closes with the first 'dream' of all, but now Jessen is the main character.

== Reception ==
It has been rated as the best third season Voyager episode then produced by the Jammers Reviews website, with a "sensibly written" script and "wonderfully acted" show; its web creator, Jamahl Episcokan, awarded it 3.5/4 stars. Episcokan notes that:

'Star Trek has always been known to venture into social commentary and allegorical content, and with "Remember" the Voyager team comes up with a winner.'

Doux Reviews gives it 3/4, and it had 7.7/10 on TV.com based on 170 votes as of 2018. In 2019, Den of Geek ranked this the eighth best morality play of the Star Trek franchise.

In 2017, ScreenRant ranked this episode the seventh thematically darkest episode of the Star Trek franchise.

Tor.com gave it a 6/10.

== Releases ==
"Remember" was released on LaserDisc in Japan on June 25, 1999, as part of the 3rd Season Vol. 1 set.

This episode was released on DVD on July 6, 2004 as part of Star Trek Voyager: Complete Third Season, with Dolby 5.1 surround audio. The season 3 DVD was released in the UK on September 6, 2004.

In 2017, the complete Star Trek: Voyager television series was released in a DVD box set, which included it as part of the season 3 discs.

== See also ==
- Star Trek: Insurrection (1998)
