= Jennie Kwan =

American actress

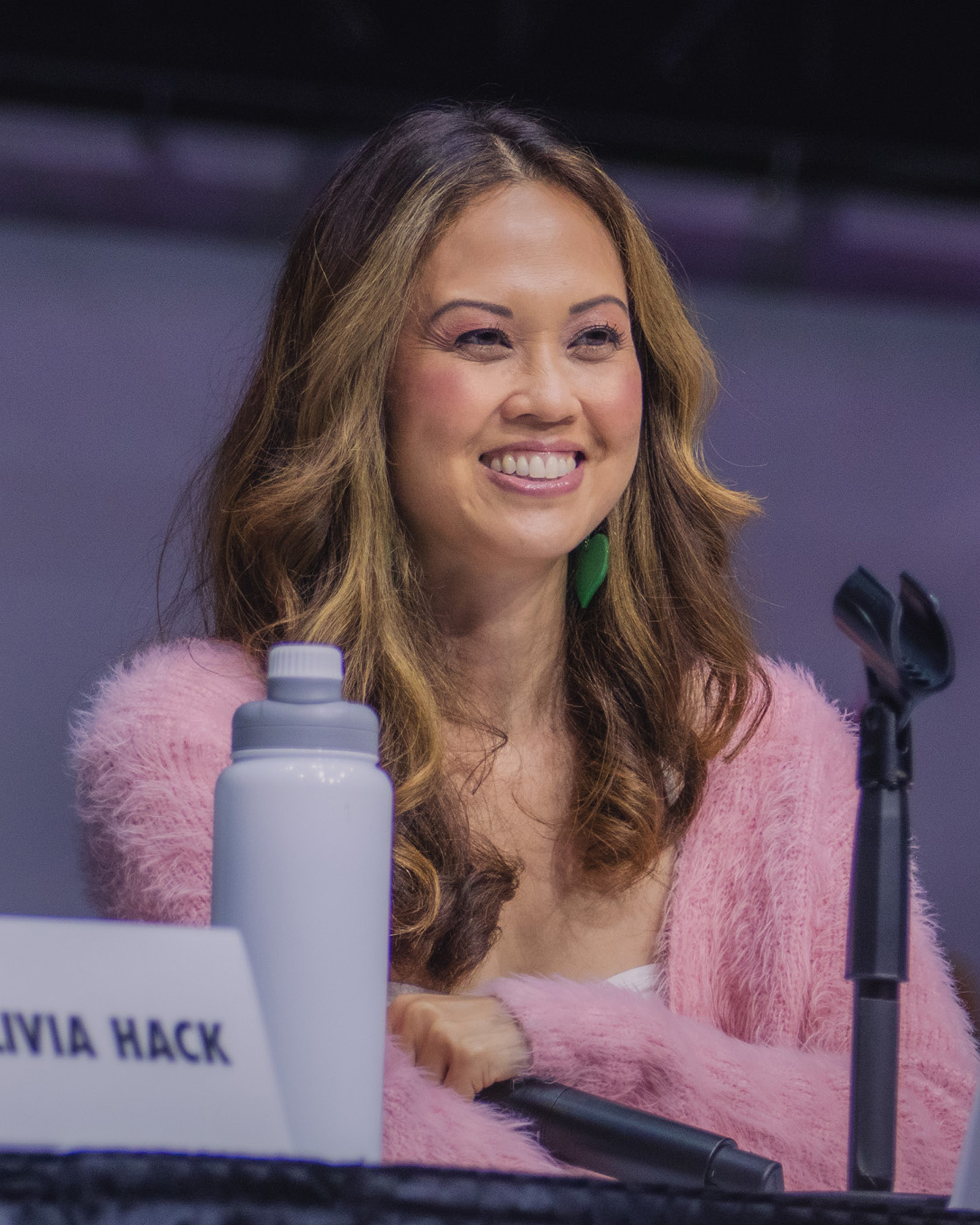
- Kwan in 2024
- Other names: Minx Lee; Trinity Lee
- Occupations: Actress, singer
- Years active: 1984–present
- Website: jenniekwan.com

Jennie Kwan is an American actress and singer. She played Samantha "Sam" Woo on California Dreams, and voiced Satoko Hojo in Higurashi When They Cry, Suki in Avatar: The Last Airbender, and Chun-Li in Street Fighter 6.

== Career ==
Kwan began acting at age 11 when she started performing with the touring company, "Kids of the Century". Her first television role was in 1991 as the voice of Audrey in Little Shop, a series based on the 1986 film Little Shop of Horrors.

She is best known as Samantha "Sam" Woo, a foreign exchange student from Hong Kong in the NBC sitcom California Dreams who first appeared in the show's second season. She joins the band as its singer and keyboardist.

Kwan competed on the twenty-fourth season of Worst Cooks in America, the show's seventh celebrity edition titled That's So '90s, which aired in April and May 2022.

== Personal life ==
Kwan was born and raised in Los Angeles, California. She is of Filipino, Spanish, German, Italian and Chinese descent.

== Filmography ==
=== Television ===
Year	Title	Role	Notes
1992	Beverly Hills, 90210	Girl #1	Ep. Song of Myself
1993–1996	California Dreams	Samantha 'Sam' Woo	Main role
1997	Family Matters	Kimberly	Ep. Revenge of the Nerd
1997	The Nanny	Mai Ling	Ep. Mommy and Mai
2010	Late Night with Jimmy Fallon	Herself/Performer	Ep. 2.29
2013	Anger Management	Woman	Ep. Charlie and His New Friend with Benefits
2016	New Girl	Boat Woman	Ep. Es Good
2021	The Rookie	Anakela	Ep. Sabotage

=== Film ===
Year	Title	Role	Notes
1993	Country Estates	Cheerleader	TV movie
1997	Trojan War	Trish	
2009	Let's Do It!: A California Dreams Reunion	Herself	Documentary short
2011	Play Time	The Wife	Short film
2012	Invasion of the Money Snatchers	Velma	Short film
2014	Promoted	Lu Chang	
2023	Suzume	Mami	English dub

=== Animation ===
Year	Title	Role	Notes	Source
1991	Little Shop	Audrey	Main role	
2005–2008	Avatar: The Last Airbender	Suki, Actress Princess Yue	Recurring role	
2006	Eureka Seven	Sakuya	English dub	
2007	Fate/stay night	Ayako Mitsuzuri	English dub; as Minx Lee	
2007	When They Cry	Satoko Hojo	English dub; as Minx Lee	
2007	Rozen Maiden	Nori Sakurada	English dub; as Minx Lee	
2009	Random Cartoons	Myang Myang, Bitgirl, Edu	Ep. Dr. Dee and Bit Boy	
2011	Durarara!!	Miria Harvent	English dub; Ep. 11	
2013	Accel World	Akira Himi/Aqua Current	English dub; as Trinity Lee	
2018	Goldie & Bear	Tess the Giantess	Voice role; Tess the Giantess	
2018	Beyblade Burst Turbo	Chiharu Aoi	English dub; Ep. 51	
2020	Demon Slayer: Kimetsu no Yaiba	Inosuke's mother, Kakushi	English dub	
2020	Scissor Seven	Thirteen	English dub	
2021	Detective Conan: The Fist of Blue Sapphire	Sonoko Suzuki	English dub	
2021	The Witcher: Nightmare of the Wolf	Young Luka		
2021	High-Rise Invasion	Mayuko Nise	English dub	
2022–2023	Around the Sun	Ace / Sabrina	Audio drama	
2026–present	Avatar: Seven Havens	Yeshe, Various voices		

=== Video games ===
Year	Title	Role	Source
2007	.hack//G.U. Vol. 3//Redemption	Aina	
2008	Avatar: The Last Airbender – Into the Inferno	Suki	
2009	Rune Factory Frontier	Eunice	
2015	Atelier Shallie: Alchemists of the Dusk Sea	Shallistera	
2017	.hack//G.U. Last Recode	Aina	
2018	Red Dead Redemption 2	The Local Pedestrian Population	
2021	Lost Judgment	Sayaka Nishizono	
2021	Demon Slayer: Kimetsu no Yaiba – The Hinokami Chronicles	Kakushi	
2023	Street Fighter 6	Chun-Li	
2024	Sand Land	Additional voices	
2025	Fatal Fury: City of the Wolves	Chun-Li	
