= Kit Fysto =

Music Duo (2012–2015)

- Genres: Dubstep, electronica
- Years active: 2012–2015
- Past members: Matt Good; AJ Calderon

Kit Fysto is an electronic music duo formed by Matt Good (former guitarist in D.R.U.G.S. and From First To Last) and his friend AJ Calderon. The group name was originally called juiceb0x, but due to copyright infringement, their name was changed to Kit Fysto.

== History ==
While in D.R.U.G.S., Matt Good and friend, AJ Calderon, created a side project named "Kit Fysto"' (originally juiceb0x). The two produced a few dubstep/electronica remixes under this name.

After Matt Good and two other band members left D.R.U.G.S., Kit Fysto became Matt Good and AJ Calderon's full-time project. The two played their first live show together at the 2012 Electric Glow Festival in Allentown, PA. The two have an official YouTube channel.

== EP's ==
- Cynical Youth EP (2013)

== Remixes ==
- Cobra Starship featuring Sabi - "You Make Me Feel..." (juiceb0x Remix)
- Story of the Year - "Wake Up" (juiceb0x Remix)
- Eva Simons - "Renegade" (Kit Fysto Remix)
- Cobra Starship featuring Mac Miller - "Middle Finger" (Kit Fysto Remix)
- Jeffree Star - "Prom Night!" (Kit Fysto Remix)
- Skrillex & Damian "Jr. Gong" Marley - "Make It Bun Dem" (Kit Fysto Remix): presented to "Make It Bun Dem's Beatport Play Remix Contest"
- The Veronicas - "Lolita" (Kit Fysto Remix)
- SkyBlu & Mark Rosas - "#SEXSONG" (Kit Fysto Remix)
- Justin Timberlake featuring Jay-Z - "Suit & Tie" (Kit Fysto Bootleg Remix)

== Band members ==
- Matt Good - Production, sequencer
- AJ Calderon - Production, sequencer
