= Promoted (film) =

2015 film by Isaac Constein

Promoted is a 2015 buddy comedy film directed by Isaac Constein which spoofs the inner workings of a dysfunctional Los Angeles Advertising Agency. The film was released on August 25, 2015.

== Plot ==
Jacob and his best friend Alex thought that they were on their way to earning one of LA's most highly celebrated advertising accounts. That is, until the manipulative Marissa enters the picture, doing everything in her power to win the promotion for herself while seducing Jacob into a romantic relationship. All chaos ensues as Jacob must somehow come up with a way to save his career, salvage his friendship, and figure out where his true loyalties lie.

== Cast ==
- Samm Levine as Jacob Silver
- Aries Spears as Platinum Artist
- Estelle Harris as Sylvia Silver
- Cody Longo as Alex Francis
- Marty Ingels as Murray Silver
- Joe D'Onofrio as Frankie
- Jennie Kwan as Lu Chang
- Clint Jung as Mr. Chang
- Justine Wachsberger as Marissa Fox
- Luke Ashlocke as Mike
- Mayank Bhatter as Vikram Gupta

== Principal photography ==
The film was set and shot entirely in Los Angeles.
