= Kelly Packard =

American actress (born 1975)

- Born: Kelly Chemane Packard; January 29, 1975 (age 51); Glendale, California, U.S
- Occupations: Actress, television personality
- Years active: 1980–present
- Height: 5 ft 4 in (163 cm)
- Spouse: Darrin Privett (m. 1996)
- Children: 4

Kelly Chemane Packard (born January 29, 1975) is an American actress and television personality. She is best known for her roles as Tiffani Smith on California Dreams and April Giminski on Baywatch, as well as co-hosting Ripley's Believe It or Not!. She also co-hosted the late segment of GSN Live from September 15, 2008 until November 28, 2008.

Packard also guest starred in the television series The Wonder Years, Blossom, Step by Step, Boy Meets World, USA High and The Wild Thornberrys.

As a child, she was also a contestant on the Bob Eubanks's daytime version of Card Sharks, during "Young People's Week".

On May 29, 2026, it was announced that Packard will reprise her role as April Giminski on Baywatch rebooted series in a recurring role.

== Personal life ==
Packard's family moved to Arizona, where she spent her childhood, before moving to Canyon Country back in California, and attended Canyon High School. Packard joined the Church of Jesus Christ of Latter-day Saints as a teenager. In August 1996, she married and was sealed (an LDS rite) to Darrin Privett, an Emergency Medicine physician. They have four children together – three daughters and one son – Aubrey, Dallin, Halle, and Delaney and live in Newhall, California, with their many pets. Packard is an animal lover and a vegetarian. On April 29, 2014, Packard and her family appeared in an episode of Celebrity Wife Swap, in which she switched places with actress Tichina Arnold, and in 2018 Packard sang the national anthem at Dodger Stadium

== Filmography ==
=== Films ===
Year	Title	Role	Notes
1991	And You Thought Your Parents Were Weird	Halloween Kid No. 2	
1997	Little Bigfoot	Lanya	
1998	Baywatch: White Thunder at Glacier Bay	April Giminski	Direct-to-video film
2000	Get Your Stuff	Jen	
2002	The Killing Point	Lisa	Direct-to-video film
2002	Auto Focus	Dawson's Blond	
2010	My Girlfriend's Boyfriend	Suzy	

=== Television ===
Year	Title	Role	Notes
1989	Living Dolls	Debbie	Episode: "Rick's Model Girlfriend"
1990	The Wonder Years	Susan Fisher	Episode: "Don't You Know Anything About Women?"
1990–1992	Blossom	Kimberly; Taylor	Episodes: "Pilot" and "Three O'Clock and All Is Hell"
1991–1999	Baywatch	Joannie; Beach Girl; Beth Campfield; April Giminski	Guest star in episodes: "The Trophy, Parts I and II", "War of Nerves" and "Trapped Beneath the Sea, Parts I and II" (1991–1995); Series regular (1997–1999)
1992–1996	California Dreams	Tiffani Smith	Series regular
1993	Step by Step	Marcia	Episode: "Love, Port Washington Style"
1994–1995	Boy Meets World	Tracy; Candy	Episodes: "Model Family", "It's a Wonderful Night" and "The Thrilla' in Phila"
1997	USA High	Tiffani Gleason	Episode: "Mr. Tiffani"
2001	The Wild Thornberrys	Nursery Attendant (voice)	Episode: "The Trouble with Darwin"
2002–2003	Ripley's Believe It or Not!	Herself	Co-host
2015	Stalked by My Neighbor	Lisa Miller	Television movie
2018	Family Vanished	Lisa	Television movie
