= List of The 39 Clues characters =

This is the list of fictional and non-fictional characters who appeared in The 39 Clues franchise. They may appear in The 39 Clues books and audiobooks, cards, or the series' official website.

== Introduced in The Clue Hunt ==
=== Clue Hunters ===
==== Amy Cahill ====
Amy Cahill (from Boston, Massachusetts) is a fourteen-year-old girl with jade eyes and red-brown hair. An avid reader and researcher, Amy is fascinated by libraries and museum pertaining to history and anthropology. She is agoraphobic and pyrophobic, the latter coming from memories of the fire that killed her parents when she was seven. She is the protagonist of the franchise.

It was Amy who first suggested that she and Dan join The Clue Hunt, only realizing how dangerous their situation was when the Starling Triplets were injured in the Franklin Institute bombing. In Seoul, she initially trusted Ian Kabra, but became more cautious after he left her for dead in a cave. In Moscow, she and Dan traveled alone, finding an ally in high-ranking Lucian NRR. In Australia, she declined an alliance with the Kabras and was almost fed to the sharks as a result. She realized it was Isabel Kabra who started the fire that killed her parents. In Beijing, she got in a fight with Dan over the true nature of her parents, resulting in them getting separated. On Mount Everest, she saved Ian's life but sacrificed the Janus serum in the process. In Kingston, the death of Lester reminded her again of how serious the Clue Hunt was and how important it was that she and Dan won. In Into the Gauntlet, after defeating Isabel, she convinced all the Cahills to write down their clues then united the family. She inherited leadership from Grace.

Following the Clue Hunt, Fiske Cahill and Nellie Gomez became Amy and Dan's legal guardians, and the four rebuilt Grace's mansion. Sinead Starling came to live with them, making various tech upgrades. Amy acquired a satellite, The Gideon, and linked it to a command center that linked Cahills across the globe. Amy took various lessons in self-defense and martial arts and began working out regularly. She attempted to reconnect with Ian Kabra but failed. She and Dan went on a small mission in Switzerland, where they encountered the Wyoming Twins and acquired Gideon's Ring. She had it made into a watch, which she wore. She then began dating Evan Tolliver.

She and Dan were attacked on their school bus at 8:42 AM EST, then received a text from Vesper One. They immediately left, stealing various objects for him, such as the painting Medusa. In Shatterproof, Amy, believing Ian was the traitor, confronted him. In Trust No One, she learned the truth about Sinead and confronted her. Amy, Dan, Atticus, and Jake traveled by train to the Rocky Mountains, where Amy was saved by Sinead. She freed the hostages but lost Evan in a fight against the Vespers. After Isabel destroyed the Doomsday Device, Amy was left unconscious by the explosion.

During William McIntyre's funeral, Amy was attacked and thrown into an open grave. She escaped, discovering journalists and paparazzi were following her. The government seized the command center, while she and Dan went to confront J. Rutherford Pierce. She, Dan, and Nellie traveled to Ireland, where she discovered Olivia Cahill's journal and the antidote for the serum. With the help of allies, she led the Cahills to find various ingredients to the antidote. A fight with Jake Rosenbloom led her to journey to the Svalbard Global Seed Vault, where she almost froze to death but was saved by Cara Pierce. In Guatemala, Amy took a dose of the pure serum to save Dan. She began experiencing the negative side effects, giving Dan temporary power because she did not trust her judgment. In Cambodia, she was the most hesitant to trust Cara. At the clam bake, she flew the crop duster with the antidote, but lost consciousnesses and crashed the plane into the ocean. After arriving at Pierce Landing, Amy typed the passcode to shut off Pierce's nukes. She resigned as leader of the Cahills, giving power to Ian Kabra, and begins a relationship with Jake Rosenbloom. She and Dan returned Olivia's journal, then took up traveling.

Following Nathaniel's takeover, Amy and Dan were recruited from Mont Blanc. Despite Ian being the leader, Amy was frequently looked to for leadership and her absence was believed to have been a major factor in the numbers who supported the Outcast, since Amy had been able to command the respect of all the factions within the Cahill family, allowing her to keep them together. She journeyed on the second Titanic, getting trapped in Antarctica by Alec Spasky. She was locked in a closet on an airship along with Dan and Hamilton Holt. Following the events in Mission Hurricane, Ian gave Amy her leadership position back. She traveled with Jonah Wizard and Hamilton Holt to Shanghai, where she was captured by Alec Spasky. He faked killing her, then allied with her. He brought her to The Hive, where she discovered Nathaniel's bees. Following Nathaniel's defeat, Amy decided Cahill leadership would transition to a new Cahill every four years. She appointed Dan the current leader.

She was willing to speak with Sinead and consider forgiving her and traveled with Dan to Havana. They found Sinead, escaping the city on a small motorboat and taking refuge at the abandoned Ekat stronghold in the Bermuda Triangle. There, Sinead brewed an antidote to the dancing virus, and Amy administered it to an infected Ian Kabra.

Family: Hope Cahill (mother, deceased), Arthur Trent (father, deceased), Dan Cahill (brother), Grace Cahill (grandmother, deceased), Fiske Cahill (great-uncle, legal guardian), Nellie Gomez (au pair, legal guardian), Jake Rosenbloom (boyfriend)

==== Dan Cahill ====
Dan Cahill (from Boston, Massachusetts) is an eleven-year-old boy. He has jade eyes and dark blonde hair. He is physically active, has broken bones multiple times, is good with numbers and puzzles, and has a photographic memory. He is slightly claustrophobic as he has asthma and has frequent attacks in tight, dusty spaces. His official card is No. 2.

Despite wanting the million dollars, Dan was more than willing to embark on the Clue Hunt for Grace. He was tied up by Ian in Paris and lost the Lucian serum. In Moscow, he and Amy left Nellie alone, discovering Lucian officer NRR was helping them find the Amber Room and their fifth clue. In Beijing, a fight with Amy caused them to separate, and he went on his own adventure with Jonah Wizard. This led to him getting trapped with the terracotta soldiers and an assassin actively trying to kill him. He reunited with Amy and considered quitting the Clue Hunt after Lester's death. He discovered the clue on Shakespeare's Tomb. On Cahill Island, he went up with Eisenhower and Hamilton Holt, discovered the elevator, and went back down to get the others. He saw and memorized the recipe for the serum.

Following the Clue Hunt, Nellie Gomez and Fiske Cahill became his legal guardians. At Amy's command, he engaged in training, both physical and mental, to prepare for any future missions or threat he will have to deal with. He became friends with Atticus Rosenbloom, though their communication was strictly virtual. He also went on a small mission in Switzerland, where he first encountered the Vespers.

Along with Amy, he was attacked at 8:42 AM EST. In Rome, he found and stole an original copy of Il Milione, despite Atticus' pleas of letting it be sent to a museum for study. After explaining to the Rosenbloom brothers the Vesper's threats, the four become allies, traveling the world and stealing objects for Vesper One. After witnessing Nellie getting shot, he secretly began collecting the 39 clues. In Trust No One, he met with Cahill scientists Sammy Mourad to make the serum. In Day of Doom, he tried to take the serum, but Amy confessed to switching it out with water. Unknown to her, he had a second dose, which he saved for later. Between Cahills vs Vespers and Unstoppable, J. Rutherford Pierce stole Sammy's lab research that existed because of Dan. In Countdown, when Dan was in danger of falling to his death, Amy took the serum to save him.

In Athens, Dan unintentionally broke two skydiving world records while escaping from Melinda Toth. He experienced firsthand the tidal wave intended to recreate Hurricane Katrina in Amsterdam. In Mission Atomic, he was captured by Nathaniel and brought to The Hive where he saw the killer bees. In Outbreak, he was adamantly against forgiving Sinead but agreed to venture to Havana with Amy. Once Dan had confirmation that Sinead's antidote worked, he injected himself with the virus to keep enemies away from the Cahills.

Family: Hope Cahill (mother, deceased), Arthur Trent (father, deceased), Amy Cahill (sister), Grace Cahill (grandmother, deceased), Fiske Cahill (great-uncle, legal guardian), Nellie Gomez (au pair, legal guardian)

==== Nellie Gomez ====
Nellie Gomez, from Massachusetts, serves as Amy and Dan's au pair and adult supervisor for their international travels. Nellie listens to music from her IPod most of the time. A Bob Marley fan, she describes herself as "reggae and punk fusion". She is also interested in the culinary arts, taking classes and frequenting various unique restaurants. While not a Cahill by birth, she is given honorary Madrigal status.

During the Clue Hunt, Nellie agrees to travel to Paris to help Amy and Dan, though is later convinced to continue traveling and accompanies the siblings throughout the hunt; as they have limited financial resources, she charges most airfare and lodging to her credit card. When Amy and Dan discover Madrigal messages on her phone and laptop, she initially lies and claims they're from friends, though is eventually forced to confess when helping the Madrigals initiate Amy and Dan into the secret branch.

Nellie is one of the seven Cahill hostages taken by Damian Vesper. Following the Cahill's failure to steal The Medusa, she is shot in the shoulder. She feels significant guilt in Phoenix's apparent death, having served as the hostage's unofficial leader for their time in captivity.

When Amy and Dan travel to Ireland to escape Pierce, Nellie investigates Sammy's suspected kidnapping and discovers Trilon Laboratories. Initially posing as a scientist under the alias Nadine Gormey, she eventually joins Sammy in captivity and serves as the staff's pastry chef. She joins him in destroying the lab and tests the antidote in Fiske. After defeating Pierce, she and Sammy begin dating.

Along with Sammy, Nellie travels to Singapore to investigate the Chen family in response to The Outcast's rise to power. She encounters a disgraced Sinead and is attacked by Alex. She and Sammy then travel to the Lucian stronghold in Moscow where they learn of Nathaniel's supposed assassination. On Mt. Fuji, she discovers that Magnus is stealing Tomas clues and pieces together that The Outcast is assembling all thirty-nine. After losing Dan on the train to the Black Forest, she and Sammy investigate Nathaniel's lab and are attacked by a mutant bear, but survive.

==== Ian Kabra ====
Ian Kabra (from London, United Kingdom), is a wealthy fourteen-year-old boy. He has cinnamon-complexion skin and amber eyes. He is interested in aviation, and grew up attending prestigious boarding schools. He excels at math. He had feelings for Amy Cahill, despite the disapproval of his mother, Isabel, but the two develop separate relationships and become close friends instead. His girlfriend is Cara Pierce. His card is No. 178.

Family: Isabel Kabra (mother), Vikram Kabra (father), Natalie Kabra (younger sister)

==== Natalie Kabra ====
Natalie Kabra (from London, United Kingdom) is the wealthy eleven-year-old girl. She enjoys shopping and fashion. Like her brother Ian, she has cinnamon skin and amber eyes. She carries a poison dart gun for protection. She died due to electrical shock by the Vespers in Day Of Doom. Her card is No. 112.

Family: Isabel Kabra (mother), Vikram Kabra (father), Ian Kabra (older brother)

==== Eisenhower Holt ====
Eisenhower Holt (from Milwaukee, Wisconsin) is a former West Point student who was expelled when Arthur Trent, his roommate, accused him of bringing home a firearm. He then failed to pass training for the FBI, and currently works as a security guard. He was present during the deaths of Hope Cahill and Arthur Trent, where he attempted to put out the fire using the neighbor's garden hose. He is a Tomas. His card is No. 145.

Family: Mary-Todd Holt (wife), Hamilton Holt (son), Madison Holt (daughter), Reagan Holt (daughter)

==== Hamilton Holt ====
Hamilton Holt (from Milwaukee, Wisconsin) is the sixteen-year-old son of Eisenhower and Mary-Todd Holt. A member of his school's football team and a master of parkour, he is also good with computers. He is considered a school bully. During the clue hunt, he defended Amy and Dan. In Doublecross, he is revealed to be homosexual and dating an unnamed boyfriend. He is a Tomas. His card is No. 90.

Family: Eisenhower Holt (father), Mary-Todd Holt (mother), Reagan Holt (younger sister), Madison Holt (younger sister)

==== Reagan Holt ====
Reagan Holt (from Milwaukee, Wisconsin) is the eleven-year-old daughter of Eisenhower and Mary-Todd Holt. Madison Holt is her twin. Her interests are kickboxing, ballet, and triathlon. She is the most compassionate member of the family. She is a Tomas. Her card is No. 123.

Family: Eisenhower Holt (father), Mary-Todd Holt (mother), Hamilton Holt (older brother), Madison Holt (twin sister)

==== Madison Holt ====
Madison Holt (from Milwaukee, Wisconsin) is the eleven-year-old daughter of Eisenhower and Mary-Todd Holt. Reagan Holt is her twin. She plays ice hockey. She is a Tomas. Her card is No. 187.

Family: Eisenhower Holt (father), Mary-Todd Holt (mother), Hamilton Holt (older brother), Reagan Holt (twin sister)

==== Mary-Todd Holt ====
Mary-Todd Holt (from Daytona Beach, Florida) is the wife of Eisenhower Holt. She is a Tomas. Her card is No. 238.

Family: Eisenhower Holt (husband), Hamilton Holt (son), Madison Holt (daughter), Reagan Holt (daughter)

==== Arnold ====
Arnold is the Holt family pit bull. He accompanies the family on the clue hunt. His cards are No. 403, No. 412, No. 414, and No. 418.

==== Alistair Oh ====
Alistair Oh (from Seoul, South Korea) is a Korean businessman. He always holds his diamond-tipped cane with him while traveling. Alistair is also the inventor of microwavable burritos. Although he lost much of his money on bad investments, he managed to live by himself since the death of his father Gordon. Alistair makes alliances with other teams only to then doublecross them, and sometimes leaving them to die. However, he demonstrated a particular fondness towards Amy and Dan as one of their most consistent allies throughout the Clue Hunt and tries to protect them several times. Also, he was one of the witnesses of Hope Cahill's and Arthur Trent's deaths, which left him guilt-ridden. He turned Isabel Kabra over to the police, putting her in prison for life. He is an Ekat, and his uncle Bae is the branch leader. He dies of a seizure due to a knee infection in Trust No One. He and Grace share the same paternal grandfather, Henry Cahill, though their fathers are half-brothers, having been conceived from separate marriages. His official card is No. 34.

Family: Gordon Oh (father, deceased), Bae Oh (uncle), James Cahill (uncle)

==== The Starling Triplets ====
Ned, Ted, and Sinead Starling (all from Oak Bluffs, Massachusetts) are American triplets. Ned, Ted, and Sinead are commonly seen in their preppy clothes. In the first book, while at the Franklin Institute, an explosion occurs that severely hurts them, and put them out of the clue hunt for almost a month. After recovery, they were grounded by their parents thus, they cannot continue on their quest. However, they found medical procedures to speed up healing for their injuries, but still leaving Ned with recurring and painful headaches and Ted almost completely blind. They have read up on the hunt during their hospital days to keep up with the other teams, and even stole one of Bae Oh's Clues. Sinead has become very protective of her brothers since their incident and made it her goal to use the master serum to cure them. They are all Ekats. In the 4th book of the second series, it was revealed that Sinead was Vesper Three, but later in Day of Doom she returns to the Cahills after realizing that she harmed her own family and that Vesper One will kill all the hostages, including Ted. They do not have any respective cards, although Sinead Starling appears in the card 303: magnifying glass and the card 284: Vesper Mole.

==== Irina Spasky ====
Irina Nikolaievna Spaskaya (from St. Petersburg, Russia) is a mysterious, forty-seven years old woman, who always wears her KGB uniform, which she used during the Cold War. She carries fingernail injectors filled with poison for protection. Her left eye commonly twitches when she is nervous. Irina's husband, Nikilovana Spasky, was killed by Isabel Kabra as he was next in line for Lucian leadership. Irina also had a son named Nikolai who died of scarlet fever she was on a mission. Though she began as one of their most ruthless opponents in the Clue Hunt, over the course of the series, Irina is shown developing a fondness for Amy and Dan. In the In Too Deep, Irina is incinerated while saving Amy Cahill, Dan Cahill, and Alistair Oh from Alistair's burning apartment. In the last book, it was revealed that she gifted Alistair a short-term memory loss pill before her death, which helps them make sure Isabel Kabra would not remember how to make the serum. She is a Lucian. Her official cards are No. 74 and No. 107.

Family: Nikilovana Spasky (husband, deceased), Nikolai Spasky (son, deceased), Aleksander Spasky (younger brother, deceased)

==== Jonah Wizard ====
Jonah Wizard (from Los Angeles, California) is a fifteen year old musician. He is an award-winning musician, artist, writer, producer, and entrepreneur, with his music on the top ten in almost every country; with his father Broderick serving as his personal manager. Jonah always wear jewelry around his neck. Cora Wizard, Jonah's mother, tried to train Jonah to become a killer. In The Emperor's Code, Jonah decided to quit the quest, only to return in Into the Gauntlet, where he was revealed to be a fan of William Shakespeare. Jonah is a Janus, and his mother, Cora serves as one of the branch leaders. After the conflict with the Vespers, he becomes a regular teammate of the Cahill siblings. Jonah's official card is No. 80.

Family: Broderick Wizard (father), Cora Wizard (mother), Phoenix Wizard (young cousin), Leila Wizard (aunt)

==== Broderick Wizard ====
Broderick Wizard (from Dallas, Texas) is Jonah Wizard's personal manager and father. Broderick always brings his BlackBerry with him. Although Broderick is not a Cahill, he knows more Clues than his family suspect he knows. Broderick's official card is No. 153.

Family: Cora Wizard (wife; separated), Jonah Wizard (son), Phoenix Wizard (nephew), Leila Wizard (sister)

=== Former and Current Branch Leaders ===
==== Grace Cahill ====
Grace Cahill (from Attleboro, Massachusetts) was the matriarch of the Cahill family. She died when she was seventy-nine years old. She had a jade necklace that she always wore until her death. She was a professional pilot, and had a private airplane that she flew around the world with, which she named The Flying Lemur. During her life, she was lonely due to the deaths of her relatives (her ex-husband Nathaniel Hartford, her daughter Hope Cahill, and her son-in-law Arthur Trent). Even though, she managed to keep all the Clues safe in her hands until her death just after she altered her will and thus started the quest. Her official cards are No. 59, No. 133, and No. 197.

==== Saladin ====
Saladin (from Attleboro, Massachusetts) is the Egyptian Mau of Grace Cahill. He is very fond of red snappers. He is named after Saladin, whose full name was Salah ad-Din Yusuf ibn Ayyub, and who was the Muslim prince who led the Muslims during the Crusades. Since the death of Grace, Saladin was missing until Amy and Dan Cahill found him, and he has joined them in the hunt since then. He is a Madrigal. His cards are No. 33, No. 140, and No. 202.

==== Isabel Kabra ====
Isabel Kabra is the main antagonist of the first series and the mother of Ian and Natalie. She was the one who murdered Amy and Dan's parents, and she eventually murdered Irina Spasky as well. She created the Master Serum as part of an attempt to become the most powerful human on Earth, but the vial containing it smashed. She was knocked out, and later taken into police custody. To get out of prison, she created a service called AidsWorksWonders, but it is revealed later that she simply pays people to claim that her organization helped them. In Day of Doom, It is revealed that she is Vesper Two. It is also revealed that she was faking texts sent by Arthur Trent to Dan, in order to make Dan give her information about the Master Serum. At the end of Day of Doom, she sees the dead body of her daughter, Natalie, and assuming that Vesper One killed her, she swears to take revenge on him. She drinks the Master Serum which she stole from Dan, and she storms into the room where Cahills and Vespers are fighting killing every Vesper in her way. She then attacks Vesper One, and meanwhile, she prevents Amy and Dan to do so. She eventually destroys The Machina Fini Mundi and she causes a massive explosion which kills both her and Vesper One.

==== Vikram Kabra ====
Vikram Kabra (from London, United Kingdom) was the leader of the Lucians, which he shared with his wife Isabel Kabra. He was an art dealer who served as Ian and Natalie Kabra's father. Later on, it was revealed that, only a few hours after Isabel's arrest, he chartered a plane to Brazil to avoid questioning. In Mission Titanic, Vikram is revealed to be working with the Outcast. In Mission Atomic, Vikram escapes after Ian and Cara crash through the greenhouse roof, then goes into hiding, presumably for good this time. His card is No. 232.

==== Bae Oh ====
Bae Oh (from Seoul, South Korea) was the leader of the Ekats. He is eighty-seven years old. He is commonly holding his silver-tipped cane. His twin brother, Gordon, was murdered by a killer he hired sixty years ago. He is Alistair Oh's uncle. When Alistair returned from the Madrigal gauntlet, he tricked Bae into confessing that he killed Gordon Oh and Madrigal agents inside the United Nations make arrangements to have Bae arrested for murder, arms dealing, assault, and battery. He was tortured to death. His card is No. 168.

==== Ivan Kleister ====
Ivan Kleister (from Oslo, Norway) is the leader of the Tomas. He is a champion skier. He is frequently competing with Eisenhower Holt for the branch leadership, even though he already has the position. His card is No. 188.

==== Cora Wizard ====
Cora Wizard (from Los Angeles, California) is one of the leaders of the Janus. She is the youngest person to receive a Nobel Prize in Literature. She trains her son Jonah to become a killer. Having grown disgruntled with the Cahill leadership under Ian Kabra, in Doublecross, Cora sides with the Outcast, which shocks her son, though she and her confederates vanish into hiding after their leader is killed to avoid retaliation from their relatives. Her card is No. 152.

==== Spencer Gray ====
Spencer Langendoen, also known by his professional name Spencer Gray (from New York City), was one of the leaders of the Janus. He does not have a card. When he would not step down, Cora Wizard leaked fake documents about him and he stepped down in disgrace.

==== Halima Amadi ====
Halima Amadi (from New York City) was one of the leaders of the Janus. She does not have a card. She was bribed by Cora Wizard to step down from her post as leader.

=== Other Cahill Characters ===
==== Hope Cahill ====
Hope Cahill (from Attleboro, Massachusetts) is the daughter of Grace Cahill. She is Amy and Dan Cahill's mother and was an archaeologist. She met Arthur Trent when she was in Istanbul, Turkey, and later married him. She perished in her burning house with Arthur. The fire was started by Isabel Kabra. She is a Madrigal. Her card is No. 247.

==== Fiske Cahill ====
Fiske Green-Cahill (AKA the Man in Black or the Man in Gray) (from Attleboro, Massachusetts) is the brother of Grace Cahill. An artist, Fiske was last seen leaving his painting studio before his disappearance forty-six years ago. Today, he is now disguising himself as an unknown assailant termed the Man in Black due to his oily-black suit that hides his entire body. He has been spying on the other teams since then. In the ninth book, he is shortly known as the Man in Gray, only to reveal his true identity to Amy and Dan Cahill later on. In the last book, he tells Amy and Dan about the Vespers, and later on adopts Amy and Dan. He is a Madrigal. His official card is No. 198 for his true identity, No. 203 for his alter ego Man in Black, and No. 208 for his other identity Man in Gray.

==== Beatrice Cahill ====
Beatrice Green-Cahill (from Attleboro, Massachusetts) is the sister of Grace Cahill. She is the mean, arrogant daughter of James Cahill who accepted the responsibility of taking care of Amy and Dan Cahill. She is not involved in the hunt, since she took the million dollars instead. She knows how it affected the lives of their family. She sent a private investigator after Amy and Dan after they joined the hunt, but after long efforts, stopped on finding them. She has been divorced thrice to, namely: Stephano Breglio, Jean-Luc Benoit, and Sergei Baskov. She is an inactive Madrigal. She does not have a card.

==== James Cahill ====
James St. James Cahill (from Attleboro, Massachusetts) is the father of Grace Cahill. He is a Madrigal and the half-brother of Gordon Oh. He has a card with 10 death heads. His brother is Jasminite Cahill

==== Edith Green ====
Edith Cahill née Schneider-Green (from Attleboro, Massachusetts) is the mother of Grace Cahill. She is a Madrigal. She died giving birth to Fiske Cahill. She does not have a card.

==== Henry Cahill ====
Henry Cahill (from Attleboro, Massachusetts) is the paternal grandfather of Grace Cahill. He was married to Flora Cahill St. James but had a child with Hae-In Oh. He is a Madrigal. He does not have a card.

==== Flora Cahill St. James ====
Flora Cahill née Cahill-St. James (from Attleboro, Massachusetts) is the paternal grandmother of Grace Cahill. She was married to Henry Cahill. She is a Madrigal. She does not have a card.

==== Nataliya Ruslanovna Radova ====
Nataliya Ruslanovna Radova, more commonly known as NRR, (from Volgograd, Russia) is the daughter of Grand Duchess Anastasia Nikolaevna of Russia and Ruslan Radova, the former branch leader of the Lucians. She suffers from hemophilia (a continuation of the Royal Haemophilia Line), and owns the ring of Czar Nikolai I of Russia. It is revealed in the Black Book of Buried Secrets that she was a Lucian double agent that spied for the Madrigal Branch, which orchestrated the murder of the Romanov family, but saved Anastasia Nikolaevna from execution. Though she remained an official Lucian, the Grand Duchess became loyal to the Madrigal cause and taught Nataliya their values. She does not have a card.

==== Nikolai Spasky ====
Nikolai Spaskaya (lt. Nikolai Spasky) (from St. Petersburg, Russia) is the son of Irina and Nikivlona Spasky. His father died five months after he was born. It is said that his mother never talked about his father much, and even when he asked about him, she replied, "You'll learn later". Sadly he never did. At age eight, Nikolai contracted a terrible disease which made his body numb. Irina never left his side, until Isabel Kabra assigned her to a mission in Helsinki. While on espionage, Irina had no contacts to the doctor, who had already confirmed Nikolai's death. He is a Lucian. He does not have a card.

==== Robert Bardsley ====
Robert Bardsley (from Pretoria, South Africa) is a music professor. He is a friend of Winifred Thembeka. He was a member of the Tomas until he discovered the true intentions of the branch. It is revealed that he joined the Madrigals later. He does not have a card.

==== Uncle Jose ====
Jose Correa (from Rio de Janeiro, Brazil) is one of Grace Cahill's long-distance cousins, referred by Amy and Dan Cahill as "Uncle Jose". He is one of those chosen by Grace to participate in the hunt, but took the million dollars.

==== Cousin Ingrid ====
Ingrid Martinson (from Oslo, Norway) is one of Grace Cahill's long distance nieces, referred by Amy and Dan Cahill as "Cousin Ingrid". She is one of those chosen by Grace to participate in the hunt, but took the million dollars.

==== Hae-In Oh ====
Hae-In Oh (from Seoul, South Korea) is the mother of Gordon Oh and grandmother of Alistair Oh. She is an Ekat. She was married to Hatta Oh, but had a son with Henry Cahill.

==== Hatta Oh ====
Hatta Oh (from Seoul, South Korea) is the husband of Hae-In Oh.

==== Gordon Oh ====
Gordon Oh (from Seoul, South Korea) is the twin of Bae Oh, and the half-uncle of Grace Cahill. He is also the father of Alistair Oh. He was murdered by Bae sixty years ago. He is an Ekat. His official card is No. 227.

==== Lin Kim ====
Lin Oh née Kim (from Seoul, South Korea) is Gordon Oh's wife and Alistair Oh's mother. She is an Ekat. She does not have a card.

=== Non-Cahill Characters ===
==== Arthur Trent ====
Arthur Josiah Trent (from Attleboro, Massachusetts) was the husband of Hope Cahill. He is Amy and Dan Cahill's father who is a nonlinear dynamics and quantum field theory professor. He is a West Point drop-out. He was born into a family with close ties to the Vespers, but never knew exactly what they were. After joining the Vespers in college, thinking they were a fraternity He had been sent to Turkey to find Hope and make her fall in love with him. However, when Arthur actually met his beautiful target, something happened. He was enchanted by her intelligence, her kindness, and the way her nose twitched when she laughed. He then learned some terrifying information about the Vespers. He realized that he needed to cut his ties to the organization, although the act would put him in danger for the rest of his life. Before he proposed, Arthur told Hope the truth about his background, but Hope already knew. William McIntyre's spies had been following him for months. He was believed to have perished in his burning house with Hope when he was forty-two years old, but in the book A King's Ransom it is revealed that he may be alive and still a Vesper. This theory is later disproved. The fire was started by Isabel Kabra. He is not a Madrigal, but was one of the most active people in the Madrigals. His card is No. 246.

==== Hilary Vale ====
Hilary Vale (from Massachusetts) is Grace Cahill's best friend. She is also Theo Cotter's grandmother. In the fourth book, she saves Amy and Dan Cahill from the Ekats. She also gives Amy and Dan the third Sakhet. Later, she tries to steal the third Sakhet from the children.

==== Theo Cotter ====
Theo Cotter is Hilary Vale's grandson. He is an archaeologist and Egyptologist who saved Amy and Dan Cahill from a trap. He helped them recover the third Sakhet in the fourth book. However, he tried to steal it from them later with his aunt. Due to guilt, he sent Irina Spasky away from the children.

==== Sami Kamel ====
Sami Kamel (from Cairo, Egypt) is the store owner of Treasures of Egypt. In the fourth book, his store secretly hides the Clue which Amy and Dan Cahill found.

==== Shep Trent ====
Shepard "Shep" Trent (from Sydney, Australia) is a professional pilot and surfer. He is Arthur Trent's best friend and cousin. He helped Amy and Dan Cahill escape Isabel Kabra and flies them to Coober Pedy.

==== Winifred Thembeka ====
Winifred Thembeka (from Johannesburg, South Africa) is one of Grace Cahill's friends. She is a librarian. In the seventh book, she gives Amy and Dan Cahill access to some of their grandmother Grace Cahill's belongings and photos.

==== Lester Dixon ====
Lester Dixon (from Spanish Town, Jamaica) is one of Grace Cahill's friends. He is an archaeologist. Although he helped Amy and Dan Cahill throughout the book, he abandons them amidst their confrontation of Isabel Kabra. He drowns on quicksand after trying to help Anton and Hugo Aguelles, Isabel's bodyguards; and is later pulled by policemen from the water. He dies after drowning in quicksand.

==== The Aguelles Siblings ====
Anton and Hugo Aguelles (from Kingston, Jamaica) are Isabel Kabra's ginormous bodyguards. They were only present in the ninth book, where they had caused much havoc to Amy and Dan Cahill. During an escape, the Aguelles were trapped on quicksand. Lester Dixon helped them, but instead the siblings used Lester as a ladder and led him to his death.

== Introduced in Cahills vs Vespers ==
=== The Council of Six ===
The Council of Six was the leading body in the Vesper hierarchy. Within the council, Vesper One held the most power while Vesper Six held the least. Sinead Starling and Isabel Kabra were both introduced in the previous series, but appeared in Cahills vs Vespers as different characters.

==== Vesper Six - The Enforcer ====
Revealed to be Cheyenne Wyoming. The daughter of two imprisoned criminals, Cheyenne worked her way up to the Vesper's Council of Six. In Day of Doom, she was arrested by local authorities and tied to various other crimes.

==== Vesper Five - The Spymaster ====
Revealed to be Luna Amato. In The Dead of Night, she was shot by Jonah Wizard.

==== Vesper Four - The Scientist ====
Revealed to be Sandy Bancroft. A weatherman, he was arrested by local authorities after the destruction of the Doomsday Device. It was revealed that his credentials were fake.

==== Vesper Three - The Mole ====
Revealed to be Sinead Starling. She fell in love with Riley McGrath, who presented the Vespers to her as good people. When she eventually joined, it was in part to help find a cure for her brothers. She framed Ian for her crimes, then turned and betrayed the Vespers. Despite Amy offering forgiveness, she fled, ending up in Singapore and eventually Havana.

==== Vesper Two - The Shield ====
Revealed to be Isabel Kabra. A daughter of Vesper parents, it is unknown if Isabel was ever loyal to the Cahills and if the Vespers were simply a get-out-of-jail-free card. She died fighting the Vespers, helping the Cahills destroy the Doomsday Machine.

==== Vesper One - The Mastermind ====
Revealed to be Damian Vesper, also known as Riley McGrath and Dave Speminer. He is a direct descendant of the first Damien Vesper. As Riley, he began a romantic relationship with Sinead Starling, convincing her to betray the Cahills. As Dave, he killed Astrid Rosenbloom in an attempt to destroy the Guardians.

=== Evan Tolliver ===
Evan Tolliver (from Attleboro, Massachusetts) was the boyfriend of Amy Cahill and a Cahill ally. During the events of Cahills vs Vespers, he helped Ian Kabra and Sinead Starling run the command center. He discovered Sinead was the mole. He was shot in Day of Doom.

=== Jake Rosenbloom ===
Jake Rosenbloom is the son of archaeologist Mark Rosenbloom and the boyfriend of Amy Cahill. Jake speaks many languages and has traveled extensively. He has studied the Voynich manuscript.

=== Atticus Rosenbloom ===
Atticus Rosenbloom is child genius with a field of interest in ancient languages. At only eleven, he is on par with the most knowledgeable adults in the world.

=== Erasmus ===
Erasmus (originally from Turkey) is a Cahill of mysterious origins. He was brought in by Fiske to help the Cahills defeat the Vespers. He rides a motorcycle, and is experienced in hand-to-hand combat and firearms. He died in Shatterproof at the hands of Luna Amato, then was avenged by Jonah Wizard.

=== Sammy Mourad ===
Sammy Mourad (originally from Egypt) is a Lucian-Ekat scientist. Studying at a university in New England, he was approached by Dan Cahill to create the master serum. He did, but began his own research into making the serum safe for consumption. He quickly stopped, realizing the work was wrong. Thinking J. Rutherford Pierce was Fiske Cahill, he gave away his research, allowing Pierce to mass-produce it. He was kidnapped by Pierce to help oversee the production, but along with Nellie Gomez, he destroyed the lab thus halting production. He is in a relationship with Nellie.

== Introduced in Unstoppable ==
=== The Pierce Family ===
==== J. Rutherford Pierce ====
Introduced to the world of the Cahills through Hope, Pierce took his opportunity to achieve greatness when he discovered there existed a completed version of the master serum that was safe to consume. On his quest to rule the world, he started with expanding his media outlet, Founders Media. He then entered the race for President, with the plan of detonating six small nuclear bombs and starting a third world war. In the chaos, he would emerge as a savior and slowly become the world's leader. His plan was stopped by Amy and Dan Cahill and friends when they infiltrated his clam bake, destroyed his stores of the serum, gave him and his men the antidote, and showed him abusing his wife on television. It was stated that he is now a joke.

==== Cara Pierce ====
The daughter and eldest child of J. Rutherford Pierce. She is an overachiever, and wants to please her father. She operates under the hacker alias AprilMay, and found herself in the employment of her father who did not know her true identity. She discovered his plans, and turned to the Cahill's side, helping them defeat Pierce. As Cara, she was given modified doses of the serum. Pierce promised her that she would be his heir, then disowned her when she betrayed him. She plays violin, and is in a romantic relationship with Ian Kabra.

==== Galt Pierce ====
The son of J. Rutherford Pierce. It was always assumed that he would be Pierce's heir, taking over his company and his power. He was enraged when Cara began getting Pierce's favor, and ruthlessly tried to stop the Cahills.

==== Debbie-Anne Pierce ====
Pierce's wife. He never loved her, still wished he'd ended up with Hope Cahill. She is a Starling by birth, and is Sinead's aunt. She played a small role in his downfall. It was revealed that they divorced, and she received a lot of money.

=== Pony ===
A digital cowboy. Nellie hired him after discovering that they Cahills had been hacked. He died at the end of Countdown.

== Introduced in Doublecross ==
=== Nathaniel Hartford ===
Nathaniel Hartford (from Cambridge, Massachusetts) was the husband of Grace Cahill. He was killed by Vladimir Spasky while in Moscow under the instructions of his own wife after she discovered that Hartford threatened their young daughter Hope when she made an innocent visit to his facility in the Black Forest, where he was secretly performing horrific experiments with radiation, leaving her traumatized. When Grace learnt about this, further investigation revealed that he was behind the Chernobyl disaster. He is an Ekat. In Doublecross, he is revealed to be the Outcast, the series' main antagonist. It was also revealed that Grace Cahill assigned Lucian assassin Vladimir Spasky to kill Hartford; however, Spasky let him live. In the final book, Hartford unveils his plans to wipe out the entire Cahill lineage with biological-engineered bees that have a sting which is fatal to anyone with genetics specific to those who are descendants of Gideon and Olivia Cahill, including his own allies. Hartford was killed in Mission Atomic when his own mutant bees turn on him in "The Hive". He does not have a card.

=== Magnus Hansen ===
The leader of the Tomas. Hansen turned to Hartford's side in an effort to dispose of Ian Kabra and helped his subsequent plans. He once had financial troubles with the Tomas and was asked to leave, but under the influence of the Outcast he was able to become branch leader. Like the other collaborators who switched sides to aid the Outcast, Hansen was invited to a so-called "celebration" at the Cahill mansion, but here, their leader revealed that he intended to purge the world of the Cahills entirely and locked the turncoats inside a greenhouse with his genetically-modified bees, though Ian and Cara Pierce release them and Magnus, like the other survivors, went into hiding to avoid punishment from his relatives.

=== Patricia Oh ===
The leader of the Ekats. She turned to Hartford's side in an effort to dispose of Ian Kabra. She is the great niece of Bae Oh

-- Alek Spasky -- The sister of Irina Spasky and the son of Vladimir Spasky. He was killed in Mission Atomic while saving Amy and Dan from Nathaniel's mutant bees. his wife is dead, killed while saving the people of Chernobyl. her name was Natalia Spasky.

== Founders ==
A collage of the images found behind Cards No. 6, #19, No. 33, #78, No. 91, #111, No. 149, #165, No. 211, and No. 220, also called The Jefferson Puzzle. The collage forms a painting made by artist Fiske Cahill. The painting features the four Cahill founders (from left to right: Katherine, Thomas, Jane, and Luke) fighting each other for causing their house going on fire and the death of their father Gideon (center right). Their mother Olivia (bottom right) screams in terror. Six black-coated men are also seen leaving the scene (far left and far right). On the left is Damien Vesper, leader of the Vespers; and on the right is some of Damien's followers, fleeing the scene. Vesper was going to get the serum by any means, but Gideon set the house on fire.

=== Gideon Cahill ===
Gideon Cahill (from Cahill Island, Ireland) is the father of the founders of the five branches. He was one of the smartest scientists in Ireland in his time, having discovered how to turn lead into gold. This was the reason that the townsfolk asked for his help to create a cure for the plague. However, in his efforts to find a cure, he discovered a serum that would enhance an individual's abilities in every kind of human endeavor, but it killed him from inside. Thus, he gave each of his children a part of the formula for safe guarding, improving their skills. Then he destroyed his research and died on the way. The children wanted the whole serum, and consequently continued to fight for it until the reunification caused by Amy and Dan Cahill's efforts. He died in a house fire caused by the Vesper family. He does not have a card. He had a ring that is very important and powerful – the Vespers hunt for it.

=== Olivia Cahill ===
Olivia Cahill (from Cahill Island, Ireland) is the mother of the five Cahill children and the supportive wife of Gideon Cahill. After Gideon's death, her children began on going their separate ways and created their own branches to compete with each other for the serum's powers. She inherited the ring as a token of love from Gideon after he died. She does not have a card.

=== Luke Cahill ===
Luke Cahill (from Cahill Island, Ireland) is the founder of the Lucians. He is the brother of Thomas, Katherine, Jane, and Madeleine. He is fond of poison and daggers, wherein Sir Isaac Newton found one of his swords. His branch originally settled in London, where he served as one of the advisors of King Henry VII, and continued to spread worldwide. This is proved by the diary which he gave to Jane, which is what she witnessed. He received the power of great violence and secrecy through the serum. His official card is No. 115.

=== Katherine Cahill ===
Katherine Cahill (from Cahill Island, Ireland) is the founder of the Ekats. She is the sister of Thomas, Luke, Jane and Madeleine Cahill. She is fond of technology and science. She has a deep abhorrence with Thomas that she managed to steal one of his clues after he decided to settle down with a wife, deviating from their previous decision to hide the clues. Her branch originally settled in Cairo, and continued to spread worldwide. She received the power of great knowledge and creativity through the serum. Her official card is No. 99.

=== Thomas Cahill ===
Thomas Cahill (from Cahill Island, Ireland) is the founder of the Tomas. He is the brother of Luke, Katherine, Jane, and Madeleine. He likes sports and games, as well as traveling. He has a high disgust with his once-favorite sister Katherine Cahill due to Katherine stealing one of his clues. His branch originally settled in Tokyo, and continued to spread worldwide. He received the power of great strength and agility through the serum. His official card is No. 124.

=== Jane Cahill ===
Jane Cahill (from Cahill Island, Ireland) is the founder of the Janus. She is the sister of Thomas, Luke, Katherine, and Madeleine. She is good at writing and painting, as well as at music. It is said that she knew who caused the fire. Her branch originally settled in Venice, and continued to spread worldwide. She received the power of great talents and skills through the serum. Her official card is No. 82.

=== Madeleine Cahill ===
Madeleine Cahill (from Cahill Island, Ireland) is the founder of the Madrigals. She is the sister of Thomas, Luke, Jane and Katherine. After the fire, Thomas, Luke, Jane, and Katherine went and founded the branches. They left their mother behind, not knowing that she was pregnant with their sister. Olivia raised Madeleine alone, stressing her desire for the branches to unite. Madeleine is rumored to have some dealings with the Vespers concerning Olivia's death, which suggests she knew who started the fire.

=== Damien Vesper ===
Damien Vesper is the founder of the Vesper Organization. A wealthy nobleman, he was friends with Gideon Cahill. Over time, he grew jealous of Gideon's success, wanting Gideon's research and discoveries for himself. When Gideon refused to share, Damien killed him and burnt down his house. He was not successful in getting the master serum and Madeleine later encountered him in a meeting which left him dead and strapped to a tree beside a warning: "beware the Madrigals". His descendants, the Vespers, have been enemies of the Cahills ever since.

== Minor Card characters ==
=== Victor Wood ===
Victor Wood (from London, United Kingdom) is a chemist of the Ekats. He is researching on a Clue under Dr. Lee. He was also sent to Easter Island to spy the headquarters of Madrigals. His card is No. 23.

=== Gordon Klose ===
Gordon L. Klose (from Tbilisi, Georgia) is a Lucian agent of Section 7 of the Government of the United States. He is apparently spying on Grace Cahill. His card is No. 39.

=== Alana Flores ===
Alana Flores (from Los Angeles, USA) is a chess prodigy of the Lucians. Her request to accompany The Kabras on the hunt was rejected by the branch due to her obvious ruthlessness. Also, she was sent to Easter Island to spy the headquarters of Madrigals. Her card is No. 40. She is one of the only Lucians who is not afraid of Isabel Kabra.

=== Heinrich Heinrichson ===
Heinrich Heinrichson (from Berlin, Germany) is an escaped prisoner of the Tomas. He is spying on William McIntyre. His card is No. 50.

=== Yasmeen Badawi ===
Yasmeen Badawi (from Maadi, Egypt) is a robotic inventor of the Ekats. She was hired by Bae Oh to invent robots to be sent for Clue search in Anak Krakatoa, Indonesia. Her card is No. 97.

=== Sophie Watson ===
Sophie Watson (from London, United Kingdom) is a Janus dancer. She is competing with Natalie Kabra on a Clue in her hometown. Her card is No. 151.

=== Devin Cooper ===
Devin Cooper (from Evanston, Illinois) is an Ekat treehouse engineer. He is building several booby-traps for the Ekat's safe-keeping of the Rosetta Stone in England. His card is No. 167.

=== Teodora Kosara ===
Teodora Kosara (from Sofia, Bulgaria) is an Ekat. She is looking for Clues everywhere in the world by sabotaging other people around her. In the Black Book of Buried Secrets, it is proved she has ties with the Vespers. In Rapid Fire 5 she appeared as a skydiving teacher and trained Amy into skydiving. Then she pointed Amy with a gun and asked, "Where's the ring?" (Gideon's Ring). Amy escapes. Her card is No. 169.

=== Andras Gergely ===
Andras Gergely (from Budapest, Hungary) is a Lucian. He is planning to conquer all branches with his branch. His card is No. 179.

=== Maleia Kalani ===
Maleia Kalani (from Honolulu, Hawaii) is a Tomas surfer. She was sent to Easter Island to spy the headquarters of Madrigals. Her card is No. 189.

== Mission characters ==
=== Mission 0: Agent Training ===
- Grace Cahill: See Grace Cahill.
- William McIntyre: See William McIntyre.

=== Mission 1: The Lost Clue ===
- Anne Cahill (from Drumnadrochit, United Kingdom) is an Ekat passenger of RMS Titanic. She was sent from Scotland to US to transport a Clue, only to almost perish on the ship. She stayed at Experiment, US to hide her identity and to keep Clue hunters away from the Clue. She has no card.
- George McClain (from Experiment, Georgia) is a Tomas funeral director. He is looking for the Clue in Mission 1 after having suspicions unto Anne Cahill. His card is No. 5.
- Paul Addison (from Drumnadrochit, United Kingdom) is a Tomas resident. He is spying on Charlie Wallace and the Loch Ness Monster, and tries to prove that the monster is only a hoax. His card is No. 49.
- Charlie Wallace (from Drumnadrochit, United Kingdom) is an Ekat resident. He owns the souvenir shop Nessie Shack, and tries to prove to everyone that the Loch Ness Monster is real. In reality, he is protecting the Clue in Mission 1 with a submarine designed to act like the Loch Ness Monster. He does not have a card.

=== Mission 3: The Lost Diamond ===
- Maria Marapao (from Manila, Philippines) is a Janus eskrimador. She is looking for the clue in Mission 3. Her card is No. 7.
- Jonah Wizard: See Team Six: The Wizards.
- Lilya Chernova (from St. Petersburg, Russia) is an Ekat socialite. Her family is disguising a piece of the Tavernier Blue into a necklace and keeps it in a family safe. Her card is No. 24.

=== Mission 4: The Lucian Fort ===
- Ian Kabra: For information, see Team One: The Kabras.
- Natalie Kabra: For information, see Team One: The Kabras.
- Chrissy Collins (from Frankfort, Kentucky) is a Lucian cheerleader. She was almost caught by the police for breaking into Fort Knox. Her card is No. 113.

=== Mission 5: The General's Clue ===
- Alistair Oh: See Team Three: Alistair Oh.
- Jonah Wizard: See Team Six: The Wizards.
- Mateo Sanchez (from Bogotá, Colombia) is a Tomas football player. He is protecting the Clue in Mission 5. His card is No. 122.

=== Mission 6: The Mad Scientist's Clue ===
- Leslie Mill (from Los Angeles, US) is a Janus director. He is directing a film about the Clue in Mission 6 after being told so by Cora Wizard. His card is No. 81.
- Jonah Wizard: See Team Six: The Wizards.
- Reagan Holt: See Team Two: The Holts.

=== Mission 7: The Frozen Secret ===
- Alistair Oh: See Team Three: Alistair Oh.

=== Mission 8: The Desert Sabotage ===
- Ian Kabra: See Team One: The Kabras.

== Non-Fictional Cahills ==
The following are historical or public figures mentioned in either the books, cards, or the online game as members of the Cahill family.

=== Lucians ===
- Isaac Newton PRS was an English physicist, mathematician, astronomer, natural philosopher, alchemist, and theologian. His Philosophiæ Naturalis Principia Mathematica (Latin for "Mathematical Principles of Natural Philosophy"; usually called the Principia), published in 1687, is one of the most important scientific books ever written. It lays the groundwork for most of classical mechanics. In this work, Newton described universal gravitation and the three laws of motion, which dominated the scientific view of the physical universe for the next three centuries. Newton showed that the motions of objects on Earth and of celestial bodies are governed by the same set of natural laws, by demonstrating the consistency between Kepler's laws of planetary motion and his theory of gravitation; thus removing the last doubts about heliocentrism and advancing the Scientific Revolution.
- Edmond Halley: FRS was an English astronomer, geophysicist, mathematician, meteorologist, and physicist who is best known for computing the orbit of the eponymous Halley's Comet. He was the second Astronomer Royal in Britain, following in the footsteps of John Flamsteed.
- Napoleon I, (from Ajaccio, France) is an influential political leader and emperor. In the fourth book, during his Egyptian expedition, he finds the first Sakhet among his Rosetta Stone discovery. Shortly after, he commands Bernardino Drovetti to deliver the Sakhet in France. In Mission 5, he sends a secret letter to King Ferdinard of Spain, telling him to take action against Tomas Simon Bolivar. His card is No. 180.
- Winston Churchill (from Oxfordshire, United Kingdom) is an influential political leader. In the seventh book, it was revealed that he was related to Shaka Zulu, one of the most superior Tomas of all time.
- Bernardino Drovetti (from Barbania, Italy) is a diplomat, explorer, antiquitarian, and lawyer. In the fourth book, it is revealed that he secretly hid the first Sekhmet in France as told by Napoleon I.
- Benjamin Franklin (from Boston, USA) is an influential author, politician, scientist, inventor, statesman, soldier, and diplomat. In the first book, while commissioned by the United States to Paris, he hid a Clue located under the Paris Catacombs. It started the rivalry between him and his own branch. He has no official card.
- Alexei Nikolaevich, (from Petergof, Russia) is the last heir apparent or Tsesarevich of Russia. He is the brother of Anastasia Nikolaevna Romanov. From him, the Royal Hemophilia Line continued and was passed on Nataliya Ruslanova Radova. Also in the fifth book, his bedroom served as a location for the next way to Nataliya. He has no cards.
- Anastasia Romanov, (from Petergof, Russia) is the youngest daughter of Nicholas II of Russia, the last sovereign of Imperial Russia. She is Nataliya Ruslanova Radova's mother. According to the fifth book, she was a good friend of Grace Cahill, and was the only one who escaped the murder of her family by the Bolshevik forces. Her official card is No. 94.
- Grigori Rasputin (from Pokrovskoye, Russia) is a starets. He is possibly Nataliya Ruslanova Radova's biological father. In the fifth book, his murder site, the Yusupov Palace, provided the next way for Amy and Dan Cahill to find NRR. He has no respective cards.
- Gustave Eiffel was a French structural engineer from the École Centrale Paris, an architect, an entrepreneur and a specialist of metallic structures. He is acclaimed for designing the world-famous Eiffel Tower, built 1887–1889 for the 1889 Universal Exposition in Paris, France. Notable among his other works is the armature for the Statue of Liberty, New York Harbor, United States.
- Sidney Reilly MC, famously known as the Ace of Spies, was a Jewish Russian-born adventurer and secret agent employed by Scotland Yard, the British Secret Service Bureau and later the Secret Intelligence Service (SIS). He is alleged to have spied for at least four nations. His notoriety during the 1920s was created in part by his friend, British diplomat and journalist Sir Robert Bruce Lockhart, who sensationalised their thwarted operation to overthrow the Bolshevik government in 1918.
- Ching Shih
- William Stoughton
- Grand Duke Konstantin Pavlovich of Russia
- Gavrilo Princip
- Catherine the Great
- Theodore Roosevelt
- Queen Victoria
- Aaron Burr

=== Ekaterinas ===
- Dr. von Gudden was a German neuroanatomist and psychiatrist born in Kleve. He was appointed personal physician to King Ludwig II of Bavaria. On 13 June 1886, Ludwig and Gudden were both found dead in the water near the shore of Lake Starnberg at 11:30 p.m., allegedly drowned, possibly murdered. To this day the details of their deaths remain a mystery.
- Howard Carter (from Kensington, United Kingdom) is an archaeologist and Egyptologist. He discovered one of the three Sakhets while searching for the tomb of King Tutankhamun; which contains part of the map of Nefertari's tomb in the fourth book. He has no respective card.
- Marie Curie was a Polish-born French physicist and chemist famous for her work on radioactivity. She was a pioneer in the field of radioactivity and the first person honored with two Nobel Prizes—in physics and chemistry. She was also the first female professor at the University of Paris.
- John Flamsteed FRS was an English astronomer and the first Astronomer Royal. He catalogued over 3000 stars.
- Eli Whitney
- Thomas Edison
- Nikola Tesla
- Albert Einstein
- T. E. Lawrence
- Orville Wright
- Wilbur Wright
- Abraham Lincoln
- Alexander Hamilton

=== Tomas ===
- Toyotomi Hideyoshi (from Nagoya, Japan) is an influential daimyō and warrior. He was the son of Thomas Cahill. In the third book, while invading South Korea, he hid his treasure at the Bukhansan, which was really a Clue. He does not have a card.
- Shaka Zulu Shaka kaSenzangakhona, also known as Shaka Zulu (from Melmoth, South Africa) is an influential leader of the Zulu Kingdom. In the seventh book, the Clue was placed beside his grave to commemorate his superiority at his branch. His official card is No. 146.
- George Mallory was a British teacher and mountaineer. He died on Mount Everest when he tried to hide a Clue.
- David Livingstone was a Scottish Congregationalist pioneer medical missionary with the London Missionary Society and explorer in Africa. His meeting with H. M. Stanley gave rise to the popular quotation, "Dr. Livingstone, I presume?".
- Jean-Baptiste Tavernier
- Gertrude Ederle
- Annie Oakley
- Paul Addison
- Lakshmi Mittal
- George Washington
- John Franklin
- Meriwether Lewis
- William Clark
- Sacagawea
- Neil Armstrong
- Simón Bolívar
- Ulysses S. Grant
- Dwight D. Eisenhower
- Marie Marvingt
- Louis XIV, King of France
- Arthur Wellesley, 1st Duke of Wellington

=== Janus ===
- Emperor Shah Jahan (from Lahore, Pakistan) is an influential emperor. He built the Taj Mahal for his wife Mumtaz Mahal. The Cahills thought that Shah Jahan was behind the hiding the Clue in Mission 2.
- Ustad Ahmad Lahauri (from Lahore, Pakistan) is a famous architect. During the construction of Taj Mahal, he was assigned to hide a Clue in one of his fortresses. He chose the Red Fort, specifically the Diwan-i-Khas, as the location of the Clue in Mission 2.
- King Ludwig (Ludwig Otto Friedrich Wilhelm; sometimes rendered as Louis II in English) was King of Bavaria from 1864 until shortly before his death. He is sometimes called the Swan King (English) and der Märchenkönig, the Fairy tale King, (German). Ludwig is sometimes also called "Mad King Ludwig", though the accuracy of that label has been disputed. Additional titles were Count Palatine of the Rhine, Duke of Bavaria, Franconia and in Swabia.
- Thomas Jefferson was the third President of the United States (1801–1809) and the principal author of the Declaration of Independence (1776). An influential Founding Father, Jefferson envisioned America as a great "Empire of Liberty" that would promote republicanism.
- Nannerl Mozart (from Salzburg, Austria) was a musician. After her death, her diary was kept inside a library in Vienna because of its significant value. It also provides information of his brother's acquisition of Japanese steel, which was actually a hint to the Clue in both the second book and the third book. She has no card.
- Wolfgang Amadeus Mozart (from Salzburg, Austria) is an influential composer of the Classical Era. He inserted his musical piece "The Place Where I Born" inside another of his compositions to provide hint to the Clue in the second book. He also acquired Japanese steel from Fidelio Racco to serve as a Clue in both the second book and The Sword Thief He has no official card.
- Mary Shelley: (née Mary Wollstonecraft Godwin) was a British novelist, short story writer, dramatist, essayist, biographer, and travel writer, best known for her Gothic novel Frankenstein: or, The Modern Prometheus (1818). She also edited and promoted the works of her husband, the Romantic poet and philosopher Percy Bysshe Shelley. Her father was the political philosopher William Godwin, and her mother was the philosopher and feminist Mary Wollstonecraft.
- Percy Bysshe Shelley: The husband of Mary Shelley
- Raoul Lufbery was a French-American fighter pilot and flying ace in World War I. Because he served in both French aviation, and later the United States Army Air Service in World War I, he is sometimes listed as a French ace and sometimes as an American ace, though all but one of his 17 combat victories came while flying in French units. He was famous for having a pet lion.
- Harry Houdini was a Hungarian-born American magician and escapologist, stunt performer, actor and film producer noted for his sensational escape acts. He was also a skeptic who set out to expose frauds purporting to be supernatural phenomena.
- Mark Twain was an author. It is revealed in Book 6 that he was almost killed by Robert Cahill Henderson/Bob Troppo.
- Lord Byron
- Puyi was a child emperor and the last Emperor of China. In Book 8 it was revealed that he hid the clue, Silk on top of Mount Everest with the help of Tomas George Mallory.
- Beethoven
- Alessandro Cagliostro
- Henry Morton Stanley
- Jane Austen
- Vincent van Gogh
- Maximilian I of Mexico
- Ambrose Bierce
- Walter Raleigh
- Josephine Baker
- Archduke Franz Ferdinand of Austria

=== Madrigal ===
- Anne Bonny disguised herself as a man to travel for the clue hunt. She owns a locket with the photo of Madeleine Cahill.
- Deng Xiaoping
- Amelia Earhart is a pilot. In Book 6, it is revealed that she was searching for Bob Troppo.
- William Shakespeare is Madeleine's grandson. He was the most powerful agent in the branch. However, when his children were born he became an inactive agent. He includes some clues in his plays.
- Mother Teresa
- Florence Nightingale became an active Madrigal because of treating people that are injured from war.
- Abigail Adams is the wife of non-Cahill second president of United States, John Adams.
- Dolley Madison had to hide a map to a ring from the Vespers.
- Harriet Tubman
- Frederick Douglass
- Nanny of the Maroons
- Walt Whitman
- Franklin D. Roosevelt
- Eleanor Roosevelt
