= King's Ransom =

King's Ransom may refer to:

- The ransom sum paid to release a captured king, including:
  - Richard I § Captivity, ransom and return
  - Ransom of King John II of France
- "King's Ransom" (Adventure Time), a television episode
- King's Ransom (novel), a 1959 novel by Ed McBain
- A King's Ransom, a 2011 novel by Jude Watson
- A King's Ransom, a 2014 novel by Sharon Kay Penman about Richard I
- King's Ransom (film), a 2005 comedy film
- Kings Ransom, the first film in ESPN's 30 for 30 documentary series
- "King's Ransom", a 2000 episode of Batman Beyond
- The Kings Ransom, an American garage rock band from the 1960s
