= The 39 Clues =

Novel series by various authors

- The Clue Hunt; Midnight Ride; The Maze of Bones; One False Note; The Sword Thief; Beyond the Grave; The Black Circle; In Too Deep; The Viper's Nest; The Emperor's Code; Storm Warning; Agent Handbook; Into the Gauntlet; The Black Book of Buried Secrets; Vespers Rising; Rapid Fire; #1: Legacy; #2: Ignition; #3: Hunted; #4: Crushed; #5: Turbulence; #6: Invasion; #7: Fireworks; Cahills vs. Vespers; The Medusa Plot; A King's Ransom; The Dead of Night; Shatterproof; Trust No One; Day of Doom; The Cahill Files; Operation Trinity; Spymasters Part 1: The Redcoat Chase; Spymasters Part 2: The Houdini Escape; Spymasters Part 3: The Submarine Job; Silent Night; Unstoppable; Nowhere To Run; Breakaway; Worlds Collide: Tales from an Awesomesauce Party; Countdown; Flashpoint; Doublecross; Mission Titanic; Mission Hindenberg; Mission Hurricane; Mission Atomic; Superspecial; Outbreak
- Author: Rick Riordan; Gordon Korman; Peter Lerangis; Jude Watson; Patrick Carman; Linda Sue Park; Margaret Peterson Haddix; Roland Smith; David Baldacci; Jeff Hirsch; Natalie Standiford; C. Alexander London; Sarwat Chadda; Jenny Goebel
- Country: United States
- Language: English
- Genre: Adventure; Young adult
- Publisher: Scholastic
- Published: September 9, 2008—September 27, 2016
- Media type: Print (hardcover), e-book
- Website: https://kids.scholastic.com/kid/books/39-clues/

The 39 Clues is a series of adventure novels written by a collaboration of authors, including Rick Riordan, Gordon Korman, Peter Lerangis, Jude Watson, Patrick Carman, Linda Sue Park, Margaret Peterson Haddix, Roland Smith, David Baldacci, Jeff Hirsch, Natalie Standiford, C. Alexander London, Sarwat Chadda and Jenny Goebel. It consists of five series, The Clue Hunt, Cahills vs. Vespers, Unstoppable, Doublecross, and Superspecial. They chronicle the adventures of two siblings, Amy Cahill and Dan Cahill, who discover that they are a part of the most influential and powerful family in history.

The first arc follows Amy and Dan's quest to find the 39 clues, a secret that will make its discoverer the most powerful person in the world. Subsequent arcs chronicle Amy and Dan's conflicts with enemy parties who desire either the clues or other Cahill family secrets. This series' primary audience is ages 9–14. Since the release of the first novel, The Maze of Bones, on September 9, 2008, the books have gained popularity, positive reception, and commercial success. As of July 2010, the book series has about 8.5 million copies in print and has been translated into 24 languages.

The books are published by Scholastic Press in the United States. Steven Spielberg acquired film rights to the series in June 2008, and a film based on the books was set to be released in 2016, but, as of November 2026, production has not yet started. The series also originated tie-in merchandise, including collectible cards and an interactive internet game.

== Characters ==
The books follow the adventures of Amy and Dan Cahill, two orphaned siblings from Massachusetts who become involved in the affairs of the Cahill family following the death of their grandmother, Grace Cahill. They are under the legal guardianship of their great-aunt Beatrice Cahill. Throughout their travels, they are assisted by their au pair Nellie Gomez and Grace's retainer William McIntyre.

Introduced in the first series as the competition are wealthy and ruthless English siblings Ian and Natalie Kabra, the athletic and militaristic Holt family—consisting of parents Eisenhower and Mary-Todd, son Hamilton, and twin daughters Reagan and Madison—hip-hop and action film celebrity Jonah Wizard and his manager/father Broderick, triplets academics Sinead, Ned, and Ted Starling, failed South Korean businessman Alistair Oh, and Russian ex-KGB assassin Irina Spasky. While Ian and Natalie's mother Isabel is the main antagonist, the mysterious presence of the Man In Black threatens the Cahill siblings at every turn.

In the second series, Amy and Dan are assisted by scholarly half-brothers Jake and Atticus Rosenbloom, Turkish spy Erasmus Yilmaz, and biochemistry graduate student Sammy Mourad. They encounter Interpol agent Luna Amato while Hamilton Holt is a fan of celebrity meteorologist Sandy Bancroft. While the Cahill's primary fight is with Vesper One, they also encounter his field agents, twin thieves Cheyenne and Casper Wyoming.

The third series sees the Cahills attempt to thwart media tycoon and aspiring politician J. Rutherford Pierce, whose children, Cara and Galt, work on his behalf. Nellie finds and enlists the help of digital cowboy Pony. In the fourth series, a usurper called the Outcast challengers the Cahills to prevent four disasters and demands they enlist no outside help.

== Books ==
=== The Clue Hunt ===
The 39 Clues books and card packs as of August 2010.

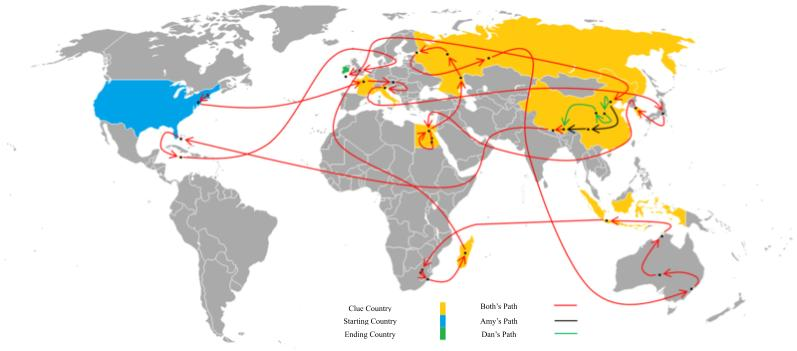
Amy and Dan's route in books 1 through 11.

The first series follows orphans Amy and Dan Cahill who discover their family has shaped world history and includes almost every notable historical figure from the past five centuries. The family is divided into four branches—the artistic and creative Janus, the innovative and exploratory Ekaterina, the physically strong and determined Tomas, and the cunning and strategic Lucians. As part of their late grandmother's will, Amy and Dan engage in a competitive international hunt for the clues while evading various recurring Cahill relatives. Each book focuses on the search for a single clue and the historical figure who discovered it first.

==== The Maze of Bones ====
The Maze of Bones is the first book in the series, written by Rick Riordan and published on September 9, 2008. It is 220 pages long.

Minutes before her death, New England socialite Grace Cahill alters her will. At her funeral, her grandchildren, Amy and Dan Cahill, choose one of thirty-nine clues over a one million dollar inheritance; siblings Ian and Natalie Kabra, the Holt family, the Starling triplets, Jonah Wizard and his father Broderick, businessman Alistair Oh, and assassin Irina Spasky also choose the clue; a total of seven teams are formed. Amy and Dan also learn that their family is the most powerful in human history, having influenced every aspect of human culture and society over the past five centuries. Almost every notable historic and public figure has been a member of the family, which is divided into four branches—the Lucian, the Ekaterina, the Tomas, and the Janus; each branch has specific skills and attributes and all share a common enemy in the mysterious Madrigals. Amy and Dan are aided by Alistair Oh as they discover a connection to Benjamin Franklin, but become separated in a fire secretly set by the Holts. Amy and Dan see The Man In Black in the distance and fear him. The Starlings are hospitalized following an explosion also set by the Holts while Amy and Dan travel to Paris with the help of their au pair Nellie Gomez. After declining an alliance proposed by Jonah and narrowly surviving a trap set by Irina Spasky and the Kabras, Amy and Dan search the Paris catacombs and find a series of numbers that direct them to music composed by Wolfgang Amadeus Mozart. Soon after, they learn about the original Cahill siblings—Luke, Kathrine, Thomas, and Jane—and discover a vial of liquid requiring an electric charge. At a nearby church, the teams converge on Amy and Dan in search of the vial. Amy and Dan, being chased by the Holts, climb into the bell tower, and Amy uses the church's lightning rod to charge the vial; it is then immediately stolen by Ian Kabra who uses a kite to glide out of the tower. The following morning, Amy and Dan realize the clue is "iron solute", an anagram of "resolution" which was part of the original clue given at Grace's funeral. On the trail of Mozart, they prepare to travel to Vienna.

==== One False Note ====
One False Note, the second book in the series, was written by Gordon Korman and published on December 2, 2008. It is 174 pages long.

On the train to Vienna, the Holts attempt to steal the sheet music from Amy, Dan, and Nellie, but it is destroyed and the teams part ways. Dan reveals he memorized the music and writes it on a napkin. Arriving, Amy and Dan visit Mozart's childhood home-turned-museum and learn of a diary written by the composer's sister, Nannerl; it is revealed to have been stolen, and that night in their hotel, Amy and Dan conclude Jonah and Brodrick are the thieves. Breaking into Jonah's hotel room, Amy and Dan steal the diary back while Nellie is arrested but released later in the night. Irina attempts to steal the diary but is tricked by Dan while Amy quickly discovers that the diary is missing pages. Following what information they glean, the three travel to Salzburg and follow Alistair into a cave. The sight of a Man In Black forces them deeper into the cave and a small explosion traps them; they manage to escape but are pursued by Benedictines before reuniting with Nellie who has found a tracker under Saladin's collar. They plant it on a sleeping Alistair and steal his lead which points to Venice. Arriving by car, they follow Jonah's vehicle and eventually track him to a record shop which houses a secret entrance into a Janus stronghold. There, Amy and Dan find the missing diary pages but are discovered shortly after stealing them; they escape and a chase across the canals ensues. Amy and Dan eventually lose the Janus but are knocked into the canals by Ian and Natalie. Recovering, Amy and Dan are eventually able to get Nellie—fluent in German—to read the diary pages, which point to merchant Fidelio Racco who has a house-turned-museum in Venice. Amy and Dan sneak in after closing with the intent of playing the sheet music on Racco's harpsichord, but Ian and Natalie interrupt them. As Ian begins playing, Amy realizes an earlier clue from the diary pages warns that the instrument is rigged, but is unable to stop Ian from playing the sabotaged key and triggering an explosion that knocks him and Natalie out. Amy and Dan continue the piece and discover two tungsten katanas, informing them of their second clue and next destination, Tokyo.

==== The Sword Thief ====
The Sword Thief is the third book in the series. It was written by Peter Lerangis and published on March 3, 2009.

At Fiumicino airport, Amy and Dan are about to follow Nellie onto their Tokyo-bound commercial flight when Ian and Natalie Kabra, having infiltrated airline personnel, pose as Dan and Amy and take their place on board. Stranded, Amy and Dan are forced to join in alliance with Alistair, who takes them to Tokyo in exchange for learning Tokyo is their destination. Dan learns through computer research that Toyotomi Hideyoshi is their historical figure of interest but the three are kidnapped by the Holts and forced to share their lead. Searching the Tokyo subway tunnels, Amy, Dan, and Alistair become separated from the Holts but get chased by the Yakuza. Ian, Natalie, and Nellie arrive to rescue them and the six for an alliance. Amy and Dan share what they found with Alistair—seemingly random shapes, but combine with a coin provided by Ian, Alistair conclude they must continue their search in Seoul. After researching in Alistair's private library—where Amy and Dan learn that a fire tore the original Cahill family apart—the group sets their sights on Pukhansan where they find a secret entrance that they unlock using the coin. Amy, having developed a potential romance with Ian, gives him back the coin. After learning that the next clue is gold—a clue Alistair and the Kabras already know—and learning the next location is Lake Tash, Ian and Natalie betray the alliance and use the coin to lock the others in the cave. Alistair notices explosives hidden in the cave's ceiling and Dan uses matches acquired in Tokyo to light them up, creating an exit. Alistair fails to escape while Dan informs Amy that the real next location is Cairo and concerns Sakhet. Dan realizes Alistair is secretly alive while Alistair, having faked his death on purpose, threatens his murderous uncle, Bae.

==== Beyond the Grave ====
Beyond the Grave is the fourth book in the series. It was written by Jude Watson and published on June 2, 2009. It is 156 pages long.

In the marketplace, Amy and Dan avoid an assassination attempt from Irina by sneaking into a souvenir shop where they meet Egyptologist Theo Cotter. Later, Amy, Dan, and Nellie use a credit card stolen from Alistair to check into the penthouse suite at the luxurious Hotel Excelsior. Exploring the room, Amy and Dan quickly stumble into a secret Ekaterina stronghold and notice three Sakhet statues but are quickly captured by Bae Oh; he demands Alistair's location. Nellie frees the siblings and they flee the hotel. As Bae's men close in on them, they are rescued by Hilary, Theo's grandmother and an old friend of Grace's. At her house, she gives the siblings a tourist's guidebook used by Grace on her frequent travels to Egypt as well as a golden statue of Sakhet. When Amy and Dan open the statue's base, they conclude that one of the statues in the Ekaterina stronghold is fake. Dan utilizes his photographic memory to overlay the hidden tomb drawing from this statue with the drawings displayed in the Ekaterina stronghold and Theo recognizes the new tomb as that of Nefertari. In Aswan, Theo negotiates ten minutes for Amy and Dan to explore the tomb; they find nothing, but soon after realize they need to count the number of steps in the tomb and sneak back in. Unknown to them, Irina is already in the tomb and cuts the power in an attempt to scare Amy and Dan out of the clue hunt. She steals Grace's guidebook and escapes while Nellie and Theo arrive to rescue Amy and Dan. Later, Jonah cuts their mooring line and sends Amy and Dan drifting down the Nile. He maroons them on a small island where they are chased by a crocodile but eventually rescued by a fisherman. At the airport, Amy notices a woman with a snake ring attempt to steal her Sakhet statue; it is later revealed to be Hilary who is working with Theo to steal the statue for Irina. After throwing her off with a false lead, Amy, Dan, and Nellie part ways with Hilary and Theo. At their hotel, they find Alistair, who offers them the use of his submarine to search the ruins of a temple. They find only the amount 1/2 gram but almost drown when Alistair's submarine begins to fail. After parting ways with him, Amy realizes the clue is myrrh and that Grace had hinted at it all along.

==== The Black Circle ====
The Black Circle is the fifth book in the series. It was written by Patrick Carman and published on August 11, 2009. It is 190 pages long.

In Cairo, Amy and Dan receive a mysterious message from someone known only as "NRR"; deciding to follow the trail, they travel to Moscow and discover a list of destinations they will need to visit. Having only twenty-four hours, they ally themselves with the Holts, promising to share whatever clue they find. Amy and Dan's research into Grigori Rasputin leads them to explore the final days of Grand Duchess Anastasia and Tsarevich Alexei. After avoiding two encounters with Irina, Amy and Dan learn they are being led to the Amber Room. The Holts, meanwhile, defend themselves from the Kabra siblings in Siberia as they work with Amy and Dan. At the Kremlin, Amy and Dan sneak into a Lucian stronghold and meet NRR, who reveals herself to be Grand Duchess Anastasia's daughter. Because of her haemophilia, she is forced to join in the clue hunt from the sidelines, but allied herself with Amy and Dan's parents, Hope Cahill and Arthur Trent, seven years ago; she is also a friend of Grace's. Tricking Irina, NRR sneaks Amy and Dan into the amber room where they learn the clue is 1g of melted amber, that the Lucians came very close to assembling all 39 clues through the work of Grand Duke Konstantin, and find false passports used by their parents that bear the surname "Noodleman". Irina arrives and threatens to kill the siblings, but the Man In Black arrives and threatens Irina. Amy and Dan escape and reunite with Nellie, whom they left in Egypt, but worry that strange voicemails they found on her phone mean she is untrustworthy. After sharing their clue with the Holts, they decide to follow in the footsteps of their parents, Amy and Dan arrange tickets to Sydney.

==== In Too Deep ====
In Too Deep is the sixth book in the series. It was written by Jude Watson (who also wrote Beyond the Grave) and published on November 3, 2009. It is 168 pages long.

Dan and Amy explore the Justice and Police Museum. They become separated; Amy is introduced to Isabel Kabra, Ian and Natalie's mother, while Dan learns the Kabras are interested in Robert Cahill Henderson, who got famous by attempting to assassinate Mark Twain and going insane. Amy, Dan, and Nellie seek out Amy and Dan's first cousin once removed, Shepherd Trent. A private pilot by trade, he reveals he flew Hope and Arthur on their list visit and agrees to take Amy, Dan, and Nellie and follow that same itinerary. After a surfing encounter with the Holts, Amy and Dan realize that their parents were on the trail of Amelia Earhart. Amy receives a call from Ian asking to meet and agrees to go alone. She is stopped by Irina who claims that Isabel intends to lie to her about the death of her parents. On Isabel's yacht, Amy declines an alliance and is rescued by Hamilton when Isabel tries to kill her. After another dangerous encounter with the Kabras on the runway, Amy, Dan, Nellie, and Shepherd arrive in Coober Pedy, Henderson's last recorded location and a location Hope and Arthur likely visited in secret. They find cryptic messages written in Troppo's room. While exploring the opal mines, Isabel drops venomous snakes and spiders on them; Dan has an asthma attack but the four escape unharmed. They conclude Henderson had a laboratory in Java. Irina poses as Amy and Dan's legal guardian and prevents Shepherd from flying them to Jakarta, but he slips the necessary documents to Nellie who shocks Amy and Dan when she reveals herself to be a pilot. Amy and Dan sneak off and charter a fishing boat to take them to explore the islands; they discover Alistair has already found what remains of Henderson's lab. A storm forces them to spend the night in a small house on the island, where Amy, through dreams and memory, realizes that Isabel set the fire that killed her parents but Alistair, Eisenhower, and Irina were all there. She is awoken by a fire in the present, burning down the small house. Irina arrives, blaming Isabel for both fires, and sacrifices herself for Amy, Dan, and Alistair. Amy and Dan realize the clue is water while Nellie arrives with a boat to rescue them.

==== The Viper's Nest ====
The Viper's Nest is the seventh book in the series. It was written by Peter Lerangis and published on February 2, 2010. It is 206 pages long.

Dan discovers Alistair found and concealed some of Irina's belongings, including the lyrics to a song which direct them to Pretoria. Parting ways, Amy, Dan, and Nellie arrive in Johannesburg but are quickly pursued by the Holts. Escaping, they run into Alistair; he claims to be on their side but they suspect he is in alliance with the Holts. A stranger slips Dan a message which leads him, Amy, and Nellie to follow the trail of Winston Churchill who was in South Africa investigating Shaka. At a library, Amy and Dan learn that Grace had multiple connections across South Africa and that Noodleman is known to the locals as a murderer. They also discover that Churchill found a secret Tomas clue buried with Shaka, then find a Tomas stronghold. Using Holt ID cards from Irina's belongings, they sneak in and find Shaka's tomb. Dan uncovers a box of diamond—the clue—and the three are rescued by Prof. Robert Bardsley, a friend of Grace's and the stranger who slipped Dan the message. At the airport, Amy, Dan, and Nellie are captured by the Kabras; Isabel reveals the vial from Paris to be a poison which she uses on Dan. After escaping the Kabras, he, Amy, and Nellie flee to Grace's house in Madagascar where Amy realizes the real clue is aloe and that she and Dan, as well as Hope and Grace, are Madrigals—a fifth branch within the family.

==== The Emperor's Code ====
The Emperor's Code is the eighth book in the series. It was written by Gordon Korman and published on April 6, 2010. It is 190 pages long.

Amy and Dan go to China to find the next clue. After searching for clues in Tiananmen Square, Dan runs off after an argument. Dan eventually works with Jonah and they visit the Shaolin Monastery and the Terracotta Army in search of clues, but Dan leaves his temporary alliance with Jonah after Jonah's mother, Cora Wizard, leader of the Janus, gets involved. During this confrontation with Cora, Dan accidentally reveals to the Wizards that he and Amy are Madrigals. Meanwhile, Nellie and Amy search the Great Wall of China for clues. Dan and Amy reunite in Tingri, China, and fly up to Mount Everest in an experimental helicopter where they find a Janus vial left by British mountaineer George Mallory. They battle Eisenhower Holt and Ian Kabra over a partial serum. Ian falls, and Amy sacrifices the serum to save him. When Dan thinks they had lost the clue, Amy shows him the poem on a silk fabric they found in Beijing and tells him the next clue is silk. They realize that a formula on the silk means that four partial serums add up to one master serum. Dan shows Amy the locket he found at a Shaolin temple, which contains an inscription of the name of the pirate Anne Bonnie. They decide their next destination is the Caribbean.

==== Storm Warning ====
Storm Warning is the ninth book in the series. It was written by Linda Sue Park and published on May 25, 2010. It is 190 pages long.

Amy and Dan continue their hunt in the Bahamas and Jamaica. They distrust Nellie after discovering that she works for William McIntyre. First, they go to Oceanus, an amusement park in the Bahamas. Dan enjoys the rides for two hours, and then meets up with Nellie and Amy. Amy tells Dan about the Jolly Codger Pirate's Cove Tour, which takes tourists on a boat to islands frequented by famous pirates. Amy and Dan reluctantly agree when Nellie says that she is going with them. When the tour docks at a cove, the first mate gives Amy and Dan a piece of paper with a message on it. They decode it and find out that is says " EAST END OF ISLAND. CAVE.". Meanwhile, Natalie Kabra recounts how she had been experiencing nightmares for a week about Dan and Amy almost dying while being pushed to a propeller by her mother Isabel, and there is no sound except for laughter. The Cahills find a Tomas bear claw in the cave. However, Amy is injured when the tide comes in and she hits her head on rocks. Soon, the group decides to head out of the Bahamas to Jamaica. At the Montego Bay airport, they find a hotel and settle in. Following a lead, they head to Spanish Town, and continue the hunt. They also meet a historian and librarian, Lester, and his grandma, Miss Alice. They learn that Nellie's family has been connected with the Cahills in many ways. They head out to the Port Royal excavation site with Lester, and find a box Grace donated that can fit the objects they collected. They cannot open the box. They are then chased by Isabel's thugs. Lester, who had the box, leads them into quicksand, but gets stuck himself, and drowns. Afterwards, the siblings quit the hunt. Instead of driving them to the airport, Nellie stops at Moore town and gives the box to the infamous "Man In Black", who had been following Dan and Amy, he gives the siblings one hour to open the box. They figure out that on the strip they found is an unfolded Möbius strip. Amy inserts the strip to the final slit and the box springs open. It contains a poem by Madeleine Cahill (the fifth child of Gideon and Olivia Cahill, unbeknownst to all but Olivia) and the clue of mace. The mystery man reveals his true identity as Fiske Cahill, Amy and Dan's grand-uncle and Grace's younger brother. He reveals the existence of the Madrigal branch, a previously unknown part of the Cahill family, and grants them and Nellie active Madrigal status (Nellie was the first non-blood related Madrigal to ever join). After reading the poem, Dan concludes that the siblings' next stop is England.

==== Into the Gauntlet ====
Into the Gauntlet is the tenth and penultimate book in the series. It was written by Margaret Peterson Haddix and published on August 31, 2010. It is 327 pages long.

All the Cahills go to the Globe Theater in London and fight over a note. Amy and Dan get most of the note, while others come out with nothing or a little hint. All the teams dig up a grave which leads them to the Cahill island at the home of the founder, Gideon Cahill. They go through a gauntlet with a series of questions for each of the branch members. Isabel Kabra captures them and threatens to kill their loved ones if they do not reveal their clues. She gets them to reveal their clues by threatening their loved ones and makes the serum, but Amy smashes the serum over Isabel's head, knocking her out. The last clue is the serum formula, which Dan memorizes, but no one wants it anymore. Amy and Dan reunite the Cahills, who are all going to have different lives now. They go back to their normal lives, each earning two million dollars.

==== Vespers Rising ====
Vespers Rising is the eleventh and final book in the original series, published on April 5, 2011. Rick Riordan, Peter Lerangis, Gordon Korman, and Jude Watson each penned a plot line. It is 238 pages long.

The first describes Cahill ancestor Gideon's discovery of the master serum and betrayal by his friend and first Vesper, Damien Vesper. The second recounts the life of Gideon's daughter, Madeleine, and her attempt to reunite the Cahill family, protect her father's ring, and outwit Damien Vesper from acquiring it. The third tells of Grace's first mission to Casablanca, as she competes against Vesper agent General George S. Patton to retrieve Gideon's ring. The fourth passage describes Amy and Dan's retrieval of Gideon's ring that Grace bequeathed to Amy, while escaping Casper Wyoming, a Vesper agent.

=== Cahills vs. Vespers ===
Cahills vs. Vespers is the second series in The 39 Clues franchise. It revolves around the newly united Cahill family fighting the shadowy organization known as the Vespers and takes place two years after the end of the clue hunt. Led by Damian Vesper—a direct descendant of the original Damian Vesper—the Vespers kidnap seven Cahills and demand ransom in the form of objects the Cahills need to procure. While Amy, Dan, Hamilton, and Jonah work on the ransom demands, Ian and Sinead work to uncover the location of the hostages and the true identity of members of the Vesper's ruling council of six.

==== The Medusa Plot ====
The Medusa Plot is the first book in the series. It was written by Gordon Korman and published on August 30, 2011.

Two years after the Clue hunt, all who succeeded in finding Gideon's serum recipe have united. The feud between the Cahills has ended, and the family unites to battle a new enemy: the Vespers, a secret organization led by Vesper One, who have been the Cahills' enemies since the time of their ancestor Gideon. Members of the Cahill family are kidnapped and will only be returned if Dan and Amy follow Vesper One's instructions. Amy and Dan are instructed by Vesper One to find a painting called the Medusa which leads them to a maze under the Colosseum that was designed by a Janus named Caravaggio, if they fail Vesper One will kill the hostages.

==== A King's Ransom ====
A King's Ransom is the second book in the series. It was written by Jude Watson and published on December 6, 2011.

Amy and Dan are in Santa Maria Novella train station in Florence when they come across a girl named Vanessa Mallory, who is Cheyenne Wyoming in disguise, and use her as a distraction to get into the train for Lucerne, Switzerland, where Vesper One is sending them for their next mission: find the De Virga world map. From information translated from German de Virga map archives, Amy concludes that they have to search Neuschwanstein Castle. Amy and Dan find a black notebook owned by Sparrow, a.k.a. Jane Sperling, at the castle. Inside is a note that leads to the de Virga map.

Analysis comes from the Cahill Command Center about the notes: they refer to a Johannes Kepler book recovered from the castle. The Cahills go to the book's current location at the Library of Philosophy and Cosmology in Prague but cannot enter without a reference. After going to Sedlec Ossuary on a hunch from the Command Center, they discover a Vesper One report on a flash drive and the initials AJT, Arthur Josiah Trent, carved on the wall, which shocks Dan because Arthur Josiah Trent was their father. Erasmus, a fellow Cahill, explains that Arthur was initiated into the Vespers but later cut off ties with them. After receiving an email from the library saying they can go, Dan and Amy enter the Library of Philosophy, they bump into Jake and Atticus, who help the siblings. Inside, Katja Mavel, the library director, gives them what they want. They find the map in the book. In Rome, a Vesper dressed like a waiter kills William McIntyre, who leaves a secret message in his shoe before he dies. Back in Prague, Amy and Dan tell Atticus what they are doing, and Atticus reveals his involvement as a Guardian, a separate family allied with the Cahills. Dan connects Il Milione and the map to Samarkand, Uzbekistan - their next destination. Vesper One asks them to drop off the package at the Astronomical Tower, near the statue of Jan Hus. They do, but the Vespers kidnap Atticus, who followed them. Vesper One now knows Dan and Amy have been hiding Marco Polo's epilogue and explains that Atticus was the price of keeping it from him. Minutes later, AJT sends another message to Dan's phone.

==== The Dead of Night ====
The Dead of Night
- Author: Peter Lerangis
- Series: Cahills vs. Vespers
- Published: March 6, 2012
- Preceded by: A King's Ransom
- Followed by: Shatterproof

The Dead of Night is the third book in the series. It was written by Peter Lerangis and published on March 6, 2012.

The Vespers have Atticus Rosenbloom and will kill him if Dan and Amy do not comply with their demands. Vesper One commands Amy and Dan to find a stale orb, an anagram for astrolabe. They fly to Samarkand, Uzbekistan, to find the astrolabe. Atticus escapes, and Dan suspects that his father murdered William McIntyre and is Vesper One. Ian goes to New York, suspecting Isabel to be Vesper One, and Isabel manipulates him into staying by saying that the other Cahills are not his friends. The hostages are rumored to be in Argentina because of a lizard Nellie holds in a photo. Dan has gathered seventeen ingredients of the thirty-nine for his own master serum. He has also been receiving texts from a Vesper claiming to be his father, so he texts back a question to confirm this and is shocked that the answer is correct.

==== Shatterproof ====
Shatterproof
- Author: Roland Smith
- Series: Cahills vs. Vespers
- Published: September 4, 2012
- Preceded by: The Dead of Night
- Followed by: Trust No One

Shatterproof is the fourth book in the series. It was written by Roland Smith and published on September 4, 2012.

Amy and Dan must steal the Golden Jubilee diamond from Berlin's Pergamon Museum to keep Vesper One from killing a Cahill. The Diamond is too well protected, but they escape from security. Vesper One reveals that they were merely a distraction, and he has what he needs. He tells them to find the "Apology", a Roman article written by a soldier. Jonah, Hamilton, and Erasmus work on tracking down Luna Amato, a Vesper, for information on William McIntyre's murder. Luna kills Erasmus, but Jonah kills her. The hostages try to escape, but the Vespers stop them. Phoenix, a hostage and Jonah Wizard's cousin, falls off a cliff. Before they escape, Casper and Cheyenne inform Amy and Dan of Phoenix's death, causing Amy to blame Ian. Meanwhile, Phoenix is revealed to have survived the fall, and escapes.

==== Trust No One ====
Trust No One
- Author: Linda Sue Park
- Series: Cahills vs. Vespers
- Published: December 4, 2012
- Preceded by: Shatterproof
- Followed by: Day of Doom

Trust No One is the fifth and penultimate book in the series. It was written by Linda Sue Park, the author of Storm Warning, and was published on December 4, 2012. The novel features Isabel and takes place in Brazil.

Vesper One tells Amy and Dan to go to Yale and steal the Voynich Manuscript, Folio 74. Evan finds out that Sinead is Vesper Three. She blocks Evan's messages, but Amy finds out, and the two fight before Sinead flees. Amy then apologizes to Ian, and they find that the folio is missing. After meeting Dave Speminer (a friend of the Rosenblooms' mother, Astrid), Atticus remembers something that his mom said to him before dying: Missing Voynich with LaCher. Vesper One streams a video of Nellie, telling them of Alistair's death. They check Astrid Rosenbloom's email for clues about the folio's location. A coded email directs them to the Iguazu Falls in Brazil. During a capoeira performance, a capoeirista "accidentally" injures Atticus. At the Falls, a second attack occurs, and a blow dart coated with curare hits Dan, but a nearby doctor saves him from the poison. They realize Isabel Kabra orchestrated the attacks and that there will be one more.

A taxi driver takes them to Mabu Thermas Hotel and Spa and sees Dan's new wallpaper on his laptop, one of the "plumbing pictures" in the Voynich. At the spa, they meet LaCher Siffright, who has Folio 74. LaCher protects Atticus from the third attack: a man who throws a knife and a skewer at Atticus. They find the folio and realize that Archimedes plays a part in the Vespers' master plan. They suspect Isabel to be Vesper One and ask Hamilton and Jonah to find out more about Archimedes. Amy is tricked into giving Vesper One Gideon's ring, which Grace entrusted her with. They find out the Vespers' master plan: to build the Machina Fini Mundi, a doomsday device. Traumatized by her betrayal, Amy hides in her own mind, blocking out the real world. Dan decides that the team should go to Attleboro. He believes that to combat a doomsday device, he needs the serum which he recently created, and he drinks an unknown liquid an Ekaterina scientist manufactures.

==== Day of Doom ====
Day of Doom
- Author: David Baldacci
- Series: Cahills vs. Vespers
- Published: March 5, 2013
- Preceded by: Trust No One
- Followed by: Nowhere to Run

Day of Doom is the sixth and final book in the Cahills vs. Vespers series. It is written by David Baldacci and published on March 5, 2013.

Continuing from the last chapter of Trust No One, Dan drinks the "serum" that he made with the help of an Ekaterina scientist, but Amy reveals that she replaced the real serum with a mixture of vegetables. Amy tells Dan that Isabel Kabra is Vesper Two, not Vesper One, and that she is flying to Washington, D.C. Following a clue from Astrid, Amy and Dan go to the National Museum of Natural History, which houses the largest collection of Lewis and Clark items. On the train, Vesper One sends them a video of the hostages. Atticus realizes that Ted is blinking Morse code and decodes the message: Riley McGrath is Vesper One. At the museum, they find out that Isabel wanted to see Lewis and Clark's compass. Dan sees numbers and letters scratched onto the back of the compass. Evan and Ian receive a call from Phoenix from a motel in Washington state and head there with Hamilton and Jonah, whom Sandy, Casper, and Cheyenne follow. Disguised as a waitress, Cheyenne forces them into a van, taking them to the Rocky Mountains. Dan decides to take a train to the Cascade Mountain Range, where they believe the hostages and the Machina Fini Mundi are. Atticus grows suspicious of Dave and finds out that Dave Speminer is an anagram of Damien Vesper, the founder of the Vespers. Dan learns that Isabel had been posing as his father and sending the text messages. Isabel kidnaps Atticus, steals the serum in Dan's bag, and escapes. Amy discovers that Isabel modified the coordinates etched on the compass's reverse. The location of the hostages and the Machina Fini Mundi turns out to be on the Rocky Mountains.

The Vespers move the hostages from the Cascades to the Rockies. En route, the hostages break free and incapacitate Sandy, Casper, and Cheyenne and meet up with Amy, Dan, Atticus, and Jake. They find the Machina Fini Mundi and battle the Vespers. The Vespers fatally shoot Evan, while the device electrocutes and kills Natalie. Amy turns the Machina Fini Mundi into a giant electromagnet. When the Vespers come, the device disarms and electrocutes them. Sandy and Damien arrive and hand out stone weapons. Isabel, having drunk Dan's serum and seeking revenge for her children, arrives and tries to stop Damien from inserting the final piece. The device activates, but Isabel destroys it. Damien melts into the device, causing an explosion, which kills Damien and Isabel. In the aftermath, Amy, Sinead, and Dan discuss how they will return to their normal lives.

=== Unstoppable ===
Unstoppable is the third series in The 39 Clues franchise. It was revealed in Publishers Weekly on October 25, 2012. Jude Watson wrote the story arc for the series. The first novel, Nowhere to Run by Jude Watson, was published in 2013, followed by Breakaway by Jeff Hirsch, Countdown by Natalie Standiford, and the last book, Flashpoint by Gordon Korman, in 2014.

Taking place six months after Day of Doom, the series follows the Cahills and the Rosenblooms as they fight wealthy media tycoon-turned-aspiring politician J. Rutherford Pierce, who is using his media empire to destroy the Cahills' reputations while attempting to hunt down and stage their murders as tragic accidents. After discovering that Pierce has gained his power by taking the Cahill serum, they race to find the six ingredients to the serum's antidote developed by Olivia Cahill.

==== Nowhere to Run ====
Nowhere to Run
- Author: Jude Watson
- Series: Unstoppable
- Published: October 1, 2013
- Preceded by: Day of Doom
- Followed by: Breakaway

Nowhere to Run is the first book in the series. It was written by Jude Watson.

J. Rutherford Pierce, a presidential candidate, attacks Amy and Dan and steals the serum from the safekeeper, Sammy Mourad (a Cahill student who made the serum with Dan in Trust No One), to use its power to conquer the world. Using the serum he makes himself a media empire, which he uses to attack Amy and Dan's reputation. This makes the siblings to go to a safehouse in Ireland where they find a book written by Gideon's wife Olivia, which contains the serum's antidote. Friends and family help Amy and Dan go to Troy where they find six whiskers of an Anatolian leopard, the antidote's first ingredient. Meanwhile, Pierce kidnaps Sammy, as part of his plan to mass-produce the serum and build an army for world domination. Nellie disguises herself as a chemist to be hired by Pierce and rescue Sammy from Trilon Laboratories.

==== Breakaway ====
Breakaway
- Author: Jeff Hirsch
- Series: Unstoppable
- Published: January 28, 2014
- Preceded by: Nowhere to Run
- Followed by: Countdown

Breakaway is the second book in the series. It was written by Jeff Hirsch.

It documents the continuing struggle between the Cahills and Pierce. It also documents deteriorating relations between the Cahills.

==== Countdown ====
Countdown is the third book in the Unstoppable series. It was written by Natalie Standiford.

In London, J. Rutherford Pierce meets with the Queen of the United Kingdom. However, his wife Debi Ann curtsies when Pierce told her not to, and Pierce later breaks one of the Queen's teacups while experiencing a tremor due to the serum. He tries to turn the mishap to his favor by saying that the teacup was too old and that it was time that the Queen got new china. However, the Queen is not pleased. Pierce reflects on how the Cahills are his last opponent to world domination, and vows to kill them.

In Guatemala City, Guatemala, the Cahills and Rosenblooms are at La Aurora International Airport. However, they see paparazzi who are sent by Pierce to publicize their every move. As they escape, they hear rude remarks from the paparazzi and passengers at the airport alike. They retreat to a waiting helicopter, and make a close escape. They see that Pierce's soldiers are after them, under orders to kill the Cahills but to make it look like an accident. The soldiers' breaths smell like green kale mixed with chlorine and ammonia.

After the helicopter takes off, one of Pierce's men who had taken the serum jumps extremely high.

The helicopter is on its way to Tikal, where the kids have to look for riven crystal in order to complete the antidote to the serum Pierce and his thugs have taken. Dan, Atticus, and Jake are all ignoring Amy because of how she left them behind while embarking on a dangerous mission.

Amy also told Jake, her ex-boyfriend, that she had never loved him. Amy decides that she would rather have her loved ones "angry and alive than dead". Amy also hears the clink of the serum that Sammy Mourad had made for her, just in case. As the group discusses the riven crystal and Tikal, a national park and archaeological treasure uncovered in 1956, the helicopter suddenly shakes. The pilot, who is wearing a parachute, was bribed by Pierce to jump out and crash the helicopter in an attempt to kill the Cahills.

The group fights the pilot, and Amy takes the controls. She unsteadily flies it to Tikal, where it falls thirty vertical feet onto a pok-a-tok court. Miraculously, the group survives with few injuries. A ranger picks them up and tells them information about Tikal. At their hotel room, the kids ask Pony to do a search on Debi Ann, who is a Cahill.

Later, Atticus uses Olivia Cahill's book to find out the location of the riven crystal. Meanwhile, in Trilon Laboratories in Delaware, Nellie Gomez, acting as Nadine Gormey, makes contact with Sammy Mourad, who is being held in the building to improve the serum for Pierce.

In Attleboro, Massachusetts, Pony works on getting information about Debi Ann, though it is difficult.

Meanwhile, in Tikal, as the group is searching for the crystal, Pierce's thugs ambush them, and Dan is critically injured. Amy takes the serum in order to save Dan, but now she only has a week to live. In Delaware, Dr. Brent Bechelheimer is trying to expose Nellie as a fraud, but she uses pictures of his gnoming hobby in order to portray him as unstable.

Meanwhile, Amy is experiencing side effects that will soon kill her. As events progress, Nellie discovers that Jeffrey Callendar is experimenting on Fiske Cahill. In Tikal, Hamilton, Atticus, Ian, and Jonah try to find out if Amy and Dan have recovered Olivia's book, and try to find the riven crystal.

Nellie tells Pony to warn Amy and Dan that they are heading into a trap. However, even though the riven crystal is found, Dan is abducted, Pony is killed by Pierce's thugs, and Nellie and Sammy are captured at Trilon Laboratories.

==== Flashpoint ====
The fourth and last book in the Unstoppable series, Flashpoint was written by Gordon Korman.

On their jet, Cara and Galt force a captive Dan to reveal the Cahill's progress on the antidote before departing for Cambodia. As they refuel on Midway Atoll, Cara secretly helps Dan escape. When Jonah's jet arrives refuels as well, Dan reunites with the Cahills and the Rosenblooms. In Cambodia, Amy, Dan, Jake, and Atticus fish for the Tonlè sap water snake in a nearby lake. They encounter Galt at Ta Keo but escape using ancient Khmer fireworks. Hamilton and Jonah search for the snake at a local crocodile farm farm but come up emtpy-handed. Ian runs into April May at Angkor Wat and learns she is Cara Pierce; she confesses that she wishes to ally herself with the Cahills.

The following day, the Cahills and Rosenblooms are attacked by Galt and his men; Cara secretly rescue them, earns their trust, and suggests using Pierce's upcoming clambake to deliver the antidote. Ian finds the snake in his show, prompting the Cahills and Rosenblooms return to New England. In Delaware, Nellie and Sammy successfully destroy Trilon Laboratories. They reunite with Amy, Dan, Ian, Hamilton, Jonah, Jake, and Atticus, and begin work on the antidote. Nellie tests the antidote on Fiske while Dan learns from Beatrice that Pierce used to date Hope.

That evening, Cara hides Dan, Ian, Hamilton, and Jonah in a shed on Pierce Landing. The following morning, Amy, Sammy, Jake, and Atticus fill a crop duster with antidote; Amy and Jake fly it over Pierce Landing, spraying the entire island moments before Pierce can announce his candidacy. It works, forcing him to retreat to his sauna and reveals to the Cahills—including Cara—and Rosenblooms that he has arranged for six small nuclear devices to explode and begin a world war. Amy and Dan realize the abort code is "Hope Olivia" and Pierce's plan is thwarted. Later, Amy and Dan decide to step down from the family and travel, leaving leadership in the hands of Ian who moves to Attleboro with Cara.

=== Doublecross ===
On April 26, 2014, at the New Hampshire Worlds Collide event, Scholastic announced a fourth series titled Doublecross. The series began with Jude Watson's Mission Titanic (2015), followed by C. Alexander London's Mission Hindenburg (2015) and Jenny Goebel's Mission Hurricane (2016). The series concludes with Sarwat Chadda's Mission Atomic published on June 28, 2016.

Taking place six months after Flashpoint, the series follows the Cahills, now led by Ian, in their fight against a man known as The Outcast. Believing the younger generation of Cahills to be unfit to lead, he takes over the family with the help of Cahill traitors and challenges the younger generation to stop four planned disasters. As the Cahills find and prevent The Outcast's events, they also attempt to learn his true identity and ultimate plans concerning the Cahill serum.

==== Mission Titanic ====
Mission Titanic
- Author: Jude Watson
- Series: Doublecross
- Published: February 24, 2015
- Preceded by: Flashpoint
- Followed by: Mission Hindenburg

Mission Titanic is the first book in the Doublecross series. It was written by Jude Watson, and published on February 24, 2015.

The book begins with a Cahill from the past, calling himself the Outcast, rising to challenge Ian with an impossible test. The Outcast will re-create four of history's greatest disasters and Ian needs to stop him. If Ian and his allies cannot decipher the Outcast's hints in time, innocent people will die. Ian's only chance to beat the Outcast is to find his former allies, Amy and Dan.

The Cahills figure out the Outcast's first hint leads to the 1917 Halifax explosion, an explosion caused by two ships crashing in the harbor of Halifax, one of which was carrying explosives and ammunition, which then exploded obliterating parts of the city. So, they go to Halifax and ask about what the ships are carrying. Eventually they discover that the hint actually refers to the sinking of the Titanic. They then find out that a Titanic II is going to Antarctica and that the Outcast will sink the ship. They then board the ship and stop it from sinking saving everyone on board.

==== Mission Hindenburg ====
Mission Hindenburg
- Author: C. Alexander London
- Series: Doublecross
- Published: July 28, 2015
- Preceded by: Mission Titanic
- Followed by: Mission Hurricane

Mission Hindenburg is the second book in the Doublecross series. It was written by C. Alexander London, and published on July 28, 2015.

The book begins with the Outcast giving another hint to the Cahills. Then, they figure out that the hint leads to the Hindenburg disaster. The hint involves the Kármán line being crossed, they then discover that there is a competition in Athens, Greece, to see what airship can cross the Kármán line and come back. They discover that the hint means that the winning airship will be attacked. Eventually, an airship run by the Lucians, containing many high ranking Lucian leaders wins, and is exploded, killing everyone on board.

==== Mission Hurricane ====
Mission Hurricane
- Author: Jenny Goebel
- Series: Doublecross
- Published: January 26, 2016
- Preceded by: Mission Hindenburg
- Followed by: Mission Atomic

Mission Hurricane is the third book in the Doublecross series. It was written by Jenny Goebel, and published on January 26, 2016.

The book begins with a hint that the Outcast's latest disaster is modeled after Hurricane Katrina, and that it will target the Netherlands. The Cahills travel to Amsterdam and discover that the Outcast is planning to detonate a lost nuclear bomb in the North Sea, overflowing the canals of the Netherlands and causing extensive flooding.

==== Mission Atomic ====
Mission Atomic
- Author: Sarwat Chadda
- Series: Doublecross
- Published: June 28, 2016
- Preceded by: Mission Hurricane
- Followed by: Outbreak

Mission Atomic is the fourth and final book in the Doublecross series. It was written by Sarwat Chadda, and published on June 28, 2016.

The book begins with the Cahills in Ian's apartment in London. The group decides to split up to fight the Outcast. First, Dan, Sammy, and Nellie will head to the Black Forest in Germany to check out one of the Outcast's former labs. Meanwhile, Amy, Jonah, and Hamilton will head to Shanghai, China, to look into an exposition with many Ekats in attendance while Cara and Ian head to Ukraine to look into the Chernobyl disaster.

=== Superspecial ===
Superspecial is the fifth and final series in The 39 Clues franchise, consisting of one standalone novel that takes place about six months after Mission Atomic and centers around Sinead Starling and the prevention of a bioterrorism plot she has become involved in.

==== Outbreak ====
Outbreak
- Author: C. Alexander London
- Series: Superspecial
- Published: September 27, 2016
- Preceded by: Mission Atomic

Outbreak is the only book in the Superspecial series, and the final book in The 39 Clues franchise. It was written by C. Alexander London and published on September 27, 2016.

Sinead Starling has returned, and has brought with her a plague which she has released in Havana. Amy and Dan are tasked with bringing her in, but discover she is only a pawn. The three escape Havana, fleeing to the Ekat stronghold in the Bermuda Triangle. While Sinead works on a cure, enemies from all sides converge on the Cahills. Amy succeeds in curing her friends, then gets the cure distributed to infected individuals across the world.

== Supplementary works ==
=== Companion Books ===
Scholastic has expanded the 39 Clues universe with several books. In 2010, Scholastic published two companion books: Agent Handbook, which explores the techniques that the clue hunters in the series use to find clues, and The Black Book of Buried Secrets, which provides more information about events in the series.

Agent Handbook	for books 1–9
The Black Book of Buried Secrets	for books 10 onwards

=== Rapid Fire ===
In the last week of December 2011, the Scholastic editorial team released seven short stories as part of The 39 Clues: Rapid Fire e-book series.

Legacy	Rapid Fire #1
Ignition	Rapid Fire #2
Hunted	Rapid Fire #3
Crushed	Rapid Fire #4
Turbulence	Rapid Fire #5
Invasion	Rapid Fire #6
Fireworks	Rapid Fire #7

=== The Cahill Files ===
Between 2012 and 2013, the editorial team released "The Cahill Files", which includes Operation Trinity and four e-books: The Submarine Job, The Redcoat Chase, The Houdini Escape, and Silent Night, the first three making up the compilation book Spymasters.

Operation Trinity	hardcover
The Redcoat Chase	Spymasters: Part 1
The Houdini Escape	Spymasters: Part 2
The Submarine Job	Spymasters: Part 3
Silent Night	e-book

=== Other ===
On December 1, 2013, an e-book was released on Google Play called Midnight Ride, which serves as a prequel to The Clue Hunt series. On April 2, 2014, an e-book called Worlds Collide: Tales from an Awesomesauce Party was released as a crossover between The 39 Clues, Infinity Ring, and Spirit Animals.

Midnight Ride	prequel to the entire series
Worlds Collide: Tales from an Awesomesauce Party	crossover event

=== Cards ===
As part of the multimedia interactive experience to promote the series, Scholastic includes six cards in each book of the 39 Clues series. Each card leads to one online clue, which readers can unlock by entering the code on the cards on their 39 Clues account online.

The 39 Clues uses collectible cards as an important part of the multimedia series besides the books and online game. In the first series of books, The Clue Hunt, each book came with six game cards. These cards all shared the same code and once added online would unlock the clue in that book. Alongside the first series of books, Card Packs were sold. These card packs contained 16 random cards out of a total of roughly 50 that were not available in the books. The card packs were:

Card Pack	for books 1, 2 and 3
Card Pack 2: Branch vs. Branch	for books 4, 5 and 6
Card Pack 3: Rise of the Madrigals	for books 7 and 8
Ultimate Card Pack	for books 9 and 10

In the second series, each book again came with six cards. However, unlike the first series, the cards were needed to unlock the online missions. Cahills vs. Vespers also had two card packs. These card packs all contained the same 16 game cards, which would unlock the online "extreme" missions. The card packs were:

The Marco Polo Heist	for books 1–3
The Magellan Heist	for books 4–6

In the third series Unstoppable, each book contains six game cards. These cards unlock an extra game in their corresponding online missions.

In the fourth series Doublecross, each book contains six virtual cards.

Players on the website can only collect all the clues through the use of the cards, and in later series can only unlock the missions by having the cards. The cards in the first series often had puzzles and riddles to solve.

Additional cards have been released over the course of the series, and the cards are only virtual. Scholastic developed a game involving the cards, Doublecross, in which players physically use their cards to battle their opponents.

== Themes ==
The 39 Clues series consists of adventure novels; however, the novels also fall within the genre of historical fiction. The stories switch back and forth between different characters' points of view. Each novel focuses on one historical figure and geographical location as Dan and Amy explore a clue related to a prominent Cahill family member in an exotic location.

One theme of the series is the relationship between talent and success. Each branch of the Cahill family has specific talents in a certain area; for example, the Ekaterina branch specializes in inventions and technology, the Tomas branch in athleticism and strength, the Lucians in strategy and politics, and Janus in art and music. Amy and Dan's competitors' talents give them an advantage, yet Amy and Dan consistently are ahead in the hunt and are viewed as the main threats. Over the course of the books, Amy and Dan discover their own talents.

== Origins ==
An editorial team in Scholastic came up with the idea of an interactive series with online games and asked Rick Riordan to write the first book. Riordan agreed because he thought it was a good idea, and as a middle school teacher he loved making history enjoyable for younger readers. The project was kept secret for about two years.

== Reception ==
=== Awards ===
As of June 11, 2010, The 39 Clues series had been on the New York Times bestseller list of Children's Series books for 48 weeks. Books in the series have also appeared on the USA Today, Publishers Weekly, and Wall Street Journal bestseller lists.

== Film ==
A film based on the series was originally planned, to be released in 2014. Steven Spielberg acquired film rights to the series in June 2008 and both Spielberg and Scholastic Media president Deborah Forte were to produce it, while Brett Ratner expressed interest in directing the first film in the series, and screenwriter Jeff Nathanson was hired to write the script in September 2008. Later, in May 2012, Shawn Levy, the director of the Night at the Museum movies, acquired the rights to direct the movie. The movie rights were then taken by Universal in August 2013.

== See also ==
- Infinity Ring
