= Vespers Rising =

2011 novel by Rick Riordan, Peter Lerangis, Gordon Korman, and Jude Watson

- Author: Rick Riordan, Peter Lerangis, Gordon Korman, and Jude Watson
- Language: English
- Series: The 39 Clues
- Genre: Children's novel Adventure novel
- Publisher: Scholastic
- Publication date: April 5, 2011
- Publication place: United States
- Media type: Print (hardcover)
- Pages: 240
- ISBN: 978-0545290593
- OCLC: 668191534
- Preceded by: Into the Gauntlet
- Followed by: The Medusa Plot

Vespers Rising is a part of The 39 Clues franchise, which includes the 39 Clues books, card packs, and interactive online games. The book is a transition between the first series, The 39 Clues, and the second, Cahills vs. Vespers. It was written by Rick Riordan, Peter Lerangis, Gordon Korman, and Jude Watson. The book was released on April 5, 2011. Unlike the other 10 books (with the exception of the last one), the title card shows a series of dots rather than a globe.

== Plot ==
This book has four plot lines. The first describes Gideon's discovery of the master serum and betrayal by his friend and first Vesper, Damien Vesper. The second recounts Madeleine Cahill's life and her attempt to reunite the Cahill family. The third tells of Grace's first mission to Casablanca, as she competes against George S. Patton to retrieve Gideon's gold ring. The fourth describes Amy and Dan's retrieval of Gideon's ring that Grace bequeathed to Amy, while escaping from Casper Wyoming, a Vesper member who is after it.

=== Gideon Cahill, 1507 ===
The first part recounts the story of Gideon Cahill and Damien Vesper, and the inception of the empowering serum made of 39 ingredients. It is set in the year of 1507, when the Black Death was abound, and a third of the European population had been claimed. Cahill allows Vesper to use his, Cahill's, ancestral island as a retreat from the plague. This proves to be a problem because Vesper wants Cahill's serum, which he made to help cure the plague. Vesper, however, wants it for the purposes of power. Cahill gives each of his children a quarter of the serum and tells them to flee the island. During the night, before they can leave, Vesper's comes in search of the serum; but the Cahill sets off an explosion in his laboratory. The house is set on fire, yet all four of Gideon's children: Luke, Jane, Thomas, and Katherine; plus his wife, Olivia, survive. The children quickly begin blaming each other for the fire and leave in two separate groups: Luke and Jane, and Thomas and Katherine. This leaves Olivia alone, and she vows to re-unite the family, with the help of her unborn daughter, Madeleine.

=== Madeleine Cahill, 1526 ===
Madeleine Cahill runs from home after the Vespers arrive and kill her mother. She finds Luke and becomes a governess to his son. However, when Luke inquires (as he had found her ring, which had once belonged to Gideon), she reveals that she is his sister. Luke, however, refuses to believe her, as he had heard similar claims before, and believes her to be working with Vesper, and orders her beheading in the morning. Madeleine escapes, and attempts to find the ring (aware of its "dark past"). Luke finds Vesper, who now has the ring, and attacks him, attempting to avenge his father. He fails, however, and is presumably killed. His son finds a note nearby: Beware the Madrigals.

=== Grace Cahill, 1942 ===
Grace, a thirteen-year-old girl, troubled with raising baby Fiske, the disappearance of her father James, and the death of her mother Edith, receives a Morse code transmission telling her to go to Casablanca, to find General George S. Patton, leader of Operation Torch, to find Gideon's ring in "bulls-eye". Concluding that General Patton is a Cahill, Grace sneaks out of her home to deliver the message herself. She meets a pilot named Drago, and rides his plane "Olga" to Casablanca. As they arrive, Drago is killed, but reveals that Olga is named for his daughter. She meets General Patton and delivers the message, but grows ambitious and searches for it herself. She finds the location, but sees that the hidden ring is gone. Patton reveals that he too, had found it empty, but a slight bulge in his pocket tells her otherwise. Realizing that Patton is actually a Vesper, she steals the ring and returns to her family in Monaco.

=== Amy and Dan Cahill, Vespers ===
Amy and Dan's normal lives take a dramatic turn when Uncle Fiske reveals to them that Grace's ring is hidden in Switzerland. Aware of the Vespers following them, they find a decoded message that leads them to her chalet in the Alps. They find the ring, but are attacked by Vesper spies, and escape with the help of Fiske's friend Erasmus, a fellow Madrigal, and they return to Boston, aware that they must prepare if they are to defeat this new threat. The next series will talk about how Amy and Dan have to find the Vespers, for they have taken many of Amy and Dan's cousins as hostages, and are willing to kill them for something very big that they want.

Preceded by Into the Gauntlet by Margaret Peterson Haddix	The 39 Clues Series; Book 11	Succeeded by The Medusa Plot by Gordon Korman
