= Beyond the Grave (novel) =

2009 Book by Jude Watson

- Beyond the Grave
- Author: Jude Watson
- Language: English
- Series: The 39 Clues
- Genre: Children's novel Adventure novel
- Publisher: Scholastic
- Publication date: June 2, 2009
- Publication place: United States; United Kingdom; Canada
- Media type: Print (hardcover)
- Pages: 192
- ISBN: 978-0-545-06044-8
- OCLC: 308561742
- Preceded by: The Sword Thief
- Followed by: The Black Circle

Beyond the Grave is the fourth book in The 39 Clues series first published on June 2, 2009 and written by Jude Watson. Thematically the novel uses Biblical knowledge, prophecy, and spiritual topics to explore the afterlife. Amy and Dan Cahill, the protagonists, travel to Egypt because of a clue they discovered in The Sword Thief. The symbols in the middle of the book translate "Alistair was there the night they died."

Beyond the Grave was awarded one of Good Morning America's pick for teen summer reading.

== Plot summary ==
Amy and Dan head for Cairo, Egypt, with their au pair Nellie Gomez, to find a clue, hidden by Ekaterina founder, Katherine Cahill. They were tailed by Irina Spasky, but escape to a store with an Egyptian goddess statue, the Sakhet. There, a man, Theo Cotter, shows up and convinces them it's a fake. Discouraged, they go back to Nellie.

They went to the Hotel Excelsior and find the Ekaterina stronghold. They find three Sakhets, and get trapped there by Bae Oh, who is the hotel's owner, and leader of the Ekats, after he explains the history of the Sakhets. As they escape, one of Grace's friends, Hilary Vale, finds them and takes them to her house. She gives them a letter and a small Sakhet, sent from Grace and they find out Theo is Hilary's grandson. They head for Queen Nefertari's tomb in Luxor and get trapped by Irina, who picks up Grace's guidebook in the process.

After Amy and Dan had escaped, they are trapped again by Jonah Wizard, who leaves them on a deserted island on the Nile. After Jonah leaves them, and heads for Paris they are chased by a crocodile across the island, but are saved by a local fisherman. They find out Hillary and Theo tricked them to get their hands on the Sakhet that Grace left for Amy and Dan. They use the Sakhet to successfully fool Irina into thinking that she has to go to Rabat, Morocco. They go to Aswan for the island Philae and the next clue.

After an unsuccessful attempt to find the clues under the Nile River with Alistair, Amy and Dan find something leading them back to Cairo. After arriving, they find a store which Grace once visited. The store owner, Sami, gives them a Senet board. After opening the puzzle, they discover their clue; myrrh.

It ends with the stronghold getting destroyed, and Amy and Dan finding a mysterious cloth with letter Ms in a pattern, indicating that it must have been the Madrigals.

Preceded by The Sword Thief by Peter Lerangis	The 39 Clues Series; Book 4	Succeeded by The Black Circle by Patrick Carman
