= The Medusa Plot =

2011 novel by Gordon Korman

- Author: Gordon Korman
- Language: English
- Genre: Children's novel Adventure novel
- Published: August 30, 2011
- Publisher: Scholastic
- Publication place: United States
- Pages: 222
- ISBN: 978-0-545-29839-1
- Preceded by: Vespers Rising
- Followed by: A King's Ransom

The Medusa Plot is the first book in the Cahills vs. Vespers series. The book was written by Gordon Korman and released on August 30, 2011. The story picks up two years after the original series The 39 Clues and is about the Cahills' attempt to save members of their family that have been kidnapped by following the instructions given by Vesper One.

The code that appears between pages 39 and 61 reads "The mother was murdered."

== Plot ==
At 8:42 EST, across various time zones, Fiske Cahill, Reagan Holt, Natalie Kabra, Nellie Gomez, Alistair Oh, Ted Starling, and Phoenix Wizard are kidnapped.

In Attleboro at the exact same time, Amy and Dan are on their school bus when a truck suddenly blocks their way. As the students get off the bus, masked men attack Amy and Dan. Amy fights them off; Dan runs off but returns with oil, and after threatening to burn the men, they run away, leaving Amy with a cellphone.

They return home, where McIntyre informs the siblings of the seven earlier kidnappings. Amy then receives a text informing her that she must go to Florence and await further instruction or one hostage will die. Amy addresses the Cahill family via her command center, promising to stop the Vesper while keeping the hostages alive. She calls for Ian Kabra and Sinead Starling to watch the Command Center, while Hamilton Holt and Jonah Wizard meet her in Italy.

In Florence, Amy receives another text commanding they steal Caravaggio's Medusa from the Uffizi. They succeed and get the painting to the Vespers. However, within minutes, Amy receives a text informing her that the painting the Vespers received was a fake. Vesper One gives Amy 96 hours to turn in the real one, or a hostage will die. As motivation, he shoots Nellie in the shoulder. The four begin researching the painting and the museum, discovering there was one time where it left the gallery. Art collector Gregor Tobin was involved, and the four conclude it's still with him.

Amy gets in touch with Tobin, asking if he would look at an Egyptian statue she inherited. Tobin agrees, letting the siblings into the house. They find a secret room housing various works of art. They steal the painting, getting safely away from Tobin. While Dan questions how the Vespers so quickly identified the museum's painting as a fake, Amy contacts Attleboro, tasking them with finding a charger for the phone. Ian goes to a local shop, where he runs into Evan Tolliver, Amy's boyfriend. Evan identifies the phone as a DeOssie, a phone that only high-ranking military officials use. Ian and Sinead agree to bring Evan in and brief him.

Dan discovers that the wood canvas the painting is on has words written in it. Dan sends a photo to his friend Atticus Rosenbloom, who says it refers to the Colosseum. Dan and Amy meet Atticus and his older brother, Jake, at the Colosseum and find the original copy of Il Milione. Dan pockets it, much to Atticus' horror. He and Jake chase down the Cahills, calling local authorities. The Cahill siblings escape, fleeing back to Florence.

In New York, Ian, Sinead, Hamilton, and Jonah go to the DeOssie factory, where they find chargers. After looking around, the building explodes. Sinead calls Dan and Amy to inform them of the unfortunate incident and tell them that chargers are on the way. After the phone call, they receive a text from Vesper One telling them to go to the circus. The siblings make the drop, only to find that Vesper One will not release the hostages unless Dan and Amy do another task in Lucerne. Angry, the two get ready for the trip ahead.
