= The Sword Thief =

2009 Book by Peter Lerangis

- The Sword Thief book cover
- Author: Peter Lerangis
- Language: English, Hebrew, French
- Series: The 39 Clues
- Genre: Children's novel Adventure novel
- Publisher: Scholastic
- Publication date: March 3, 2009
- Publication place: United States; United Kingdom; Canada; Israel
- Media type: Print (hardcover
- Pages: 160 pp
- ISBN: 978-0-545-06043-1
- OCLC: 298374079
- Preceded by: One False Note
- Followed by: Beyond the Grave

The Sword Thief is the third book in The 39 Clues series. It was written by Peter Lerangis and was published by Scholastic on March 3, 2009. The Sword Thief follows the first two books in the series, The Maze of Bones by Rick Riordan and One False Note by Gordon Korman. The following book continues the plot in Beyond the Grave.

== Plot ==
In Venice, Amy and Dan are separated from Nellie when Ian and Natalie steal their tickets and board the plane with the au pair ( Nanny) already on board. The siblings run into Alistair, who offers them a ride to Tokyo on his private jet. Once there, they learn about the life of Toyotomi Hideyoshi, the son of Thomas Cahill. They discover a collection of strange symbols, but are taken captive by the Holts who steal their lead.

The Holts bring their three captives to an underground train station, but a train scares the Holts off. Amy, Dan, and Alistair barely escape the train, and find themselves in an unused storage room. There, they find strange artifacts, but are chased back to the surface by the Yakuza. They're rescued by Ian, Natalie, and Nellie, who have stuck a deal and are working together. Amy and Dan are hesitant, but Ian gives Amy a small coin, stolen from Vikram Kabra, that should help them find the next clue. The six go back for the artifacts, discovering a message telling them to head to Seoul.

In Seoul, the six go to Alistair's house. They discover his hidden library, and after earning entrance, Amy and Dan discover a book informing them more about the 39 Clues. Alistair notes how much Ian and Natalie seem to already know, and how they're playing dumb to appeal to Amy and Dan. They then discover to head to Bukhansan, where Ian and Amy's flirting leads them to a secret entrance. The coin is the key, and after gaining entrance, Amy returns the coin to Ian. Nellie stays behind. In the cave, the five discover Hideyoshi's treasure, and the third clue—gold. Dan and Natalie discover mirror writing, and Dan solves the anagram, telling everyone Lake Tash is the next destination. Ian and Natalie take the information, betraying the others and sealing them in the cave. Angry, Dan reveals that he lied, and that Al Sakhet and Alkahest are the words. The siblings manage to escape the cave, but Alistair is killed in the collapse.

As the siblings are meeting up with Nellie, they see Bae Oh speaking with the Man in Black. They figure out the that clue is pointing them to Egypt. Meanwhile, Bae Oh is sitting in his office. He pages his secretary, but his resentful nephew Alistair answers, threatening him. When Bae looks into the receiving room, no one is there.

== Characters ==
- Amy Cahill
- Dan Cahill
- Nellie Gomez
- Ian Kabra
- Natalie Kabra
- Alistair Oh
- Eisenhower Holt
- Mary-Todd Holt
- Hamilton Holt
- Reagan Holt
- Madison Holt
- Bae Oh
- Man in Black

Preceded by One False Note by Gordon Korman	The 39 Clues Series; Book 3	Succeeded by Beyond the Grave by Jude Watson
