= Into the Gauntlet =

2010 Book by Margaret Peterson Haddix

- Into the Gauntlet
- Author: Margaret Peterson Haddix
- Language: English
- Series: The 39 Clues
- Genre: Children's novel Adventure novel
- Publisher: Scholastic
- Publication date: August 31, 2010
- Publication place: United States
- Media type: Print (hardcover)
- Pages: 327
- ISBN: 978-0-545-06050-9
- OCLC: 317919014
- Preceded by: Storm Warning
- Followed by: Vespers Rising

Into the Gauntlet is the tenth book in The 39 Clues novel series. It was written by Margaret Peterson Haddix and released on August 31, 2010.

The message on the cards is "Only together can we fight the true enemy."

The secret message in the book is "The Cahills aren't the only ones looking for the Clues. The Vespers are coming."

== Plot ==
Into the Gauntlet begins as Amy and Dan Cahill enter a London hotel tired and with no lead whatsoever. They receive another lead, which Amy realizes leads to William Shakespeare, so they go to a performance of Romeo and Juliet in The Globe Theatre. Once there, they confront the Starlings, who are back in the clue hunt after being sent to the hospital in an explosion back in The Maze of Bones, and steal their lead, but they are trapped by Jonah Wizard, who was forced back into the clue hunt by Cora Wizard, the Holts, Alistair Oh, and the Kabras. Hamilton Holt steals the piece of paper with the lead, but Dan rips off the top and bottom, and he and Amy run away while everyone else is fighting over the rest of the lead.

Amy and Dan realize that it leads to Shakespeare's grave site in Stratford-upon-Avon, and are among the last to arrive there. However, they are surprised to find that no one is fighting with each other and are instead making unsuccessful exchanges of clues and information. After the other teams leave, Dan rubs the grave and finds a secret message in which Shakespeare asks them to dig up his grave.

Inside Shakespeare's grave, Amy and Dan find a lead that takes them to the house of the original Cahills—a house on an island off the coast of Ireland. The other teams follow them there, but they are forced to work together as they make their way through the gauntlet, a series of doors with questions about the clue hunt. However, every door except the last is opened, and when they reach the vial that supposedly has the master serum, they find that Isabel Kabra beat them to it. She reveals that the serum is fake and forces them to give her all their clues to save the people they love. However, when Isabel is about to drink it, Ned Starling bursts into the room, and she turns towards him, about to shoot him with her gun.

Everyone unites and charges her, knocking the gun and the serum out of her hands. Only Amy and Dan hold her down while everyone else chases after the serum. In the ensuing fight, Amy destroys the serum, but everyone gives Amy and Dan their clues because they were the only ones that held down Isabel while they all chased after the serum.

After finding their way out of the gauntlet, the teams separate on amiable terms, and Amy and Dan stay behind with Fiske Cahill and Mr. McIntyre, who give them a letter from Grace. They then reveal that the entire Clue Hunt was just a preparation for the battle with another family. Amy and Dan are left in the legal custody of both their Great-Uncle Fiske and Nellie, but the letter makes it clear that their adventures are not over yet.

Preceded by Storm Warning by Linda Sue Park	The 39 Clues Series; Book 10	Succeeded by Vespers Rising by Rick Riordan, Gordon Korman, Peter Lerangis, and Jude Watson
