= Doublecross (series) =

The 39 Clues: Doublecross is the fourth series in the 39 Clues series of books. The series was published from 2015 to 2016. It follows the story of the Cahills as they suffer from infighting. In the first book, Mission Titanic, Ian Kabra has become the new leader of the Cahills. Dan and Amy decided to take a break from the Cahills after nearly dying from combating Pierce and his thugs. Although Ian believe that he is much more fit to rule the Cahills that Amy and Dan, it seems that the Cahills do not fully recognize Ian as the leader. Ian has suspicions that many Cahills are plotting a coup. When this coup is realized, Ian Kabra and Cara Pierce are expelled from the Cahill home in Attleboro, Massachusetts. The leader of the coup is the Outcast, and he plans to replicate history's worst disasters in order to test Cahill leadership. The Cahills are expected to prevent the disasters in order to prove that they are worthy. Throughout the series, the Cahills make many shocking discoveries, discovering that Grace was actually ruthless and cruel, and that the Outcast is Nathaniel Hartford, the husband of Grace whom Grace wanted dead. There are four books in the series:

== The Disasters in Doublecross ==
The Disasters in Doublecross were based on actual disasters that took place. Here is some background on several disasters:

- Mission Titanic: This disaster is based on the RMS Titanic, with most of the book focusing on the Halifax Explosion (1917) during World War I. While 2 ships the Mont Blanc a French ship carrying tons of explosives because it was heading out to war crashed with another ship all the explosives exploded & the glass became flying bullets blinding maiming blinding & killing people. The event was at 8:45 in the morning. It is thought to have around 2000 deaths ( 1950 confirmed) and harming around 9000 more. Amy & Dan along with their cousins & Cara Pierce their friend have to get on a ship called the Aurora and somehow loaded tons of explosives off the ship without the owner also harming them. But they soon figured out they were wrong and have another Titanic on their hands one of the largest man-made ships. Hit an iceberg on its first voyage.& soon sunk there was not enough lifeboats so many people died jumping in the cold freezing waters, freezing to death (this is a brief explanation on the titanic because the Halifax Explosion was so long)
- Mission Hindenburg: On May 6, 1937, the LZ 129 Hindenburg, a German passenger airship, exploded while trying to dock in New Jersey. The Hindenburg disaster killed 36 people. In the book, the Outcast blows up a Lucian airship, killing 36 Lucians. The Cahills were not able to prevent this disaster.
- Mission Hurricane: In 2005, Hurricane Katrina reached the city of New Orleans and breached its levees, flooding the city and killing over 1,800 people. The Outcast detonates a nuclear bomb off of the coast of the Netherlands in an attempt to create a tsunami and flood the country. However, the Cahills close its gates and saves the country.
- Mission Atomic: Chernobyl disaster.

== Mission Hurricane ==
Mission Hurricane is the third book in the Doublecross Series. It was written by Jenny Goebel, and was released on January 26, 2016. The cover is green, with the yellow oval saying "The 39 Clues" It also features the skyline of a modern city, most likely Rotterdam, Netherlands, a large port. It also shows lightning striking the city and frothy waves in the foreground. The preceding book was Mission Hindenburg, and the following book will be Mission Atomic, in which the Outcast will recreate the disaster at Chernobyl, Ukraine. The note at the end of the book reads: " My fellow ‘lost’ dragons: The science is sound. It will be a Level 7 event. The fire we breathe will scorch the whole world. -NH" The letter also has the Ekat symbol, which is a white dragon on a yellow crest. NH is the initials of Nathaniel Hartiford, the identity of the Outcast.

=== Plot summary ===
The book begins with Alek Spasky in the depths of the North Sea, with a captain of sailors that salvaged sunken vessels. They were known as salvors. Spasky is searching for the Kraken, a Russian submarine that had burned up and sunk into the North Sea. During the Cold War, many submarines and airplanes had crashed into the ocean, with intact nuclear bombs known as broken arrows. After Spasky and the captain come upon the Kraken, Spasky cuts the captain's umbilical, thus killing him. Meanwhile, in Lake Como, Italy, Amy Cahill reflects on how Grace Cahill was a ruthless person, although this fact was unknown to her until recently. However, a black-clad figure breaks into the villa that she is in, and she gives chase. Hamilton Holt also wakes up and chases the figure, but they are blinded by a bright light. Meanwhile, on Mount Fuiji, Japan, Sammy and Nellie order grilled cheese sandwiches to go. They start trekking up the mountain, in order to reach the Tomas stronghold there. In Jonah's villa at Lake Como, the Cahills find a paparazzo, and exchange a picture of the intruder for an embarrassing clip of Jonah. The intruder is Cora Wizard, Jonah's mom. They also receive a riddle about the upcoming disaster: "Disaster Three. Water marches on land. Inaction leads to more blood on your hands. Arrows are broken, lessons unlearned. Inert responses, power unearned. Katrina wreaked profound devastation, The same fate awaits a new coastal nation… The Gateway floods when autonomy fails, The torrent erases the Dutch king’s trail. A violent surge, a breach in the wall, The House of Orange will crumble and fall." In Attleboro, Massachusetts, the Outcast tells Mr. Berman to get rid of Saladin, the family cat. Meanwhile, on Mount Fuji, Sammy and Nellie get stuck in an avalanche and barely escape. At Lake Como, the Cahills agree to split up to fulfill their mission. Amy, Hamilton, and Jonah will go to Boston to hear Aunt Beatrice's will and try to get more information about the Outcast. Meanwhile, Ian, Cara, and Dan will go to the Netherlands and prevent the Outcast's disaster. On Mount Fuji, Nellie and Sammy come upon the Tomas stronghold, but discover that it is deserted. While that occurs, in Amsterdam, Dan goes to a museum to help them with their mission.

In 1953, a storm tide had flooded the Netherlands, killing roughly 1,800 people. Due to this, the Dutch built the Delta Works to keep out the water. Dan also learns about broken arrows, and theorizes that the Outcast will detonate one to create a tsunami. Meanwhile, in Boston, Hamilton is laughing over "Jonah Wizard’s Massive Mime Meltdown", or a video clip in which Jonah recites Shakespeare into a mirror. Amy heads over to the reading of Beatrice's will, discovering that she is the only Cahill in the room. However , Dan explains his theory to the others, and Cara confirms this with an internet search. Cara explains how over a thousand bombs were exploded by the US alone. Cara and Ian also say how King's Day is tomorrow, and which will be the day the disaster will take place. Meanwhile, back in Boston, Beatrice insults everyone in her will, and leaves everything to the Porcelain Cats are People Too Foundation. While Mr. Berman looks for Beatrice's diaries, Amy calls Jonah and Ham for backup. The group gets the diaries, and saves Saladin, who was about to be killed. She discovers the black files, or tabs about every Cahill. The trio heads to Grace's hangar to get the black files.

The group opens up the safe to the black files. Meanwhile, on Mount Fuji, Nellie and Sammy encounter Magnus Hansen, the current Tomas leader. They discover that Hansen is collecting the Tomas clues, and that the disasters are just distractions. They trap him in the stronghold, but he can easily escape. In the black files, Ham discovers that Grace purposely got his father expelled to prevent him from being Tomas leader. When the group tries to leave, Alek Spasky pierces Jonah with an emei piercer. They suppress him with bubbles, then escape. Meanwhile, in Amsterdam, it is King's Day, or Koningsdag. They meet up with top government officials at nine-thirty A.M. However, they do not believe that there is an impending disaster. But the kids learn that the Maeslantkering is controlled solely by a computer, or "autonomy". The group steals a boat and heads over to the dam. On Mount Fuji, a blizzard hinders Sammy and Nellie, and they camp out in a small snow cave. Meanwhile, Ian, Cara, and Dan make it to Rotterdam, one of the busiest seaports in the world. They find out that King Willem-Alexander is due at Rotterdam at noon, which leaves only 41 minutes. While Cara attempts to close the dam, Dan tries to warn the boats outside the dam. There are plans to restrict shipping in the area while a firework show takes place, so Dan detonates the fireworks earlier than planned. All of the ships safely come inside the dam except for a small fishing boat with engine problems. However, Dan gets them in at the last second. At noon, the North Sea erupts with the nuclear bomb explosion. However, the gates close just in time and the disaster is prevented. Meanwhile, the Outcast views the disaster from a helicopter with Magnus and the pilot. Dan discusses how he prevented the disaster with Amy on a video conference, while Amy tells of their encounter with Alek Spasky. Nellie also reveals how the Outcast is collecting the clues. Ian also tells them how he is handing leadership over to Amy and Dan, and then kisses Cara.
