= The Black Circle =

2009 novel by Patrick Carman

- The Black Circle
- Author: Patrick Carman
- Language: French, English
- Series: The 39 Clues
- Genre: Children's novel Adventure novel
- Publisher: Scholastic
- Publication date: August 11, 2009
- Publication place: United States; United Kingdom; Canada
- Media type: Print (hardcover)
- Pages: 178
- ISBN: 978-0-545-06045-5
- OCLC: 339643049
- Preceded by: Beyond the Grave
- Followed by: In Too Deep

The Black Circle is the fifth book in The 39 Clues series and is written by Patrick Carman. This book was released on August 11, 2009. The Black Circle was selected as Al Roker's book club pick.

== Plot summary ==
Amy and Dan Cahill, the protagonists of the series, try to follow a Lucian secret which was stolen by the Nazis during World War II. They also encounter the infamous Madrigals who helped them escape the Black Circle in the end. They are in the Cairo hotel when they receive a telegram. Nellie is still asleep, so they take her cell phone and leave her a note saying that they went to buy some doughnuts. But on the way to the Cairo International Airport, they are chased by Ian and Natalie Kabra, competitors in the race to find the 39 clues hidden around the world. However, they eventually lose the Kabras and find what they are looking for: the locker mentioned in the telegram. They find a glass paperweight with a key in the bottom, and it is holding down a piece of parchment with scrambled letters. They also find a box with disguises and two passports showing them with the disguises on, plus a Russian guide book with two tickets to Volgograd, Russia.

After boarding their plane, Amy and Dan unscramble the words on the parchment by adding the underlined letters in their names and find out that information about the next clue is in the following Russian cities: Volgograd, Moscow, Yekaterinburg, St. Petersburg and the following Siberian cities: Magadan and Omsk. The Clue seems to follow the murder of the last Russian Royal family, the Romanovs.

After arriving at Volgograd, Amy and Dan meet and work with the Holts, and they make an alliance with Hamilton Holt. They find a secret entrance inside the Motherland Calls(2 times the size of the Statue of Liberty) and there is a rope system and an important lead on the platform on top of very high ropes. They beat Hamilton by using an easier rope and take the package with the important lead. They discover a hint to the clue(from the package) around Rasputin, Anastasia Romanov and Alexei Romanov. They check out the cities on the list they found by the eye of the statue, leading them to the place Rasputin died. During an attack by the Kabras, the Holts alert them of a location code which guides them to a Lucian base. There, they discover who the mysterious NRR is(she sent the telegram). Nataliya Ruslanovna Radova, the only daughter of Anastasia. They also find the clue in the Amber Room, located by Nataliya. In the Amber Room, they found fake Australian passports of their parents, meaning they went on the hunt for the Clues with the fake passports but never finished. They run into Irina and the man in black. Amy and Dan hide in a coffin while he lures Irina and two Lucian agents out of the church in an attempt to help them escape.

They safely make it out of the Church on the Blood, and with Nellie on her way, Dan calls Hamilton and gives him the clue, 1 gram of melted amber. The book ends with the Holts ending their alliance with Amy and Dan.

== Reception ==
The Horn Book Magazine said, "The series still pushes credulity past the tipping point, but these installments introduce new developments (heretofore cartoonish competitors reveal hints of humanity; the sibs' stalwart nanny becomes suspicious; clues to their parents' death surface) that rejuvenate the foundering plots." Sarah Schowengerdt called the novel a "fast-paced volume" in the Cricket Media children's magazine Faces: People, Places, and Cultures, while The Darien Times said of the story, "Full of danger and intrigue—a great game of cat and mouse!

Tina Hudak of School Library Journal praised David Pittu's narration in the audiobook version of the novel. She wrote that he "does an admirable job of narrating, giving each character a distinctive voice; listeners may find the chronic raspy quality of Dan's voice wearing by the end of the story. The exaggerated voicing of the bonus material at the end of the story is reminiscent of old time radio shows."

| Preceded by Beyond the Grave by Jude Watson | The 39 Clues Series; Book 5 | Succeeded by In Too Deep by Jude Watson |
