= One False Note =

2008 Book by Gordon Korman

- One False Note
- Author: Gordon Korman
- Language: English
- Series: The 39 Clues
- Genre: Children's novel Adventure novel
- Publisher: Scholastic
- Publication date: December 2, 2008
- Publication place: United States; United Kingdom; Canada; Israel
- Media type: Print (hardcover)
- Pages: 174
- ISBN: 978-0-545-06042-4
- OCLC: 245561056
- LC Class: PZ7.K8369 One 2008
- Preceded by: The Maze of Bones
- Followed by: The Sword Thief

One False Note is the second book in The 39 Clues series. It is written by Gordon Korman, and was published by Scholastic on December 2, 2008. Following the events of The Maze of Bones, the protagonists Amy and Dan Cahill learn about Mozart and travel to Vienna, Austria to search for the second clue in the 39 Clues competition. One False Note entered the Children's Books New York Times Best Seller list at number one on December 21, 2008 and stayed on the list for children's chapter books for 12 weeks. A graphic novel adaptation by Hannah Templer was published in 2024.

== Plot summary ==
Amy, Dan, and Nellie arrive in Vienna, where they discover Mozart had a sister, Nannerl. They discover she had a diary, but it has been stolen from the museum. They conclude Jonah stole the diary, and break into his hotel room. They manage to escape with it, and after reuniting with Nellie, discover she knows enough German to translate it. However, three pages are missing.

Amy finds the complete sheet music from Paris online and plays it in the hotel lobby. A woman informs them it is a song titled "The Place Where I Was Born", and Amy realizes they need to be in Salzburg. There, they see Alistair Oh and follow him into the catacombs. They lose Alistair but notice The Man in Black. They flee further into the catacombs, eventually getting lost. They manage to find an exit, appearing in a room in St Peter's Abbey. Dan finds a list and assuming it is the complete 39 clues, takes it. This gets the attention of the monks, who chase them out of the abbey. Amy and Dan show the list of Nellie, who informs them that the list is just a recipe for Bénédictine.

Nellie discovers a homing device in Saladin's collar. They stumble onto a sleeping Alistair and plant it on him. Amy then takes what Alistair found in the catacombs—a poster for a Mozart concert in Venice.

In Venice, Amy and Dan notice Jonah and follow him to a music store. He disappears, and the siblings realize he went into a secret passage. They follow and find themselves in the Janus stronghold. They then find the missing diary pages on display and steal them. They manage to escape the Janus, hiding the pages on a yacht until they can return for them. Dan steals a gondola, and they lead the Janus away from the pages. They lose the Janus but crash into a larger yacht. When they awaken, they're in the yacht with the Kabra standing over them. Amy and Dan insist they found nothing in the Janus stronghold, so they're thrown into the canal. They return to the yacht, get the pages, and meet with Nellie.

In them, Nannerl says that she thinks Wolfgang was going crazy, as he was buying large quantities of expensive Japanese steel and going into major debt. Fidelio Racco, the man Wolfgang was buying from, was also named on the poster from the catacombs. They also find two notes written by Grace, the first of which refers to the French word "gateau", though Amy doesn't fully understand it. Unsure of the second clue, "D>HIC" they head to the Fidelio Racco museum, where they decide to play the Paris sheet music on Racco's harpsichord. They're ambushed by Ian and Natalie, who hold them at gunpoint. As Ian is playing the music, Amy realizes that the second message meant that the D5 key is rigged. Before she can get to Ian, however, he plays it, and the instrument blows up. In the chaos, Dan knocks Natalie out. Because the keyboard is still intact, Amy finishes the song, revealing a hidden passage where two katanas are visible. Dan takes them, and the siblings escape the museum as authorities arrive.

Amy realizes that the first message from Grace meant to take the letters "g", "a", and "e" from the word "gateau", leaving them with "t" and "u", the old chemical symbol for tungsten. They conclude they need to go to Tokyo, where the swords were from. Nellie books tickets. Elsewhere, Alistair meets with McIntyre, revealing that the tracking device belonged to the lawyer.

== Characters ==
- Amy Cahill
- Dan Cahill
- Nellie Gomez
- Jonah Wizard
- Broderick Wizard
- Alistair Oh
- Ian Kabra
- Natalie Kabra

== Critical reception ==
Kidsreads.com reviewed the book, claiming that a reader may find inspiration in their own life and that "Gordon Korman...has done an amazing job."

Preceded by The Maze of Bones by Rick Riordan	The 39 Clues Series; Book 2	Succeeded by The Sword Thief by Peter Lerangis
