= The Maze of Bones =

2008 novel by Rick Riordan

- The Maze of Bones
- Author: Rick Riordan
- Language: English
- Series: The 39 Clues
- Genre: Young adult fiction Adventure novel Mystery
- Publisher: Scholastic
- Publication date: September 9, 2008
- Publication place: United States
- Pages: 220
- ISBN: 978-0-545-06039-4
- OCLC: 192081902
- Followed by: One False Note

The Maze of Bones is the first novel of The 39 Clues series, written by Rick Riordan and published September 9, 2008 by Scholastic. It stars Amy and Dan Cahill, two orphans who discover, upon their grandmother Grace's death, that they are part of the powerful Cahill family, whose members constantly fight each other for Clues, which are ingredients to a mysterious serum.

The novel has received generally positive reviews. A graphic novel adaptation by Ethan Young was published in 2023.

== Story plot ==
The story begins with Grace Cahill lying on her deathbed. She requests that William McIntyre, her lawyer, change her will to the alternate version, then dies. A Man in Black then speaks with McIntyre.

Grace's grandchildren, Amy and Dan Cahill, are taken to her funeral by their legal guardian, their Aunt Beatrice. Amy and Dan run into the athletic Holt siblings Hamilton, Reagan, and Madison Holt, then speak with the wealthy Kabra siblings, Ian and Natalie. Dan also points out other familiar Cahills, such as the academic Starling triplets.

A non-random selection of many Cahills, including Amy and Dan, the Holts, the Kabras, and the Starlings, are called away to a private reading of the will. They are joined by Jonah Wizard, Beatrice Cahill, Alistair Oh, Irina Spasky, Cousin Ingrid, and Cousin Jose, among others. McIntyre shows the Cahills a video from Grace, where she offers everyone either one million dollars or a single clue. Many Cahills take the money, but Ian and Natalie are the first to take the clue. They are followed by the Holts, the Starlings, Jonah, Alistair, and Irina. Amy and Dan initially want the money, but realize Grace would want them to take the clue so they turn down their million dollars and receive a sealed manila envelope.

All seven teams open their clue, and most depart the room. McIntyre warns the Cahill siblings to "Beware the Madrigals". The siblings go to Grace's mansion and visit the library. Amy and Dan find a secret passageway in the library, where they run into Alistair. Amy finds an annotated copy of Poor Richard's Almanack, and gives it to Alistar to look at. The mansion then begins burning down, forcing the two teams to separate. Amy and Dan escape, and return home, to their au pair, Nellie Gomez. They explain everything to her, and she agrees to accompany them. They head to the Franklin Institute, where a bomb decommissions the Starling triplets.

All the teams arrive in Paris, where Irina now possesses the almanack. Jonah offers to take Amy, Dan, and Nellie to their hotel, but upon spotting Irina, Dan has the singer drop them by some random hotel. They follow Irina to a Lucian stronghold, where they steal a strange orb and discover an island worth investigating. They investigate, but find themselves in a trap. They use the device they stole from the stronghold to escape, then return to a worried Nellie. They tell her the whole truth, and she again agrees to help with whatever they need.

They go explore the catacombs, where they find a magic number box puzzle. Ian and Natalie corner them, but Alistair fights them off while Amy and Dan escape. They are led to a church, where they find a room with a mural of the original Cahills—Luke, Kathrine, Thomas, and Jane. Amy finds a small vial, commanding she charge it. Amy and Dan climb to the top of the church, where Amy successful charges it. However, Ian flies in and steals it. Dan, however, still possesses the original paper from the vial, and solves the first clue: iron solute.

More research and a further investigation of the magic number box leads Amy and Dan to turn their attention to Vienna, to investigate Wolfgang Amadeus Mozart.

== Major themes ==
The major themes of the novel are talent and power. The historical members of the Cahill family are all talented. Each branch has specific talents in a certain area; for example the Ekaterina branch is talented in the area of technology and invention. The members of each teams in the family are obviously talented or have some other edge and yet Amy and Dan are viewed as the main threats. Over the course of the book, Amy and Dan discover their own unique talents.

The premise of the series is that the person who finds the solution to the clues will come into an inordinate amount of power.

== Reception ==
The Maze of Bones met with a generally positive reviews and spawned optimism for the rest of the series. It entered the Children's Books New York Times Best Seller list at number one on September 28, 2008 and stayed on the list for children's chapter books for 24 weeks.

Publishers Weekly said it "mixes just the right proportions of suspense, perils, and puzzles" and that it was a "rollicking good read", while noting that "the story does not end so much as drop off a cliff."

School Library Journal said that "the book dazzles" and "stands solidly on its own feet and will satisfy while whetting appetites for more." Mary Quattlebaum, writing for the Washington Post, said that "though the villainous relatives are rather flat, the historical tidbits and fast-moving plot will engage readers".

Austin Grossman, writing for The New York Times, gave a generally mixed review, saying the premise for the series was "dramatic and instantly engaging", although he commented that Amy and Dan were "agreeably flawed characters but have an undeniably focus-grouped, manufactured quality – as does, let's face it, the whole book". He also found the supporting characters to be made up of stereotypes and the writing "carefully bland, as if it didn't trust its readers enough". Scholastic Parent & Child magazine also included the novel within its 100 "Greatest Books for Kids."

== See also ==
- List of The 39 Clues characters

Preceded by None	The 39 Clues Series; Book 1	Succeeded by One False Note by Gordon Korman
