= A King's Ransom =

2011 novel by Jude Watson

- Author: Jude Watson
- Language: English
- Genre: Children's novel Adventure novel
- Published: December 6, 2011
- Publisher: Scholastic
- Publication place: United States
- Pages: 192
- Preceded by: The Medusa Plot
- Followed by: The Dead of Night

A King's Ransom is the second book in the Cahills vs. Vesper's series. The book was written by Jude Watson and published on December 6, 2011. The story picks up right after the previous book and continues to follow Dan and Amy as they try to get back the kidnapped members of their family as they go on a journey to remember.

== Plot ==
The book starts with Dan and Amy Cahill, the two main characters, at a train station in Florence. Realizing that there is no way to get on the train alone they befriend a girl named Vanessa Mallory to board the train. Once on the train, Amy gets information that they have to steal the De Virga World Map, which has been lost since 1932, where it was last housed at an auction house in Lucerne. As they talk, the siblings realize that Vanessa is an imposter, and hide in the luggage compartment. The two hide there until they reach the next station at Engelberg, where they run away and call the Cahill Command Center in Attleboro. Once on the phone, Dan and Amy find out that Vanessa is actually Vesper 6, Cheyenne Wyoming. Realizing that they should start at the auction in which the De Virga was last seen, Ian Kabra tells them how to dress like they fit in at once.

After dressing up, Dan and Amy go to the auction, where they sneak into the record room and start searching for clues. As they search they see fax come in their names and faces telling people that they are wanted by INTERPOL and the detective searching for them is Milos Vanek. After being caught, the two take a photo of a document and leave. They send a copy of the photo to Ian, who tells them that the photo is a list of potential buyers. After sneaking out of the auction house, Dan and Amy meet McIntyre, who tells them that it is unsafe to remain in Lucerne. He takes them to Basel where the siblings agree on two names to investigate, Jane Sperling and Hummel.

After a little research Amy finds out that they have to go to the Neuschwanstein Castle. Meanwhile, Jonah Wizard and Hamilton Holt come in for backup. On the way to the castle, they meet Cheyenne, who is disguised as a hitchhiker. They give her a ride until Hamilton realizes who she is, and the two ditch her, and Hamilton takes her phone. The two start towards Dan and Amy, fearing that they may be attacked. During this time Dan and Amy explore the castle for clues they find another code and Casper Wyoming. Using Jonah's name to create a crowd, Dan and Amy escape.

Hamilton shows the group a lead that suggests going to The Library of Philosophy and Cosmology in Prague. At the library, Dan and Amy try to get in using Dr. Rosenbloom's credentials but fail. However, Amy gets a text from Sinead Starling, telling them that the last text from Cheyenne's phone was from Kunta Hora, a place not too far from Prague. Meanwhile, Jake and Atticus Rosenbloom find out that Dan and Amy tried to get into the library with the use of their father's credentials. Atticus remembers the day his mother died and how she told Atticus to stay friends with Dan, as Atticus is a "Guardian". Atticus pleads with Jake to go to Prague and eventually he gives in.

Dan and Amy arrive at the Sedlec Ossuary. Once there, Sinead tells them that the text that Cheyenne got was from a computer. The siblings find the computer and try to look at the files. They are only able to look at one before it starts to wipe itself. Seeing as there might be a danger, Dan and Amy leave, but before leaving they see the initials of their father AJT (Arthur Josiah Trent). Once at a hotel, Amy finds out that they have received access to the library. At the library, Dan and Amy meet Atticus and Jake, where the four agree to work together. Dan and Amy tell Jake and Atticus about Vespers and how members of their family have been kidnapped. Inside the library, they start looking through the works of Brahe and Kepler. Inside one of the books, Mysterium Cosmographicum, they find the De Virga Map. At the same time, Casper and Cheyenne are in the library. The two start a fire to take Dan and Amy out by using the library's halon gas, which removes oxygen from the air. However, Dan and Amy are saved and manage to take the map. They are unable to save Atticus.

Atticus is kidnapped and taken by the Wyomings. Meanwhile, William McIntyre is killed by a Vesper. While talking, the group finds out that the map and Il Milione point towards Samarkand, Uzbekistan.
