= The American series of The Three Investigators =

== Alfred Hitchcock and the Three Investigators in... ==
(from book 31, The Three Investigators in...)

1. The Secret of Terror Castle (1964, by Robert Arthur)
2. The Mystery of the Stuttering Parrot (1964, by Robert Arthur)
3. The Mystery of the Whispering Mummy (1965, by Robert Arthur)
4. The Mystery of the Green Ghost (1965, by Robert Arthur)
5. The Mystery of the Vanishing Treasure (1966, by Robert Arthur)
6. The Secret of Skeleton Island (1966, by Robert Arthur)
7. The Mystery of the Fiery Eye (1967, by Robert Arthur)
8. The Mystery of the Silver Spider (1967, by Robert Arthur)
9. The Mystery of the Screaming Clock (1968, by Robert Arthur)
10. The Mystery of the Moaning Cave (1968, by William Arden)
11. The Mystery of the Talking Skull (1969, by Robert Arthur)
12. The Mystery of the Laughing Shadow (1969, by William Arden)
13. The Secret of the Crooked Cat (1970, by William Arden)
14. The Mystery of the Coughing Dragon (1970, by Nick West)
15. The Mystery of the Flaming Footprints (1971, by M. V. Carey)
16. The Mystery of the Nervous Lion (1971, by Nick West)
17. The Mystery of the Singing Serpent (1972, by M. V. Carey)
18. The Mystery of the Shrinking House (1972, by William Arden)
19. The Secret of Phantom Lake (1973, by William Arden)
20. The Mystery of Monster Mountain (1973, by M. V. Carey)
21. The Secret of the Haunted Mirror (1974, by M. V. Carey)
22. The Mystery of the Dead Man's Riddle (1974, by William Arden)
23. The Mystery of the Invisible Dog (1975, by M. V. Carey)
24. The Mystery of Death Trap Mine (1976, by M. V. Carey)
25. The Mystery of the Dancing Devil (1976, by William Arden)
26. The Mystery of the Headless Horse (1977, by William Arden)
27. The Mystery of the Magic Circle (1978, by M. V. Carey)
28. The Mystery of the Deadly Double (1978, by William Arden)
29. The Mystery of the Sinister Scarecrow (1979, by M. V. Carey)
30. The Secret of Shark Reef (1979, by William Arden)
31. The Mystery of the Scar-Faced Beggar (1981, by M. V. Carey)
32. The Mystery of the Blazing Cliffs (1981, by M. V. Carey)
33. The Mystery of the Purple Pirate (1982, by William Arden)
34. The Mystery of the Wandering Cave Man (1982, by M. V. Carey)
35. The Mystery of the Kidnapped Whale (1983, by Marc Brandel)
36. The Mystery of the Missing Mermaid (1983, by M. V. Carey)
37. The Mystery of the Two-Toed Pigeon (1984, by Marc Brandel)
38. The Mystery of the Smashing Glass (1984, by William Arden)
39. The Mystery of the Trail of Terror (1984, by M. V. Carey)
40. The Mystery of the Rogues' Reunion (1985, by Marc Brandel)
41. The Mystery of the Creep-Show Crooks (1985, by M. V. Carey)
42. The Mystery of Wrecker's Rock (1986, by William Arden)
43. The Mystery of the Cranky Collector (1987, by M. V. Carey)
44. The Mystery of the Ghost Train (published in German only in 2024, by M. V. Carey; unfinished/unpublished when the original series was cancelled)

== Find Your Fate Mysteries (1985–1987) ==
- RH1 Case of the Weeping Coffin (1985, by Megan Stine and H. William Stine)
- RH2 Case of the Dancing Dinosaur (by Rose Estes)
- RH3 Case of the House of Horrors (by Megan Stine and H. William Stine)
- RH4 Case of the Savage Statue (1987, by M.V. Carey)

== Crimebusters (1989–1990) ==
1. Hot Wheels (1989, by William Arden)
2. Murder to Go (1989, by Megan Stine and H. William Stine)
3. Rough Stuff (1989, by G.H. Stone)
4. Funny Business (1989, by William MacCay)
5. An Ear for Danger (1989, by Marc Brandel)
6. Thriller Diller (1989, by Megan Stine and H. William Stine) [retitled 'Hollywood Horror' in UK]
7. Reel Trouble (1989, by G.H. Stone)
8. Shoot the Works (1990, by William MacCay)
9. Foul Play (1990, by Peter Lerangis)
10. Long Shot (1990, by Megan Stine and H. William Stine)
11. Fatal Error (1990, by G.H. Stone)
12. Brain Wash (published in German only in 2011, by Peter Lerangis)
13. High Strung (published in German only in 2011, by G.H. Stone)
