= Harry Kane (illustrator) =

American artist (1912–1988)

Harry Kane (né Kirchner; July 2, 1912 – March 1988) was a twentieth century American illustrator and artist of Russian/Jewish descent. Primarily known for his work on the children's books The Three Investigators, he had a career that spanned over 50 years, doing work on paperback covers, advertising art, men's adventure magazines, movie posters and much more.

== Early life ==
Harry Kirchner was born in Philadelphia on July 2, 1912. His parents were from Odessa; his father was a tailor. His mother died when he was five years old, and he was raised mostly by his sister.

When he was younger he would go to the zoo and draw animals. He was extremely knowledgeable about art history and contemporary art and his thirst to better his skills led him to books by Howard Pyle and NC Wyeth, which he studied closely. Kane's career began during the Great Depression when he and a few of his artist friends left Philadelphia for New York City. It was difficult to find employment during this time. However, Kane's talent was getting noticed and around 1930 and eventually opened the door to Street & Smith. One of his first paying jobs, drawing for Western Story Magazine. Kane eventually married his wife Minna and they lived in Greenwich Village. When World War II began and Kane was drafted and sent to Hawaii to be a map maker. In 1941, Harry and his wife had their first child, a son they named Eugene. They soon realized that their son was handicapped. Eugene would spend much of his life in an institution. As Kane was stationed in Hawaii, Minna was left to raise Eugene on her own. She petitioned the army to release Kane early to help with Eugene but to no avail. The war ended in 1945 and Kane returned home. Upon returning from the war, Harry and Minna saw the birth of their next child Hadiya in 1946, with another daughter, Janice, coming along not long after. In 1970 he and his wife Minna divorced. Harry spent much of his free time with his disabled son, as he refused to institutionalize him.

== Professional years ==
When Harry returned from the war he found his job was no longer waiting for him, so he began taking freelance jobs. He did work for Seagrams, Schlitz beer, Calso Gasoline Company, Phillip Morris and much more. In the mid-1960s Random House hired Harry to work on a new set of children's books called Alfred Hitchcock and The Three Investigators. Harry worked on most of the covers and interiors of the first 16 books and the series proved to be very popular selling millions of copies.

== Later years ==
In the 1980s Kane was semi-retired and living quietly until poor health forced Kane to move to a nursing home. Kane died of an aneurysm in March 1988.

== Bibliography ==
"Alfred Hitchcock and the Three Investigators" books drawn by Harry Kane:

- # 1: The Secret of Terror Castle (1964) - Cover by Ed Vebell, interiors by Harry Kane
- # 2: The Mystery of the Stuttering Parrot (1964)- Cover by Ed Vebell, interiors by Harry Kane
- # 3: The Mystery of the Whispering Mummy (1965) - Cover and interiors by Harry Kane
- # 4: The Mystery of the Green Ghost (1965) - Cover and interiors by Harry Kane
- # 5: The Mystery of the Vanishing Treasure (1966) - Cover and interiors by Harry Kane
- # 6: The Secret of Skeleton Island (1966) - Cover and interiors by Harry Kane
- # 7: The Mystery of the Fiery Eye (1967) - Cover and interiors by Harry Kane
- # 8: The Mystery of the Silver Spider (1967) - Cover and interiors by Harry Kane
- # 9: The Mystery of the Screaming Clock (1968) - Cover and interiors by Harry Kane
- # 11: The Mystery of the Talking Skull (1969) - Cover and interiors by Harry Kane
- # 12: The Mystery of the Laughing Shadow (1969) - Cover and interiors by Harry Kane
- # 13: The Secret of the Crooked Cat (1970) - Cover and interiors by Harry Kane
- # 14: The Mystery of the Coughing Dragon (1970) - Cover and interiors by Harry Kane
- # 15: The Mystery of the Flaming Footprints (1971) - Cover and interiors by Harry Kane
- # 16: The Mystery of the Nervous Lion (1971) - Cover and interiors by Harry Kane
