= German editions of the Three Investigators =

Die drei ???
- Language: German, English (translations)
- Genre: Mystery literature Juvenile literature Crime fiction Adventure fiction
- Publisher: Kosmos
- Published: Since 1993
- Media type: Print (hardcover)

Following the cancellation of the American series of The Three Investigators, the series continued in Germany and is known there under the brand name Die drei Fragezeichen or Die drei ??? (“Three question marks”). Although the German version starts with The Secret of Terror Castle, it continues through The Mystery of the Cranky Collector, then picks up with the Crimebusters series and continues on with German-language originals from there (starting at volume 56). The German-language originals started in 1993 with books by Brigitte-Johanna Henkel-Waidhofer. She wrote 16 books for Kosmos until 1996. After her era ended, several other authors continued to write in the series at the rate of six books per year (in contrast to the U.S. series, which published one new story every year or so after Robert Arthur’s death).

In Germany, the franchise has also been the source of audio plays, films, and graphic novels. The audio play series (‘Hörspiele’) Die drei ???, which has been in production since 1978, has become particularly popular.

== Die drei ??? ==
The German series adopted innovations from the Crimebusters series; for example, the Three Investigators have driving licences and own cars. It introduced new elements, including the lock pick, which Peter uses regularly. The German books often contain references to the American original series and bring back characters from it.

=== Published books ===
The bold numbers in square brackets are the chronological order these take place in the German continuity which includes the original series and Crimebusters.

1. [56] Tatort Zirkus (Crime Scene: Circus) (1993, by B. J. Henkel-Waidhofer)
2. [57] ... und der verrückte Maler (The Insane Painter) (1993, by B. J. Henkel-Waidhofer)
3. [58] Giftiges Wasser (Toxic Water) (1993, by B. J. Henkel-Waidhofer)
4. [59] Dopingmixer (Runaway Success) (1994, by B. J. Henkel-Waidhofer)
5. [60] ... und die Rache des Tigers (The Revenge of the Tiger) (1994, by B. J. Henkel-Waidhofer)
6. [61] Spuk im Hotel (Haunted Hotel) (1994, by B. J. Henkel-Waidhofer)
7. [62] Fußball-Gangster (Soccer Gangsters) (1995, by B. J. Henkel-Waidhofer)
8. [63] Geisterstadt (Ghost Town) (1995, by B. J. Henkel-Waidhofer)
9. [64] Diamantenschmuggel (Diamond Smuggling) (1995, by B. J. Henkel-Waidhofer)
10. [65] ... und die Schattenmänner (The Shadowmen) (1995, by B. J. Henkel-Waidhofer)
11. [66] Geheimnis der Särge (The Mystery of the Coffins) (1996, by B. J. Henkel-Waidhofer)
12. [67] Schatz im Bergsee (The Treasure of the Mountain Lake) (1996, by B. J. Henkel-Waidhofer)
13. [68] Späte Rache (Late Revenge) (1996, by B. J. Henkel-Waidhofer)
14. [69] Schüsse aus dem Dunkel (Shots from the Dark) (1996, by B. J. Henkel-Waidhofer)
15. [70] Die verschwundene Seglerin (The Missing Sailor) (1996, by B. J. Henkel-Waidhofer)
16. [71] Dreckiger Deal (Dirty Deal) (1996, by B. J. Henkel-Waidhofer)
17. [72] Die Spur des Raben (The Trail of the Raven) (1997, by André Marx)
18. [73] Poltergeist (Poltergeist) (1997, by André Marx)
19. [74] ... und das brennende Schwert (The Burning Sword) (1997, by André Marx)
20. [75] Pistenteufel (Slope Devil) (1997, by Ben Nevis)
21. [76] Stimmen aus dem Nichts (Voices from the Void) (1997, by André Minninger)
22. [77] Das leere Grab (The Empty Grave) (1997, by André Marx)
23. [78] Verdeckte Fouls (Hidden Fouls) (1998, by Ben Nevis)
24. [79] Im Bann des Voodoo (Voodoo Spell) (1998, by André Minninger)
25. [80] Geheimsache Ufo (Secret Matter: UFO) (1998, by André Marx)
26. [81] Meuterei auf hoher See (Mutiny at Sea) (1998, by André Marx)
27. [82] Musik des Teufels (The Devil's Music) (1998, by André Marx)
28. [83] Die Karten des Bösen (The Hand of Evil) (1998, by André Minninger)
29. [84] Wolfsgesicht (Wolf Face) (1999, by Katharina Fischer)
30. [85] Nacht in Angst (Night of Fear) (1999, by André Marx)
31. [86] Feuerturm (Tower of Fire) (1999, by Ben Nevis)
32. [87] Tödliche Spur (Deadly Trail) (1999, by André Marx)
33. [88] Vampir im Internet (Vampire on the Internet) (1999, by André Minninger)
34. [89] ... und das Geisterschiff (The Ghost Ship/The Haunted Ship) (2000, by André Marx)
35. [90] Todesflug (Flight of Death) (2000, by Ben Nevis)
36. [91] Labyrinth der Götter (Labyrinth of the Gods) (2000, by André Marx)
37. [92] ... und der rote Rächer (The Red Avenger) (2000, by Katharina Fischer)
38. [93] Das schwarze Monster (The Black Monster) (2000, by André Marx)
39. [94] Botschaft von Geisterhand (Message from a Ghost) (2000, by André Marx)
40. [95] Insektenstachel (Stinger) (2001, by André Minninger)
41. [96] Rufmord (Slander) (2001, by André Minninger)
42. [97] Tal des Schreckens (Valley of Terror/Valley of Horror) (2001, by Ben Nevis)
43. [98] Doppelte Täuschung (Double Deception) (2001, by André Marx)
44. [99] ... und das Hexenhandy (The Curse of the Cell Phone) (2001, by André Minninger)
45. [100] Toteninsel (Island of Death) (2001, by André Marx)
46. [101] Das Erbe des Meisterdiebs (The Legacy of the Master-Thief/Mysterious Testament) (2002, by André Marx)
47. [102] Gift per E-Mail (Poison By E-mail/Poisoned E-Mail) (2002, by Ben Nevis)
48. [103] ... und der Nebelberg (The Mountain of Mist) (2002, by André Marx)
49. [104] Der Mann ohne Kopf (The Man without a Head) (2002, by André Minninger)
50. [105] ... und der Schatz der Mönche (The Treasure of the Monks) (2002, by Ben Nevis)
51. [106] Die sieben Tore (The Seven Gates) (2002, by André Marx)
52. [107] Gefährliches Quiz (Dangerous Quiz/Dangerous Quiz Show (2003, by Marco Sonnleitner)
53. [108] Panik im Park (Panic in the Park) (2003, by Marco Sonnleitner)
54. [109] Die Höhle des Grauens (The Cave of Horror) (2003, by Ben Nevis)
55. [110] Das Auge des Drachen (The Eye of the Dragon) (2003, by André Marx)
56. [111] Schlucht der Dämonen (The Canyon of Demons) (2003, by Marco Sonnleitner)
57. [112] Die Villa der Toten (The Mansion of the Dead) (2003, by André Marx)
58. [113] Der Feuerteufel (Firebug) (1999, by André Marx as paperback Halloween special; released as hardback in 2004)
59. [114] Der finstere Rivale (The Sinister Rival) (2004, by André Marx)
60. [115] Codename: Cobra (Codename: Cobra) (2004, by Marco Sonnleitner)
61. [116] Auf tödlichem Kurs (On A Deadly Course) (2004, by Ben Nevis)
62. [117] Der schwarze Skorpion (The Black Scorpion) (2004, by Marco Sonnleitner)
63. [118] Das düstere Vermächtnis (The Grim Legacy) (2004, by Ben Nevis)
64. [119] Der geheime Schlüssel (The Secret Key) (2004, by André Marx)
65. [120] Spur ins Nichts (Nowhere to Go/Evil Games) (2005, by André Marx)
66. [121] ... und der Geisterzug (The Ghost Train/The Mystery of the Ghost Train) (2005, by Astrid Vollenbruch)
67. [122] Fußballfieber (Soccer Mania) (2005, by Marco Sonnleitner)
68. [123] Schrecken aus dem Moor (Terror from the Swamp) (2005, by Marco Sonnleitner)
69. [124] Geister-Canyon (Ghost Canyon) (2005, by Ben Nevis)
70. [125] Feuermond (Moon of Fire) (2005, by André Marx)
71. [126] SMS aus dem Grab (Text Message from the Grave/The Pharaoh’s Message) (2006, by Ben Nevis)
72. [127] Schwarze Madonna (Black Madonna) (2006, by Astrid Vollenbruch)
73. [128] Schatten über Hollywood (Shadow Over Hollywood/Hollywood Horrors) (2006, by Astrid Vollenbruch)
74. [129] Spuk im Netz (Web Phantom) (2006, by Astrid Vollenbruch)
75. [130] Der Fluch des Drachen (The Curse of the Dragon) (2006, by André Marx)
76. [131] Haus des Schreckens (House of Terror) (2006, by Marco Sonnleitner)
77. [132] Fluch des Piraten (The Pirate’s Curse) (2007, by Ben Nevis)
78. [133] Fels der Dämonen (Rock of the Demons) (2007, by Marco Sonnleitner)
79. [134] Der tote Mönch (The Dead Monk) (2007, by Marco Sonnleitner)
80. [135] Die geheime Treppe (The Hidden Stair) (2007, by Marco Sonnleitner)
81. [136] ... und das versunkene Dorf (The Sunken Village/Ghost Village) (2007, by André Marx)
82. [137] Pfad der Angst (Path of Fear) (2007, by Astrid Vollenbruch)
83. [138] ... und die Fußball-Falle (Soccer Case/Soccer Trap) (2008, by Marco Sonnleitner)
84. [139] Das Geheimnis der Diva (The Secret of the Diva) (2008, by Astrid Vollenbruch)
85. [140] Stadt der Vampire (Vampire City) (2008, by Marco Sonnleitner)
86. [141] Zwillinge der Finsternis (Twins of Doom) (2008, by Marco Sonnleitner)
87. [142] Tödliches Eis (Deadly Ice/Arctic Adventure) (2008, by Kari Erlhoff)
88. [143] ... und die Poker-Hölle (The Gambling Joint) (2008, by Marco Sonnleitner)
89. [144] Grusel auf Campbell Castle (Horror at Castle Campbell) (2009, by Marco Sonnleitner)
90. [145] ... und die Rache der Samurai (The Revenge of the Samurai) (2009, by Ben Nevis)
91. [146] Der Biss der Bestie (The Bite of the Beast) (2009, by Kari Erlhoff)
92. [147] Schwarze Sonne (Black Sun) (2009, by Marco Sonnleitner)
93. [148] ... und die feurige Flut (The Fiery Flood) (2009, by Kari Erlhoff)
94. [149] Der namenlose Gegner (The Nameless Foe) (2009, by Kari Erlhoff)
95. [150] Geisterbucht (Ghost Bay) (2010, by Astrid Vollenbruch)
96. [151] ... und das Fußballphantom (The Soccer Phantom) (2010, by Marco Sonnleitner)
97. [152] Skateboardfieber (Skateboard Fever) (2010, by Ben Nevis)
98. [153] Botschaft aus der Unterwelt (Message from the Underworld) (2010, by Kari Erlhoff)
99. [154] ... und der Meister des Todes (The Master of Death) (2010, by Kari Erlhoff)
100. [155] Im Netz des Drachen (In the Net of the Dragon) (2010, by Marco Sonnleitner)
101. [156] Im Zeichen der Schlangen (In the Sign of the Snakes) (2011, by Hendrik Buchna)
102. [157] Nacht der Tiger (Night of the Tigers) (2011, by Marco Sonnleitner)
103. [158] ... und der Feuergeist (The Fire Ghost) (2011, by Marco Sonnleitner)
104. [159] ... und der schreiende Nebel (The Screaming Fog) (2011, by Hendrik Buchna)
105. [160] Geheimnisvolle Botschaften (Mysterious Messages) (2011, by Christoph Dittert)
106. [161] Die blutenden Bilder (The Bleeding Pictures) (2011, by Kari Erlhoff)
107. [162] Fußball-Teufel (Soccer Devil) (2012, by Marco Sonnleitner)
108. [163] ... und der verschollene Pilot (The Missing Pilot) (2012, by Ben Nevis)
109. [164] Im Schatten des Giganten (In the Shadow of the Giant) (2012, by Kari Erlhoff)
110. [165] GPS-Gangster (GPS Gangster) (2012, by Marco Sonnleitner)
111. [166] ... und das blaue Biest (The Blue Beast) (2012, by Hendrik Buchna)
112. [167] ... und die brennende Stadt (The Burning City) (2012, by Christoph Dittert)
113. [168] ... und das Phantom aus dem Meer (The Phantom from the Sea) (2013, by Marco Sonnleitner)
114. [169] Straße des Grauens (Street of Horror) (2013, by Kari Erlhoff)
115. [170] Die Spur des Spielers (The Player’s Trace) (2013, by André Marx)
116. [171] ... und das Tuch der Toten (The Cloth of the Dead) (2013, by Marco Sonnleitner)
117. [172] ... und der Eisenmann (The Ironman) (2013, by Ben Nevis)
118. [173] Dämon der Rache (Demon of Revenge) (2013, by Hendrik Buchna)
119. [174] ... und der gestohlene Sieg (The Stolen Victory) (2014, by Marco Sonnleitner)
120. [175] Schattenwelt (Shadow World) (2014, by Christoph Dittert, Kari Erlhoff and Hendrik Buchna - each contributing one part of the story)
121. [176] Der Geist des Goldgräbers (The Ghost of the Gold Digger) (2014, by André Marx)
122. [177] Der gefiederte Schrecken (The Feathered Horror) (2014, by Christoph Dittert)
123. [178] Die Rache des Untoten (The Revenge of the Undead) (2014, by Marco Sonnleitner)
124. [179] ... und die flüsternden Puppen (The Whispering Dolls) (2015, by André Minninger)
125. [180] Im Haus des Henkers (In the Hangman’s House) (2015, by Marco Sonnleitner)
126. [181] Das Kabinett des Zauberers (The Magician’s Cabinet) (2015, by André Marx)
127. [182] ... und der letzte Song (The Last Song) (2015, by Ben Nevis)
128. [183] ... und der Hexengarten (The Witch’s Garden) (2015, by Kari Erlhoff)
129. [184] ... und das silberne Amulett (The Silver Amulet) (2016, by Marco Sonleitner)
130. [185] Insel des Vergessens (Island of Oblivion) (2016, by André Marx)
131. [186] ... und der Mann ohne Augen (The Man Without Eyes) (2016, by Christoph Dittert)
132. [187] Signale aus dem Jenseits (Signals from the Beyond) (2016, by André Minninger)
133. [188] ... und der unsichtbare Passagier (The Invisible Passenger) (2016, by Hendrik Buchna)
134. [189] ... und die Kammer der Rätsel (The Chamber of Riddles) (2016, by Ben Nevis)
135. [190] Verbrechen im Nichts (Crime in Nowhere) (2017, by Kari Erlhoff)
136. [191] Im Bann des Drachen (Under the Spell of the Dragon) (2017, by Christoph Dittert)
137. [192] Schrecken aus der Tiefe (Fright from the Depths) (2017, by Marco Sonnleitner)
138. [193] ... und die Zeitreisende (The Time Traveler) (2017, by André Minninger)
139. [194] Im Reich der Ungeheuer (In the Realm of Monsters) (2017, by Hendrik Buchna)
140. [195] Geheimnis des Bauchredners (Secret of the Ventriloquist) (2017, by André Marx)
141. [196] ... und der grüne Kobold (The Green Goblin) (2018, by Marco Sonnleitner)
142. [197] Im Auge des Sturms (In the Eye of the Storm) (2018, by Kari Erlhoff)
143. [198] Die Legende der Gaukler (The Legend of the Jugglers) (2018, by Christoph Dittert)
144. [199] Höhenangst (Vertigo) (2018, by André Minninger)
145. [200] Feuriges Auge (Fiery Eye) (2018, by André Marx)
146. [201] Das weiße Grab (The White Grave) (2018, by Ben Nevis)
147. [202] Tauchgang ins Ungewisse (Dive Into the Unknown) (2019, by Kari Erlhoff)
148. [203] Der dunkle Wächter (The Dark Guardian) (2019, by Ben Nevis)
149. [204] Das rätselhafte Erbe (The Mysterious Legacy) (2019, by Marco Sonnleitner)
150. [205] ... und der Mottenmann (The Mothman) (2019, by Christoph Dittert)
151. [206] Die falschen Detektive (The Fake Detectives) (2019, by Ben Nevis)
152. [207] Kreaturen der Nacht (Creatures of the Night) (2020, by Marco Sonnleitner
153. [208] ... und die schweigende Grotte (The Silent Grotto) (2020, by Christoph Dittert
154. [209] Kelch des Schicksals (The Cup of Fate) (2020, by Kari Erlhoff
155. [210] ... und der Jadekönig (The Jade King) (2020, by André Marx)
156. [211] Der Fluch der Medusa (The Medusa’s Curse) (2020, by Marco Sonnleitner)
157. [212] ... und der weiße Leopard (The White Leopard) (2020, by Hendrik Buchna)
158. [213] ... und der Geisterbunker (The Ghostbunker) (2021, by Ben Nevis)
159. [214] ... und die verlorene Zeit (The Lost Time) (2021, by Christoph Dittert)
160. [215] Die Schwingen des Unheils (The Wings of Mischief) (2021, by Hendrik Buchna)
161. [216] ... und der Kristallschädel (The Crystal Skull) (2021, by André Marx)
162. [217] Im Netz der Lügen (In the Net of Lies) (2021, by Kari Erlhoff)
163. [218] ... und die Teufelsklippe (The Devil’s Cliff) (2022, by Ben Nevis)
164. [219] Manuskript des Satans (Manuscript of Satan) (2022, by Hendrik Buchna)
165. [220] Im Wald der Gefahren (In the Forest of Dangers) (2022, by André Marx)
166. [221] ... und der Knochenmann (The Bone Man) (2022, by Marco Sonnleitner)
167. [222] ... und die Gesetzlosen (The Outlaws) (2022, by Kari Erlhoff)
168. [223] Die Yacht des Verrats (The Yacht of Betrayal) (2022, by Ben Nevis)
169. [224] Die Spur der Toten (The Traces of the Dead) (2023, by André Minninger)
170. [225] ... und der Puppenmacher (The Doll Maker) (2023, by André Marx)
171. [226] Melodie der Rache (Melody of Revenge) (2023, by Christoph Dittert)
172. [227] Drehbuch der Täuschung (Script of Deception) (2023, by Hendrik Buchna)
173. [228] Der Tag der Toten (The Day of the Dead) (2023, by Marco Sonnleitner)
174. [229] Der Ruf der Krähen (The Call of the Crows) (2023, by André Minninger)
175. [230] Der dreiäugige Schakal (The Three-Eyed Jackal) (2024, by Ben Nevis)
176. [231] Die Stadt aus Gold (The City of Gold) (2024, by Christoph Dittert)
177. [232] Die Nacht der Gewitter (The Night of the Thunderstorms) (2024, by Marco Sonnleitner)
178. [233] Das Fantasmofon (The Fantasmophone) (2024, by Kari Erlhoff)
179. [234] Im Bann des Barrakudas (Under the Spell of the Barracuda) (2024, by Hendrik Buchna)
180. [235] Der lebende Tresor (The Living Safe) (2024, by André Minninger)
181. [236] Der rote Büffel (The Red Buffalo) (2025, by André Marx)
182. [237] Falsche Schuld (False Guilt) (2025, by Ben Nevis)
183. [238] Das Geheimnis der sieben Palmen (The Secret of the Seven Palms) (2025, by Marco Sonnleitner)
184. [239] Meister des Lichts (Master of the Light) (2025, by Christoph Dittert)
185. [240] Die schwarze Rose (The Black Rose) (2025, by Ben Nevis)
186. [241] Das weiße Auge (The White Eye) (2025, by Marco Sonnleitner)
187. [242] Das Lied der Knochenflöte (The Song of the Bone Flute) (2026, by Kari Erlhoff)
188. [243] Rätsel des Mondes (Mysteries of the Moon) (2026, by Hendrik Buchna)
189. [244] Fußball-Skandal (Soccer Scandal) (2026, by Christoph Dittert)
190. [245] Spuk in Hollywood (Haunting in Hollywood) (2026, by Fritz Schaefer)
191. [246] Unter Verdacht (Under Suspicion) (2026, by Marco Sonnleitner)
192. [247] Im Griff der Sandgeister (In the Grip of the Sand Spirits) (2026, by Christoph Dittert)

Specials:

1. Die Geisterlampe (The Spirit Lamp) (2011, Kari Erlhoff, Marco Sonnleitner and Hendrik Buchna each contribute 4 short stories)
2. Top Secret Edition (2011, Peter Lerangis and G.H. Stone each contribute one previously unpublished Crimebusters story, and Megan & H.W. Stine contribute the Find Your Fate Mystery House Of Horrors. These stories are all printed in German and are listed under the American series)
3. Der dreiTag (The Three-Day) (2011, Hendrik Buchna, Tim Wenderoth and Ivar Leon Menger each contribute one part of the story)
4. Das Rätsel der Sieben (The Mystery of the Seven) (2012, Hendrik Buchna, Christoph Dittert, Kari Erlhoff, André Marx, André Minninger, Ben Nevis and Marco Sonnleitner each contribute a short story)
5. Der 5. Advent (The 5th Advent Sunday) (2013, by André Minninger - featuring 24 color illustrations by regular cover artist Silvia Christoph; Christmas special)
6. Der Zeitgeist (The Spirit of the Times) (2014, Marco Sonnleitner, Hendrik Buchna, André Marx, André Minninger, Ben Nevis and Christoph Dittert each contribute a short story)
7. Sinfonie der Angst (Symphony of Fear) (2014, by Kari Erlhoff and Kai Schwind - 50th Anniversary special)
8. Top Secret Edition 2 (2014, 'Shoot The Works - Im Visier' by William MacCay (Crimebusters story previously unpublished in Germany), 'Savage Statue - Grausame Göttin' by M.V. Carey (Find Your Fate Mystery previously unpublished in Germany), and 'Das versunkene Schiff' (The Sunken Ship) by Andre Marx taken from an unpublished manuscript of his from the 1990s)
9. Stille Nacht, düstere Nacht (Silent Night, Dark Night) (2015, by Hendrik Buchna - Christmas Special)
10. Der dreiäugige Totenkopf (The Three-eyed Skull) (2015, by Ivar Leon Menger und John Beckmann - graphic novel)
11. Das Grab der Maya (Grave of the Maya) (2016, by André Marx - with closed pages from the villains' point of view)
12. Der schwarze Tag (The Black Day) (2017, by Hendrik Buchna, Christoph Dittert, Kari Erlhoff, André Minninger, Ben Nevis and Marco Sonnleitner each contribute a short story)
13. Das Dorf der Teufel (The Village of Devils) (2017, by Ivar Leon Menger, John Beckmann and Christopher Tauber; graphic novel)
14. Bobs Archiv: Der Fall Marty Fielding (Bobs Archive: The Case Marty Fielding) (2017, by Christoph Dittert; 24 Folders in one Slipcase)
15. O du finstere (O You Sinister) (2019, by Hendrik Buchna; A Christmas Mystery in 24 Chapters)
16. Die Totenkopfbucht (The Skull Bay) (2019, by Marco Sonnleitner; A Case with Sealed Pages)
17. ... und der dunkle Taipan (The Dark Taipan) (2019, by Hendrik Buchna)
18. Der verrückte Professor (The Crazy Professor) (2020, by Cally Stronk and Christian Friedrich; A Exit Mystery)
19. Rocky Beach – Eine Interpretation (Rocky Beach - A Interpretation) (2020, by Christopher Tauber and Hanna Wenzel; graphic novel)
20. Justus Jonas – Eine Interpretation (Justus Jonas - A Interpretation) (2025, by Christopher Tauber and Marius Pawlitza; graphic novel)
21. Die Auferstehung (The Resurrection) (2025, by Andreas Eschbach; novel)

== Dein Fall! (2012–) ==
Translates as 'Your Case!', these are Choose Your Own Adventure–style interactive books.

1. Tödlicher Dreh (Fatal Shooting) (2012, by Marco Sonnleitner)
2. Hotel der Diebe (Hotel of Thieves) (2013, by Christoph Dittert)
3. Die weiße Anakonda (The White Anaconda) (2014, by Michael Kühlen)
4. Höllenfahrt (Descent Into Hell) (2015, by Christoph Dittert)
5. Das Rätsel der Smart City (The Riddle of Smart City) (2016, by Christoph Dittert)
6. Wüstenfieber (Desert Fever) (2018, by Evelyn Boyd)
7. Teuflisches Foul (Devilish Foul) (2020, by Evelyn Boyd)
8. ... und die Gefängnisinsel (... and the Prison Island) (2022, by Evelyn Boyd)
9. ... und der schwarze Fluch (... and the Black Curse) (2024, by Andreas Ruch)

== MIDI Format books (2013) ==
In 2013, Kosmos published a new set of smaller sized books. These perfect-bound paperbacks are written by Christoph Dittert and are 144 pages long, with dimensions 14.4 × 10 cm.

1. Das Grab der Inka-Mumie (The Tomb of the Inca Mummy)
2. Der Tornadojäger (The Tornado Chaser)
3. Das kalte Auge (The Cold Eye)

== German American-English series (2005–2011) ==
In 2005, the German publisher Kosmos started a new series of stories in English, translated from the original German titles. The Three Investigators have their German names in these books, and they are not referred to as "The Three Investigators," but as "Die Drei ???" (literally, "The Three Question Marks"). (Original German titles in italics)

1. The Curse of the Cell Phone (Hexenhandy) (2001 / 2005, by André Minninger)
2. Poisoned E-mail (Gift per E-Mail) (2002 / 2005, by Ben Nevis)
3. Soccer Mania (Fußballfieber) (2005 / 2006, by Marco Sonnleitner)
4. The Haunted Ship (Das Geisterschiff) (2000 / 2006, by André Marx)
5. Valley of Horror (Tal des Schreckens) (2001 / 2007, by Ben Nevis)
6. The Mystery of the Ghost Train (Der Geisterzug) (2005 / 2007, by Astrid Vollenbruch)
7. Hidden Fouls (Verdeckte Fouls) (1998 / 2008, by Ben Nevis)
8. The Pirate's Curse (Fluch des Piraten) (2007 / 2008, by Ben Nevis)
9. Web Phantom (Spuk im Netz) (2006 / 2009, by Astrid Vollenbruch)
10. The Pharaoh's Message (SMS aus dem Grab) (2006 / 2009, by Ben Nevis)
11. Soccer Trap (Fußball-Falle) (2008 / 2010, by Marco Sonnleitner)
12. Ghost Village (Das versunkene Dorf) (2007 / 2010, by André Marx)
13. Hollywood Horrors (Schatten über Hollywood) (2006 / 2011, by Astrid Vollenbruch)
14. Evil Games (Spur ins Nichts) (2005 / 2011, by André Marx)

== German British-English Pons Die drei ??? series (2009–2011) ==
These British-English translations include an abridged version of the original story both in German and English, plus a vocabulary part and grammar exercises. Accompanying the books are CDs containing narrated audio versions of the English texts. These books refer to the protagonists as "The Three Investigators," not "Die drei ???" as in the American-English editions.

1. Arctic Adventure (Tödliches Eis) (2008 / 2009, by Kari Erlhoff)
2. Mysterious Testament (Das Erbe des Meisterdiebs) (2002 / 2009, by André Marx)
3. Vampire City (Stadt der Vampire) (2008 / 2009, by Marco Sonnleitner)
4. Dangerous Quiz Show (Gefährliches Quiz) (2003 / 2009, by Marco Sonnleitner)
5. Black Madonna (Schwarze Madonna) (2006 / 2009, by Astrid Vollenbruch)
6. Soccer Gangsters (Fußball-Gangster) (1995 / 2009, by Brigitte-Johanna Henkel-Waidhofer)
7. Canyon of Demons (Schlucht der Dämonen) (2003 / 2010, by Marco Sonnleitner)
8. Bite of the Beast (Der Biss der Bestie) (2009 / 2010, by Kari Erlhoff)
9. Master of Death (Der Meister des Todes) (2010 / 2011, by Kari Erlhoff)

== Die drei ??? audio play series (since 1979) ==
The audio play series has been in production since 1978. Initially, the original American books were adapted. The first nine episodes were released in 1979 by the label Europa. After the American series were adapted, the German books followed. To date, more than 240 episodes have been released, along with several specials. Die drei ??? is considered the most successful audio play series in the world.

== Die drei ??? Kids (The Three Investigators Kids) series (since 1999) ==
In this series, the Three Investigators are 10 years old, thus making it a kind of prequel to the original series. Their headquarters is a water tank close to Rocky Beach nicknamed "Coffee Pot", which was once used to fill up locomotives. Joining the recurring cast are Mr. Porter, Rocky Beach's general dealer, Harbor Master Ernesto Porto, and Giovanni, who runs an ice cream parlor. Another difference to the original series is that Bud Norris, Skinner's father, operates a shady bar in the city center.

1. Panik im Paradies (Panic in Paradise) (1999, by Ulf Blanck)
2. Radio Rocky Beach (Radio Rocky Beach) (1999, by Ulf Blanck)
3. Invasion der Fliegen (Invasion of the Flies) (1999, by Ulf Blanck)
4. Chaos vor der Kamera (Chaos on the Camera) (2000, by Ulf Blanck)
5. Flucht in die Zukunft (Escape to the Future) (2000, by Ulf Blanck)
6. Gefahr im Gruselgarten (Danger in the Spooky Garden) (2000, by Ulf Blanck)
7. Gruft der Piraten (Crypt of the Pirates) (2000, by Ulf Blanck)
8. Nacht unter Wölfen (Night between Wolves) (2001, by Ulf Blanck)
9. S.O.S. über den Wolken (S.O.S. above the Clouds) (2001, by Ulf Blanck)
10. Spuk in Rocky Beach (Spook in Rocky Beach) (2001, by Ulf Blanck)
11. Fluch des Goldes (Curse of the Gold) (2001, by Ulf Blanck)
12. Internetpiraten (Pirates of the Internet) (2002, by Ulf Blanck)
13. Im Reich der Rätsel (In the Empire of Riddles) (2002, by Ulf Blanck)
14. Gefahr aus dem All (Danger from Outer Space) (2002, by Ulf Blanck)
15. In der Geisterstadt (In the Ghost Town) (2003, by Ulf Blanck)
16. Der magische Brunnen (The Magic Well) (2003, by Ulf Blanck)
17. Rettet Atlantis! (Save Atlantis!) (2003, by Ulf Blanck)
18. Mission Maulwurf (Mission Mole) (2004, by Ulf Blanck)
19. Spur in die Wildnis (Trail into the Wilderness) (2004, by Ulf Blanck)
20. Die Schmugglerinsel (The Island of the Smugglers) (2004, by Ulf Blanck)
21. Die Geisterjäger (The Ghost Hunters) (2004, by Ulf Blanck)
22. Einarmige Banditen (One-armed Bandits) (2005, by Ulf Blanck)
23. Feuer in Rocky Beach (Fire in Rocky Beach) (2005, by Ulf Blanck)
24. Im Banne des Zauberers (In the Ban of the Magician) (2005, by Ulf Blanck)
25. In letzter Sekunde (In the Last Second) (2005, by Boris Pfeiffer)
26. Fußball-Alarm (Soccer-Alert) (2006, by Ulf Blanck)
27. Die Schokofalle (The Chocolate Trap) (2006, by Boris Pfeiffer)
28. Diamantenjagd (Diamond Hunt) (2006, by Boris Pfeiffer)
29. Monsterpilze (Monster Mushrooms) (2006, by Ulf Blanck)
30. Im Geisterschiff (In the Ghost Ship) (2007, by Ulf Blanck)
31. Rückkehr der Saurier (Return of the Dinosaurs) (2007, by Boris Pfeiffer)
32. Die Gruselfalle (The Spooky Trap) (2007, by Boris Pfeiffer)
33. Nacht im Kerker (Night in the Dungeon) (2007, by Ulf Blanck)
34. Falsches Gold (False Gold) (2008, by Boris Pfeiffer)
35. Im Wilden Westen (In the Wild West) (2008, by Ulf Blanck)
36. Mission Mars (Mission Mars) (2008, by Boris Pfeiffer)
37. Der Fluch der Indianer (The Curse of the Indians) (2008, by Ben Nevis)
38. Stunde der Wahrheit (Hour of Truth) (2009, by Boris Pfeiffer)
39. Der verrückte Professor (The Nutty Professor) (2009, by Ulf Blanck)
40. Brennendes Eis (Burning Ice) (2009, by Boris Pfeiffer)
41. Insel der Haie (Island of the Sharks) (2009, by Boris Pfeiffer)
42. Fußballgötter (Soccer Gods) (2010, by Boris Pfeiffer)
43. Duell der Ritter (Duel of the Knights) (2010, by Ulf Blanck)
44. Monster in Rocky Beach (Monster in Rocky Beach) (2010, by Ben Nevis)
45. Ein Fall für Superhelden (A Case for Superheroes) (2010, by Ulf Blanck)
46. Jagd auf das Dino-Ei (Hunting for the Dinosaur Egg) (2011, by Ulf Blanck)
47. Falsche Fußball-Freunde (Fake Soccer Friends) (2011, by Boris Pfeiffer)
48. Tanz der Skelette (Dance of the Skeletons) (2011, by Boris Pfeiffer)
49. Der singende Geist (The Singing Ghost) (2011, by Ulf Blanck and Boris Pfeiffer)
50. Schatz der Piraten (The Pirate's Treasure) (2012, by Boris Pfeiffer)
51. Tatort Kletterpark (Crime Scene National Park) (2012, by Ulf Blanck)
52. Mächtige Magier (Powerful Magicians) (2012, by Boris Pfeiffer)
53. Geheimnis der Tiere (Secret of the Animals) (2012, by Ulf Blanck)
54. Zombie-Alarm (Zombie Alert) (2013, by Ben Nevis)
55. Der schwarze Joker (The Black Joker) (2013, by Boris Pfeiffer)
56. Das Rätsel der Könige (The Mystery of the Kings) (2013, by Ulf Blanck)
57. Der Weihnachtsdieb (The Christmas Thief) (2013, by Boris Pfeiffer and Ulf Blanck)
58. Spur des Drachen (Trail of the Dragon) (2014, by Ulf Blanck)
59. Fußballhelden (Soccer Heroes) (2014, by Boris Pfeiffer)
60. Gespensterjagd (Ghost Hunting) (2014, by Ulf Blanck)
61. Alarm im Dino-Park (Alarm in the Dinosaur Park) (2014, by Boris Pfeiffer)
62. Gefahr im Dschungel (Danger in the Jungle) (2015, by Ulf Blanck)
63. Monster-Wolken (Monster Clouds) (2015, by Boris Pfeiffer)
64. In der Schatzhöle (In the Treasure Cove) (2015, by Boris Pfeiffer)
65. Mission Goldhund (Mission Golden Dog) (2015, by Ulf Blanck)
66. Geheimnis im Meer (Secret in the Sea) (2016, by Ulf Blanck)
67. Der goldene Drachen (The golden Dragon) (2016, by Boris Pfeiffer)
68. Chaos im Dunkeln (Chaos in the Dark) (2016, Ulf Blanck)
69. Die Rätselfalle (The Riddle Trap) (2016, by Boris Pfeiffer)
70. Aufbruch ins All (Departure to Space) (2017, by Boris Pfeiffer)
71. Tatort Trampolin (Crime Scene Trampoline) (2017, by Ulf Blanck)
72. Die Laser-Falle (The Laser Trap) (2017, by Boris Pfeiffer)
73. Surfstrand in Gefahr (Surfing Beach in Danger) (2017, by Ulf Blanck)
74. Das Schienen-Monster (The Rail Monster) (2018, by Boris Pfeiffer)
75. Der Fußball-Roboter (The Soccer Robot) (2018, by Ulf Blanck)
76. Blinde Passagiere (Stowaways) (2018, by Ulf Blanck)
77. Musikdiebe (Music Thieves) (2018, by Boris Pfeiffer)
78. Schrottplatz in Gefahr (Junkyard in Danger) (2019, by Ulf Blanck)
79. Achtung, Abenteuer! (Watch out, Adventure!) (2019, by Boris Pfeiffer)
80. Gefährlicher Nebel (Dangerous Fog) (2019, by Ulf Blanck)
81. Turbo-Rennen (Turbo Race) (2019, by Boris Pfeiffer)
82. Die Delfin-Piraten (The Dolphin Pirates) (2020, by Ulf Blanck)
83. Fußball-Diebe (Soccer Thieves) (2020, by Boris Pfeiffer)
84. Tatort Skater-Park (Crime Scene Skatepark) (2020, by Ulf Blanck)
85. Falscher Alarm (False Alarm) (2020, by Boris Pfeiffer)
86. Riesen in Rocky Beach (Giants in Rocky Beach) (2021, by Ulf Blanck)
87. Das Geisterspiel (The Ghost Game) (2021, by Boris Pfeiffer)
88. Schatz aus dem All (Treasure from Space) (2021, by Ulf Blanck)
89. Im Geistergarten (In The Ghost Garden) (2021, by Boris Pfeiffer)
90. Flug ins Nichts (Flight to Nothing) (2022, by Ulf Blanck)
91. Gefahr im Spiegelkabinett (Danger in the House of Mirrors) (2022, by Boris Pfeiffer)
92. Spuk im Leuchtturm (Spook in the Light House) (2022, by Ulf Blanck)
93. Die Geistermühle (The Ghost Mill) (2022, by Boris Pfeiffer)
94. Falsche Vampire (Fake Vampires) (2023, by Ulf Blanck)
95. Geheime Zeichen (Secret Signs) (2023, by Boris Pfeiffer)
96. Der Schrottkönig (The Scrap King) (2023, by Ulf Blanck)
97. Die Fragezeichen-Falle (The Question Mark Trap) (2023, by Boris Pfeiffer)
98. Die Geisterpferde (The Ghost horses) (2024, by Ulf Blanck)
99. Die Football-Falle (The Football Trap) (2024, by Boris Pfeiffer)
100. 100 Stunden (100 Hours) (2024, by Ulf Blanck)
101. Geistermusik (Ghost music) (2024, by Boris Pfeiffer)
