= Storm Warning (Park novel) =

2010 novel by Linda Sue Park

- Storm Warning
- Author: Linda Sue Park
- Cover artist: John Smith
- Language: English
- Series: The 39 Clues
- Genre: Children's novel Adventure novel
- Publisher: Scholastic
- Publication date: May 25, 2010
- Publication place: USA
- Media type: Print (hardcover)
- Pages: 190
- ISBN: 978-0-545-06049-3
- OCLC: 317919012
- Preceded by: The Emperor's Code
- Followed by: Into the Gauntlet

Storm Warning is the ninth book in The 39 Clues series. It is written by Linda Sue Park and was released on May 25, 2010. The geographical coordinates that appear on the ship on the book's cover (18 degrees, 15 minutes north; 77 degrees, 30 minutes west) indicate a point about six kilometers southeast of Albert Town, Jamaica.

The cover and title was revealed April 5, 2010, by Entertainment Weekly.

== Plot ==
As they were leaving China, Amy and Dan get a call from the Holts telling them that they knew where they were going. Dan and Amy assume Nellie Gomez, their au pair, told the Holts. On the plane, Dan and Amy get Nellie to give them some information. It turns out it wasn't Beatrice who hired her, but Grace. Nellie also tells them that she works for Mr. McIntyre, but does not tell them who she really works for. Amy and Dan become suspicious of her and try to avoid her as much as possible.

As events in the Caribbean take place, Amy and Dan watch as the clue hunt kills a non-Cahill named Lester. Angry and in shock, Amy and Dan decide to face Aunt Beatrice, but Nellie kidnaps them, and takes them to Moore Town to meet The Man In Black. They are then forced to solve a puzzle box that Amy and Dan had found in the museum that Lester had worked at, finding slots that fit different items representing the branches: a jade with a dragon on it, a bear claw found in a cave, a wolf tooth on Isabel Kabra's bracelet, and the snake-shaped nose ring that Nellie wears. After solving Anne Bonny's puzzle box, getting the Madrigal clue of Mace, and the knowledge that they should go to England, Dan and Amy learn that The Man In Black, who followed them in the first few books in the series, is Fiske Cahill, Grace's brother. He ran away as a kid, and that's why Amy and Dan never heard of him.

He tells them Madeleine Cahill's story: Gideon Cahill was trying to find the cure for the plague, and he did, but Gideon didn't know that the cure, which was a serum, altered the user's DNA, giving the users greater abilities in every area of human endeavor. Gideon gave each of his four children a part of the master serum. Soon afterwards, Gideon dies in a fire. The children blamed each other, and separated to start their individual branch. Luke started the Lucians; his sister, Katherine, started the Ekaterina; her brother Thomas started the Tomas; and his sister, Jane, started the Janus. But no one else knew that Gideon's wife, Olivia, was pregnant when Gideon died and her family was separated. Pregnant with Madeleine Cahill, founder of the Madrigals, Olivia raised Madeleine to believe nothing was more important than family. So that is the Madrigals' goal - to reunite the family members. Fiske Cahill also tells them that the Lucians framed Arthur and Hope Cahill for murder in South Africa. Hired by Grace, Nellie was spying for Fiske, so the branch would know about Amy and Dan in order to grant them a Madrigal status. Before leaving, Fiske reveals this to Amy and Dan. For the first time ever, the Madrigals also give active status to someone not born in the bloodline: Nellie Gomez. Amy and Dan also become members, revealed in the end of book 7, The Viper's Nest. Amy and Dan are then given seven of the other Madrigal clues, Pepper, Copper, Vinegar, Rosemary, and Lily, and head to England to search for the next clue.

Preceded by The Emperor's Code by Gordon Korman	The 39 Clues Series; Book 9	Succeeded by Into the Gauntlet by Margaret Peterson Haddix
