= Europa (record label) =

German radio play label

Europa (styled as EUROPA) is a German record label, originally owned by Miller International Records Company (Germany). It has since belonged to the MCA Inc. and Bertelsmann Music Group, and is now owned by Sony Corporation of America. It was once well known for its very successful radio plays for children and young people. The founder of Europa, American ex-pat David L. Miller, is best known outside of Germany for creating 101 Strings.

== History of the Europa label ==
- 1956: The Miller International Record Company is formed by David L. Miller, Wilhelm Wille and Andreas Erich Beurmann in Quickborn near Hamburg. They will create the label Europa. Their aim is to produce low-cost language courses, classical music and Background music. They also produce an LP of fairy tales of the Brothers Grimm, narrated by Hans Paetsch. This would become the foundation-stone of Europa's success as a record label.
- 1958: Miller International inaugurates a stereo label, called Stereo-Fidelity.
- 1966: Europa-Kinderserie is born and the first radio plays are produced, featuring fairy tales and adventure stories. Such radio plays are rare at the time, and the label only has moderate success.
- 1980s: Europa produce H. G. Francis's films. Douglas Welbat is responsible for the film scripts of the series Macabros and Larry Brent.

=== Directors ===
There have been four directors of the label:

1. 1966-1968 - the era of Sieglinde Dziallas. Dziallas, was the friend of Berumann, the joint founder. He used the alias Claudius Brac during the first years. During Dziallas' tenure, Beurmann attracted many more Hamburg stage actors to record the radio plays, including Hans Paetsch, Benno Gellenbeck, Peter Folken, Horst Fleck and Marga Massberg.
2. 1968-1972 - the era of Konrad Halver. In 1968, Dziallas suddenly died, and Beurmann withdrew from active production of the radio plays. Halver wrote and directed films and produced radio plays of Karl May's Winnetou novels. Altogether Halver produced about 75 radio plays.
3. 1972-1973 - the era of Dagmar von Kurmin. In 1972, Halver left Europa, and for a short time von Kurmin oversaw the production of some 15 radio plays, including some by Karl May and Moby-Dick by Herman Melville.
4. 1973–present - the era of Heikedine Körting. Under Körting's direction many series have been produced, including Edgar Wallace, The three investigators, TKKG, Sherlock Holmes, Commander Perkins, Perry Rhodan, Die Funk-Füchse and Die Gruselserie. Since end of the 1990s, André Minninger has also produced the radio plays. Minninger is also the author of some of the German Three investigators Novels. Some of the radio plays produced during Körting's tenure have received gold and platinum discs.

=== Carsten Bohn controversy ===
A further success guarantor was the music of Carsten Bohn. Bohn felt that he was not sufficiently paid for his compositions and a legal dispute ensued. As a consequence, the Europa label has been unable to use his compositions since the mid-1980s.

=== Decline and renaissance ===
At the end of the 1980s, bad sales figures caused radio play production to slow down. The main reason cited for the declining sales was that children and young people were no longer interested in radio plays, preferring instead to play computer games. At the beginning of the 1990s, the two series The three investigators and TKKG were essentially all that Europa produced. However, from end of the 1990s, radio plays have experienced a renaissance. With the rise of the Internet, there has been new interest in the old radio plays, and demand for new productions has also risen strongly. Increased sales of tapes and LPs provided a revenue stream which made a renewed radio play boom possible. Beginning in 2000, Europa presented the old radio plays under the slogan "Rückkehr der Klassiker" ("Return of the classics"). In addition there was a renewed interest in The three investigators, considered the label's flagship product. New series were produced, aimed at young listeners. In 2006, the series Teufelskicker was produced: an official licensed product of the Football World Cup.

== See also ==
- List of record labels
