= In Too Deep =

In Too Deep may refer to:

== Film and television ==
- In Too Deep (1989 film), an Australian erotic thriller film
- In Too Deep (1999 film), an American crime thriller film
- Degrassi: In Too Deep, the U.S. DVD title for the final 12 episodes of season 10 of Degrassi

== Literature ==
- In Too Deep (Watson novel), a 2009 39 Clues novel by Jude Watson
- In Too Deep (Child novel), a 2024 Jack Reacher novel by Lee Child and Andrew Child
- In Too Deep, a 2010 Robyn Hunter novel by Norah McClintock
- In Too Deep, a 2011 Arcane Society novel by Jayne Ann Krentz
- In Too Deep: BP and the Drilling Race that Brought it Down, a book by Alison Fitzgerald and Stanley Reed

== Music ==
=== Albums ===
- In Too Deep (John Paul Young album) or the title song, 2006
- In Too Deep (soundtrack) or the title song by Nas and Nature, from the 1999 film

=== Songs ===
- "In Too Deep" (Dead or Alive song), 1985
- "In Too Deep" (Genesis song), 1986
- "In Too Deep" (Jenny Morris song), 1995; covered by Belinda Carlisle, 1996
- "In Too Deep" (Sum 41 song), 2001
- "In Too Deep" (Tijana Bogićević song), representing Serbia at Eurovision 2017
- "In Too Deep", by Derek St. Holmes, 2000
- "In Too Deep", by Eminem from Music to Be Murdered By, 2020
- "In Too Deep", by Lost Frequencies from Less Is More, 2016
- "In Too Deep", by S Club from Seeing Double, 2002
- "In Too Deep", by the Sweeplings, 2016
- "In Too Deep", by Why Don't We from 8 Letters, 2018
- "In Too Deep", by Trippie Redd from A Love Letter to You 2, 2017

== See also ==
- "N 2 Deep", a 2021 song by Drake
- In Deep (disambiguation)
- In the Deep (disambiguation)
