= In Too Deep (Watson novel) =

2009 novel by Jude Watson

- In Too Deep
- Author: Jude Watson
- Cover artist: Catie Alexander
- Language: English
- Series: The 39 Clues
- Genre: Children's novel Adventure novel
- Publisher: Scholastic
- Publication date: November 3, 2009
- Publication place: United States; United Kingdom; Canada
- Media type: Print (hardcover)
- Pages: 206
- ISBN: 978-0-545-06046-2
- Preceded by: The Black Circle
- Followed by: The Viper's Nest

In Too Deep is the sixth book in The 39 Clues series. It was written by Jude Watson and released on November 3, 2009. The story is set in Australia and Indonesia.

== Plot summary ==
Amy and Dan have to decide how much they're willing to risk, and what they are. Ian and Natalie Kabra's mother, Isabel, joins the hunt, as she could not stand the mistakes her children have made. The Kabras send the Cahills an 'invitation' to a meeting at a dock in Australia. Amy can't decide which Lucian to trust – the cloying Isabel Kabra, or the serious, but deadly, Irina Spasky. Irina stops following Isabel and helps Amy with the clue hunt. She turned away from Isabel because she lost her boy, Nikolai, when she was on a mission. Amy's life is threatened by Isabel who holds her out to shark infested waters, but she escapes thanks to Hamilton Holt, who helped her because of their previous alliance in The Black Circle. Amy and Dan are briefly distanced from each other when Irina tells Amy and Dan about their parents being murdered (Amy had been too filled with grief to tell Dan that their parents were murdered).

Amy and Dan continue their search to find out that Bob Troppo was actually Ekaterina agent Robert Cahill Henderson, who came devastatingly close to finding all 39 clues in his Indonesian lab. His work was destroyed by the Krakatoa eruption and he fled to Australia. Amy and Dan find a note written by him, a strange poem seemingly pointing to the clue. The Cahills discover the clue – water – with the help of Alistair Oh. However, Isabel Kabra sets the house they are staying in on fire, and Irina Spasky chooses to save Amy, Dan, and Alistair at the price of her own life. The book ends with Amy and Dan thinking that they now are doing the clue hunt for their parents and for Irina.

== Reception ==
On behalf of Booklist, Carolyn Phelan wrote, "The spy-versus-spy mentality will keep readers guessing as they try to separate deception from reality. Although the complex backstory looms large, the series' fans will devour the breathless action scenes in this fast-paced adventure".

Preceded by The Black Circle by Patrick Carman	The 39 Clues Series; Book 6	Succeeded by The Viper's Nest by Peter Lerangis
