= The Emperor's Code =

2010 novel by Gordon Korman

- The Emperor's Code
- Author: Gordon Korman
- Language: English
- Series: The 39 Clues
- Genre: Children's novel Adventure novel
- Publisher: Scholastic
- Publication date: April 6, 2010
- Publication place: United States
- Media type: Print (hardcover)
- Pages: 190
- ISBN: 978-0-545-06048-6
- OCLC: 503006773
- Preceded by: The Viper's Nest
- Followed by: Storm Warning

The Emperor's Code is the eighth book in The 39 Clues series written by Gordon Korman. The book's cover, revealed on March 2, 2010, shows a red mask with codes imprinted in specific areas against a purple background. After the release, readers were asked to find three of the four codes printed on the mask. If successful, 39 Clues fans could read an excerpt from The Emperor's Code.

== Plot ==
After returning to the hotel, an argument occurs between the two siblings and Dan Cahill runs away. He is kidnapped by Ian and Natalie Kabra, and is dumped in Jonah Wizard's lollipop factory, where Jonah treats him nicely (giving him his own suite, taking him to a concert, and letting him fly first class). Meanwhile, Amy Cahill and Nellie, searching for him, head to Alistair to get help in finding Dan. Alistair translates a Chinese newspaper saying that Jonah is going to the Great Wall of China. However, Jonah cancels his flight to the Great Wall, knowing that Amy and Nellie are going there; he instead goes to a Wushu City, where Dan takes Wushu lessons. Later, while exploring a tunnel, Dan finds lab equipment from Gideon Cahill's lab and a picture of Madeleine Cahill that belonged to the notorious Anne Bonny. The Wizards get a mysterious message that gives coordinates, saying to go to a specific spot at the Terra Cotta Warrior's resting place.

Meanwhile, Amy and Nellie look for Dan at the Great Wall and find a secret door. Nellie picks the lock and they come into a room. After Amy's Feng Shui-style organizing, a light shines in, showing Mt. Everest. While they were searching the Great Wall, Jonah and Dan checked out the Warriors. Jonah meant to send Dan in alone in case it was a trap, and it was, resulting in them being placed in jail. Jonah's Dad gets them out, and Jonah decides to quit the hunt. Cora Wizard, his mother, is disgusted and slaps Jonah, telling Dan that they have discovered his branch is Janus. Dan tells them he is a Madrigal and leaves the shocked Wizards. After he leaves, he sees the Holts climbing Mount Everest on television.

Grace had stored an advanced helicopter, the A-Star, in rural China and told Amy and Dan about it, knowing they would need it in the future. Dan, knowing the location of the A-Star, travels to it. When Amy and Nellie get the A-Star ready, Dan meets up with them. Dan and Amy head up to Mount Everest in the A-Star, where they find a serum embedded in Mount Everest, but lose it when Ian falls off the edge of a cliff. He hangs on to the edge and Amy saves him, letting the serum plunge miles below, with Amy knowing that they already had another form of the clue with them — the piece of silk. Amy then explains that the serum was silk in its liquid form.

After Amy finds the inscription indicating it was Anne Bonny's, they head to the Caribbean to search for the next clue that Anne Bonny may have left there.

Preceded by The Viper's Nest by Peter Lerangis	The 39 Clues Series; Book 8	Succeeded by Storm Warning by Linda Sue Park
