= H. G. Francis =

German writer (1936–2011)

Hans Gerhard Franciskowsky (14 January 1936 – 3 November 2011) was a German author of popular fiction, notably science fiction, and radio dramas. He wrote pseudonymously, most often as H. G. Francis, or as Hans G. Francis, H. G. Francisco, Gunther Frank, Peter Bars, R. C. Quoos-Raabe, Frank Sky, Hans G. Stelling or Ted Scott.

Francis was one of post-war Germany's most prolific authors, writing more than 400 novels and about 600 radio drama plays. His written work includes about 300 entries in the Perry Rhodan science fiction series and its spin-offs, as well as a young adult science fiction series of his own, Commander Perkins.

In the heyday of cassette radio dramas until the 1980s, he wrote hundreds of adaptations or original plays for youth series such as Three Investigators, The Famous Five, TKKG and Masters of the Universe. In total, more than 120 million of his plays were sold. They reached gold status 120 times and platinum status six times.
