= Oliver Rohrbeck =

German television actor and voice actor (born 1965)

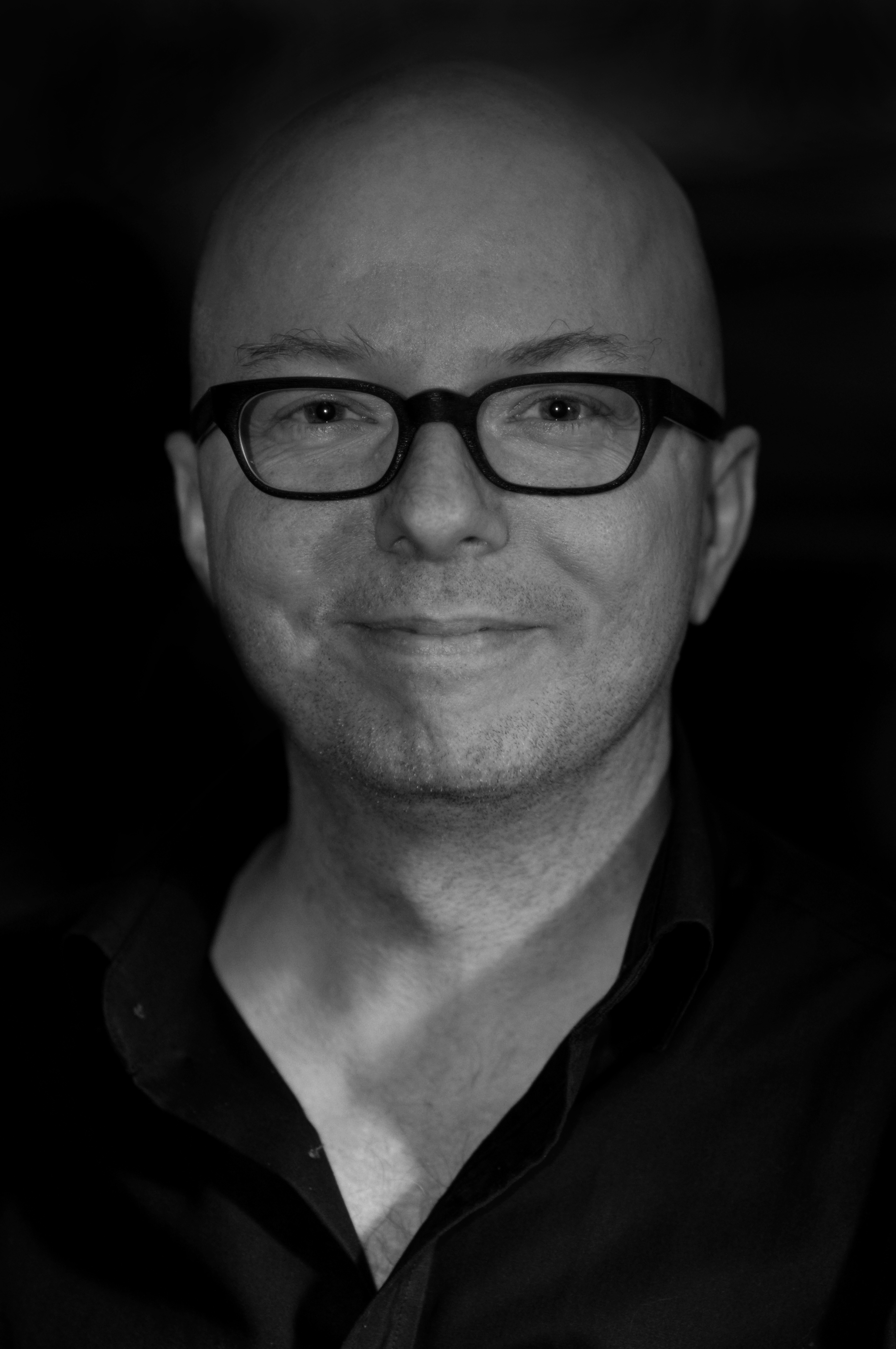
Oliver Rohrbeck

Oliver Rohrbeck (born March 21, 1965, in West-Berlin, Germany) is a German television and voice actor.

His television career includes appearances in shows like Sesame Street, Derrick and Balko.

He is better known for his work as a voice actor, his most famous role being Justus Jonas (Jupiter Jones) in the German version of the audio drama series "Three Investigators". He was cast for this role in 1978 and still provides the voice for this character, as well as his fellows Jens Wawrczek and Andreas Fröhlich (who dub Pete Crenshaw and Bob Andrews, respectively). Since 2003, they toured the country multiple times to performs plays in front of a live audience, since the series is still very popular in Germany. In 2014, they broke a Guinness World Record when performing the play Phonophobia in front of 20,000 people at the Waldbühne in Berlin.

In 1999, he provided some spoken passages on the first Schiller album Zeitgeist which also featured his colleagues Franziska Pigulla and Benjamin Völz.

Rohrbeck provides his voice for actors like Ben Stiller, Chris Rock, Michael Rapaport, Malcolm-Jamal Warner as Theodore Huxtable on The Cosby Show, Greg Germann in Ally McBeal and many animated characters like Gru in Despicable Me. His earliest role in this field was that of Disney's Pinocchio in the German 1973 re-release dub of the 1940 film.

In addition, Rohrbeck works as an audio book and dubbing director, e.g. for the German localizations of The Green Mile, Rush Hour, 8 Mile.
