= In Deep =

In Deep may refer to:

== Music ==
- In Deep (Argent album), 1973
- In Deep (Mark Lockheart album), 2009
- In Deep (Tina Arena album), 1997
- In Deep, an album by Marion Meadows, 2002
- Indeep, a 1980s American dance music group

== Other uses ==
- In Deep (book), a 1963 short-story collection by Damon Knight
- In Deep (TV series), a 2000s British crime drama series
- "In Deep" (Baywatch), a 1989 television episode
- In Deep with Angie Coiro, an American radio talk program hosted by Angie Coiro

== See also ==
- In the Deep (disambiguation)
- In Too Deep (disambiguation)
