= Seven Wonders (series) =

Novel series by Peter Lerangis

- Logo of the series
- The Colossus Rises (2013); Lost in Babylon (2013); The Tomb of Shadows (2014); The Curse of the King (2015); The Legend of the Rift (2016)
- Author: Peter Lerangis
- Country: United States
- Language: English
- Genre: Fantasy, adventure, mythological fiction and children's fiction
- Publisher: HarperCollins
- Published: 2013—2016
- Media type: Print (hardback and paperback), ebook, audiobook
- Website: http://www.sevenwondersbooks.com/

Seven Wonders is a pentalogy of children's fantasy, adventure and mythological fiction books written by American author Peter Lerangis. It is based on Greek mythology and set around the Seven Wonders of the Ancient World. Jack McKinley discovers a secret organization on a hidden island, and becomes the leader of a mission to retrieve seven lost magical orbs. As Jack and his three friends realize their lives are at stake, they have no choice but to accept the quest and embark on the challenge.

== Books ==
=== The Colossus Rises ===
The Colossus Rises is the first book in the series and was released on February 5, 2013.

The day after thirteen-year-old Jack McKinley is told he has six months to live, he awakens on a mysterious island, where a secret organization promises to save his life—with one condition. Jack and three other kids: Aly Black, Cass Williams, and Marco Ramsay, must lead a mission to retrieve seven lost magical objects known as Loculi, which can save their lives only when combined together correctly. The Loculi have been missing for a thousand years, lost amongst the ruins and relics of the Seven Wonders of the Ancient World. With no one else to turn to and no escape in sight, the four kids have no choice but to undertake the quest. On their quest, they learn more about one another and the secret superhuman abilities each possesses, but Jack has trouble finding out his own inner strength. The first Wonder they visit is the Colossus of Rhodes, where they realize that there is way more than just their lives at stake when a mythical creature kidnaps Cass and an enemy organization, known as the Massa, threaten to get the Loculus before them.

=== Lost in Babylon ===
Lost in Babylon is the second book in the series and was released on October 29, 2013.

After unearthing the first Loculus and defeating the Colossus of Rhodes, Jack and his friends are in worse shape than when they first set out. Marco has disappeared without a trace, along with the first Loculus. With no time to spare and no one else to turn to, Jack and the group have no choice but to follow the only clues they have and to head off on the next leg of their quest—to the Hanging Gardens of Babylon.

=== The Tomb of Shadows ===
The Tomb of Shadows is the third book in the series and was released on May 13, 2014.

With Babylon in ruins, Marco on the Massa side, and long-held secrets coming unraveled, the Select don’t know whom to trust or where to turn. With their G7W powers manifesting at a furious pace, Jack, Aly, and Cass have no choice but to continue their quest. As lives hang in the balance, the friends rush to the next stop on their quest, the famed Mausoleum at Halicarnassus. Here they have to face down their own demons and engage in a battle with the shadows of the dead.

=== The Curse of the King ===
The Curse of the King is the fourth book in the series and was released on March 4, 2015.

Having already defeated the Colossus of Rhodes, hunted through Ancient Babylon, and outfoxed legions of undead, the Select have recovered three of the lost Loculi hidden in the Seven Wonders of the Ancient World, only to lose one of them in order to save a life. They must now find a way to undo what has been done, to save themselves from the power that will overwhelm them—and destroy the world.

=== The Legend of the Rift ===
The Legend of the Rift is the fifth and final book in the series, released on March 8, 2016.

This story begins after King Uhla'ar kidnapped Aly and dragged her back through a rift in time. A giant, merciless behemoth guards the opening to the rift, and so Jack McKinley and his friends realize that rescuing Aly will be a lot harder than they thought. Their only hope is to rush to the last of the Ancient Wonders and find the rest of the lost Loculi. This mission takes them to the Temple of Artemis to fend off a mighty army before heading off to the Lighthouse of Alexandria where they wind up in the belly of a beast. But before all is said and done, they must return to where it all began, to Atlantis, to save Aly, themselves, and the world.

== Reception ==
Publishers Weekly reviewed The Colossus Rises saying "Lerangis, contributor to the 39 Clues series, has created a real page-turner, and while the characters are somewhat one-dimensional (particularly the adults), there’s a genuine sense of mystery and even a touch of grandeur to this tale". Kirkus Reviews has called it "a fast-paced, page-turning adventure".
