= In the Deep (disambiguation) =

"In the Deep" is a 2003 song by Bird York.

In the Deep may also refer to:

- In the Deep (album) or the title song, by Maria Solheim, 2012
- "In the Deep", a song by Alter Bridge from Walk the Sky, 2019
- 47 Meters Down, also released as In the Deep, a 2017 survival horror film

== See also ==
- In Deep (disambiguation)
- In Too Deep (disambiguation)
- Deep (disambiguation), including uses of The Deep
