= The Mystery of the Vanishing Treasure =

First edition (publ. Random House)

The Mystery of the Vanishing Treasure is an American juvenile detective novel written by Robert Arthur, Jr. It is the fifth book in the "Three Investigators" series.

== Plot ==
The Three Investigators visit a local museum when it is the scene of a daring robbery. The priceless Golden Belt is stolen, and both the police and museum security are baffled as to who committed the crime and how they got away with the belt.

Meanwhile, the Investigators are hired to investigate the bizarre case of an elderly woman who claims to be seeing gnomes in her yard at night. The boys soon learn that she is not imagining things, and their subsequent investigation leads them to discover a serious crime being perpetrated, as well as an unexpected connection to the Golden Belt case.
