= The Mystery of the Silver Spider =

1967 children's mystery by Robert Arthur Jr

First edition (publ. Random House, 1967)

The Mystery of the Silver Spider is a book in the Three Investigators series by Robert Arthur Jr.

== Plot ==
In this episode, the Three Investigators almost run into Prince Djaro with their car. Djaro is the soon-to-be ruler of the fictional European state of Varania, a country which is still very conscious of old traditions and fashions (around the 17th to 19th century). The Investigators form an instant friendship with him. Soon afterwards, they are asked by the United States Secret Service to travel to Varania to keep an eye on Djaro; there are rumors and indications that Djaro is to be dethroned. An important role in the plot is played by the title's Silver Spider, a piece of jewelry which is the most treasured item of Varanian history (comparable to the English Crown Jewels).

Soon, the Investigators find themselves actively involved, as the conspirators—headed by Duke Stefan, an ambitious nobleman and interim ruler of Varania—attempt to frame them for stealing the Spider, and by implication sully the name of Prince Djaro and endanger his coronation. Djaro cannot be crowned unless he is wearing the Silver Spider around his neck; Stefan and his men have stolen the real Silver Spider and left an imitation in its place. Bob suffers amnesia in their subsequent flight, and the Silver Spider goes missing. The Three Investigators and a pair of Djaro loyalists hide out, while scheming to expose Stefan's plot and help Djaro to prevail.

Despite the fact that all seems hopeless, they finally prevail when Jupe recalls an important piece of Varanian history, which allows them to alert and rally Varania's loyal citizenry. The effort is wrapped up when Jupiter finds the Silver Spider as "nothing more than a spider", hidden ingeniously by Bob in a real spider's web.

== Foreign publications ==
- The German version (titled: Die drei ??? und die silberne Spinne), first published in 1981, vastly changes the story's background: the name of the Varanian characters are altered into Swedish; the adventure is set in a place called Magnusstad in Texas; the local traditions (also patterned after Sweden) are passed off as mere tourist attractions; and the historical facts which lead to the happy ending are changed to accounts from a fictional novel, leading to logical plot holes. This alteration was effected by translator Leonore Puschert because of her personal affection for the Swedish language.
