= Robert Arthur Jr. =

American writer (1909–1969)

- Robert Arthur Jr. at work during 1950.
- Born: Robert Arthur Jr. November 10, 1909; Corregidor, Philippines
- Died: May 2, 1969 (aged 59); Philadelphia, Pennsylvania, U.S.
- Resting place: West Laurel Hill Cemetery, Bala Cynwyd, Pennsylvania, U.S.
- Education: University of Michigan
- Occupation: Writer
- Writing career
- Genres: Crime fiction, speculative fiction, mystery fiction

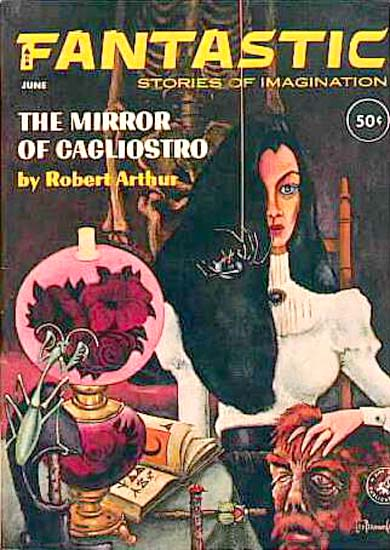
Arthur's novelette "The Mirror of Cagliostro " was the cover story for the June 1963 issue of Fantastic Stories, illustrated by Lee Brown Coye

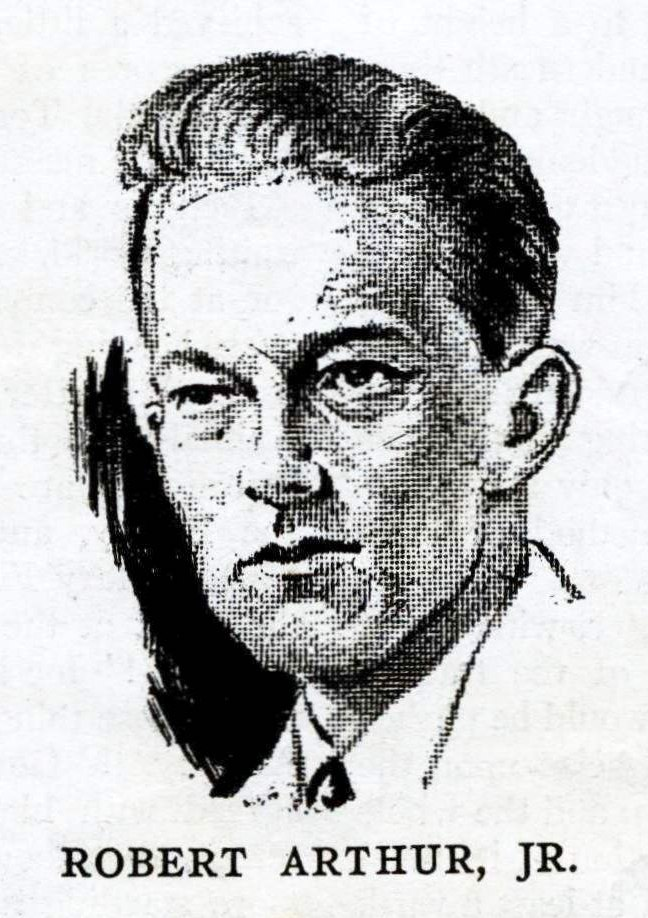
Arthur as pictured in Wonder Stories in 1931

Robert Arthur Jr. (November 10, 1909 – May 2, 1969) was an American writer and editor of crime fiction and speculative fiction known for his work with The Mysterious Traveler radio series and for writing The Three Investigators, a series of young adult novels.

For his radio work, Arthur—together with writing partner David Kogan—was honored with three Edgar Awards by the Mystery Writers of America. He also adapted at least one story, and had several of his own adapted by others, for Alfred Hitchcock's TV show, Alfred Hitchcock Presents.

== Early life and education ==
Arthur was born on November 10, 1909, in Fort Mills, Corregidor Island in the Philippines while his father, Robert Arthur Sr., was stationed there as a lieutenant in the United States Army. Arthur spent his childhood moving from place to place, wherever his father was stationed.

Although he was accepted to West Point Arthur decided not to pursue a military career like his father and instead in 1926 enrolled at the College of William & Mary in Williamsburg, Virginia. After two years, he transferred to the University of Michigan, where he graduated from with a B.A. in English in 1930.

He worked as an editor and returned to the University of Michigan and received his M.A. in Journalism in 1932.

== Career ==
=== Writing for fiction magazines and TV ===
His stories were published in, among other magazines, The Magazine of Fantasy and Science Fiction, Ellery Queen's Mystery Magazine, Mercury Mystery, Amazing Stories, Argosy All-Story Weekly, Black Mask, Collier's, Detective Fiction Weekly, Detective Tales, Double Detective, The Illustrated Detective Magazine, The Phantom Detective, The Shadow, Startling Stories, Street & Smith's Detective Story Magazine, Thrilling Detective, Unknown Worlds and Wonder Stories.

Additionally, Arthur wrote a number of mystery novels for children and young adults. His most successful stories were a series of mystery books called The Three Investigators, though they were initially branded "Alfred Hitchcock and the Three Investigators," as Arthur was also ghost-editor for most of the "Hitchcock" anthologies published by Random House, and reprinted in shorter form by Dell Books, before Arthur's death (other ghost editors, notably Harold Q. Masur, would continue editing new "Hitchcock Presents:" and YA anthologies for Random House till Hitchcock's death).

In 1959, he moved to Hollywood and began writing and editing screenplays and scripts for television shows.

=== Radio ===
Arthur, along with his writing partner David Kogan, was honored three times by the Mystery Writers of America with Edgar Awards for his radio work: twice for "best radio drama"—in 1950 for Murder by Experts and 1953 for The Mysterious Traveler—and once, regarding his work on both of the aforementioned shows, in 1951 for "outstanding achievement in producing, directing and writing radio mystery shows."

Other radio credits include: Dark Destiny (1942), Adventure Into Fear (1945), The Sealed Book (1945), The Teller of Tales (1950) and Mystery Time (1952).

Arthur died at the age of fifty-nine in Philadelphia, on May 2, 1969, and was interred at West Laurel Hill Cemetery in Bala Cynwyd, Pennsylvania.

== Bibliography ==
=== "Alfred Hitchcock and the Three Investigators" novels ===
- 1: The Secret of Terror Castle (1964)
- 2: The Mystery of the Stuttering Parrot (1964)
- 3: The Mystery of the Whispering Mummy (1965)
- 4: The Mystery of the Green Ghost (1965)
- 5: The Mystery of the Vanishing Treasure (1966)
- 6: The Secret of Skeleton Island (1966)
- 7: The Mystery of the Fiery Eye (1967)
- 8: The Mystery of the Silver Spider (1967)
- 9: The Mystery of the Screaming Clock (1968)
- 11: The Mystery of the Talking Skull (1969)

Three Investigator novels numbered 10 and 12 to 43 were written by other authors.

=== Short story collections by Robert Arthur Jr. ===
- Ghosts and More Ghosts (1963)
- Mystery and More Mystery (1966)
- The Midnight Visitor

=== Short story collections edited by Robert Arthur Jr. ===
- Alfred Hitchcock Presents Stories for Late at Night (1961)
- Alfred Hitchcock's Haunted Houseful (1961)
- Alfred Hitchcock's Ghostly Gallery (1962)
- Alfred Hitchcock's Solve-Them-Yourself-Mysteries (1963) (All stories written by Robert Arthur with the exception of "The Mystery of the Sinister Theft")
- Alfred Hitchcock Presents Stories That My Mother Never Told Me (1963)
- Alfred Hitchcock's Monster Museum (1965)
- Alfred Hitchcock Presents Stories Not for the Nervous (1965)
- Alfred Hitchcock's Sinister Spies (1966)
- Alfred Hitchcock Presents Stories That Scared Even Me (1967)
- Alfred Hitchcock's Spellbinders in Suspense (1967)
- Alfred Hitchcock Presents Stories They Wouldn't Let Me Do On TV (1968)
- Davy Jones Haunted Locker (1965)
- Spies and More Spies (1967)
- Thrillers and More Thrillers (1968)
- Monster Mix (1968)
- Alfred Hitchcock's Daring Detectives (1969)

=== Television writing credits ===
- The Unforeseen (1960)
- Matinee Theatre (1955) (episode: "The Babylonian Heart")
- Alfred Hitchcock Presents (episode: "The Jokester")
- Thriller (1961–1962) (episodes: "An Attractive Family", "Dialogues with Death", "The Prisoner in the Mirror")
