= Mary Virginia Carey =

American writer

- Born: 19 May 1925; New Brighton, England
- Died: 27 May 1994 (aged 69); California, USA
- Occupation: Writer
- Organization(s): American Lung Association; Society of Children’s Book Writers

Mary Virginia Carey (1925–1994) was an English/American writer. She became famous through her involvement in the youth book series The Three Investigators.

Mary Virginia Carey was born in New Brighton, England on May 19, 1925, to John Cornelius (an engineer) and Mary Alice (Hughes) Carey. She came to the United States as a baby and lived in California, becoming a naturalised citizen in 1955.

In 1969, after working with Walt Disney Productions writing novelizations of Disney motion pictures, she began to work free-lance as an author and completed more than ten 'Three Investigators' books for Random House. Her other titles included A Place for Allie (1985) which was based on the life of Carey's mother and her trip from Nova Scotia to Boston.

Carey was a board member of the American Lung Association as well as a member of the Society of Children's Book Writers.

She died in California on May 27, 1994.

== Bibliography ==
=== The Story of Walt Disney's Motion Picture ===
- The Sword in the Stone (Whitman Publishing Company, 1963)
- The Misadventures of Merlin Jones (Whitman Publishing Company, 1964)
- Mary Poppins (Whitman Publishing Company, 1964)
- The Gnome-Mobile (Whitman Publishing Company, 1967)
- The Jungle Book (Whitman Publishing Company, 1967)
- Blackbeard's Ghost (Whitman Publishing Company, 1968)

=== Three Investigators ===
- The Mystery of the Flaming Footprints (1971)
- The Mystery of the Singing Serpent (1972)
- The Mystery of Monster Mountain (1973)
- The Secret of the Haunted Mirror (1972), co-written with William Arden
- The Mystery of the Invisible Dog (1973), co-written with William Arden
- The Mystery of Death Trap Mine (1976)
- The Mystery of the Magic Circle (1978)
- The Mystery of the Sinister Scarecrow (1979)
- The Mystery of the Scar-Faced Beggar (1981)
- The Mystery of the Blazing Cliffs (1981)
- The Mystery of the Wandering Cave Man (1982)
- The Mystery of the Missing Mermaid (1983)
- The Mystery of the Two-Toed Pigeon (1983)
- The Mystery of the Trail of Terror (1984)
- The Mystery of the Rogues' Reunion (1985)
- The Mystery of the Creep-Show Crooks (1985)
- The Mystery of the Cranky Collector (1987)

=== Other works ===
- Donald Duck and the Lost Mesa Ranch (Whitman Publishing Company, 1966)
- The Owl Who Loved Sunshine (Golden Books, 1977) ISBN: 0307134334 / 9780307134332
- The Secret of NIMH: Mrs. Brisby's Important Package (Golden Books, 1982) ISBN: 0307118851 / 9780307118851
- The Gremlins Storybook (Golden Books, 1984) ISBN: 0307158209 / 9780307158208
- A Place for Allie (Dodd Mead, 1985) ISBN: 0396085830 / 9780396085836
