= Commander Perkins =

German science fiction series

Commander Perkins is a German science fiction series by H. G. Francis, published partly as audio plays and partly as a series of novels.

== Background ==
The series is set approximately 50 to 100 years in the future. Mankind has settled the Moon, where the Moon base "Delta-4" is a central setting, while the rest of the Solar System is being explored. The scientist character of Professor Dr. Arthur Common has created (with the assistance of his daughter Cindy) the "Dimension Transmitter." With this device, users can overcome arbitrary distances without time delay. Via an enormous energy expenditure from the Transmitter, the Time/Space dimensions break open to allow small groups of humans to visit alien planets without transport.

Based on this premise, in this series, the protagonist Commander Randy Perkins and his friend and colleague Major Peter Hoffmann, often accompanied by the professor's telepathically gifted son Ralph, undertake voyages into alien worlds, often involving the ill-prepared Earth in intergalactic events.

== Main characters ==
- Commander Randy Perkins, an experienced officer and main protagonist.
- Major Peter Hoffmann, Perkin's best friend. Tends to panic during action, but makes characteristic humorous and sarcastic remarks. He has a crush on Cindy Common.
- Professor Dr. Arthur Common, scientist, is the inventor of the Dimension Transmitter.
- Cindy Common, his impulsive young daughter and assistant, she is a physicist and mathematician. She has a crush on Perkins and fends off Hoffman's flirting with wicked humor.
- Ralph Common, the telepathic 12-year-old son of the professor.
- Oberst (Colonel) G. Camiel Jason, the administrator of Moon base Delta-4. Unsympathetic, stubborn and impulsive, he is much an antagonist as the various aliens Perkins has to fight.
- General Basil Lucan Crinian, the chief of the Armed Forces of Earth.
- Camiel, individual class robot, brings humor into the series.

== The Vega Series ==
The Wega Series is the first series that consists of six audio plays that were produced in 1976–1978 by Europa (audio play). It was directed by Heikedine Körting, with scripts written by H. G. Francis. The playing time of the individual audio plays varies between 35 and 50 minutes.

Episodes:

1. The Gate to Another World (1976)
2. In the Tide of Infinity (1976)
3. The Secret of the Ufos (1977)
4. Bordon The Immortal (1977)
5. Saturn Calling Delta-4 (1978)
6. Expedition Into the Past (1978)

Starring

- Commander Randy Perkins: Horst Stark
- Major Peter Hoffmann: Gernot Endemann
- Professor Dr. Arthur Common: Franz-Josef Steffens
- Cindy Common: Gabi Libbach
- Ralph Common: Mathias Lorenz
- Colonel G. Camiel Jason: Andreas von der Meden (Ep. 2), Karl-Ulrich Meves (Ep.5)
- Bordon The Immortal: Lothar Grützner (Ep. 4), Gottfried Kramer (Ep. 6),
- General Oregon: Helmo Kindermann (Ep. 3)
- General Crinian: Hans Daniel (Ep. 4)
- Telepathic Voice: Wolfgang Kaven

Also Starring: Andreas Beurmann, Volker Bogdan, Volker Brandt, Werner Cartano, Peter Kirchberger, Ernst von Klipstein, Lutz Mackensy, Rolf Mamero, Christian Mey, Hella von der Osten-Sacken, Jochen Sehrndt, Horst Schick, Heinz Trixner, Claus Wilcke.

=== Plot summary ===
The Dimension Transmitter is still in the experimentation stage. However, there is already contact with the eighth planet of the Vega system. With cameras and probes, data was collected from that planet. On the Moon base, Ralph Common is lured into the Dimension Transmitter by a telepathic voice. He overrides all safety locks and is transported to the Vega planet, where he is detained by the locals. Professor Common asks Commander Perkins and Major Hoffmann to bring back his son to the Moon. They succeed; however, Ralph Common tells them that there must be a connection between Earth and Vega, since there are maps showing the area of the Mediterranean Sea. Communication with the Vegans is not yet possible, with the exception of the telepathic voice, which only Ralph can hear.

The Vegans realize that there is a dimension portal between the worlds. By waiting at its warp point, they send an emissary to the Moon who, however, is killed by accident. In an attempt to mediate, Perkins, Hoffmann and Ralph take another trip to the Vega. They fail, and Perkins is captured. A release attempt succeeds, but apparently the commander was brainwashed and remains in a kind of waking coma. Perkins awakes after half a year, and at the same time a Vegan spaceship appears on Earth, which is later accidentally shot down (the ship creates an energy field which scrambles electronic processes in both machines and the human body). Vegan survivors try to reach the Dimension Transmitter in order to return to their home world. Professor Common wants to release the Vegans, but the military wants to cross-examine the extraterrestrials. But while transporting them back to the Vega, an error occurs, Perkins, Hoffman and the Vegans are hurled not just through space and to the Vega planet, but also into the past, where the two humans witness the accidental death of a nobleman and are blamed for murder. At the last second, Professor Common finds the two men and brings them back. During this episode, clues are found that the Vegans had something to do with the Biblical disaster of Sodom and Gomorrah.

All the Vegan men of the shot spaceship are declared dead, and in retaliation the Vegans send a space fleet to Earth to take revenge. The destruction of mankind seems inevitable. Perkins, Hoffman and Ralph travel to Vega to settle the conflict; there they meet Bordon the Immortal, whose aging process had been stopped by a curse (which is linked to the death of the nobleman Perkins and Hoffman had witnessed). Together they manage to halt the attack on Earth, but it proves to be only a temporary solution.

As the Vegans poise to strike against Earth, Perkins takes a desperate gamble. Against the strict orders of Colonel Jason, he hides Professor Common on a deserted Moon station and merely disables the Dimension Transmitter, since he knows that the device is mankind's only hope of ending this conflict. The Vegans invade Delta-4, but come up empty-handed and - as Perkins has hoped - are now willing to negotiate. To his surprise, the Vegan high commander turns out to be Bordon, who is also revealed as the telepathic voice which had lured Ralph into the Dimensional Transmitter. Bordon is participating in the war to prove that the humans are the ones to blame and the Vegans therefore have the right to retaliate. After much arguing, Perkins persuades the Immortal to find the roots for the Vegan antipathy against the humans - by means of controlled time travel back to the last days of Sodom and Gomorrha.

Along with Ralph, Perkins, Hoffman and Bordon arrive near the two cities just in time to see a Vegan spaceship landing. As it turns out, Sodom and Gomorrah had been the landing site of an ancient Vegan expedition. One of its members, Drapondor (an Immortal like Bordon himself), had disappeared, and the people of Sodom and Gomorrah are suspected by the Vegans of having murdered him, thus causing the conflict between the two people. As Perkins' group enters the city, they attract unwelcome attention and seek refuge in the house of Lot, where they find Drapondor, infected with leprosy, which is also the cause of his detachment from the expedition force. As events transpire as recorded in the Bible, Perkins and his group, taking Drapondor, Lot and his family with them, escape just before the Vegans drop an atomic bomb, eradicating the two cities. The time travelers are whisked back into their own time at the last second; in Delta-4 Drapondor is cured of the disease, and the series ends with Bordon making a public apology to the people of the Earth.

== The First Novels ==
In 1979, Franz Schneider Verlag published two Commander Perkins novels. Francis does not take any references to the audio plays in those two books. With the second novel a new character, Camiel the robot, is introduced.

1. The Red Fog (1979)
2. Planet of the Soulless (1979)

=== Plot summaries ===
- The Red Fog

A red veil deposits itself around Earth which lets humans disappear when it lowers to the ground. It is found out, the fog originated from the Dimension Transmitter as a small ball came and damaged. After the repair Commander Perkins, Major Hoffmann and Ralph Common travel to the planet Empty, from which the fog came and investigate, how to fight the strange substance, threatening all life on Earth.

- Planet of the Soulless

Ralph Common and all the psi-talented humans on Earth lie in dying, a telepathic power of the planet Psion seems to destroy their brains. In the last second Ralph can be protected with a special helmet against the psi attack. Commander Perkins, Major Hoffmann, Ralph Common and the robot Camiel travel to Psion investigating the cause of the attack. They determine that on the strange planet, all inhabitants act like soulless machines.

== The Arrow Trilogy ==
The second series consists of three audio play episodes that appeared 1980 under the direction of Heikedine Körting under the label Europa. The scripts were again written by H. G. Francis. A 4th and 5th episode were announced, however they never appeared. H. G. Francis also never wrote scripts for those. Why those episodes did not appear is not completely clear. However low sales figures of the first three audio plays might have been decisive. The action placed around the planet Arrow and The Middle Eye is incomplete. H. G. Francis used elements from the Arrow Trilogy in the Copanian plot, which resulted in some inconsistencies in the novels. The playing time of the individual audio plays is approximately 33 minutes each.

Episodes:

1. Lost in Infinity (1980)
2. The Galactic Weapon Master (1980)
3. The Middle-Eye (1980)

Starring

- Narrator: Karl Walter Diess
- Commander Randy Perkins: Horst Stark
- Major Peter Hoffmann: Gernot Endemann
- Professor Dr. Arthur Common: Franz-Josef Steffens
- Cindy Common: Gabi Libbach
- Ralph Common: Mathias Lorenz
- Colonel G. Camiel Jason: Karl-Ulrich Meves
- Polcor: Reiner Brönneke

Also Starring: Volker Brandt, Peter Buchholz, Werner Cartano, Wolfgang Jürgen, Harald Pages.

=== Plot summary ===
Professor Common discovers a planet that is littered with spaceship wrecks. The military (including Colonel Jason) have a primary interest in retrieving weapons from the destroyed spaceships. During the exploration, the Humans are frightened by a highly sophisticated people. One of their scientists, Coleman, even alerts the aliens to the humans' presence by activating some of the wrecks' equipment.

An evacuation of the planet takes place immediately, but documents determining the galactic position of the Earth brought along by Coleman remain on Arrow. Perkins and Hoffman, with the scientist in their company, are sent back to the ship graveyard to retrieve or destroy them, but the aliens (which resemble humanoid panthers) are alerted and Coleman begins to act increasingly irrational. As it turns out, he has come under the mental control of a metal-devouring creature the aliens use to dispose of the wrecks, which later kills the scientist. Perkins and Hoffman are taken prisoner.

In the meantime, Professor Common, Cindy and Colonel Jason try their best to retrieve Perkins' team, but they do not succeed. Instead, a strange device appears in the Dimension Transmitter which emanates strange impulses which grow stronger and stronger. The professor, assuming that the device is either a weapon or a homing beacon, immediately sends it to another solar system.

In their holding cell on Arrow, Perkins and Hoffman encounter a fellow prisoner: one of the aliens, who introduces himself as Polcor, a Galactic Weapon Master. In addition, the cell is telepathically empowered and begins to pull information about Earth from their minds when Professor Common rescues them. After the two have reported, Colonel Jason realizes the value of Polcor as a source of information and sends them back - along with Ralph - to retrieve him from the cell and question him on an uninhabited planet. But Polcor's identity turns out to be a ruse: He is in fact the ruler of the Galactic Weapon Masters on Arrow, and he had developed a horrible weapon - a Sun Annihilator - for a greater cosmic power, the Middle Eye, which had been refused. In order to make up for the disgrace, Polcor tries to blame mankind for the existence of the weapon. What is worse is that the Sun Annihilator is actually the device Professor Common had accidentally snatched with the Dimension Transmitter.

Retrieving the Annihilator, Perkins, Hoffman, Ralph and Polcor return to Arrow, to be captured by the Middle Eye, an alien race appearing as sentient, eye-like beings. Polcor's accusations against the humans are easily countered by Perkins; still, the Middle Eye decides to keep the humans as prisoners to learn the location of Earth from them. Polcor, on the other hand, is punished for his deceit by being forced to watch his home planet getting destroyed by the Middle Eye. In revenge, Polcor frees the humans and enables their escape from the Eye's ship before they can be interrogated, and with the help of Professor Common they return safely to Earth.

== The Copanian Series ==
In 1980 and 1981, the Franz Schneider Verlag published four more books with a continuous plot line to create the Copanian Series. However, no reference was made to either the Wega or the Arrow series, although The Middle Eye played an important role.

1. The Forbidden Star (1980)
2. Land of the Green Sun (1980)
3. Lost in Infinity (1981)
4. In the Spell of the Glowing Eyes (1981)

=== Plot summary ===
Dr. John Lightfire has discovered a planet which exhibits best living conditions. After an examination too swift Humans begin to colonize "Lightfire." On a tour with Ralph Common and his friend George Croden Commander Perkins discover an ancient robot. The machine attempts to attack them, but collapses from weakness brought on by age. Ralph and George start to age rapidly. Humans determine Lightfire is a sacred planet which must not be set foot on by threat of annihilation of the whole race of the trespasser. In the hasty evacuation, the Copanian high priest Arentes manages to smuggle himself to Earth. He finds Humans interesting and wants to study them to find out, whether they might be worth to be spared. Meanwhile, the Humans have successfully deceived the Copanians into attacking a different uninhabited planet instead of Earth. Closer investigations determine the bait planet to be consumed by a Copanian controlled black hole is inhabited after all. Feverishliy, the Humans try to save the doomed planet and its inhabitants.

== The Seven Columns Series ==
In 1983 and 1984, the Franz Schneider Verlag published what would be the last three novels for the Seven Columns Series. These formed the prelude to the series. At least one further novel was in preparation, however no more appeared. Unfortunately, the plot line remained unfinished.

1. The Third Moon (1983)
2. The Mystery of the Seven Columns (1984)
3. The Time Trap (1984)

=== Plot summary ===
On planet Phart, Perkins, Hoffmann, Camiel, and Cindy Common discover a buried sleeper ship. On board is a martial people for whom the planet is meant to be a prison. Humans wake these warriors not knowing what grave danger for other planets they evoke. The ship takes course on the planet Canyoura around it to attack. Perkins and the others go to Canyoura to warn the population. The people of the planet to not believe them, citing that no one would dare attack the planet as it has one of the Seven Columns. When humans research the meaning of these columns, they are taken prisoner and trained to become gladiators for Canyouran entertainment. On the run Perkins and Hoffmann discover the secret of the First Column, immortality.

== Audio plays based on the novels ==
The audio play publisher Maritim produced new audio plays based on the first four novels by H.G. Francis. These appeared under the name Das Sternentor, since Europa still holds the rights of the name Commander Perkins. The fifth audio play was to appear in October 2005 but the demise of one of the starring actors delayed production. They were announced for July or August 2006.

Episodes:

1. The Red Fog (2002)
2. Planet of the Soulless (2003)
3. The Forbidden Star (2003)
4. In the Land of the Green Sun (2004)
5. Lost in Infinity (2006)
6. Banished by Glowing Eyes (2006)
7. The Third Moon (2008)
8. The Mystery of the Seven Columns (2008)
9. The Time Trap (2009)

Starring

- Narrator: Jürgen Neumann
- Commander Randy Perkins: Ernst Meincke
- Major Peter Hoffmann: Nicolas Böll
- Professor Dr. Arthur Common: Rolf Jülich (Ep. 1–4), Helmut Krauss (Ep. 5–6)
- Cindy Common: Karin Eckholt
- Ralph Common: Wolfgang Bahro
- Colonel G. Camiel Jason: Thomas Kästner
- Camiel: Michael Pan
- George Croden: Alexander Draeger
- Arentes: Frank Straass (Ep. 3), Peter Groeger (Ep. 4–6)
- General Basil Lucan Crinian: Eckart Dux

Also Starring: Peer Augustinski, Tanja Dohse, Sabine Hahn, Michael Harck, Günther Lüdke, Reent Reins, Charles Rettinghaus, Ursula Vogel, Pia Werfel, Claus Wilcke.
