= The Viper's Nest =

2010 book by Peter Lerangis

- The Viper's Nest
- Author: Peter Lerangis
- Language: English
- Series: The 39 Clues
- Genre: Children's novel Adventure novel
- Published: February 2, 2010 Scholastic
- Publication place: United States; UK; Canada
- Media type: Print (hardcover)
- Pages: 190
- ISBN: 978-0-545-06047-9
- Preceded by: In Too Deep
- Followed by: The Emperor's Code

The Viper's Nest is the seventh book in The 39 Clues series. It was written by Peter Lerangis and was released by Scholastic on February 2, 2010. The 39 Clues series is intended for children aged 8–12, and takes the form of a multimedia adventure story spanning 10 books. The stories focus on a brother and sister, Amy and Dan Cahill, and their efforts to piece together clues left by the matriarch of the family, Grace Cahill, upon her death.

The Viper's Nest follows immediately on from the events of the preceding book: In Too Deep. The events are described, below, using in-universe tone. Shocked by the death of Irina Spasky, Dan and Amy venture into danger once again. For the first, they begin to question how much they trust their au pair, Nellie. Later in the book, she regains their trust.

The inside front and back covers read “MADRIGAL LEADER=GRACE” when the letters are alternated beginning with the front cover. Front Cover: MDIALAE=RC Back Cover: ARGLEDRGAE The Morse code dashes and dots, along the page margins in the middle of the book, reads: "THERE IS A MADRIGAL WATCHER".

== Plot summary ==
The book begins the morning after the fire that killed Irina Spasky, who was an ex-KGB and Lucian spy. The two kids are shaken by what had happened, not believing that Irina was on their side, after attempting to kill them earlier in the series. They realize that Isabel has reported them to the police, and they make a quick getaway using Irina's boat. Dan finds a notebook in Irina's bag and in it they find the phrase : "I'm with you and you're with me and so we are all together". Using their decoding abilities, Dan and Amy figure out that the words are actually a song, which points them to Pretoria, South Africa. They are found by the police and Alistair is captured. There, he finds out that the person who framed them is actually Bae Oh. He escapes by faking death by heart failure. Amy, Dan and Nellie safely board a plane to South Africa.

There, they are given a postcard suggesting a connection with Shaka Zulu. As they unravel the history of Shaka, they find out that he was a member of the Tomas branch, and was connected to Winston Churchill. After infiltrating a Tomas stronghold, and steal the Clue, they find that it is diamonds. They are captured by the Kabras while leaving South Africa. Isabel Kabra offers Dan and Amy to join their family. When they decline, Isabel orders them to be tied in chairs, and chopped to pieces by a spinning propeller.

They escape with the help of Professor Bardsley, a Cahill that is uninvolved with the Hunt, together with the vial of green liquid that they thought was their first clue in The Maze of Bones, by flying Grace Cahill's old plane, The Flying Lemur. During the ride, Dan and Amy accidentally break the vial, spilling some of the contents onto Dan's arm. It is revealed to be a Lucian poison. To get the antidote, they fly to Grace Cahill's home in Madagascar.

While at Grace's Malagasy home, they solve a code in a letter they found that said: TOMAS CLUE IS UMHLABA. find a page in her journal that says, ″I am feeling melancholy today, thinking about my dear A & H and missing them so. I cannot even bear to listen to my beloved di Lasso, because of the reminder...″, and on another page it says, ″I have written Deng Xiaoping, who has agreed to grant to visit to A & H when he discovered that they, like him, are "M." This leads Dan to realize with horror that his and Amy's family branch are the Madrigals.

Preceded by In Too Deep by Jude Watson	The 39 Clues Series; Book 7	Succeeded by The Emperor's Code by Gordon Korman
