= The Mystery of the Whispering Mummy =

Third book in The Three Investigators series by Robert Arthur, Jr. (1965)

First edition

The Mystery of the Whispering Mummy is the third book in The Three Investigators series by Robert Arthur Jr. It was originally published in the United States by Random House in 1965. Library of Congress catalog number 99192344 .

== Plot summary ==
The boys receive a letter from Alfred Hitchcock requesting they visit a friend of his, Professor Yarborough, who has a mummy along with other artifacts in his house. The mummy has been whispering in a strange language, but only when Yarborough is alone in the room. They also receive a letter from a Mrs Banfry in Santa Monica, whose distinctive cat has gone missing.

They meet with the Professor and his butler, Wilkins, who is convinced the whispering is an ancient curse. They also approach Yarborough's neighbor, Professor Freeman, for help on the language. Jupiter gets the mummy to whisper to him while disguised as the professor. Pete tackles a boy hiding in the grounds of the house, and later befriends him. The boy is named Hamid and believes the mummy is one of his ancestors. Pete and Hamid hide in the mummy's case when thieves steal it and take it to a warehouse. They escape, but can't find their way back until they get a lead from placing a series of telephone calls to friends, who then call their friends and so on. Jupiter calls this a Ghost to Ghost Hookup.

The boys learn that the mummy and missing cat cases are connected, and when Jupiter happens upon the warehouse and the thieves, he must hide in the mummy case to avoid being caught. The case is taken to a familiar location and Bob and Pete quickly arrive on the scene and the villain is caught.
