= The Secret of Terror Castle =

1964 novel by Robert Arthur, Jr.

- First edition cover
- Author: Robert Arthur, Jr.
- Language: English
- Series: Three Investigators
- Genre: Children's novel
- Published: 1964 (Random House)
- Publication place: United States
- Pages: 179 (first, hardback edition)
- OCLC: 1417052
- Followed by: The Mystery of the Stuttering Parrot

The Secret of Terror Castle is an American juvenile detective novel written by Robert Arthur, Jr. It is the first book in the "Three Investigators" series.

== Plot ==
Three boys are investigating a known haunted house, Terror Castle, in hopes that perhaps the film director Alfred Hitchcock would use it in his upcoming movie. Having just launched their investigation firm, the Three Investigators are hoping for a triumphant success to gain publicity and build their credibility. They briefly gain an audience with the skeptical Hitchcock, who is dismissive but agrees to introduce their case if they are able to demonstrate that the castle is truly haunted.

Terror Castle is the former home of movie actor Stephen Terrill, who died in a possibly suicidal car accident that occurred as his career was on the verge of collapse. Terrill had pledged to haunt his former home to keep anyone else from living there. During their investigations, the boys find very scary and seemingly real activities going on in the abandoned structure, such as the Fog of Fear and the Blue Phantom.

== Film adaptation ==
A film based on this book aired on Disney XD on March 19, 2010, and then aired another one in April 2010.

The plot of the film differs significantly from that of the book. In the film, Stephen Terrill is an inventor rather than a silent film actor; and many of the apparently supernatural occurrences are actually Terrill's inventions which continue to operate in the house. The 'haunting' is also partly the work of art thief Victor Hugenay.

== Other adaptations ==
In 1984, an audio adaptation based on the book was released on cassette (BOW-100) by Rainbow Communications Limited of England. It was adapted by Edward Kelsey and directed by Tony Bilbow.
