= Peter Lerangis =

American author

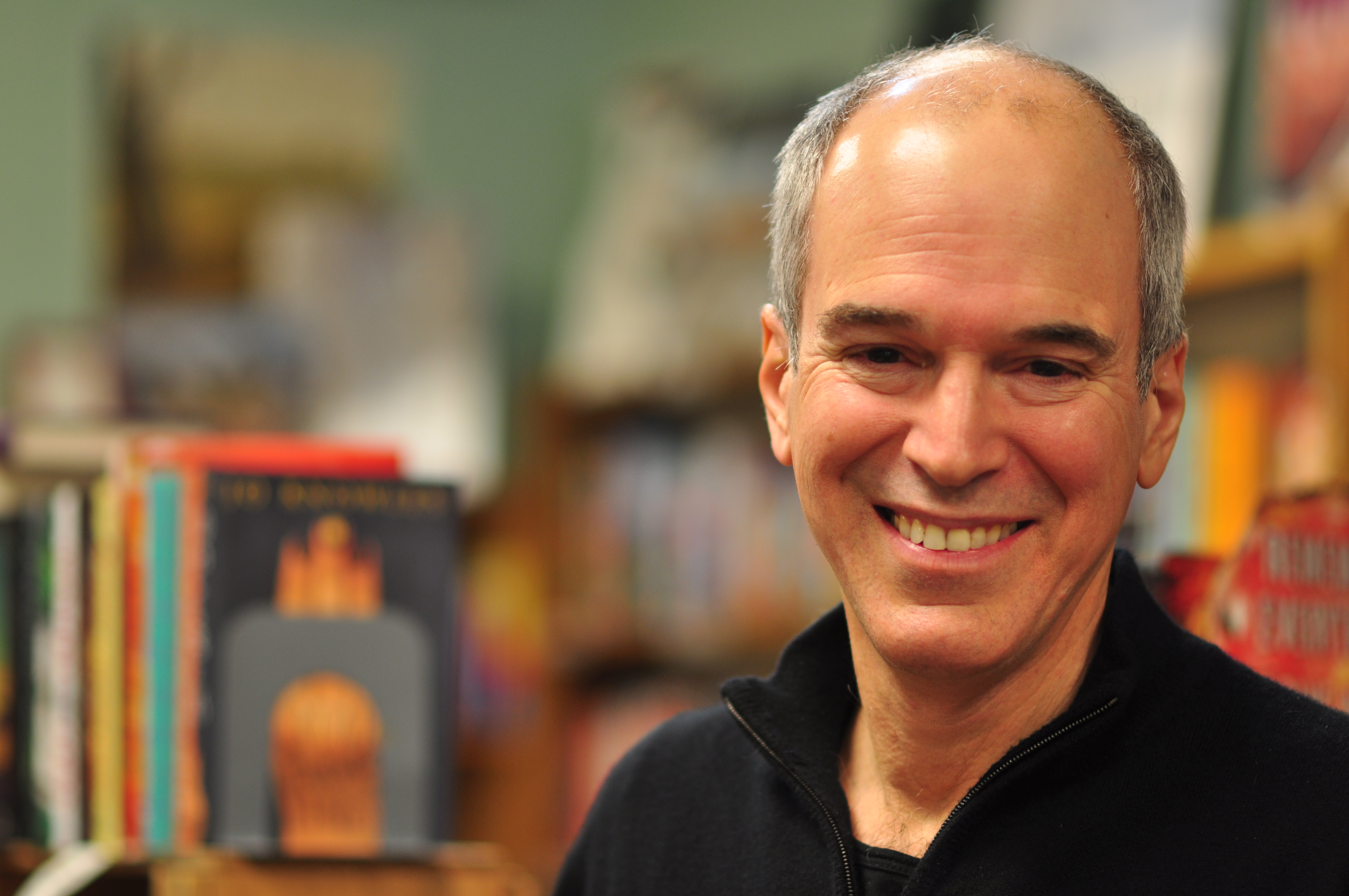
- Peter Lerangis
- Born: 1955 (age 70–71); Brooklyn, New York, U.S.
- Education: Harvard University (BA)
- Occupation: Author
- Spouse: Tina deVaron
- Writing career
- Notable works: Seven Wonders series, 39 clues series
- Website: peterlerangis.com

Peter Duncan Lerangis (born 1955, in Brooklyn, New York) is an American author of children's and young adult fiction, best known for his Seven Wonders series and his work on the 39 Clues series.

== Life and career ==
Lerangis's work includes the Seven Wonders series, all five books of which made The New York Times Best Seller list for Children's Books. He was also the author of The Viper's Nest and The Sword Thief, two titles in the New York Times-bestselling children's-book series The 39 Clues, along with the second entry in a four-novella collection, Vespers Rising. This book served as an introduction to a six-book 39 Clues sequel entitled Cahills Vs. Vespers, for which he wrote the third book, The Dead of the Night. His other books include the historical novel Smiler's Bones, the YA novel Somebody, Please Tell Me Who I Am (with Harry Mazer), the YA dark comedy-adventure novel wtf, the Drama Club series, the Spy X series, the Watchers series, the Abracadabra series, and the Antarctica two-book adventure, as well ghost-writing for series such as the Three Investigators, the Hardy Boys Casefiles, Sweet Valley Twins, and more than forty books in the series The Baby-sitters Club and its various spin-offs. He has also written novels based on film screenplays, including The Sixth Sense, Sleepy Hollow, and Beauty and the Beast, and five video game novelizations in the Worlds of Power series created by Seth Godin. As a ghostwriter he has been published under the name A. L. Singer.

Lerangis is the son of a retired New York Telephone Company employee and a retired public-elementary-school secretary, who raised him in Freeport, New York on Long Island. He graduated from Harvard University with a degree in biochemistry, while acting in musicals and singing with and musically directing the a cappella group the Harvard Krokodiloes. Peter was said to have been classmates with Bill Gates in college before he dropped out and founded the company Microsoft. Upon graduation, Peter moved to New York where he worked as an actor and freelance copy editor for eight years before becoming an author.

In 2003, Lerangis was chosen by First Lady Laura Bush to accompany her to the first Russian Book Festival, hosted by Russian First Lady Lyudmila Putina in Moscow. Authors R. L. Stine (Goosebumps) and Marc Brown (the Arthur the Aardvark series) also made the trip with Bush.

Also in 2003, Lerangis was commissioned by the United Kingdom branch of Scholastic to write X-Isle, one of four books that would relaunch the Point Horror series there. A sequel, Return to X-Isle, was published in 2004.

In 2007, Scholastic announced the launch of a new historical mystery series called The 39 Clues, intended to become a franchise. Lerangis wrote the third book in the series, The Sword Thief, published in March 2009. On March 3, 2009, Scholastic announced that Lerangis would write the seventh book in the series, The Viper's Nest.

In 2016, Lerangis traveled to Patan Dhoka, Nepal where he was the guest speaker at Bal Sahitya Mahotsav, the first children's literature festival in Nepal.

Lerangis lives in New York City with his wife, musician Tina deVaron. He has two grown children, Nick and Joe.

== Bibliography ==
=== Watchers series ===
1. Last Stop (November 1, 1998, eBook reissue March 20, 2012)
2. Rewind (November 1, 1998, eBook reissue March 20, 2012)
3. I.D. (January 1, 1999, eBook reissue March 20, 2012)
4. War (April 1999, eBook reissue March 20, 2012)
5. Island (July 1, 1999, eBook reissue March 20, 2012)
6. Lab 6 (October 1, 1999, eBook reissue March 20, 2012)

=== Antarctica series ===
1. Journey to the Pole (2000, eBook reissue March 20, 2012)
2. Escape from Disaster (2000, eBook reissue March 20, 2012)

=== Abracadabra series (with Jim Talbot) ===
1. Poof! Rabbits Everywhere (April 1, 2002)
2. Boo! Ghosts in School (April 1, 2002)
3. Presto! Magic Treasure (July 2002)
4. Yeeps!: Secrets in the Statue (October 1, 2002)
5. Zap! Science Fair Surprise! (January 2003)
6. Yikes! It's Alive! (April 2003)
7. Whoa! Amusement Park Gone Wild! (July 1, 2003)
8. Wow! Blast from the Past! (October 2003)

=== Spy X series ===
1. The Code (July 1, 2004 - Scholastic)
2. Hide and Seek (October 1, 2004 - Scholastic)
3. Proof Positive (January 1, 2005 - Scholastic)
4. Tunnel Vision (May 1, 2005 - Scholastic)

=== The Party Room series ===
Published under the pseudonym Morgan Burke.

- Get it Started (2005)
- Last Call (2005)
- Lost Girls (omnibus, 2015)

=== Drama Club series ===
1. The Fall Musical (September 6, 2007)
2. The Big Production (September 6, 2007)
3. Too Hot! (March 13, 2008)
4. Summer Stars (July 17, 2008)

=== The 39 Clues series ===
1. The Sword Thief (March 3, 2009)
2. The Viper's Nest (February 2, 2010)
3. Vespers Rising (April 5, 2011)

=== The 39 Clues: Cahills vs. Vespers series ===
- The Dead of Night (March 6, 2012)

=== Seven Wonders series ===
1. The Colossus Rises (February 5, 2013)
2. Lost in Babylon (October 29, 2013)
3. The Tomb of Shadows (May 13, 2014)
4. The Curse of the King (March 3, 2015)
5. The Legend of the Rift (March 8, 2016)

Seven Wonders Journals

1. The Select and The Orphan (April 22, 2014)
2. The Key (February 10, 2015)
3. The Promise (February 9, 2016)

=== Max Tilt series ===
1. Fire the Depths (October 3, 2017)
2. 80 Days or Die (July 24, 2018)
3. Enter the Core (February 19, 2019)

=== Throwback series ===
1. Throwback (October 1, 2019)
2. The Chaos Loop (May 5, 2020)
3. Out of Time (March 23, 2021)

=== Other novels ===
- Smiler's Bones (February 1, 2005)
- wtf (November 10, 2009)
- Somebody, Please Tell Me Who I Am (February 7, 2012), with Harry Mazer
- Beasties (April 22, 2025)

=== Others (ghost-writing, licensed characters) ===
- Star Trek IV: The Voyage Home (junior novelization) (1986), (0-67163-243-4/978-0-67163-243-4)
- License to Drive (novelization) (1988), writing as A. L. Singer
- Sing (novelization) (1989), A. L. Singer (0-59042-151-4/978-0-59042-151-5)
- Little Monsters (novelization) (1989), writing as A. L. Singer
- Dick Tracy (junior novelization) (1990), writing as A. L. Singer (0-307-12400-2)
- Walt Disney's Classic: The Rescuers Down Under (novelization) (1990), writing as A. L. Singer (0-590-44365-8)
- Bingo (novelization) (1991), writing as A. L. Singer
- Disney's Robin Hood (novelization) (1992), writing as A. L. Singer (1-56282-138-5)
- Disney's Beauty and the Beast (novelization) (1992), writing as A. L. Singer (1-56282-051-6)
- Disney's Aladdin (novelization) (1992), writing as A. L. Singer (1-56282-241-1)
- Home Alone 2: Lost in New York (novelization) (November 1, 1992), writing as A. L. Singer
- Walt Disney's Sleeping Beauty (novelization) (1993), writing as A. L. Singer (1-56282-368-X/978-1-56282-368-9)
- Surf Ninjas (novelization) (1993), writing as A. L. Singer
- Miracle on 34th Street (novelization) (1994), writing as A. L. Singer
- The Swan Princess (novelization) (1994), writing as A. L. Singer
- The Amazing Panda Adventure (novelization) (1995), writing as A. L. Singer
- The Baby-Sitters Club (novelization) (1995), writing as A. L. Singer
- Anastasia: Classic Edition (novelization) (1997), writing as A. L. Singer ISBN 0-694-01040-5
- Sleepy Hollow (novelization) (1999) (0-67103-665-3/978-0-67103-665-2
- M. Night Shyamalan's The Sixth Sense: A Novelization (2000) (0-439-20163-2/978-0-439-2016-36)
- The Road to El Dorado (novelization) (2000) (0-7696-1669-0/978-0-7696-1669-8)
- Batman Begins: The Junior Novel (June 2005) (0-439-72509-7/978-0-439-72509-5)

== Awards ==
- Last Stop, the first book in Lerangis's science fiction/mystery series Watchers, was selected by the American Library Association as a 1999 Best Book for Reluctant Readers.
- War, the fourth book in the series Watchers, was selected by the International Reading Association and the Children's Book Council as a 2000 Children's Choice book.
- Lerangis's 2006 historical novel Smiler's Bones was a Junior Library Guild selection and was named among the New York Public Library Best Books for Teens 2006 and the Bank Street Best Books of 2006.
- Somebody Please Tell Me Who I Am was awarded the 2013 Schneider Family Book Award from the American Library Association, given to "honor an author or illustrator for a book that embodies an artistic expression of the disability experience for child and adolescent audiences" and was also chosen that year for the ALA Best Fiction for Young Adults list.
- The Seven Wonders series books have been named Junior Library Guild selections
