= The Three Investigators =

American juvenile detective book series

- Author: Robert Arthur, Jr.
- Language: English
- Genre: Mystery literature Juvenile literature Crime fiction
- Publisher: Random House
- Published: 1964–1987
- Media type: Print (hardcover)

The Three Investigators is an American juvenile detective book series first published as Alfred Hitchcock and the Three Investigators. It was created by Robert Arthur Jr., who believed involving a famous person such as movie director Alfred Hitchcock would attract attention. Random House is the U.S. publisher and still has some of the rights to the books. Other rights are possessed by the heirs of Robert Arthur, Jr. and the German publisher Kosmos. The characters known as the "Three Investigators" are three boys named Jupiter Jones, Peter Crenshaw, and Bob Andrews. As the series has become very popular in Germany, over 200 books have been produced directly for the German market.

Most of the novels cover some sort of mysterious events that seem to be supernatural at first (e.g. an ancient Egyptian mummy that appears to be whispering) but are ultimately explained scientifically.

== Original editions ==
The original series was published from 1964 to 1987 and had 43 finished books, one unfinished story (The Mystery of the Ghost Train) and four Find Your Fate books. Between 1989 and 1990 Random House published the Three Investigators Crimebusters series.

Books number 1 to 9 and 11 were written by the creator, Robert Arthur, who also specified ideas for a few of the other stories. Arthur had been an editor for several book collections attributed to Alfred Hitchcock. The other authors were William Arden (Dennis Lynds), Nick West (Kin Platt), Mary Virginia Carey and Marc Brandel (born Marcus Beresford). All of the authors wrote their own introductions and epilogues, which were dictated purportedly by Hitchcock and later in the series a fictional writer, Hector Sebastian, who supposedly recorded the adventures of the Three Investigators from their words. The illustrators in the series began with Harry Kane and Ed Vebell and include Jack Hearne, Herb Mott, Stephen Marchesi, Robert Adragna and William A. ("Bill") Dodge.

For the original series, the specific ages of the investigators were never revealed, but contextual information indicates that they were likely 13 or 14 years old. They were not old enough to drive a car legally, but were said to be just a few years younger than their nemesis Skinny Norris, who had a driver's license from a state where the required age for a license was younger. On one occasion, it was mentioned that Pete was part of the high-school wrestling team. In the later Crimebusters series, it was stated once that the Three Investigators team was initiated when the boys were 13.

The investigators were typically introduced to a mystery by a client or by finding something unusual accidentally in the junkyard of Jupiter's Uncle Titus Jones and Aunt Mathilda, who had a salvage business. The boys encountered baffling, sometimes misleading, clues and danger before finally solving the mystery. The series had one major theme: however strange, mystical, or even supernatural a particular phenomenon may seem at first, it is capable of being traced to human agency with the determined application of reason and logic. This theme was compromised on four occasions by Carey: in The Mystery of Monster Mountain, the boys encounter Bigfoot; in The Invisible Dog, she canonizes astral projection and dangles the possibility of a "phantom priest"; in The Mystery of the Scar-Faced Beggar, a woman has genuine prophetic dreams; and in the final book of the original run, The Mystery of the Cranky Collector, a young woman's ghost returns to haunt her former employer's mansion.

Most mysteries were solved by Jupiter Jones, a supreme logician who implicitly used the Occam's Razor principle: that the simplest and most rational explanation should be preferred to an explanation which requires additional assumptions. The boys were able to solve their mysteries with relatively few resources: they generally had little more than a telephone, bicycles, access to a library and—with reference to the Hollywood setting of the series—a chauffeur-driven Rolls-Royce (which Jupiter wins the use of in the first book).

In the first book, The Secret of Terror Castle, Jupiter bluffs his way into the office of director Alfred Hitchcock and makes a deal with him that if the Investigators can find him a haunted house to use as a location for his next movie, Hitchcock will introduce the story of their adventures. Hitchcock agrees, not expecting them to succeed; but at the end of the book is impressed with the boys' investigation and not only introduces the book but also refers several other future clients to them in subsequent novels. The last chapter of each book was usually an epilogue in which the investigators sat with Alfred Hitchcock (and later, Hector Sebastian), reviewing the mystery and revealing the deductions through the clues discussed earlier in the book.

In 1989, Random House revamped the series, naming it The 3 Investigators—Crimebusters Series. The investigators were now 17 years old, could drive cars and were much more independent. The stories continued to include an abundance of detective work, but with the addition of more action. The series was well received but was halted during 1990, when legal disagreements between Random House and the heirs of the Arthur estate could not be resolved. By 2005, the disagreements were still not settled.

Eleven novels were published in the CrimeBusters series, which was initiated by one of the series' authors, William Arden, pseudonym of Dennis Lynds, who wrote the Dan Fortune mystery series for adults by the pseudonym Michael Collins. The other authors were: H. William Stine and wife Megan Stine, G.H. Stone (Gayle Lynds), William MacCay, Marc Brandel and Peter Lerangis. Random House has reprinted several of the original books as two paperback reprint series, partly to assure their legal rights.

Between 1964 and 1990, Random House published a total of 56 books. After the discontinuation of the series in 1990, a German author team began writing new books under the commission of the Franckh Kosmos publishing house in 1993. In 2011, three previously unpublished novels by the US authors Peter Lerangis, Megan and H. William Stine and G. H. Stone were published in Germany.

== Premise ==
The Three Investigators are a junior detective team that initially came together because of a mental exercise club. They live in Rocky Beach, a fictional coastal town between Los Angeles and Santa Barbara. In some of their cases, the boys are supported by Alfred Hitchcock, the chauffeur Worthington, and the police inspectors Reynolds and Cotta. “We Investigate Anything” is The Three Investigators' trademark slogan on their business card. Most often, Jupiter is the one to hand over the card in a fitting moment to see the clients’ reactions to the three question marks. Often, that reaction is a joke, with the clients asking whether the question marks mean the investigators doubt their own abilities. Jupiter usually retorts something like: “That's our symbol. [...] The question marks stand for mysteries unsolved, riddles unanswered, puzzles of any kind. So we use it as our trademark. We investigate any kind of mystery.”

To prove themselves, The Three Investigators usually have a lot of persuading to do in the beginning, as the clients often mistrust their abilities because the investigators are so young.

In their first cases, The Three Investigators also provide, apart from their business card, a letter of recommendation from the Police Department of Rocky Beach signed by Chief Samuel Reynolds. It says: "The holder of this badge is a junior volunteer assistant to the Police Department of Rocky Beach. The authority advocates any support from third parties."

=== Jupiter ===
Jupiter "Jupe" Jones, First Investigator—A former child actor named "Baby Fatso", although he hates it when people mention this. Jupiter is intelligent and stocky, and has a remarkable memory and deductive skills. Jupiter's parents (professional ballroom dancers) died in an accident when he was four years old. Although “An Ear for Danger” mentions a car accident as their cause of death, in the episode “... das leere Grab” (German only), they are said to have disappeared following a plane crash. Jupiter lives with his uncle and aunt, Titus and Mathilda Jones, who manage a scrapyard.

Jupiter's past acting ability benefits him frequently in mysteries because he can act older than he is, perform imitations of people when necessary and act less intelligent to extract information from potential suspects.

Jupiter is a prolific reader and inventor and frequently invents a device that simplifies solving a mystery. Jupiter has a knack for interpreting clues to solve otherwise unsolvable mysteries. He also likes to play pranks on the other two investigators. Because of his intellectual side, Jupe is adept at using big words and frequently uses them to his advantage, particularly to seem older, annoy Pete, and startle adults. Jupe hates to dismiss an unsolved mystery, which frequently means that he drags Bob and Pete along for the ride.

=== Peter ===
Peter "Pete" Crenshaw, Second Investigator—Pete is an athletic youth who dislikes dangerous situations, but is nonetheless reliable as the "action member" of the team. Pete loves and cares for animals, and is fond of uttering the exclamation "Gleeps!". His father works as a film technician for special effects in Hollywood.

Pete is a frequent companion of Jupiter on stake-outs and other field trips, particularly in the earlier mysteries, when Bob is unavailable. While he may not have the intellectual ability of Jupiter, Pete is nonetheless considered as an equal in the stories and is able to point out Jupiter's own shortcomings (usually in a comical fashion). He is also capable of making deductions and sometimes serves as the clue-bearer instead of Bob. He has an excellent sense of direction, as in The Mystery of the Stuttering Parrot.

=== Bob ===
Robert "Bob" Andrews, Records and Research—Bob is studious and meticulous, and wears glasses. Depending on the case, Bob's father is a sports writer, business journalist, or political journalist, and occasionally helps The Three Investigators in some of their cases.

Early in the series, Bob is hampered physically by a leg brace he wore, due to multiple fractures suffered when he rolled down a hill. This handicap relegated him to a more studious and less physical involvement. Bob works part-time in the local library, suiting his role as data collector. Bob also serves as the clue-bearer for many of the adventures, because of his research at the library. Bob's leg brace is removed between the end of Whispering Mummy and the beginning of Green Ghost.

=== Headquarters ===
Part workshop, hideaway, and detective office, the Three Investigators maintain their headquarters in an old house trailer hidden among piles of junk at the edge of the Jones's scrapyard. The house trailer is outfitted with multiple secret exits, a small lab, darkroom, telephone, typewriter, and reference works. Jupiter often used spare parts salvaged from the scrapyard to build equipment for the team, including a tape recorder and periscope.

== Copyright dispute ==
=== Initial position ===
The series was invented by American writer Robert Arthur in the US in 1964. Arthur sold the international exploitation rights to the publisher Random House; however, he retained the copyright. The contract included the rights to publish books, films, comics and mechanical sound reproduction. Since there was no significant audio book market at that time, it is legally not clearly determinable and therefore doubtful whether this "mechanical sound reproduction" describes the medium of audio books or radio plays as they exist now. The Franckh-Kosmos publisher of Random House acquired the German-speaking exploitation rights in 1968. The label EUROPA received the rights to the audio version of the series as part of the sublicense partners of the Kosmos Verlag.

After Robert Arthur's death in 1969, the copyrights were given to the University of Michigan. In his will, Arthur declared that "all rights, legal titles and stakes, [he] owned by the time of [his] death, concerning all published books, short stories, plays or unpublished manuscripts, including all issued copyright claims, just as all rights for license fees and subsidiary rights, as it is specified in [his] contracts with publishers" were to be given to the University of Michigan.

Since then Random House had been paying royalties to the university, but they stopped doing so as of 1992, because it was not clear whether the University of Michigan still had a legal entitlement. The American copyright law said that literature that received a copyright before 1977 had a safeguard clause that made sure that all licenses automatically returned to the author or his heirs after 28 years. As a result of that, Random House and Arthur's heirs, his children Elizabeth Ann Arthur and Robert Andrew Arthur, signed a contract for the rights of use of the volumes of Arthur and the further usage of the characters, under the condition that the 10 books were to be brought back onto the American market.

After the series was discontinued in the US in 1991, Kosmos Verlag sought the rights to continue the series in Germany with German authors, and in 1994 signed a corresponding contract with Random House without the consent of Arthur's heirs.

In 2002, Random House returned the rights of the ten volumes to Robert Arthur's heirs after the publisher failed to comply with the agreed republications of the works. In 1999, however, Kosmos-Verlag had already registered the word mark Die Drei ??? throughout Germany and by 2003 throughout Europe as well as a European trademark for audio carriers and printed products.

Negotiations between Kosmos Verlag and the heirs on a new usage rights agreement failed because Kosmos relied on its trademark registration and ongoing agreements with Random House. Furthermore, Kosmos doubted that Arthur's heirs were the right holders since according to Arthur's will, all rights were to be transferred to the University of Michigan. At the end of 2004, Random House and Kosmos signed an extensive agreement to transfer all rights to the other American novels not written by Arthur to Kosmos Verlag.

=== Lawsuit ===
Due to the unclear legal situation, EUROPA decided at the beginning of 2005 not to publish any further episodes based on the book templates of Kosmos Verlag and discontinued the license payments to Kosmos. At that time the books “Spur ins Nichts” and “...und der Geisterzug” (both German only) had already been recorded as a radio play.

In 2006, the parent company of the European label Sony Music Entertainment (formerly Sony BMG) finally gained all the German rights on Arthur's creations and the use of the original characters and showplaces independently from Kosmos publishing house of Robert Arthur's successors. The contract contained the right to order new books in German, as well as the right to evaluate the sound storage medium. Moreover, all were transferred: from "[...] interests [of Arthur's children] in all German audio recordings, bound books, pocketbooks, theatrical performances and electronic film recordings of theatrical performances to all existing derived products in Sony BMG". EUROPA developed a new audio book named "DiE DR3i" based on it. Indeed, EUROPA avoided the use of the name "Die Drei ???" and also the name created by Kosmos because of the protection of the brand. Instead of that only characters and names which were based on Arthur's ideas were used (characters’ original names).

The Kosmos publishing house continued its series of books under well-known titles and with famous character's names. The society filed a lawsuit against the Kosmos publishing house because Sony BMG itself saw its exploitation rights violated. A provisional disposal was obtained against the sale of two novels “Spuk im Netz” and “Der Fluch des Drachen” (both German only).

Because of this, the two books had to be taken off the market retroactively. This verdict was overturned by the Higher Regional Court in Düsseldorf on May 13, 2007. The judges were unable to identify Robert Arthur's children as the rightful owners of the copyright law. They found that the University of Michigan rightfully inherited the works of Robert Arthur and his characters, meaning that his heirs could not have transferred the rights to Sony BMG. A due date was set for the complainant of Sony BMG to submit the new chain-of-title as well as the new contracts as they were available to her. Eventually, Kosmos and Sony BMG negotiated again to come to an extrajudicial agreement, causing the delivery of Episode 7 of "DiE DR3i" to be delayed. The final release date of Episodes 7 and 8 was 30 November 2007.

=== Outcome ===
In February 2008, Sony BMG and Kosmos came to an agreement. The rights to the books as well as the brand name, which were the foundation for the audio dramas remained with Kosmos as well as all other publishing products, including calendars, non-fiction literature, mobile and computer games, science kits and board games.

The rights to use audio material with the inclusion of the entire catalog as well as stage shows, plays and the commercialization of merchandise remain with the record label Europa.

Since 4 April 2008, new German editions under the name “Die Drei ???” have been published, based on the books published by Kosmos. The rights to continue the audio plays “Die Drei ??? Kids” were transferred to Europa as well. The already published audio play episodes were sold by the previous license holder USM until late 2008. Furthermore, a withdrawal of the series "DiE DR3i" from sale until 1 January 2009 was agreed upon.

Since 1999, the spin-off series “Die Drei ??? Kids”, issued by publisher Kosmos, has been supposed to target a much younger audience. The contents of the stories were thus tailored to be more suitable for children and to be less complex. Besides, with an age of only ten years, the young detectives are considerably younger than in the current episodes of the original series.

== International and foreign-language editions ==
=== Bangladesh ===
The Three Investigators have also been published in Bangladesh by Sheba Prokashoni as Tin Goyenda (translated by Rakib Hasan) since 1985 and appealed to many young Bangladeshi readers till this day. In the Bengali editions, Jupiter Jones is known as Kishor Pasha (কিশোর পাশা, a Bangladeshi American). The other two are named as Musa Aman (মুসা আমান, African American) and Robin Milford (রবিন মিলফোর্ড, Irish American). Other characters include Rashed Chacha (রাশেদচাচা, corresponding to Uncle Titus), Mary Chachi (মেরিচাচী, corresponding to Aunt Mathilda), Georgina 'Gina' Parker and her pet dog Ruffian, the chauffeur Hanson, Bavarian brothers Boris and Rover, and movie director Davis Christopher (in place of Alfred Hitchcock). The character Skinny Norris appears as Shutki Terry (শুঁটকি টেরি) and the famous French art thief appears as Chaupain (শোঁপা). The character Victor Simon in the Bangladeshi edition appears in the place of "Hector Sebastian". The stories are generally set in Rocky Beach, California, although the investigators travel to exotic places like Africa and Bangladesh on occasions. The stories featuring Gina and her pet dog Ruffian were actually a Bangla adaptation from The Famous Five by Enid Blyton. The name Gina is a short form of 'Georgina' which was the same name used in The Famous Five. She also owns a pet dog in The Famous Five series, named Timmy. A total of 152 books have been published till the National Book Fair of 2020 in Bangladesh.

=== Denmark ===
In Denmark, 13 books were published from 1966–70 by Hasselbalch under the title "Alfred Hitchcock og De tre Detektiver". Most of the rest were also released in the following years by Lademann.

=== Finland ===
46 books were published in Finland by Gummerus between 1975 and 1990 under the title "Alfred Hitchcock 3 Etsivää". Translations include all the 43 books from the original series, but in slightly different order than in US, 2 from the Find Your Fate series (#44 The Case of the Weeping Coffin and #45 The Case of the Dancing Dinosaur) and 1 from the Crimebusters series (#46 Hot Wheels).

=== France ===
In France, the original nine books were published during the 1970s by the Bibliothèque verte collection of books for young readers under the title "Les Trois Jeunes Détectives" ("The Three young detectives").. Throughout the 1980s and 1990s, the series continued. As a whole, 37 volumes (including four of the Crimebusters series) has been published.

=== Germany ===
The Three Investigators books have always been very popular in Germany. In 1968 the Kosmos publishing company started to publish translations of the 43 original books which they retitled Die drei ??? (Die drei Fragezeichen, meaning "The Three Question Marks"). Kosmos also renamed Jupiter Jones as "Justus Jonas" and shortened Peter Crenshaw's name to "Peter Shaw". Bob Andrews retained his original name. In 1993 Kosmos started to publish new written books by German authors.

In 1979 the German publisher Europa started a radio drama based on the books, as published by Kosmos. All in all, as of September 2024, this resulted in 234 books (usually 6 books per year, 3 during spring and 3 during autumn) and 229 radio dramas published. In 2005, a litigation between Kosmos and Europa disallowed the latter to use the German names introduced by Kosmos. Subsequently, Europa published a nine episode radio drama named "DiE DR3i" between 2005 and 2007. "DiE DR3i" were mostly identical to "Die drei ???" and they also used the same German voice-actors, but changed the disallowed names to their English originals. "DiE Dr3i" were stopped when Europa and Kosmos reached an agreement and "Die drei ???" resumed again.

Taped radio dramas (Hörspiele) of the novels have been especially popular in Germany with most of them having been certified Gold or Platinum by the German Federal Association of Music Industry. In total, the radio dramas have sold more than 45 million copies and the books about 16 million copies in Germany (2013). A study conducted in 2009 by the series' publisher Europa suggests that nowadays, most fans are between 20 and 45 years of age.

The radio actors, who have been narrating the plays since 1979, toured the country multiple times to perform plays in front of a live-audience. They broke their own Guinness World Record when performing Phonophobia – Symphony of Fear in front of 20,000 people at Berlin Waldbühne during 2014.

In the booklet of the German audio play The Mystery of the Invisible Dog, the episode upon which it was based is credited erroneously to Nick West. Moreover, in Germany there are different revised editions of The Mystery of the Scar-faced Beggar: one using Alfred Hitchcock as their patron, one using Alfred Hitchcock and Hector Sebastian, and another one using only Hector Sebastian (in Germany renamed as "Albert Hitfield").

New English-language Three Investigators titles were released during 2005 for the first time since 1990. The German 'American-English' series included the release of Poisoned E-Mail and The Curse of the Cell Phone. As of May 2008, a total of seven German stories had been translated and published in this format, and an eighth title was planned for publication during October 2008.

In 2006, following the example of “Die drei ???”/"The Three Investigators", a detective series specifically for girls titled “Die drei !!!” was launched by publisher Franckh-Kosmos. In a similar way as the original, the book series contains stories about a teenage detective trio, only this time consisting of three girls; the stories take place in a big German city.

The band Jupiter Jones, formed in 2002, named themselves after the original name of the first detective Jupiter Jones (Justus Jonas in German). The rock band Karpatenhund ("Carpathian Dog") from Cologne named themselves after a title of one episode ("Mystery of the Invisible Dog"). On the album “Bordsteinkantengeschichten” by the band Muff Potter, a long scream from the episode “Der seltsame Wecker” ("Mystery of the Screaming Clock") can be heard. The intro and outro of the album “Alles auf Schwarz” by the rock band Montreal (band) from Hamburg are narrated by Oliver Rohrbeck in the role of Justus Jonas, but without mentioning Justus’ name. Techno musician and sound artist Phillip Sollmann adapted his pseudonym Efdemin from the character Mihai Eftimin in the episode "Die flammende Spur" ("The flaming trace").

=== Greece ===
In Greece, The Three Investigators have been published as Oi Treis Ntetektiv (Οι Τρεις Ντετέκτιβ) since 1990 by Psichogios Publications and earlier by others.

=== India ===
The Three Investigators books have been published in India, in addition to the original American versions, by the name of "Bal Secret Agent 555 Ranga, Ganga & Shirazi". Ranga is Pete, Ganga is Jupe and Shirazi is Bob. These were published by Khel Khiladi Prakashan, West Patel Nagar, Delhi during the 1970s.

=== Indonesia ===
The Three Investigators books have been published in Indonesia under the name of Trio Detektif. These were published by Gramedia Pustaka Utama (the biggest book publisher in Indonesia), Jakarta from the 1980s to 1990.

=== Israel ===
Twenty of the titles have been translated into Hebrew, and published by the M Mizrahi publishing house between 1987 and 1995. Nineteen of these were translated by "Avner Carmeli", a pen name of the children's writer Shraga Gafni.

=== Italy ===
In Italy, the Three Investigators novels have been published in paperback form by Mondadori, during the 1970s and 1980s, within their Il giallo dei ragazzi series, which included the Hardy Boys, Nancy Drew and other juvenile sleuths' adventures. The cover author for the Three Investigators books was always Alfred Hitchcock, whereas the inner copyright notice correctly reported the real author (although saying "Text by ...").

=== Japan ===
In Japan, the series was published three times.

From 1969 to 1971, 4 books were published by Nihon Publishing.

In 1976, 6 books were published by Kaiseisha (Originally, 10 books were planned to be published). They were illustrated by Ken Ishikawa and Dynamic Productions.

From 1987 to 1988, 10 books were published by Kaiseisha, yet again. They were not exactly the same as the publication planned for 1976, and 2 from the Find Your Fate series.

=== Latin ===
The German demand for the adventures of The Three Investigators produced another offshoot in 2011. Ulrich Krauße translated The Curse of the Dragon into Latin with three German Latin teachers working as proofreaders. Krauße's translation, titled De Tribus Investigatoribus et Fato Draconis, was popular in Germany among students of Latin.

=== Lithuania ===
The Three Investigators books have been published in Lithuania and were popular among teenagers.

=== Norway ===
23 books were published in Norway by Forlagshuset between 1969 and 1981 "Alfred Hitchcock og de tre Detektivene".

=== Pakistan ===
Thirteen stories of The Three Investigators have been published in Pakistan, in Urdu, as Teen nanhay suraghrasaan (تین ننھے سراغ رساں) in 1977/78 by Ferozsons Publishers. They have also been published in the monthly Taleem-o-Tarbiat magazine for children. The names of the characters are "Umber" (عنبر, Jupiter Jones), "Naseem" (نسیم, Pete) and "Aaqib" (عاقب, Bob). The name of their Mercedes Benz driver is Allahdad (الله‌داد). They live in Karimabad. Umber is tall and lanky as opposed to Jupiter's character, who is stocky. Naseem, like Pete, is the most athletic of all. The translators are Saleem Ahmed Siddiqui and Maqbool Jahangir. They have done a good job adapting the stories to match Pakistani culture and geography.

=== Poland ===
Sixty-one original stories (including Crimebusters) have been published in Poland (by Siedmiorog), where they were recently still very popular.

=== Portugal ===
In Portugal, the Three Investigators novels started to be published in hard cover edition by Clássica Editora, within Os melhores livros juvenis series, which included other juvenile adventures by authors such as Erich Kästner, Enid Blyton and E.W. Hildick.

The first book published was The Secret of Terror Castle in the 1970s (second edition in 1978). The cover author for the Three Investigators books was always Alfred Hitchcock. In the first editions the inner copyright notice correctly reported the real author (although saying "written in cooperation with...").

=== Russia ===
The books have been popular among teenagers in Russia under the name of 'Три сыщика' (Three Detectives). It was a part of series 'Детский детектив' (juvenile detectives). Published between 1992 and 1998.

=== Slovakia ===
The books have also been very popular among children and teenagers in Slovakia where the books were published by Mladé Letá under the name 'Traja pátrači'. 99 books have been translated from the original, Crimebuster and German series, but not in order of original release.

=== Southeast Asia ===
In the French, Vietnamese, Thai, Indonesian and Italian version of the series, the books were at one time published with Alfred Hitchcock listed as their author. The same error was made in some German paperback editions published at the beginning of the 1980s.

Similarly, all British Armada paperback editions of the title The Mystery of the Moaning Cave are credited erroneously to Robert Arthur. Moreover, the British series reversed the order of #42 and #43, meaning that the Armada original series ends with Wreckers' Rock.

=== Spain ===
In Spain, The Mystery of the Moaning Cave, The Mystery of the Laughing Shadow, The Secret of the Crooked Cat, The Mystery of the Coughing Dragon, The Mystery of Monster Mountain as well as The Mystery of the Headless Horse are erroneously credited to Robert Arthur. The new Latin-American edition has the name of Los tres detectives instead of Los Tres Investigadores, which was used in Spain for earlier editions. Catalan translations were also published.

=== Sweden ===
All the original 43 were published in Sweden under the name Alfred Hitchcock och Tre Deckare. They were published as part of the youth fiction series from publisher B. Wahlströms.

== Adaptations, references, and continuation series ==
in 1984 the first two stories from the series were adapted into heavily abridged audioplays by Edward Kelsey and released by Rainbow Communications; both were directed by Tony Bilbow.

In Germany, the franchise has also been adapted into audioplays and graphic novels.

In 2007, a Three Investigators movie, The Three Investigators and the Secret of Skeleton Island, was released in Germany, starring Chancellor Miller as Jupiter (named Justus in the German film), Nick Price as Peter, and Cameron Monaghan as Bob. It was followed in 2009 by The Three Investigators and the Secret of Terror Castle. Although adopting the same titles as two of the novels, and some of the characters, the stories in the films are significantly different from those in the books on which they are based. The series was not continued.

A new film series released by Sony Pictures Entertainment started in 2023 with a new cast comprising Julius Weckauf as Justus, Nevio Wendt as Peter, and Levi Brandl as Bob.The movies of this series are The Three Investigators and the Legacy of the Dragon (2023), The Three Investigators and the Carpathian Dog (2025) and The Three Investigators: Isle of Death (2026). A fourth movie, The Three Investigators: Night of Fear, has been filmed and is announced to be released in August 2027.

The 2021 computer game ELEX II features the mission 'Hitch and the Three Investigators', an homage to the book series.

In 2020 Elizabeth Arthur (daughter of series creator Robert Arthur Jr.) announced a continuation of the series to be set in contemporary times. Further details revealed the series to be a set of twenty-six novels (one for each letter of the alphabet), set two years after The Secret of Terror Castle. The books are thematically linked as one larger arc. The first three books were made available in eBook format in March 2025.
