= 1978 in the United States =

- Decades: 1950s; 1960s; 1970s; 1980s; 1990s
- See also: History of the United States (1964–1980); Timeline of United States history (1970–1989); List of years in the United States

Events from the year 1978 in the United States.

== Incumbents ==
=== Federal government ===
- President: Jimmy Carter (D-Georgia)
- Vice President: Walter Mondale (D-Minnesota)
- Chief Justice: Warren E. Burger (Virginia)
- Speaker of the House of Representatives: Tip O'Neill (D-Massachusetts)
- Senate Majority Leader: Robert Byrd (D-West Virginia)
- Congress: 95th

==== State governments ====
Governors and lieutenant governors

=== Governors ===
- Governor of Alabama: George Wallace (Democratic)
- Governor of Alaska: Jay Hammond (Republican)
- Governor of Arizona: Wesley Bolin (Democratic) (until March 4), Bruce Babbitt (Democratic) (starting March 4)
- Governor of Arkansas: David Pryor (Democratic)
- Governor of California: Jerry Brown (Democratic)
- Governor of Colorado: Richard Lamm (Democratic)
- Governor of Connecticut: Ella T. Grasso (Democratic)
- Governor of Delaware: Pierre S. du Pont, IV (Republican)
- Governor of Florida: Reubin Askew (Democratic)
- Governor of Georgia: George Busbee (Democratic)
- Governor of Hawaii: George Ariyoshi (Democratic)
- Governor of Idaho: John V. Evans (Democratic)
- Governor of Illinois: James R. Thompson (Republican)
- Governor of Indiana: Otis R. Bowen (Republican)
- Governor of Iowa: Robert D. Ray (Republican)
- Governor of Kansas: Robert F. Bennett (Republican)
- Governor of Kentucky: Julian M. Carroll (Democratic)
- Governor of Louisiana: Edwin W. Edwards (Democratic)
- Governor of Maine: James B. Longley (Independent)
- Governor of Maryland: Marvin Mandel (Democratic)
- Governor of Massachusetts: Michael Dukakis (Democratic)
- Governor of Michigan: William Milliken (Republican)
- Governor of Minnesota: Rudy Perpich (Democratic)
- Governor of Mississippi: Cliff Finch (Democratic)
- Governor of Missouri: Joseph P. Teasdale (Democratic)
- Governor of Montana: Thomas Lee Judge (Democratic)
- Governor of Nebraska: J. James Exon (Democratic)
- Governor of Nevada: Mike O'Callaghan (Democratic)
- Governor of New Hampshire: Meldrim Thomson, Jr. (Republican)
- Governor of New Jersey: Brendan Byrne (Democratic)
- Governor of New Mexico: Jerry Apodaca (Democratic)
- Governor of New York: Hugh Carey (Democratic)
- Governor of North Carolina: Jim Hunt (Democratic)
- Governor of North Dakota: Arthur A. Link (Democratic)
- Governor of Ohio: Jim Rhodes (Republican)
- Governor of Oklahoma: David L. Boren (Democratic)
- Governor of Oregon: Robert W. Straub (Democratic)
- Governor of Pennsylvania: Milton Shapp (Democratic)
- Governor of Rhode Island: J. Joseph Garrahy (Democratic)
- Governor of South Carolina: James B. Edwards (Republican)
- Governor of South Dakota: Richard F. Kneip (Democratic) (until July 24), Harvey L. Wollman (Democratic) (starting July 24)
- Governor of Tennessee: Ray Blanton (Democratic)
- Governor of Texas: Dolph Briscoe (Democratic)
- Governor of Utah: Scott M. Matheson (Democratic)
- Governor of Vermont: Richard A. Snelling (Republican)
- Governor of Virginia: Mills E. Godwin, Jr. (Republican) (until January 14), John N. Dalton (Republican) (starting January 14)
- Governor of Washington: Dixy Lee Ray (Democratic)
- Governor of West Virginia: Jay Rockefeller (Democratic)
- Governor of Wisconsin: Martin J. Schreiber (Democratic)
- Governor of Wyoming: Edgar J. Herschler (Democratic)

=== Lieutenant governors ===
- Lieutenant Governor of Alabama: Jere Beasley (Democratic)
- Lieutenant Governor of Alaska: Lowell Thomas, Jr. (Republican) (until December 4), Terry Miller (Republican) (starting December 4)
- Lieutenant Governor of Arkansas: Joe Purcell (Democratic)
- Lieutenant Governor of California: Mervyn M. Dymally (Democratic)
- Lieutenant Governor of Colorado: George L. Brown (Democratic)
- Lieutenant Governor of Connecticut: Robert K. Killian (Democratic)
- Lieutenant Governor of Delaware: James D. McGinnis (Democratic)
- Lieutenant Governor of Florida: J.H. Williams (Democratic)
- Lieutenant Governor of Georgia: Zell Miller (Democratic)
- Lieutenant Governor of Hawaii: Nelson Doi (Democratic) (until December 2), Jean King (Democratic) (starting December 2)
- Lieutenant Governor of Idaho: William J. Murphy (Democratic)
- Lieutenant Governor of Illinois: Dave O'Neal (Republican)
- Lieutenant Governor of Indiana: Robert D. Orr (Republican)
- Lieutenant Governor of Iowa: Arthur A. Neu (Republican)
- Lieutenant Governor of Kansas: Shelby Smith (Republican)
- Lieutenant Governor of Kentucky: Thelma Stovall (Democratic)
- Lieutenant Governor of Louisiana: Jimmy Fitzmorris (Democratic)
- Lieutenant Governor of Maryland: Blair Lee III (political party unknown)
- Lieutenant Governor of Massachusetts: Thomas P. O'Neill III (Democratic)
- Lieutenant Governor of Michigan: James Damman (Republican)
- Lieutenant Governor of Minnesota: Alec G. Olson (Democratic)
- Lieutenant Governor of Mississippi: Evelyn Gandy (Democratic)
- Lieutenant Governor of Missouri: William C. Phelps (Republican)
- Lieutenant Governor of Montana: Ted Schwinden (Democratic)
- Lieutenant Governor of Nebraska: Gerald Whelan (Democratic)
- Lieutenant Governor of Nevada: Robert E. Rose (Democratic)
- Lieutenant Governor of New Mexico: Robert E. Ferguson (Democratic)
- Lieutenant Governor of New York: Mary Anne Krupsak (Democratic) (until end of December 31)
- Lieutenant Governor of North Carolina: James C. Green (Democratic)
- Lieutenant Governor of North Dakota: Wayne G. Sanstead (Democratic)
- Lieutenant Governor of Ohio: Dick Celeste (Democratic)
- Lieutenant Governor of Oklahoma: George Nigh (Democratic)
- Lieutenant Governor of Pennsylvania: Ernest P. Kline (Democratic)
- Lieutenant Governor of Rhode Island: Thomas R. DiLuglio (Democratic)
- Lieutenant Governor of South Carolina: W. Brantley Harvey, Jr. (Democratic)
- Lieutenant Governor of South Dakota: Harvey L. Wollman (Democratic) (until July 23), vacant (starting July 23)
- Lieutenant Governor of Tennessee: John S. Wilder (Democratic)
- Lieutenant Governor of Texas: William P. Hobby, Jr. (Democratic)
- Lieutenant Governor of Utah: David Smith Monson (Republican)
- Lieutenant Governor of Vermont: T. Garry Buckley (Republican)
- Lieutenant Governor of Virginia: John N. Dalton (Republican) (until January 14), Chuck Robb (Democratic) (starting January 14)
- Lieutenant Governor of Washington: John Cherberg (Democratic)
- Lieutenant Governor of Wisconsin: Martin J. Schreiber (Democratic)

== Events ==
=== January ===
- January 1
  - The Copyright Act of 1976 takes effect, making sweeping changes to United States copyright law.
  - Edward M. Davis retires from the Los Angeles Police Department, after 30 years on the force and more than 8 years as its police chief.
- January 6 – The Holy Crown of Hungary (also known as the Crown of St. Stephen) is returned to Hungary from the United States, where it was held since World War II.
- January 14–15 – The body of former U.S. Vice President Hubert Humphrey lies in state in the Capitol Rotunda, following his death from cancer.
- January 14 – The Sex Pistols hold their last concert, at the Winterland Ballroom in San Francisco.
- January 15 – Ted Bundy commits an infamous murder and assault at the Chi Omega Sorority House at Florida State University.
- January 15 – The Dallas Cowboys defeat the Denver Broncos at Super Bowl XII
- January 16 – Robert F. Rock succeeds Edward M. Davis as the LAPD's interim chief.
- January 19 – Federal Appeals Court Judge William H. Webster is appointed Director of the Federal Bureau of Investigation.
- January 25–27 – The Great Blizzard of 1978 strikes the Ohio Valley and the Great Lakes, causing 51 deaths in Ohio.
- January 28 – Richard Chase, the "Vampire of Sacramento", is arrested.

=== February ===
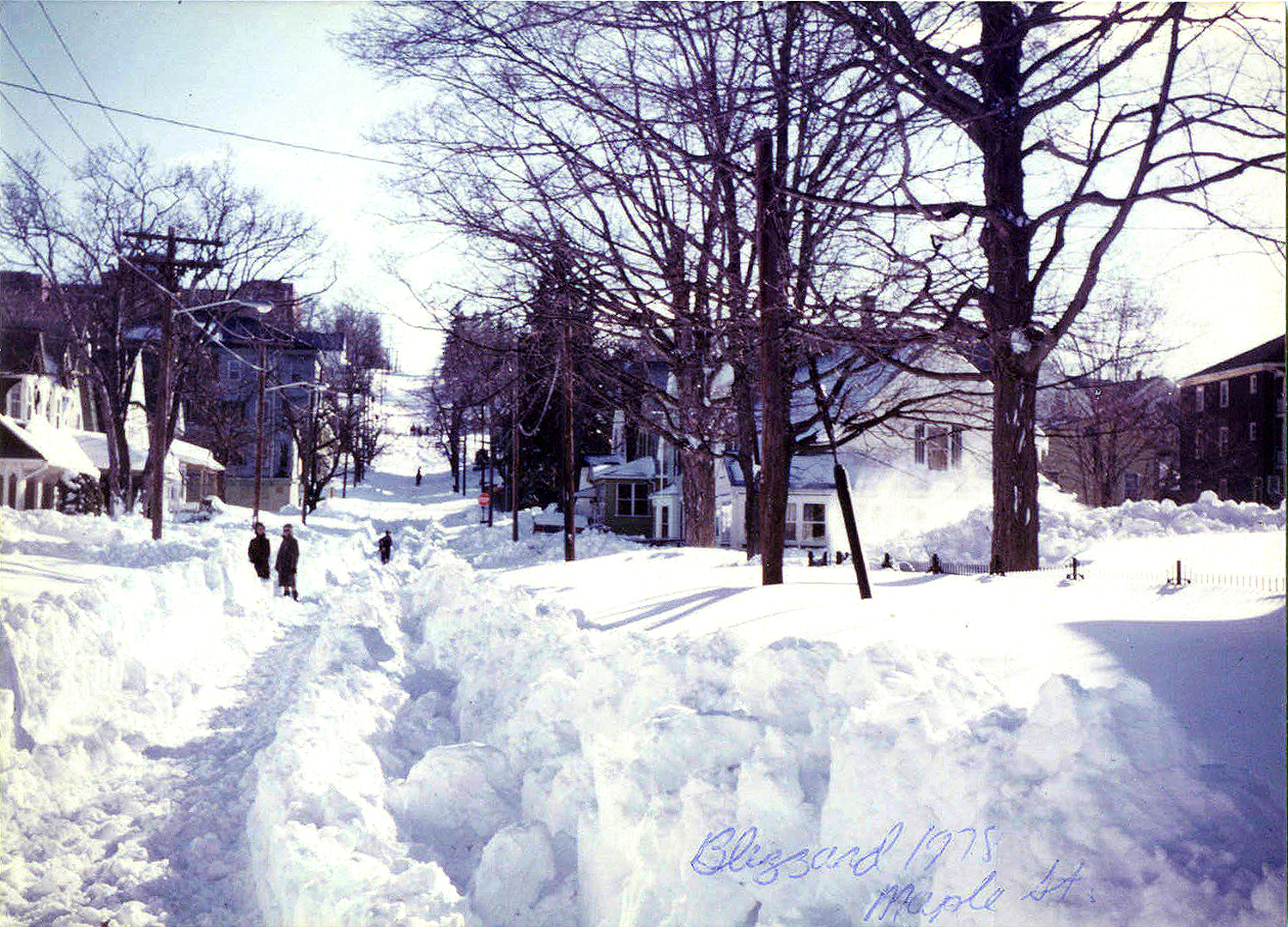
February 5–7: Northeastern United States blizzard of 1978

- February 1 – Hollywood film director Roman Polanski flees to France to avoid sentencing after pleading guilty to unlawful sex with a minor.
- February 5–7 – The Northeastern United States blizzard of 1978 hits the New England region and the New York metropolitan area, killing about 100 and causing over US$520 million in damage.
- February 6 – The first Home Depot opens in Marietta, Georgia.
- February 8 – United States Senate proceedings are broadcast on radio for the first time.
- February 9 – The Budd Company unveils its first SPV-2000 self-propelled railcar in Philadelphia, Pennsylvania.
- February 11 – Sixteen Unification Church couples wed in New York, New York.
- February 15 – Serial killer Ted Bundy is recaptured in Pensacola, Florida.
- February 16
  - The Hillside Strangler, a serial killer prowling Los Angeles, claims a 10th and final victim.
  - The first computer bulletin board system (CBBS) is created in Chicago.
- February 24 – Five men with mild mental-health issues from Yuba City, California disappear in the snow on their way home from a basketball game. In June, four of the bodies are discovered in the Sierra. The fifth, Gary Mathias, is never found. The circumstances surrounding their deaths remains a mystery.

=== March ===
- March 3 – The New York Post publishes an article about David Rorvik's book The Cloning of Man, about a supposed cloning of a human being.
- March 6 – American porn publisher Larry Flynt is shot and paralyzed in Lawrenceville, Georgia.
- March 22 – Karl Wallenda of the Flying Wallendas dies after falling off a tight-rope between two hotels in San Juan, Puerto Rico.
- March 28 – Stump v. Sparkman (435 U.S. 349): The Supreme Court of the United States hands down a 5–3 decision in a controversial case involving involuntary sterilization and judicial immunity.

=== April ===
- April 2 – The CBS soap opera Dallas is launched. It is set to be aired later this year in several countries, including the United Kingdom by the BBC.
- April 3 – The 50th Academy Awards ceremony, hosted by Bob Hope for the final time, is held at Dorothy Chandler Pavilion in Los Angeles. Woody Allen's Annie Hall wins Best Picture, with Allen winning Best Director. George Lucas' Star Wars wins six awards, while Fred Zinnemann's Julia and Herbert Ross' The Turning Point both receive eleven nominations each.
- April 7 – President Jimmy Carter decides to postpone production of the neutron bomb – a weapon which kills people with radiation but leaves buildings relatively intact.
- April 10 – The Volkswagen Westmoreland Assembly plant near New Stanton, Pennsylvania is dedicated, having begun production of the Rabbit, the North American version of the Volkswagen Golf, the previous week. Volkswagen thus becomes the second non-American automobile manufacturer (after Rolls-Royce in 1921–1931) to open a plant in the United States. (The plant closes in 1988.)
- April 18 – The U.S. Senate votes 68–32 to turn the Panama Canal over to Panamanian control on December 31, 1999.
- April 25 – St. Paul, Minnesota becomes the second U.S. city to repeal its gay rights ordinance after Anita Bryant's successful 1977 anti-gay campaign in Dade County, Florida.
- April 27 – Willow Island disaster – In the deadliest construction accident in United States history, 51 construction workers are killed when a cooling tower under construction collapses at the Pleasants Power Station in Willow Island, West Virginia.
- April 28 – WAC abolished; women integrated into regular Army.

=== May ===
- May 5 – Pete Rose of the Cincinnati Reds gets his 3,000th major league hit.
- May 20 – Mavis Hutchinson, 53, becomes the first woman to run across the U.S.; her trek took 69 days.
- May 25 – A bomb explodes in the security section of Northwestern University, wounding a security guard (the first Unabomber attack).
- May 26 – In Atlantic City, New Jersey, Resorts International, the first legal casino in the eastern United States, opens.
- May 28 – Indianapolis 500: Al Unser wins his third race, and the first for car owner Jim Hall.

=== June ===
- June 6 – California voters approve Proposition 13, which slashes property taxes nearly 60%.
- June 9 – The Church of Jesus Christ of Latter-day Saints extends the priesthood and temple blessings to "all worthy males", ending a general policy of excluding "Canaanites" from priesthood ordination and temple ordinances.
- June 10 – Affirmed becomes only the 11th horse to ever win the Triple Crown by defeating Alydar in the 110th running of the Belmont Stakes.
- June 12 – Serial killer David Berkowitz, the "Son of Sam," is sentenced to 365 years in prison.
- June 16 – The musical film Grease is released, starring 24-year-old New Jersey born actor John Travolta and 29-year-old British-Australian actress and singer Olivia Newton-John.
- June 19 – Garfield, which eventually becomes the world's most widely syndicated comic strip, makes its debut nationwide.
- June 25 – The rainbow flag of the LGBT movement flies for the first time (in its original form) at the San Francisco Gay Freedom Day Parade.
- June 28
  - The U.S. scientific satellite Seasat is launched.
  - University of California Regents v. Bakke: The Supreme Court of the United States bars quota systems in college admissions but affirms the constitutionality of programs which give advantages to minorities.
- June 29 – Actor Bob Crane is found bludgeoned to death in his Scottsdale, Arizona, apartment. The crime is never solved.

=== August ===
- August 2 – President Jimmy Carter declares an unprecedented state emergency and evacuation immediately following the revelation that Niagara Falls, New York neighborhood Love Canal was built on a toxic waste dump.
- August 12 – During a preseason game against the Oakland Raiders, New England Patriots wide receiver Darryl Stingley sustains a spinal cord injury on a hit from Jack Tatum, leaving Stingley a quadriplegic. He will die from complications of his injury on April 5, 2007.
- August 13 – The 5.8 M_{w} Santa Barbara earthquake affected the central coast of California with a maximum Mercalli intensity of VII (Very strong), causing 65 injuries and $12 million in financial losses.
- August 17 – Double Eagle II becomes the first balloon to successfully cross the Atlantic Ocean, flying from Presque Isle, Maine, to Miserey, France.
- August 18 – The first F-16 Fighting Falcon was delivered to the United States Air Force USAF

=== September ===
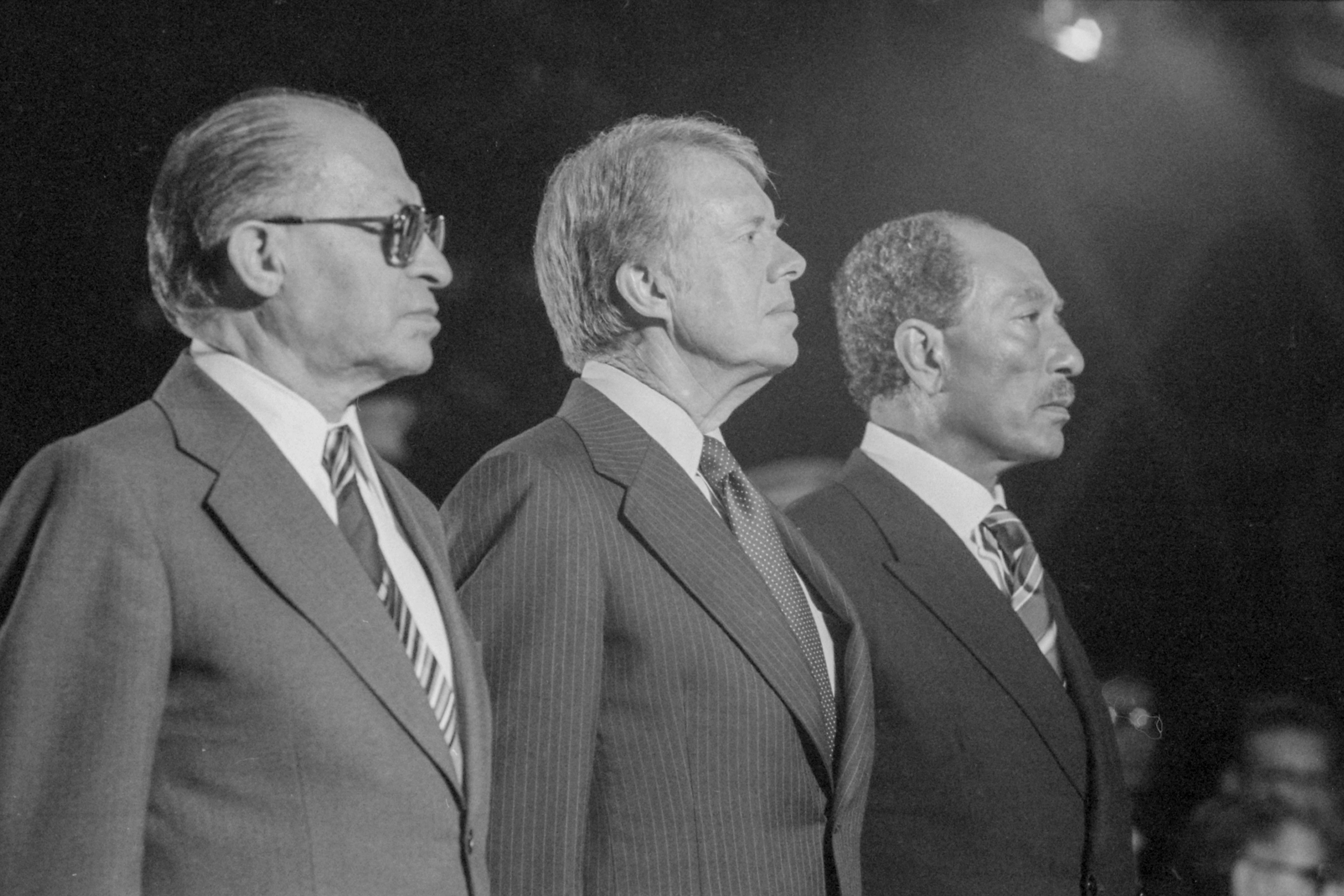
September 17: Camp David Accords

- September 17 – Camp David Accords: Menachem Begin and Anwar Sadat begin the peace process at Camp David, Maryland.
- September 18 – WKRP in Cincinnati premieres on CBS.
- September 25
  - PSA Flight 182, a Boeing 727, collides with a small private airplane and crashes in San Diego, California; 144 are killed.
  - Giuseppe Verdi's opera Otello makes its first appearance on Live from the Met, in a complete production of the opera starring Jon Vickers. This is the first complete television broadcast of the opera in the U.S. since the historic 1948 one.

=== October ===
- October 2 – The New York Yankees defeat the Boston Red Sox 5–4 at Fenway Park to clinch the AL East after being 14 games out of first place only two months earlier. The Yankees would eventually go on to defeat the Kansas City Royals and Los Angeles Dodgers and win the World Series.
- October 4 – Pier 39 opens on Fisherman's Wharf, San Francisco, as a tourist attraction.
- October 10 – President Jimmy Carter signs a bill that authorizes the minting of the Susan B. Anthony dollar.
- October 14 – President Jimmy Carter signs a bill into law which allows homebrewing of beer in the United States.
- October 17 – The New York Yankees clinch their 22nd World Series championship, defeating the Dodgers 7–2 in Los Angeles and winning the Series 4 games to 2.
- October 25 – John Carpenter's low-budget slasher film, Halloween, starring Jamie Lee Curtis and Donald Pleasence, is released.
- October 27 – President Jimmy Carter signs the Humphrey–Hawkins Full Employment Act, adjusting the government's economic goals to include full employment, growth in production, price stability, and balance of trade and budget.

=== November ===
- November 7 – California voters defeat the Briggs Initiative that would have prohibited gay school teachers.
- November 10 – Theodore Roosevelt and Badlands National Park is established.
- November 17 – The Star Wars Holiday Special airs on CBS; this is its first and only airing.
- November 18 – Mass murder/suicide of 909 Americans in Jonestown, Guyana under the direction of Jim Jones.
- November 19 – The first U.S. Take Back the Night march occurs in San Francisco.
- November 16 – A Fire occurs at a Holiday Inn in Greece, New York, leaving 10 people dead
- November 27 – In San Francisco, California, Mayor George Moscone and City Supervisor Harvey Milk are assassinated by former Supervisor Dan White.

=== December ===
- December 3 – The Southern Crescent passenger train derails at Shipman, Virginia, killing six and injuring 60.
- December 4 – Dianne Feinstein succeeds the murdered George Moscone as San Francisco, California's first woman mayor (she serves until January 8, 1988).
- December 11 – Lufthansa heist: Six men rob a Lufthansa cargo facility in New York City's Kennedy airport.
- December 13 – The first Susan B. Anthony dollar enters circulation.
- December 15
  - Cleveland, Ohio becomes the first major American city to go into default since the Great Depression, under Mayor Dennis Kucinich.
  - Superman is released in theaters in the United States.
- December 22 – Chicago serial killer John Wayne Gacy, who is subsequently convicted of the murder of 33 young men, is arrested.
- December 28 – United Airlines Flight 173 during a flight leg from Denver, Colorado, to Portland, Oregon, makes a forced emergency landing in a suburban neighborhood in Portland after running out of fuel, killing 10 of 189 people on board.

=== Full date unknown ===
- Ford initiates a recall for the Pinto because of a public outcry resulting from deaths associated with gas tank explosions.
- The New York International Bible Society's New International Version of the complete Bible translated into modern American English is published.

=== Ongoing ===
- Cold War (1947–1991)
- Détente (c. 1969–1979)
- 1970s energy crisis (1973–1980)

== Births ==
=== January ===
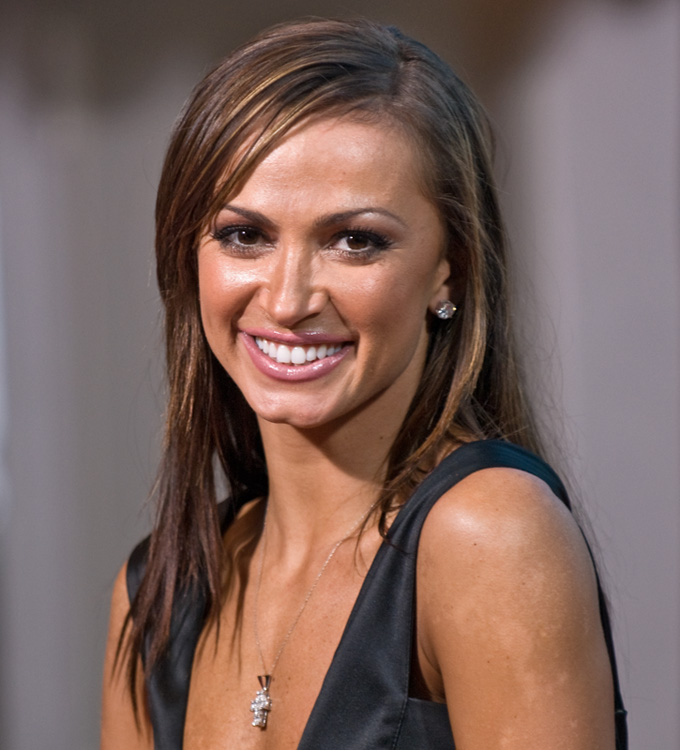
Karina Smirnoff

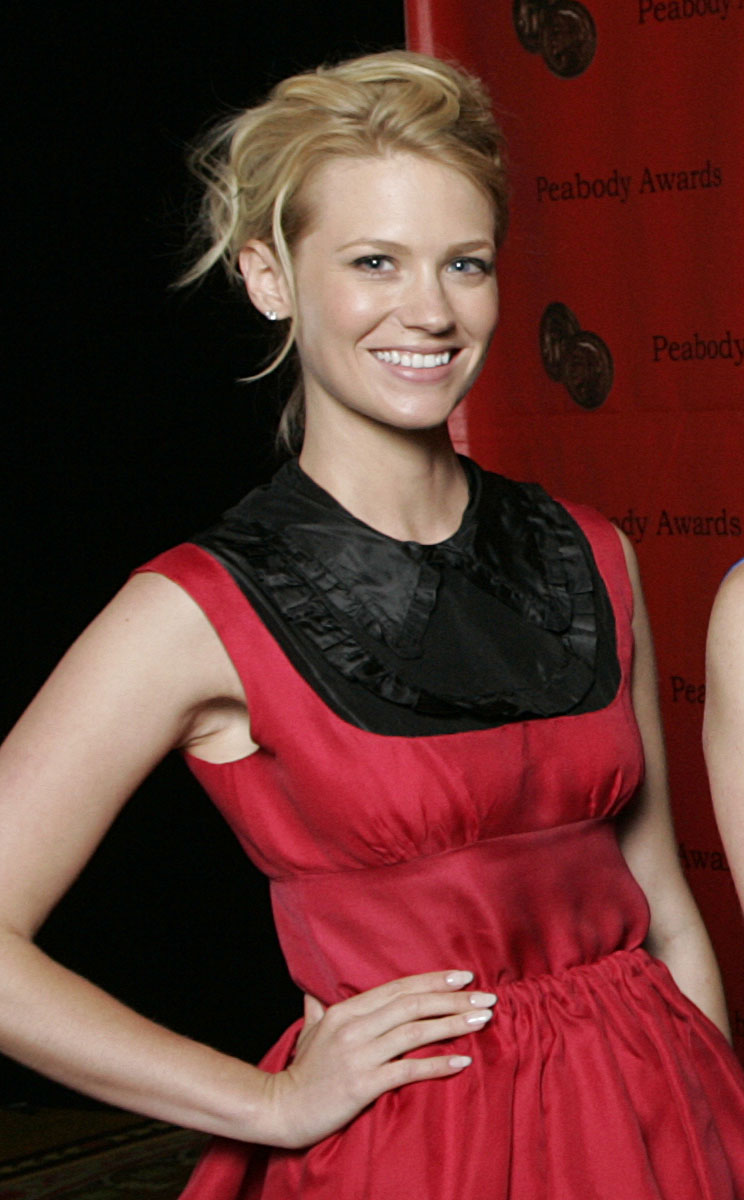
January Jones

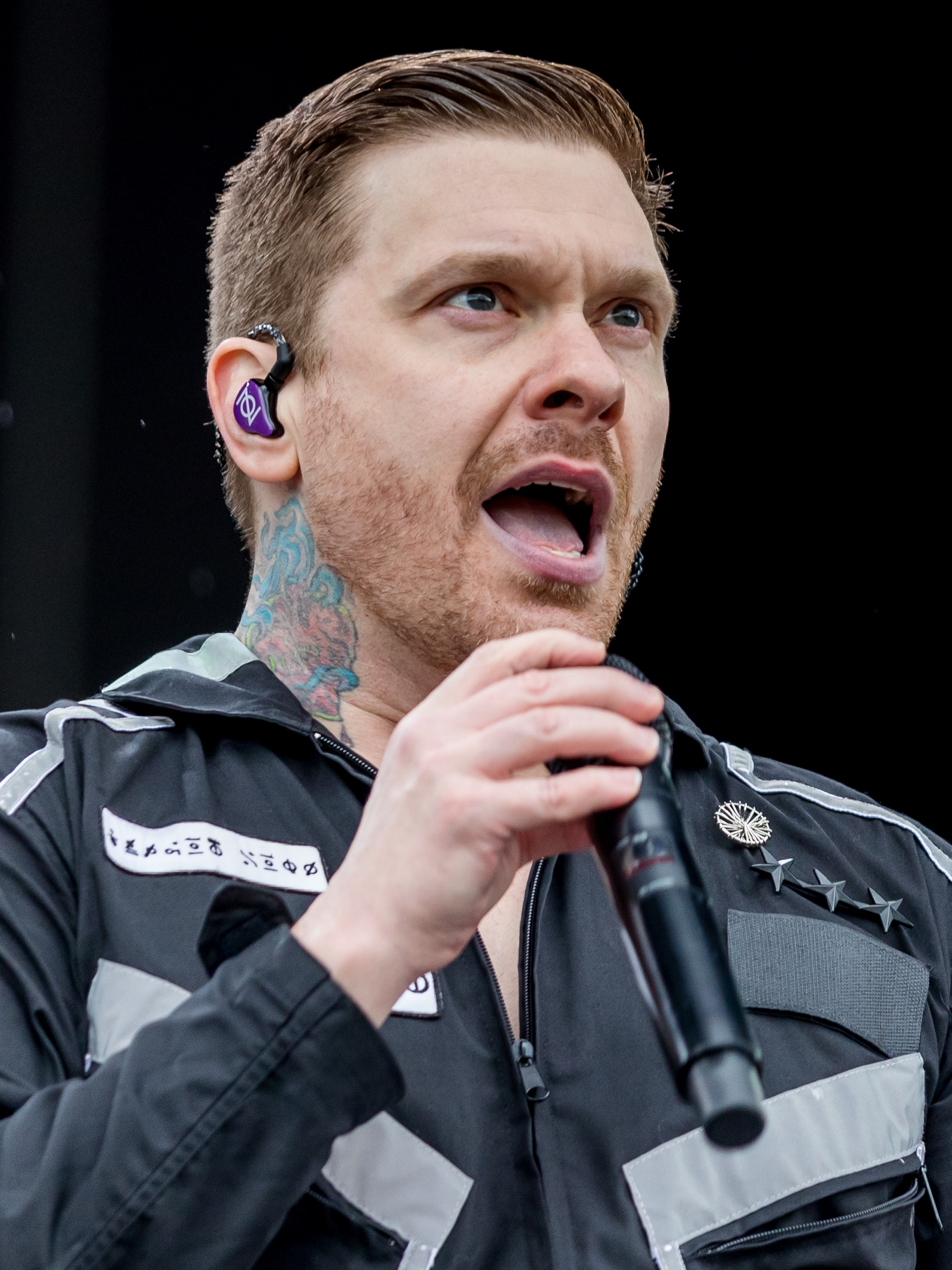
Brent Smith

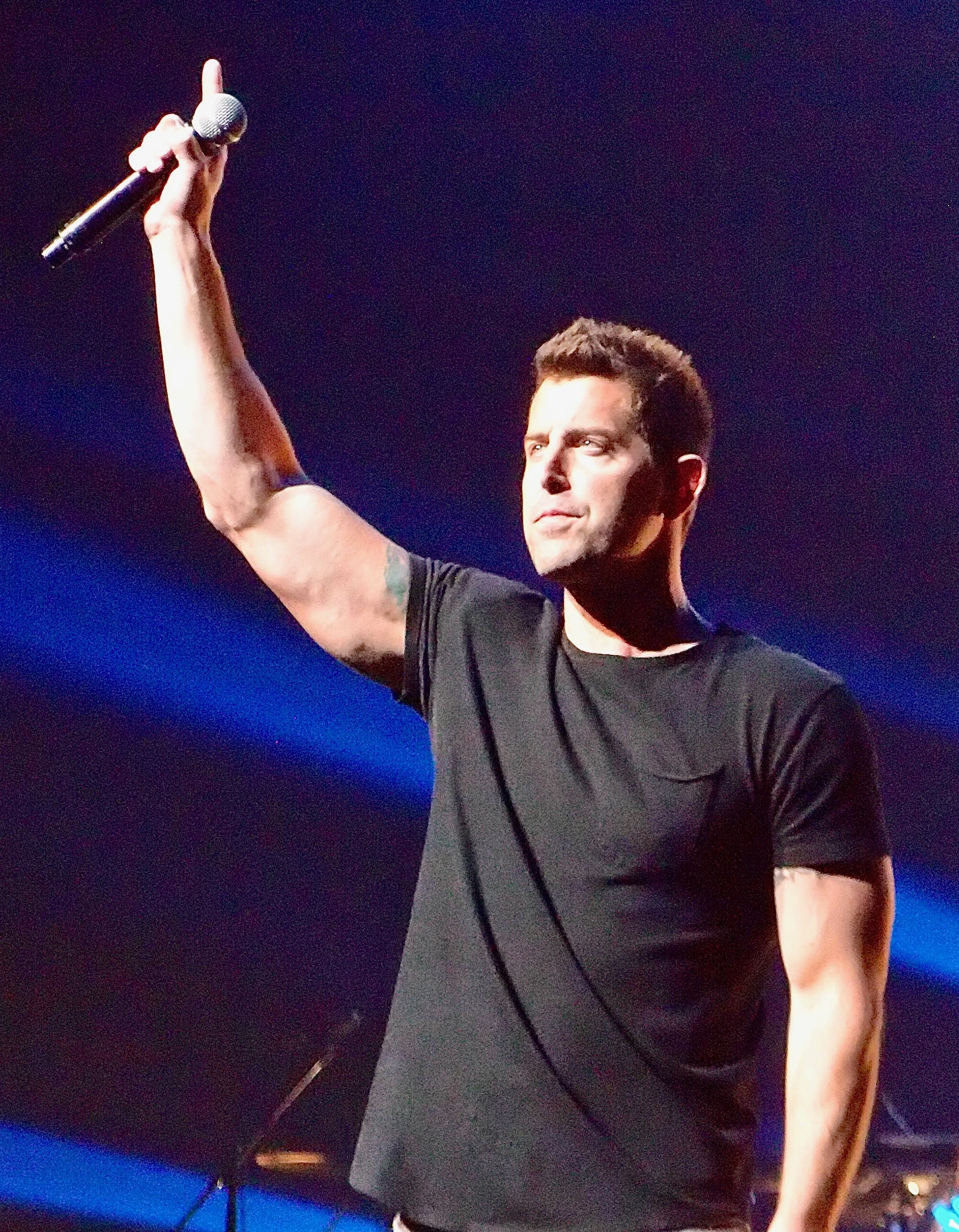
Jeremy Camp

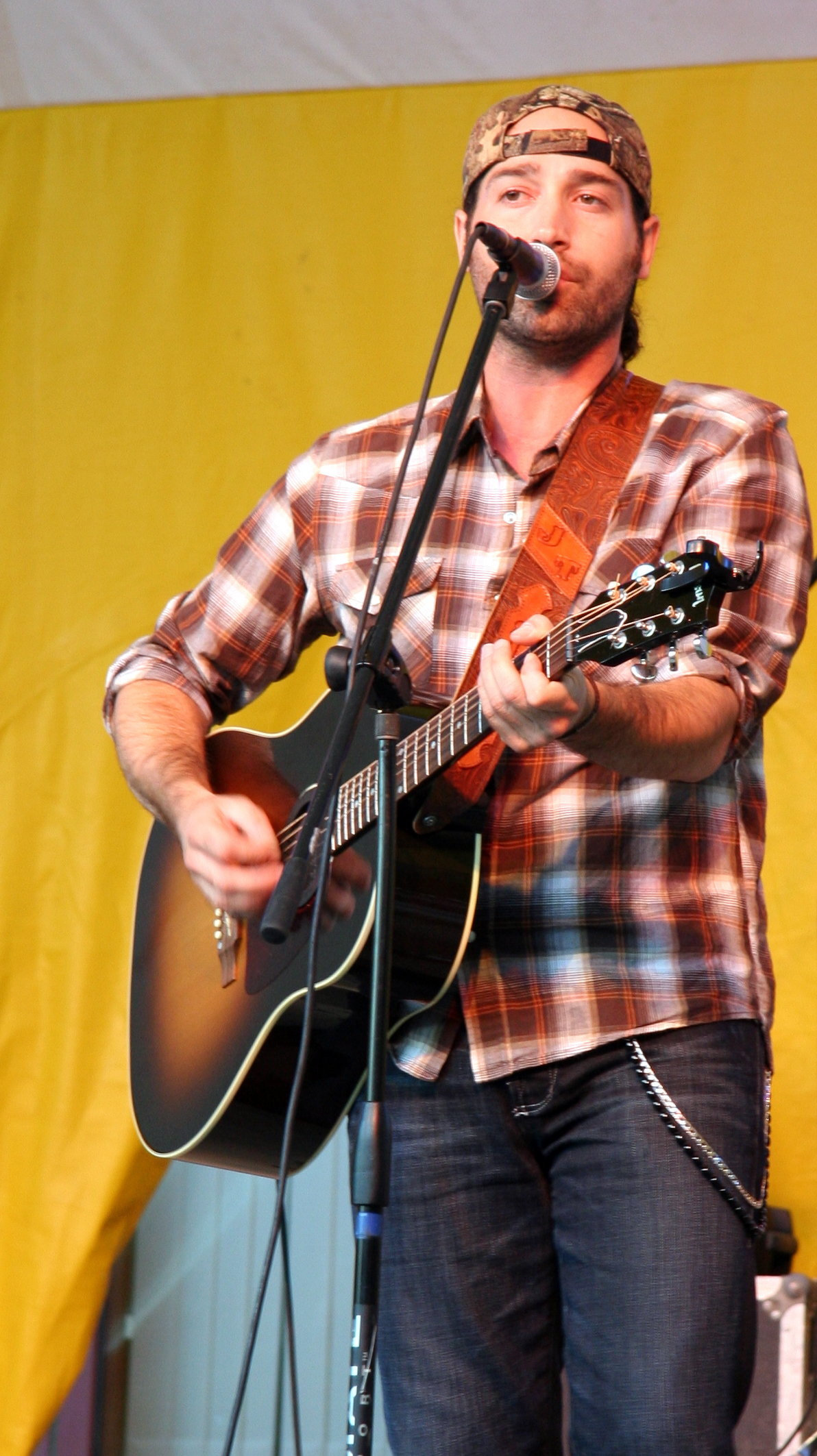
Josh Thompson

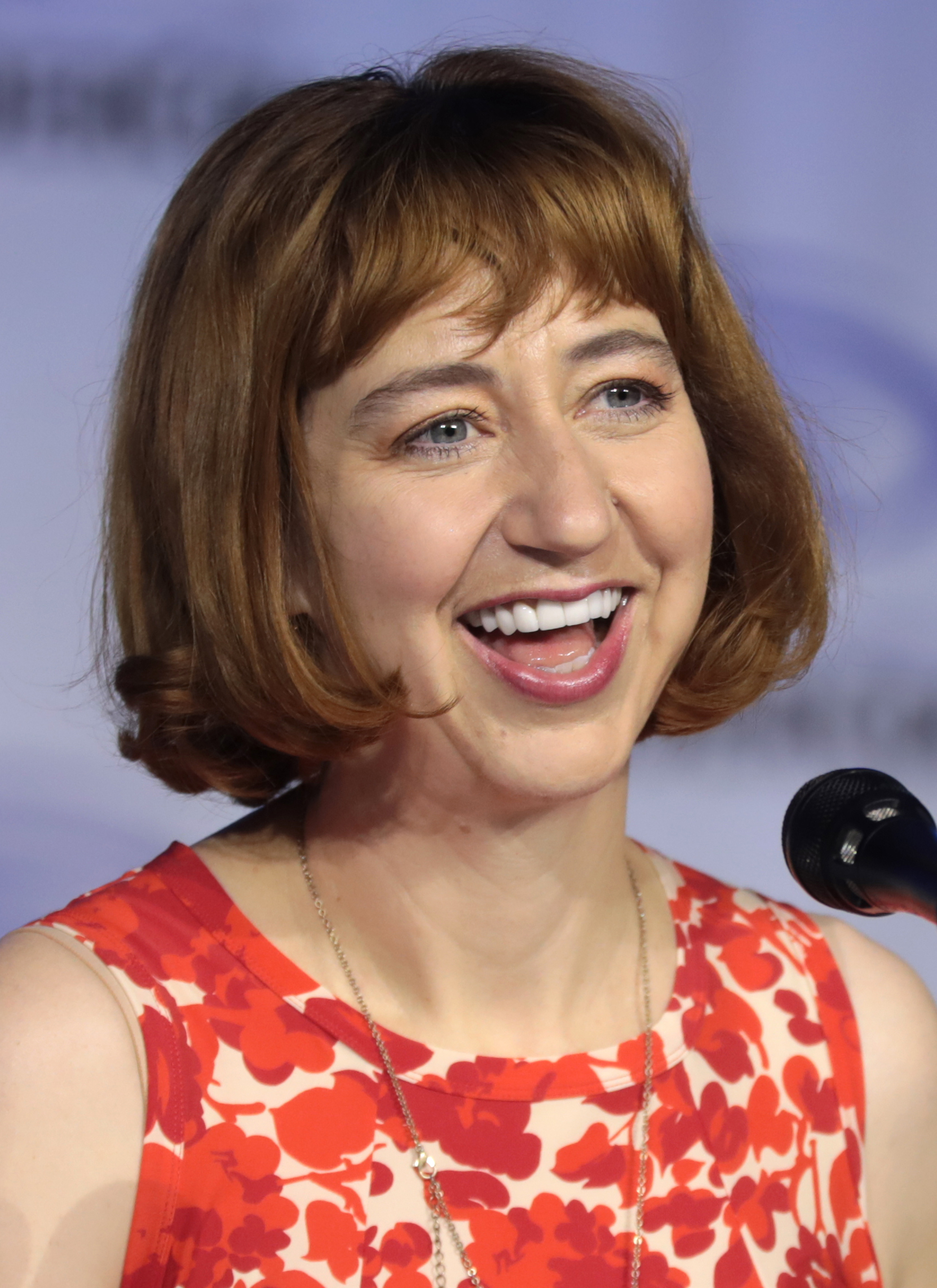
Kristen Schaal

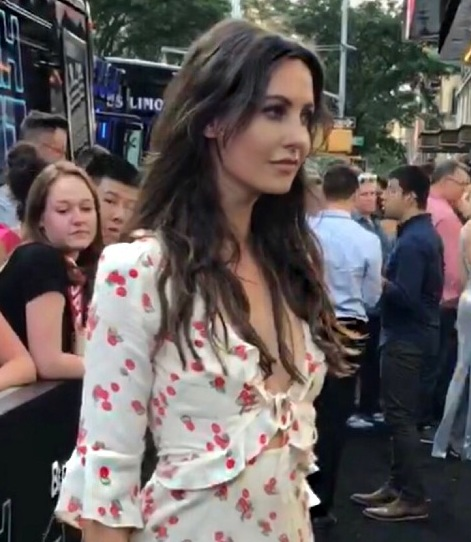
Liz Carey

- January 2 – Karina Smirnoff, Ukrainian-born dancer
- January 3
  - Kimberley Locke, singer
  - Shawnna, rapper
- January 5
  - America Olivo, actress
  - January Jones, actress
- January 6
  - Casey Fossum, baseball player
  - Bubba Franks, football player
- January 7
  - Israel Keyes, convicted serial killer (d. 2012)
  - Kevin Mench, baseball player
- January 9
  - Chad Johnson, football player and actor
  - AJ McLean, pop singer/songwriter and member of the Backstreet Boys
- January 10
  - Bang Belushi, rapper
  - Niya Butts, basketball player and coach
  - Brent Smith, singer and frontman for Shinedown
  - Tamina Snuka, wrestler and actress
- January 11
  - Lazare Adingono, Cameroonian-born basketball player and coach
  - Mark Aylor, rugby player
- January 12
  - Stephen Abas, wrestler and mixed martial artist
  - Jeremy Camp, Christian singer/songwriter
- January 13
  - Aaron Boone, football player
  - Nate Silver, statistician, psephologist, and writer
  - Michael H. Weber, screenwriter and producer
- January 14
  - Eddie Berlin, football player
  - Shawn Crawford, Olympic sprinter
- January 15 – Eddie Cahill, actor
- January 18
  - J Anthony Allen, composer and producer
  - Daniel Alvarez, soccer player
- January 19
  - Amanda Augustus, tennis player
  - Matt Brass, politician
- January 20 – Joy Giovanni, wrestler, model, and actress
- January 21
  - Chris Brown, football player
  - Phil Stacey, singer and American Idol contestant
- January 23
  - Stephanie Arnold, Olympic archer
  - Jason Bishop, illusionist and magician
  - E. Kidd Bogart, songwriter, music publisher, and record executive
  - Josh Thompson, country singer
- January 24 – Kristen Schaal, actress, comedian, and writer
- January 25
  - Jenny Benson, soccer player
  - Ben Brown, blogger
  - Liz Carey, actress, comedian, personality, podcaster, and writer
  - B. J. Whitmer, wrestler
- January 26
  - Jake Arians, football player
  - Kelly Stables, actress
- January 27
  - Aaron Best, football player and coach
  - Jonathan Byrd, golfer
- January 28 – Big Freedia, musician
- January 29
  - Rob Bironas, football player (d. 2014)
  - Arūnas Bižokas, Lithuanian-born ballroom dancer
  - Brian Windhorst, basketball journalist
- January 30 – Donald Barrett, drummer
- January 31
  - Brad Rutter, game show champion (Jeopardy!)
  - Sean Smith, diplomat (d. 2012)

=== February ===
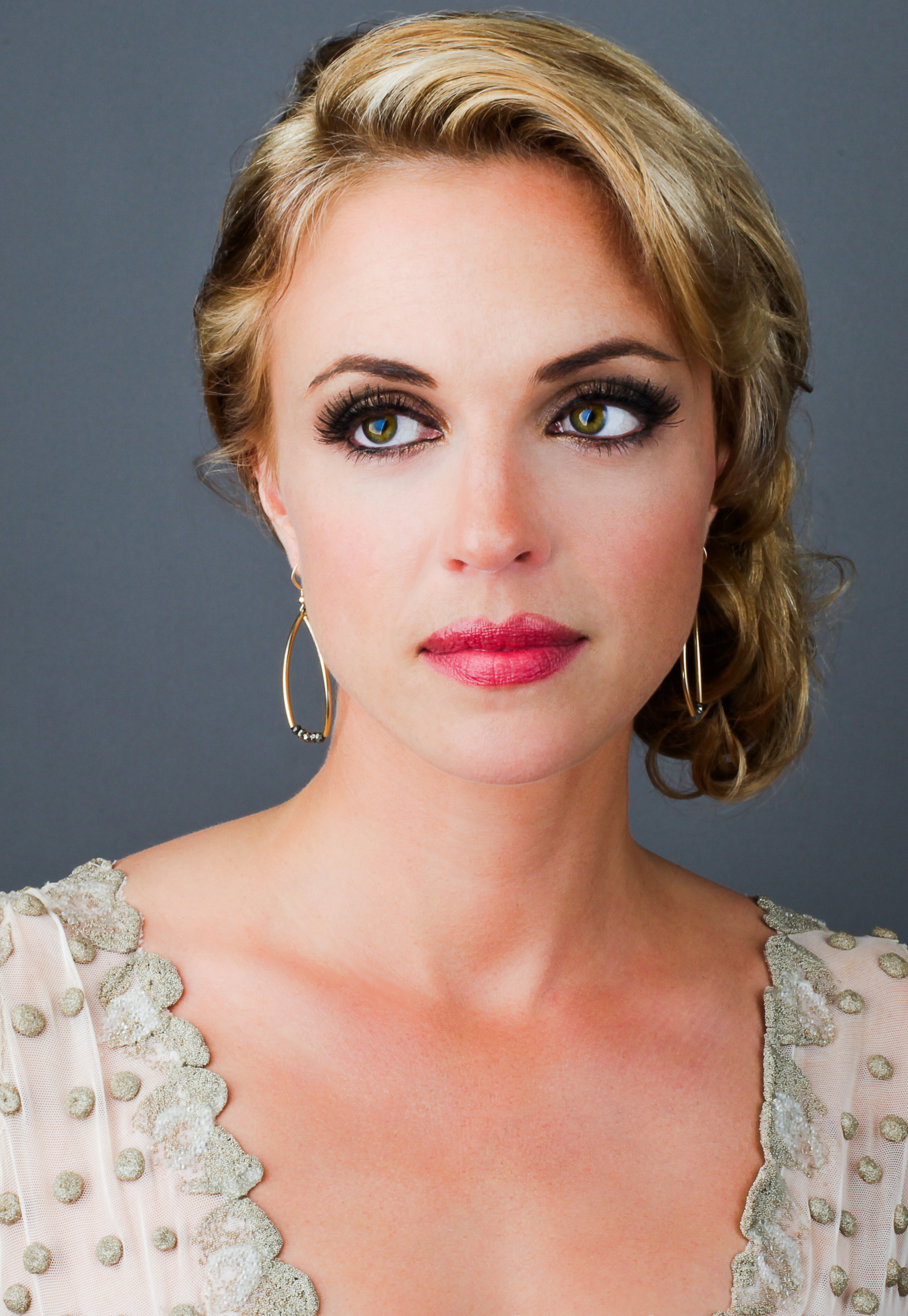
Kelly Sullivan

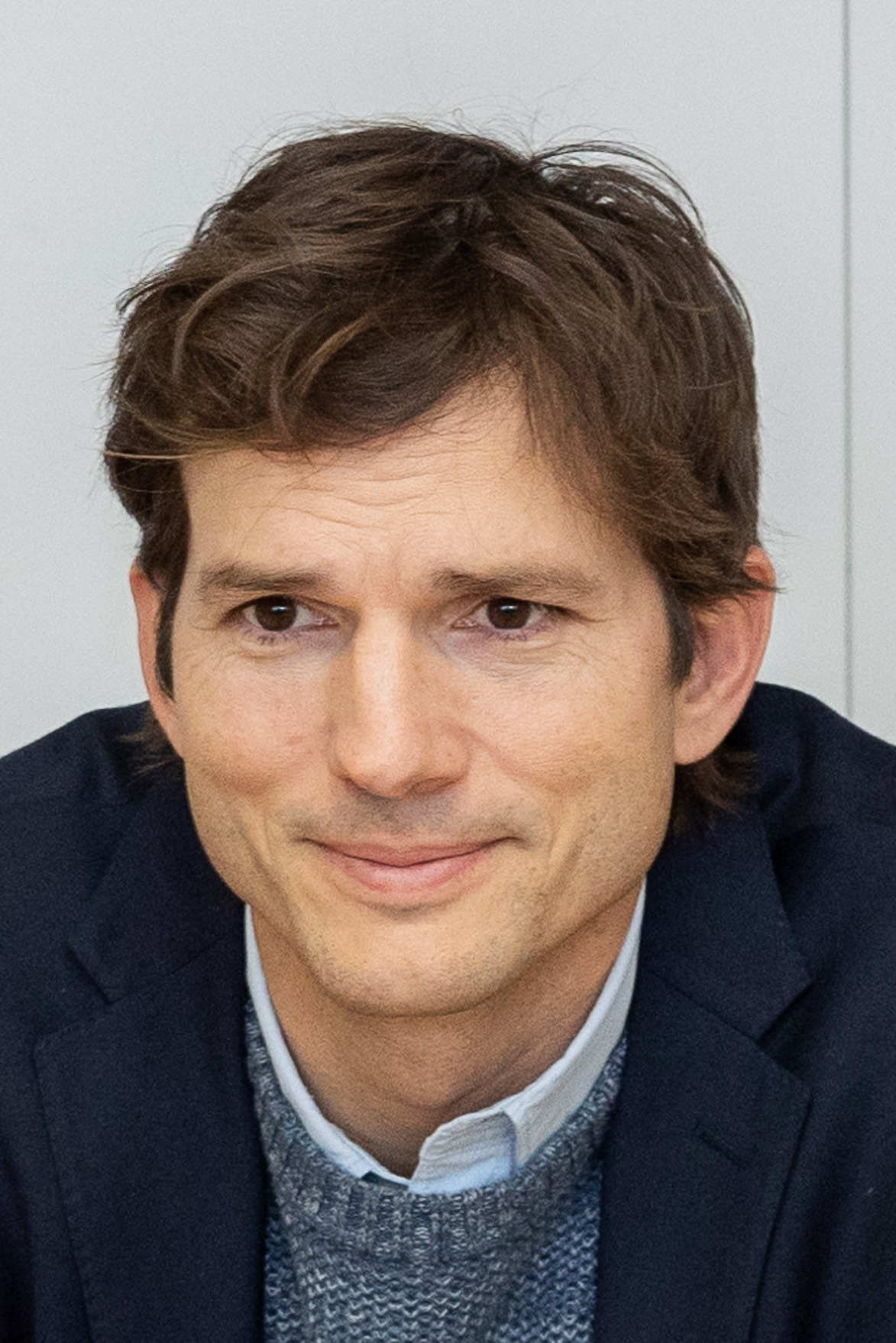
Ashton Kutcher

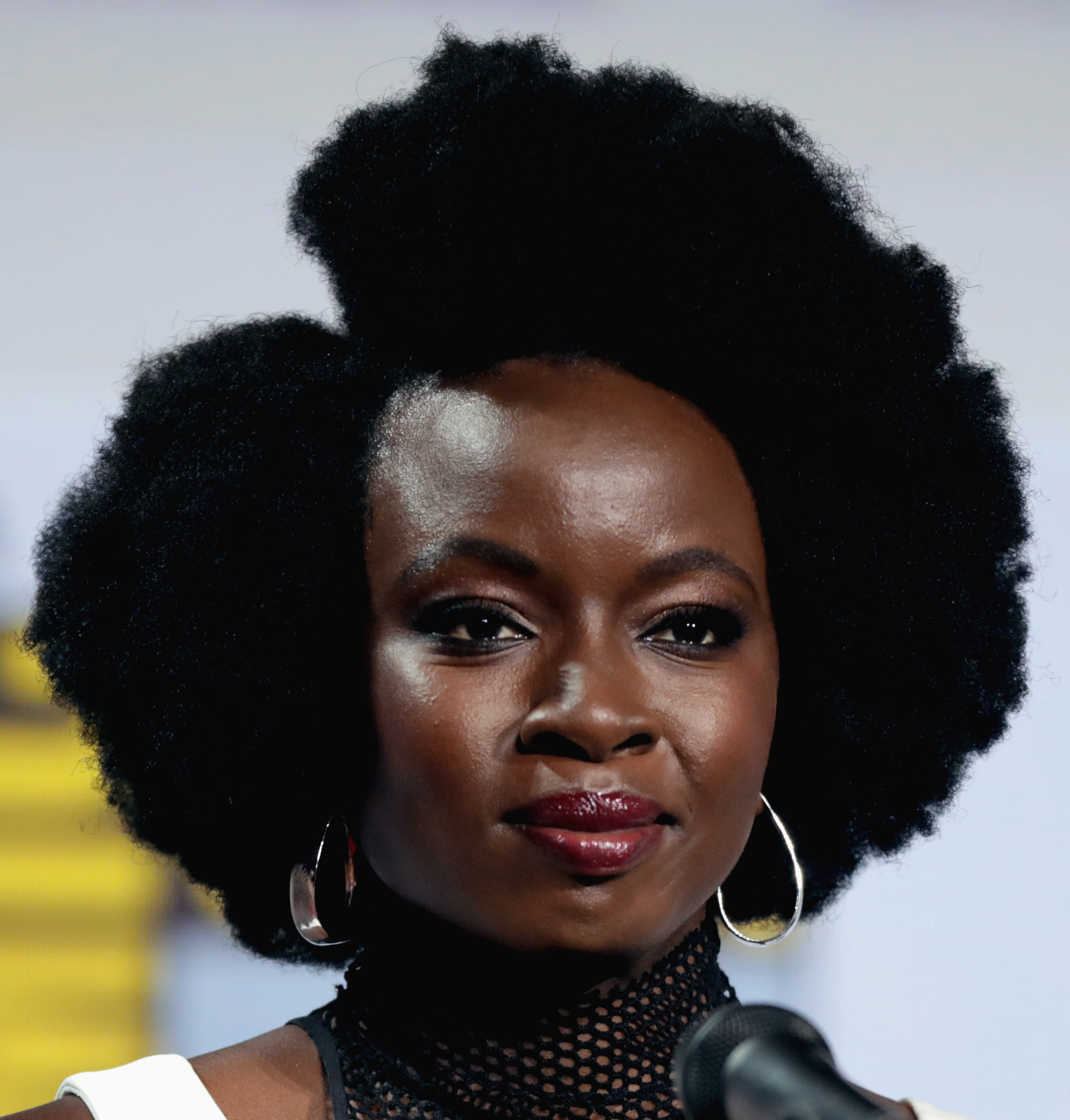
Danai Gurira

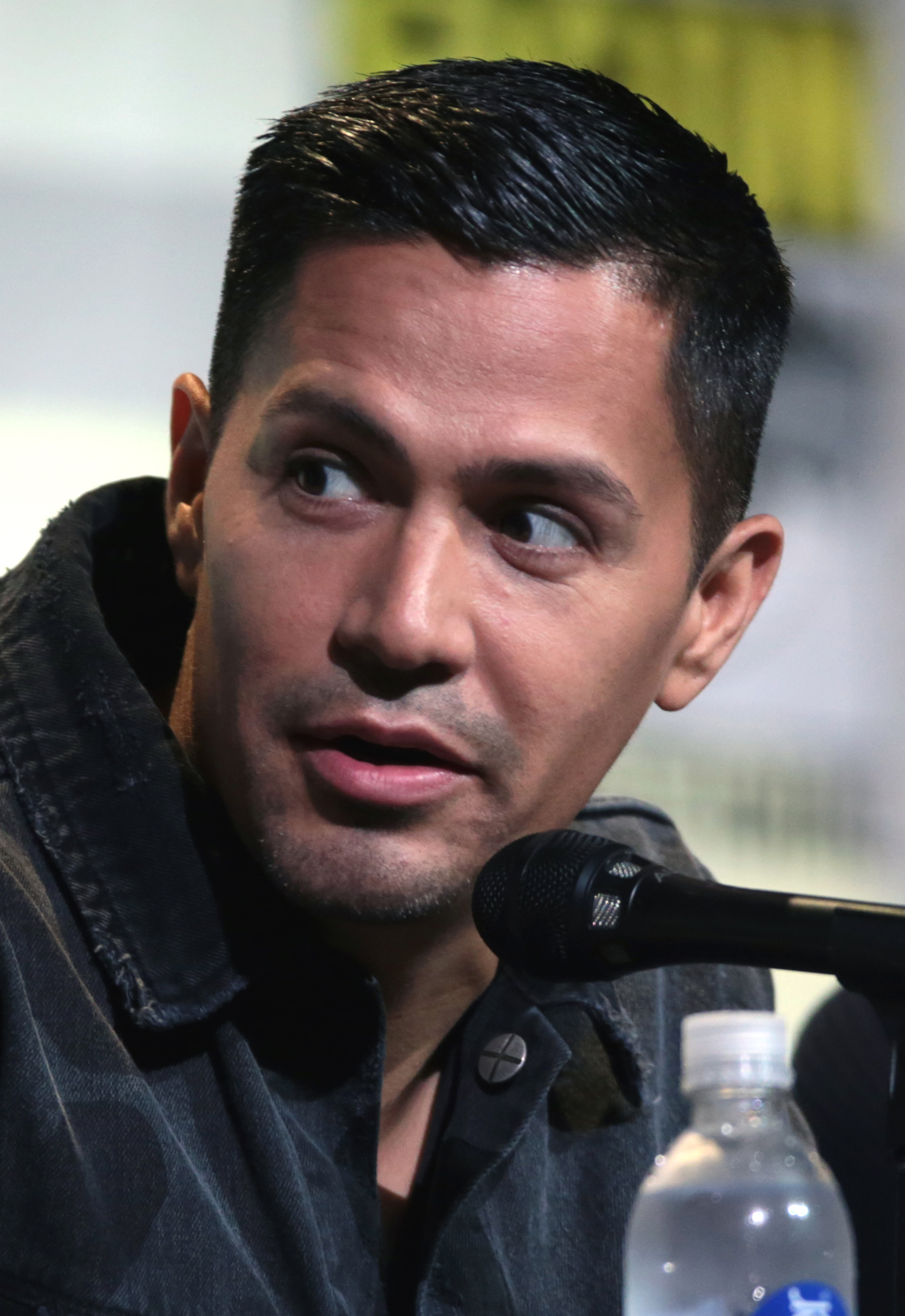
Jay Hernandez

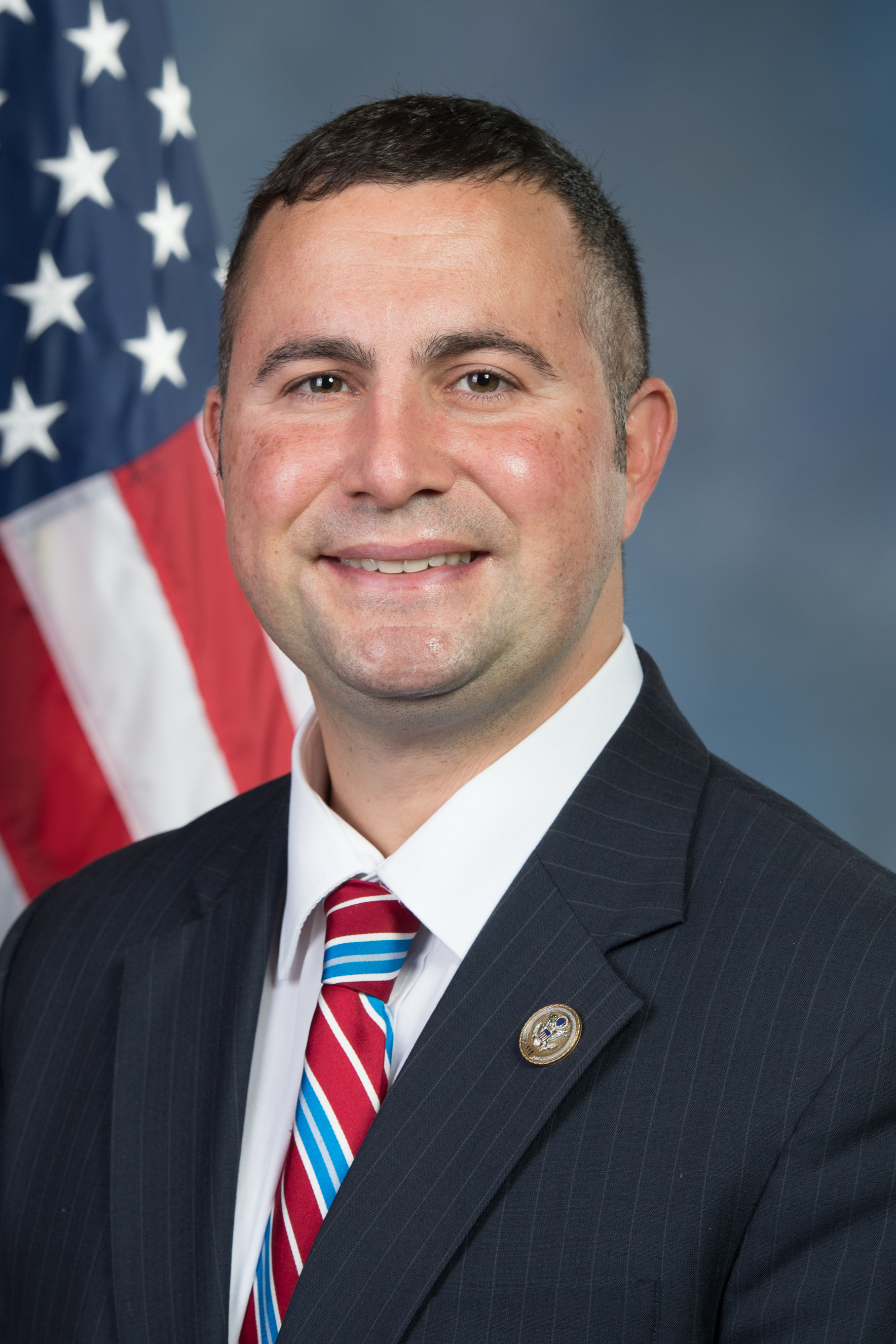
Darren Soto

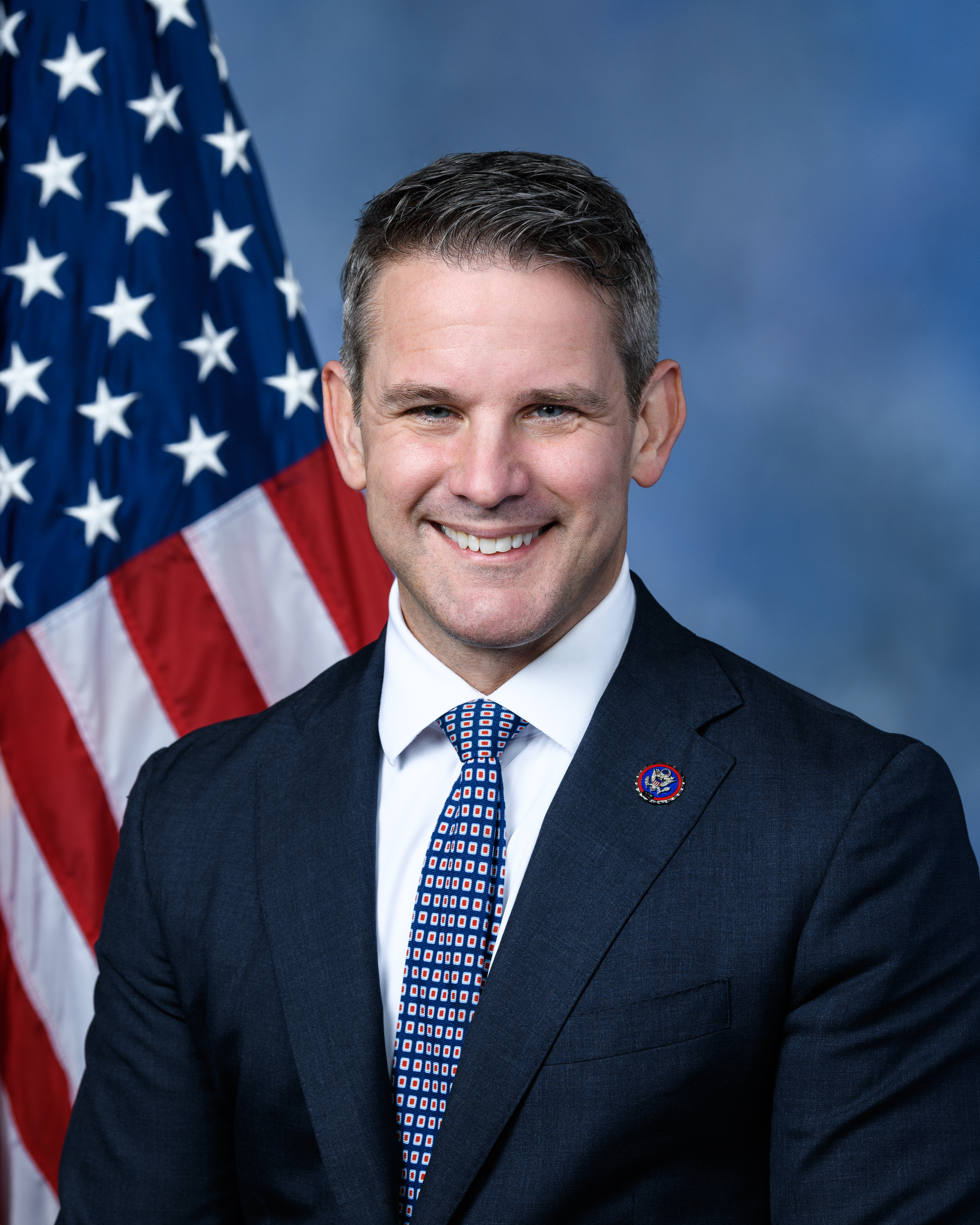
Adam Kinzinger

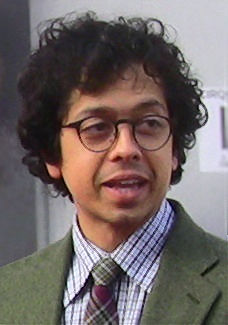
Geoffrey Arend

- February 1 – Dusty Bergman, baseball player
- February 2
  - Eden Espinosa, actress and singer
  - Chris 'Romanski' Romano, actor, writer, producer, and director
  - Rich Sommer, actor
- February 3
  - Rashon Burno, basketball player and coach
  - Arvie Lowe Jr., actor
  - Eliza Schneider, actress
  - Kelly Sullivan, actress
- February 5
  - Ikaika Anderson, politician
  - Nick Allen Brown, author
  - Brian Russell, football player
- February 7
  - Tom Blankenship, bassist for My Morning Jacket
  - Ashton Kutcher, screen actor and venture capitalist
- February 8 – Donald Betts, politician
- February 9
  - David Allen, football player
  - Clarice Assad, Brazilian-born composer, pianist, arranger, singer, and educator
- February 10
  - Nick Basile, director, producer, actor, and screenwriter
  - David Berry, entrepreneur and business executive
  - Cedrick Bowers, baseball player
  - Reshea Bristol, basketball player
- February 11
  - Andrew Bayes, football player
  - Laurel Braitman, science historian and writer
  - Brent Butler, baseball player
- February 12
  - Brian Chase, drummer for Yeah Yeah Yeahs
  - Busdriver, rapper
- February 13 – Mike Brown, football player
- February 14
  - Courtney Brown, football player
  - Patrick J. Bumatay, judge
  - Danai Gurira, actress and playwright
  - Richard Hamilton, basketball player
- February 16
  - Bassnectar, DJ and record producer
  - John Tartaglia, actor
- February 17 – Jacob Wetterling, kidnapping victim (d. 1989)
- February 18 – Winny Brodt-Brown, ice hockey player
- February 19
  - Antimc, hip hop producer
  - Matt Bettinelli-Olpin, director, writer, actor, and musician
  - Immortal Technique, Peruvian-born rapper
  - Kenyatta Wright, football player
- February 20
  - Lauren Ambrose, actress and producer
  - Jay Hernandez, actor and fashion model
- February 21
  - Erick Barkley, basketball player
  - Kumail Nanjiani, Pakistani-born actor and comedian
  - Nicole Parker, actress, comedian, writer, podcaster, and singer
- February 22
  - Dhani Jones, football player
  - Gus Sorola, actor and podcast host
- February 24
  - Corey Benjamin, basketball player
  - John Nolan, singer-songwriter, guitarist, and vocalist for Taking Back Sunday
  - T. W. Shannon, politician
  - DeWayne Wise, baseball player
- February 25
  - Big Ali, rapper and songwriter
  - Darren Soto, politician
- February 26 – Molly Antopol, fiction and nonfiction writer
- February 27
  - James Briggs, keyboardist for The Aquabats
  - Adam Kinzinger, politician
- February 28 – Geoffrey Arend, actor

=== March ===
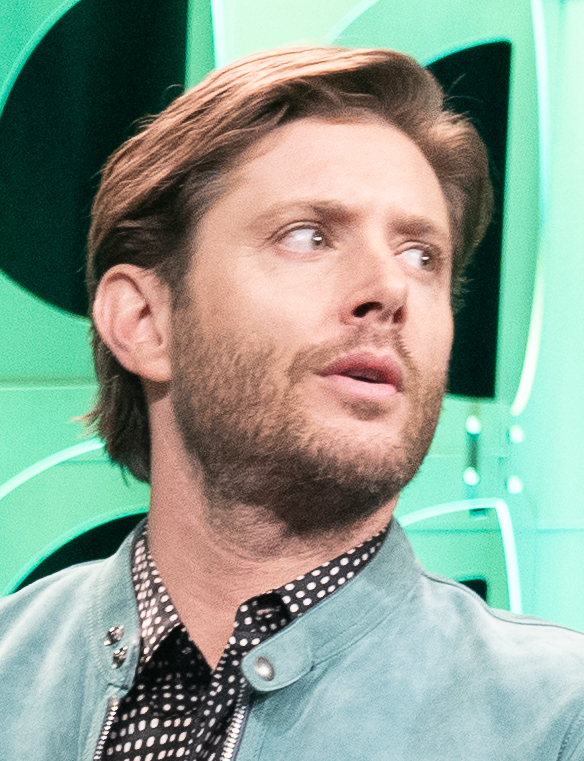
Jensen Ackles

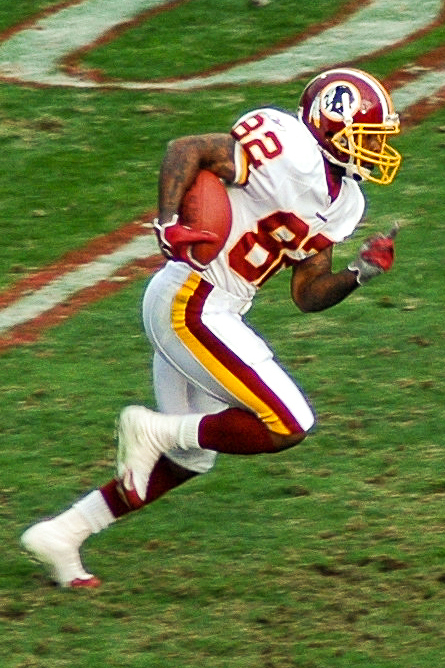
Antonio Brown

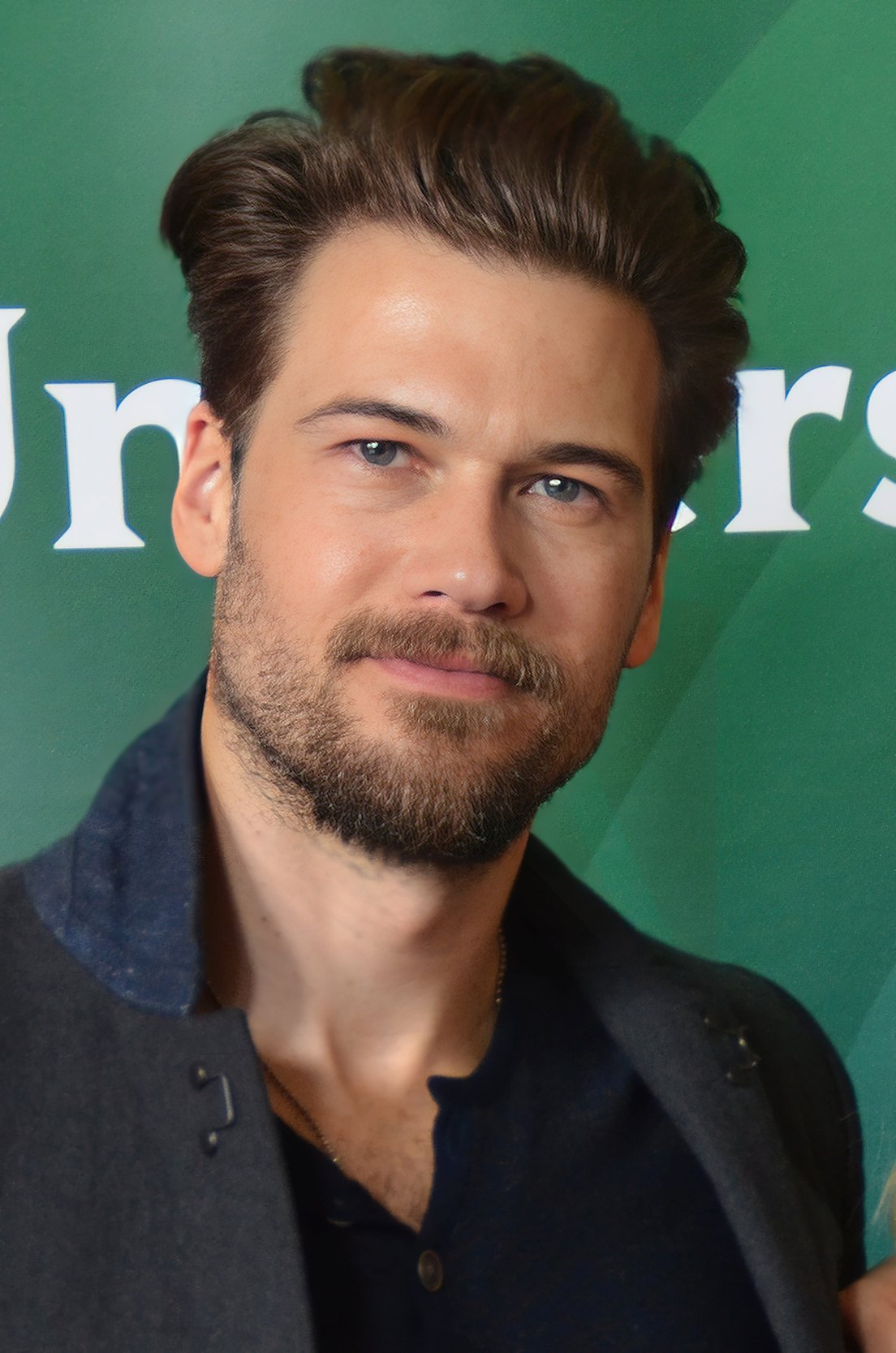
Nick Zano

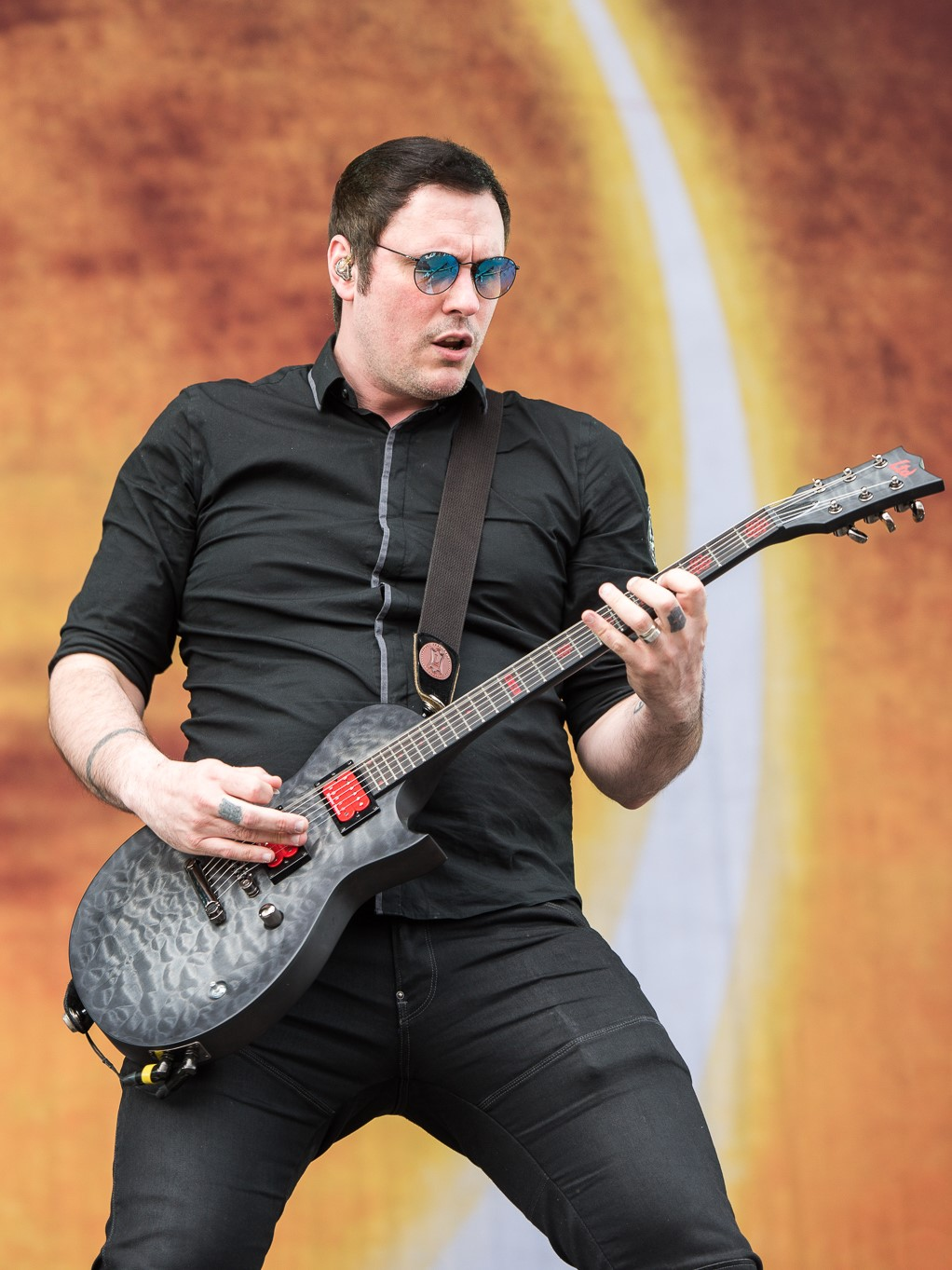
Benjamin Burnley

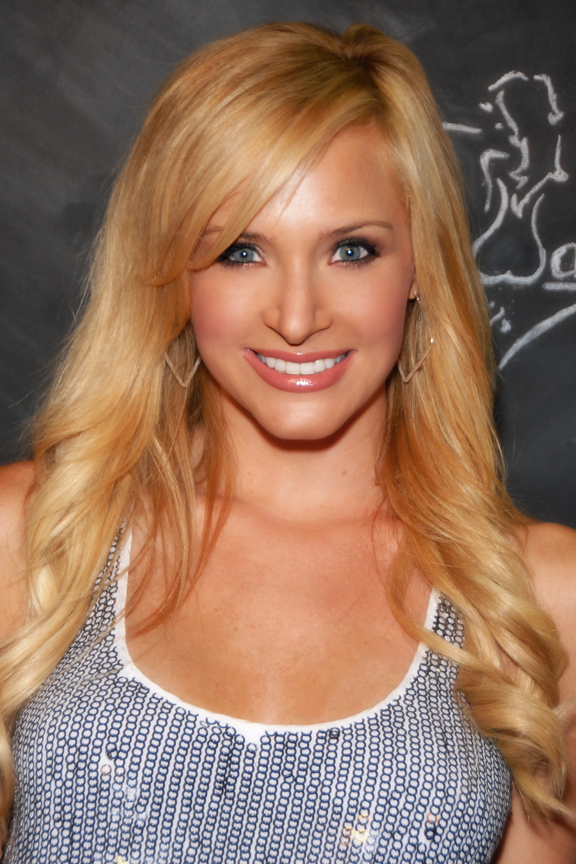
Camille Anderson

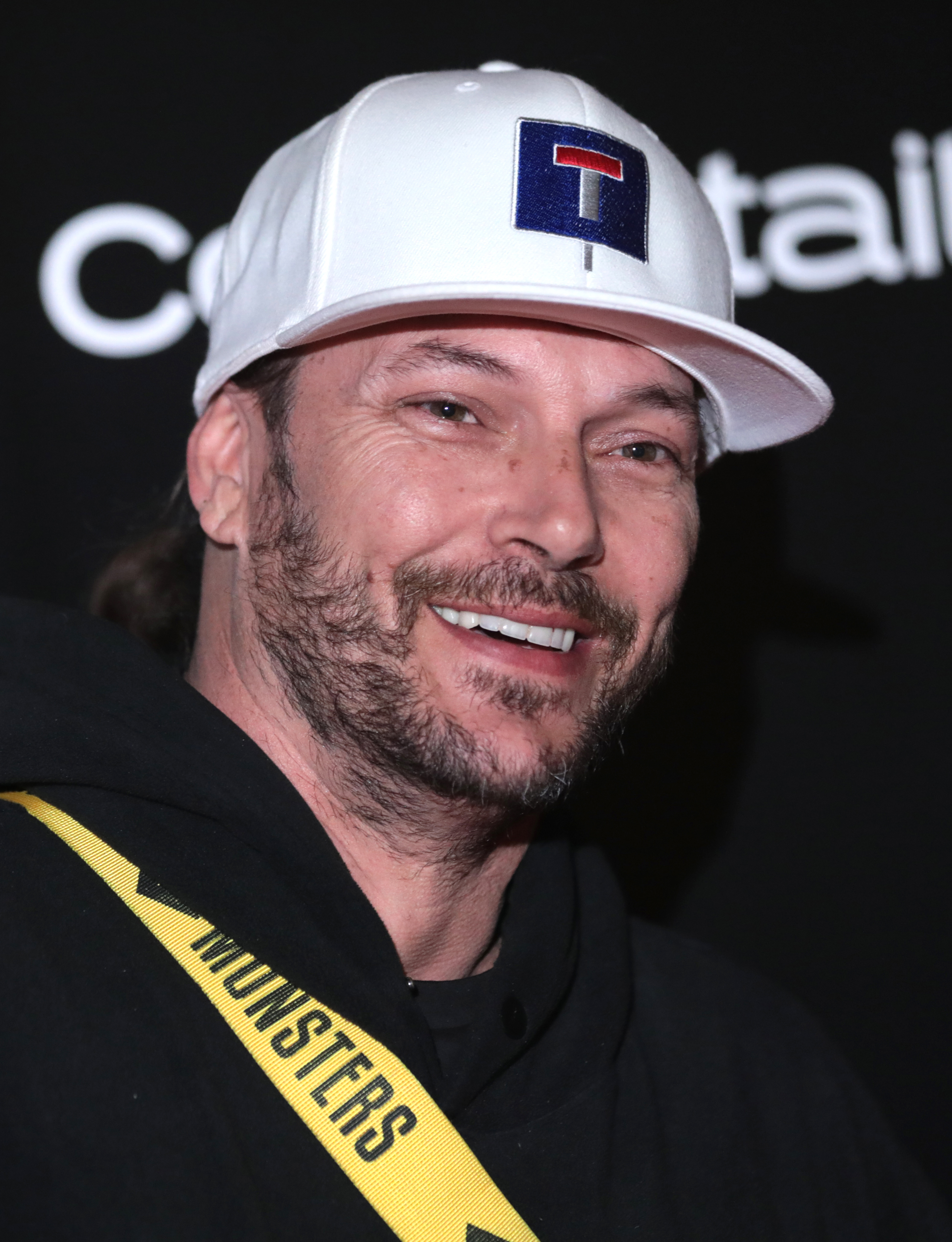
Kevin Federline

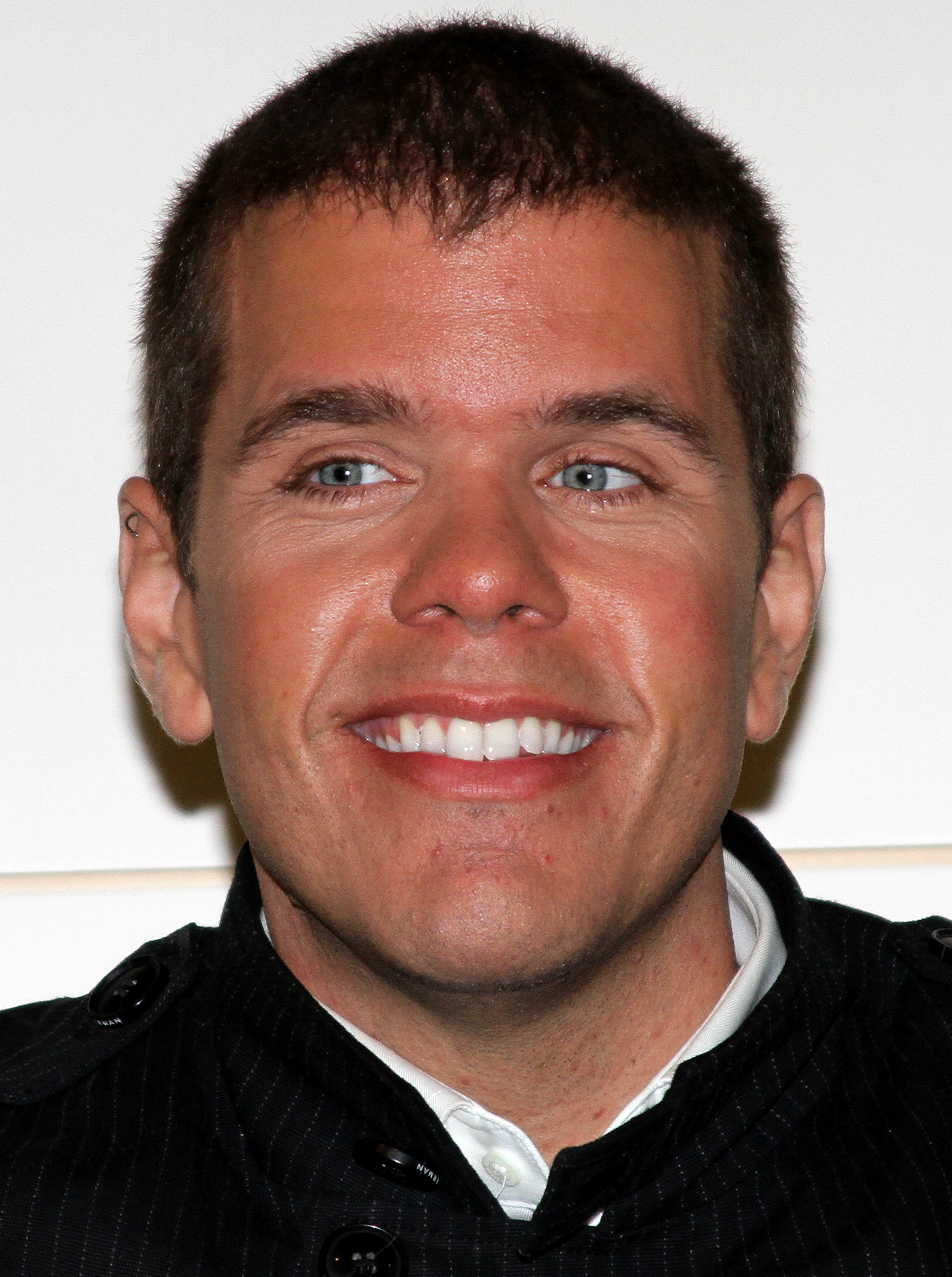
Perez Hilton

- March 1
  - Jensen Ackles, actor
  - Joe Block, radio and television announcer
  - Mya Byrne, singer/songwriter
  - Donovan Patton, actor, television host, and singer
- March 2
  - Sebastian Janikowski, football player
  - Mike Naig, politician
- March 3
  - Yeremiah Bell, football player
  - Antonio Brown, football player
  - Matt Diaz, baseball player
- March 4 – Nate Ackerman, British-born mathematician and wrestler
- March 6
  - Mike Jackson, politician
  - Sage Rosenfels, football player
- March 7 – Mike Reese, politician (d. 2021)
- March 8 – Nick Zano, actor
- March 9
  - Nathan Beard, politician
  - LaKeysia Beene, soccer player
  - MickDeth, bassist and guitarist (d. 2013)
- March 10 – Benjamin Burnley, singer and frontman for Breaking Benjamin
- March 12
  - Camille Anderson, actress, model, and television host
  - Neal Obermeyer, editorial cartoonist
  - Claudio Sanchez, alternative rock musician and writer for Coheed & Cambria
- March 13
  - Ben Allen, politician
  - Jason Bergmann, strongman competitor
  - Tom Danielson, cyclist
  - Kenny Watson, football player
- March 14 – Anna Astvatsaturian Turcotte, Azerbaijani-born writer, lecturer, philanthropist, and activist
- March 15 – Marshal Dutton, singer/songwriter, guitarist, and frontman for Hinder
- March 16
  - Ed Ableser, politician
  - Jake Bailey, make-up artist and photographer (d. 2015)
  - Brooke Burns, fashion model and actress
  - Matthew Montgomery, actor
  - Matt Pryor, singer/songwriter, guitarist, and frontman for The Get Up Kids
- March 17
  - Dan Alexander, football player
  - Jason Baker, football player
  - Patrick Seitz, voice actor
- March 18
  - Antonio Margarito, Mexican-born boxer
  - Freddie Eugene Owens, convicted murderer (d. 2024)
- March 19 – Jason Barrett, politician
- March 20
  - Mike Bynum, baseball player
  - Mark Alan Lee, Navy SEAL (d. 2006)
- March 21
  - Jeff Bajenaru, baseball player
  - La Chat, rapper
  - Kevin Federline, dancer, rapper, actor, model, wrestler, and DJ
- March 22 – Josh Heupel, football player
- March 23
  - Nicholle Tom, actress
  - Perez Hilton, actor and blogger
  - Ryan Grim, author and journalist
- March 24 – Amir Arison, actor
- March 27 – Dee Brown, baseball player
- March 28 – Case Brittain, attorney and politician
- March 29
  - Eric Bruntlett, baseball player
  - Taylor Marshall, YouTuber, priest, and academic
- March 30 – Josh Bard, baseball player
- March 31 – Sonia Chang-Díaz, politician

=== April ===
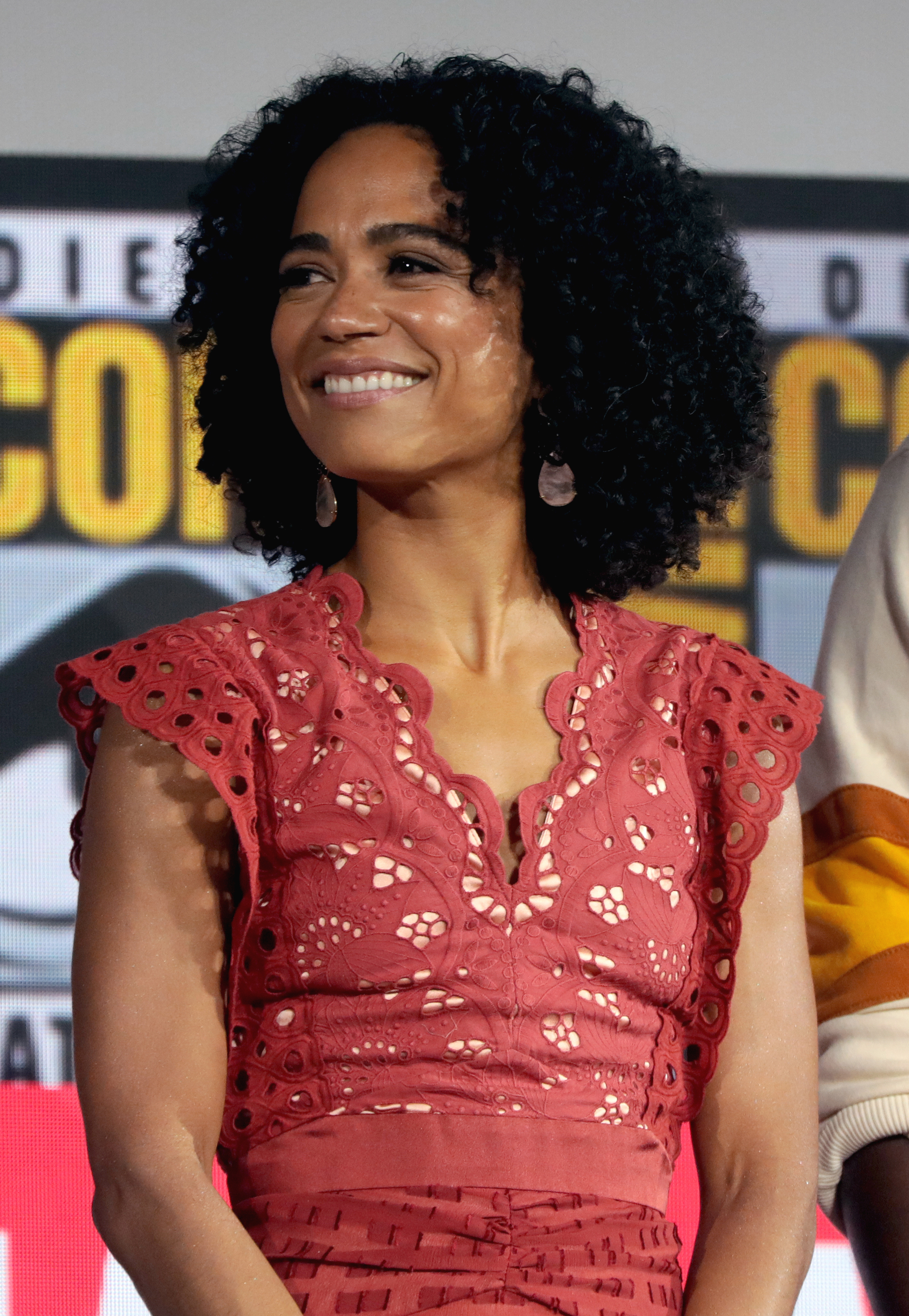
Lauren Ridloff

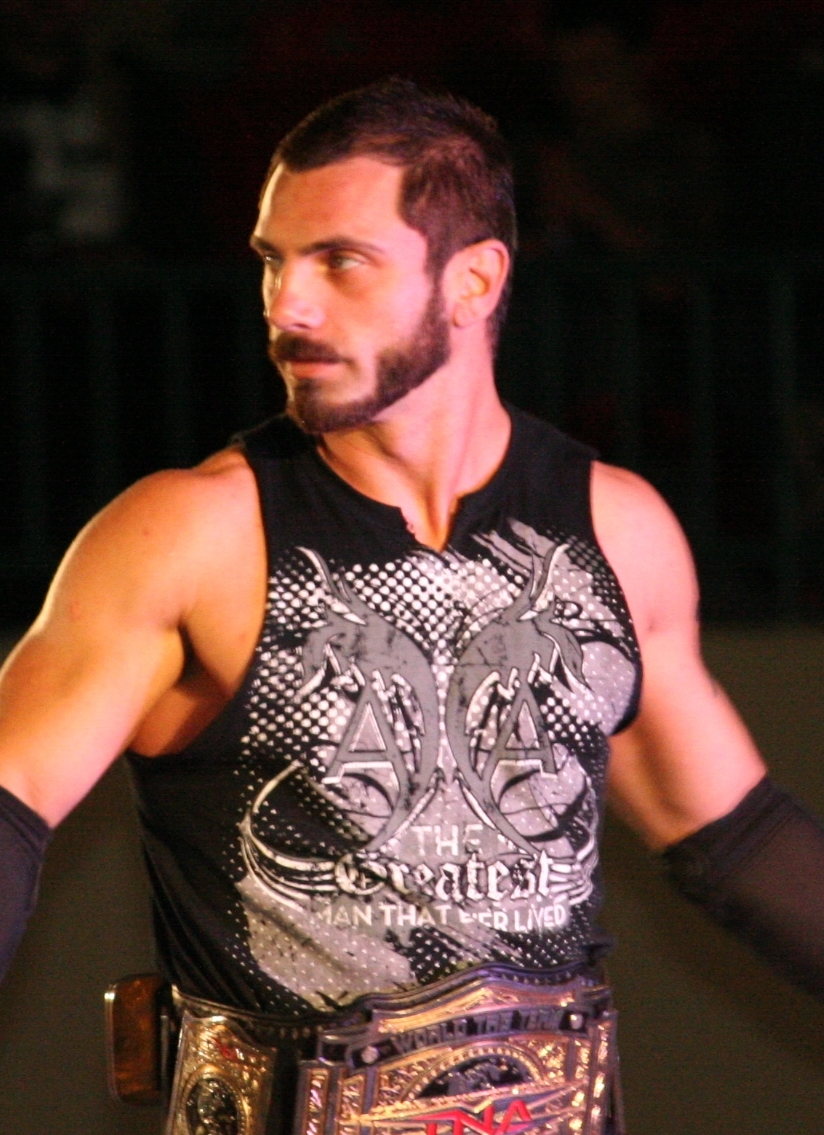
Austin Aries

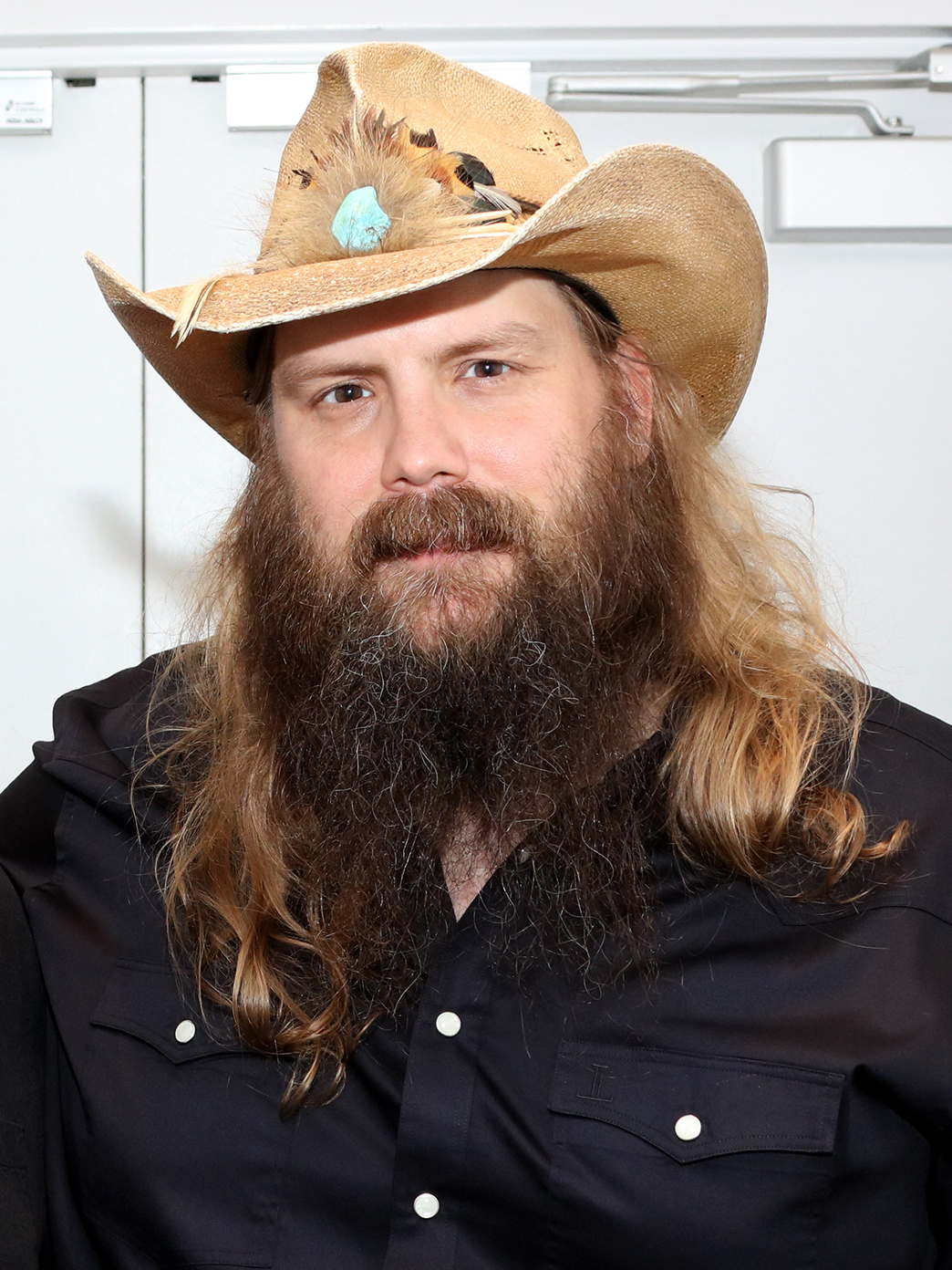
Chris Stapleton

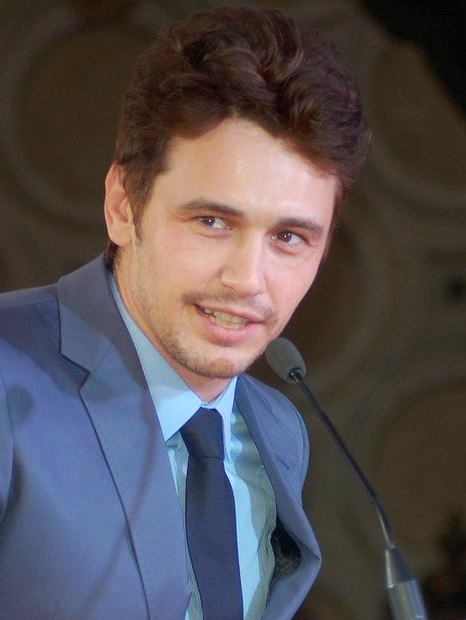
James Franco

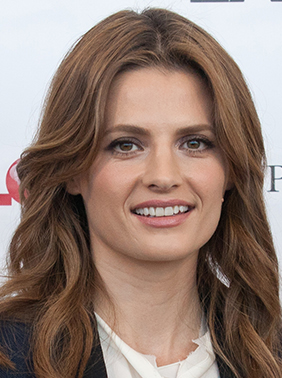
Stana Katic

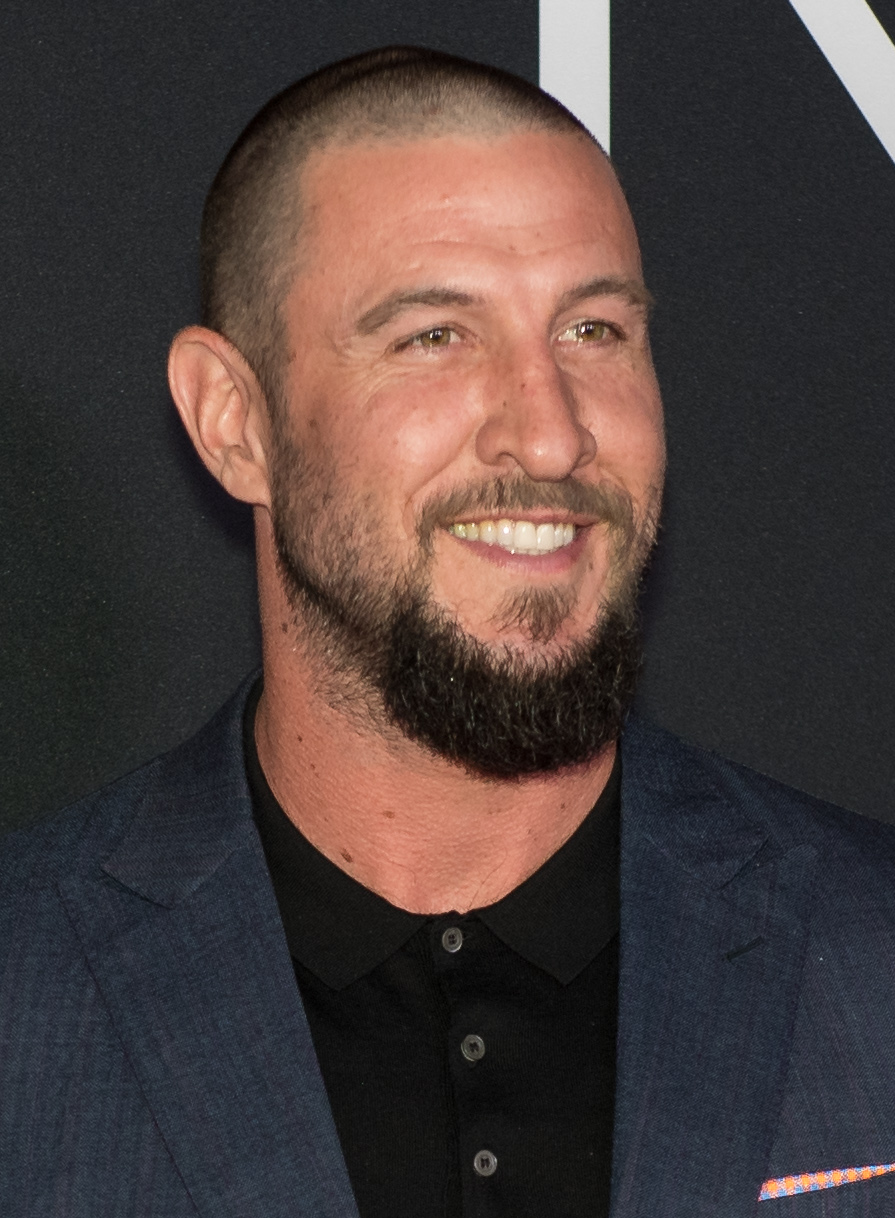
Pablo Schreiber

- April 1
  - Brian Allen, football player
  - Jason Bell, football player and TV pundit
- April 2
  - Nick Berg, businessman and beheading victim (d. 2004)
  - John Gall, baseball player
  - Scott Lynch, author
  - Jaime Ray Newman, actress, producer, and singer
- April 3 – Mehrsa Baradaran, Iranian-born law professor
- April 4 – Jason Ellison, baseball player
- April 5
  - Brandon Backe, baseball player
  - Gerard Bush, director, writer, producer, author, and activist
  - Stephen Jackson, basketball player
- April 6
  - Bro Safari, moombahton, trap, and dubstep producer
  - Tim Hasselbeck, football player
  - Lauren Ridloff, actress
- April 12
  - Kelly Arnold, politician
  - Andru Bemis, musician
  - Scott Crary, director, producer, and writer
  - Riley Smith, actor
- April 13
  - DeVon Franklin, actor, producer, author, and motivational speaker
  - Kyle Howard, actor
  - Chris Sligh, singer
- April 15
  - Austin Aries, wrestler
  - Milton Bradley, baseball player
  - Chris Stapleton, country singer and guitarist
- April 16 – Duane Betts, singer/songwriter and guitarist for The Allman Betts Band
- April 17
  - Tarn Adams, computer game programmer
  - Chris Booker, radio and television personality
- April 18
  - Ajmal Ahmady, Afghan-born economist and politician
  - Pat Batteaux, football player
- April 19
  - K. Tempest Bradford, science fiction and fantasy author and editor
  - James Franco, actor
  - Joanna Gaines, television personality, host, and chef
- April 20
  - Rebecca Makkai, novelist and short story writer
  - Matthew Wilkas, actor, playwright, and television personality
- April 21
  - Molly Bloom, author
  - Branden Steineckert, drummer for Rancid and The Used (2001–2006)
- April 22
  - DJ Drama, DJ, record executive, and music promoter
  - Manu Intiraymi, actor
- April 23 – Ian Brennan, screenwriter, director and actor
- April 24
  - Tim Bainey Jr., stock car racing driver
  - Marcus Brunson, sprinter
- April 25 – Ben Bridwell, singer/songwriter and frontman for Band of Horses
- April 26
  - Avant, R&B singer
  - Joe Crede, baseball player
  - Stana Katic, Canadian-born actress
  - Pablo Schreiber, Canadian-born actor
- April 27 – Jim James, guitarist and frontman for My Morning Jacket
- April 28 – Robert Oliveri, actor
- April 29 – Bob and Mike Bryan, tennis team and twin brothers
- April 30 – Kim Black, Olympic swimmer

=== May ===
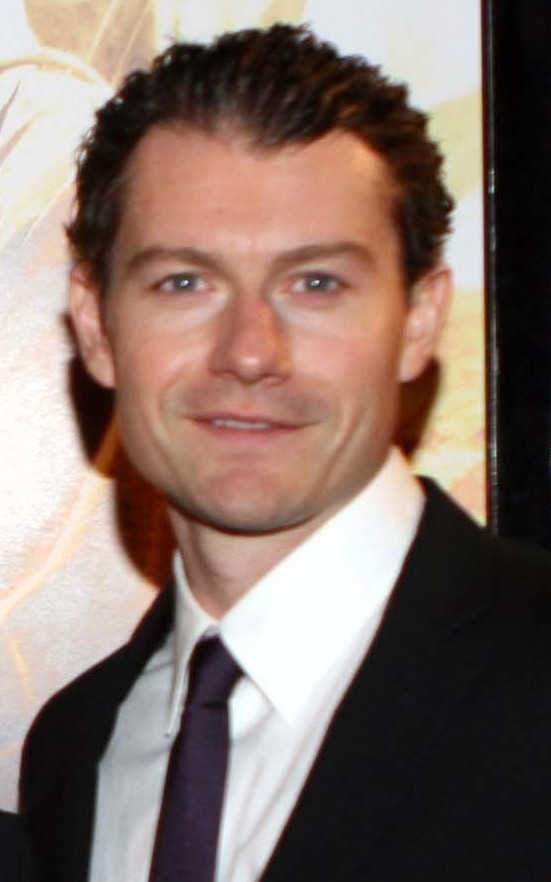
James Badge Dale

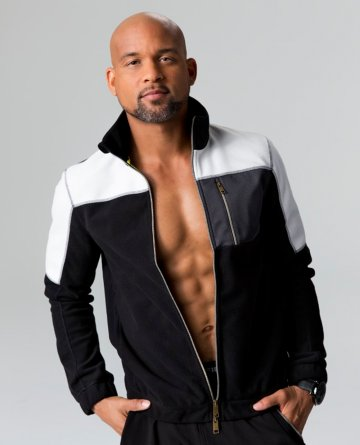
Shaun T

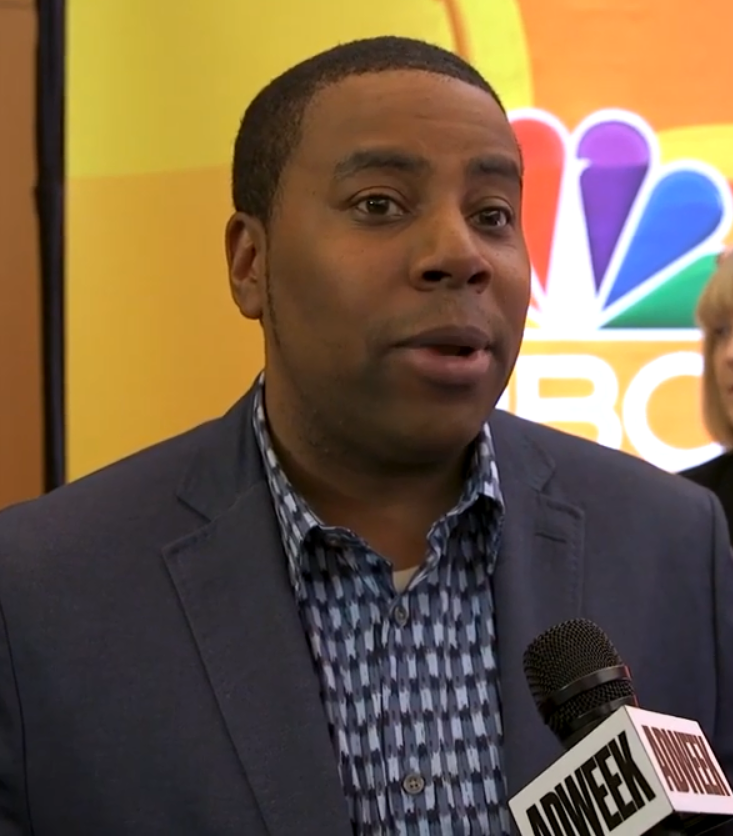
Kenan Thompson

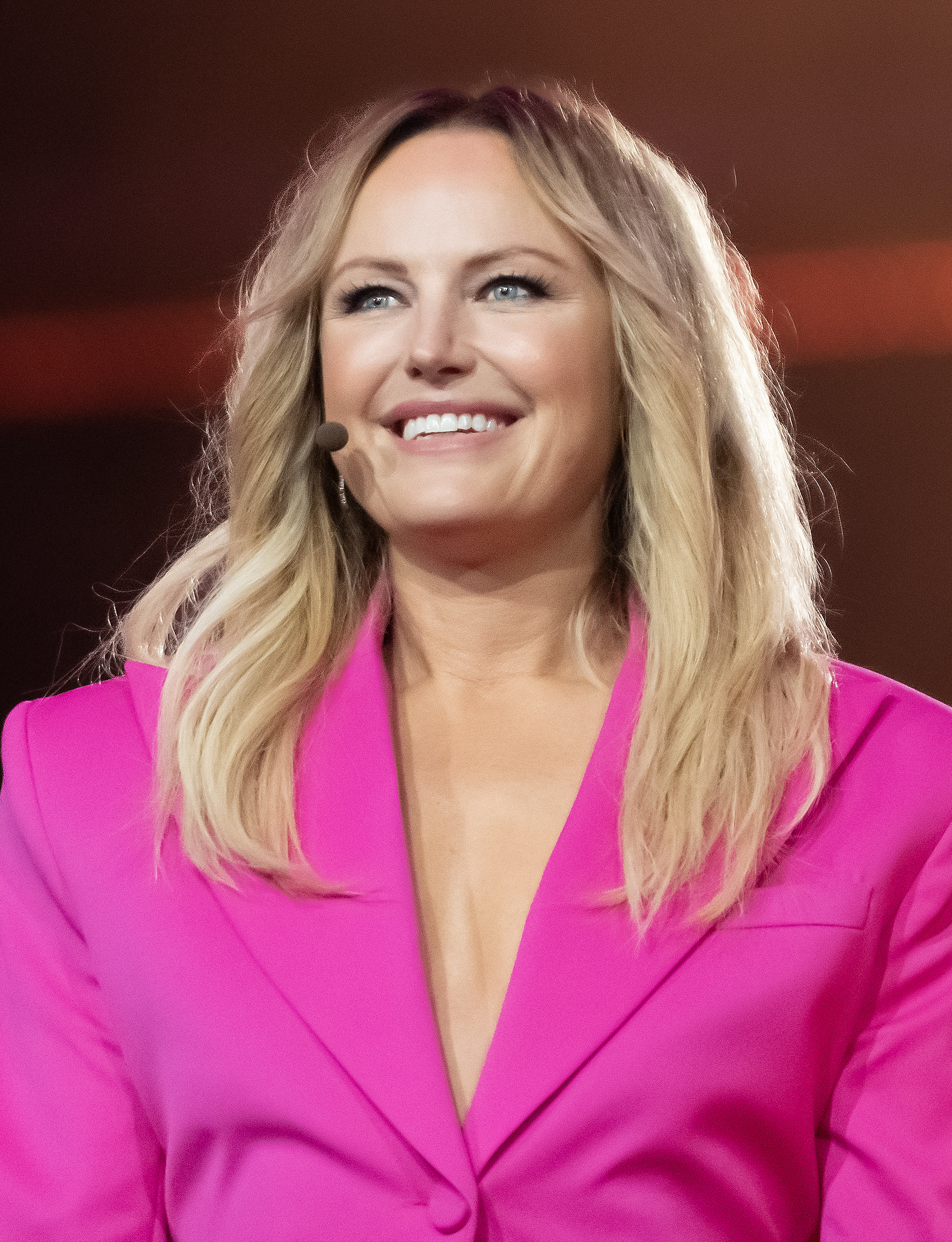
Malin Akerman

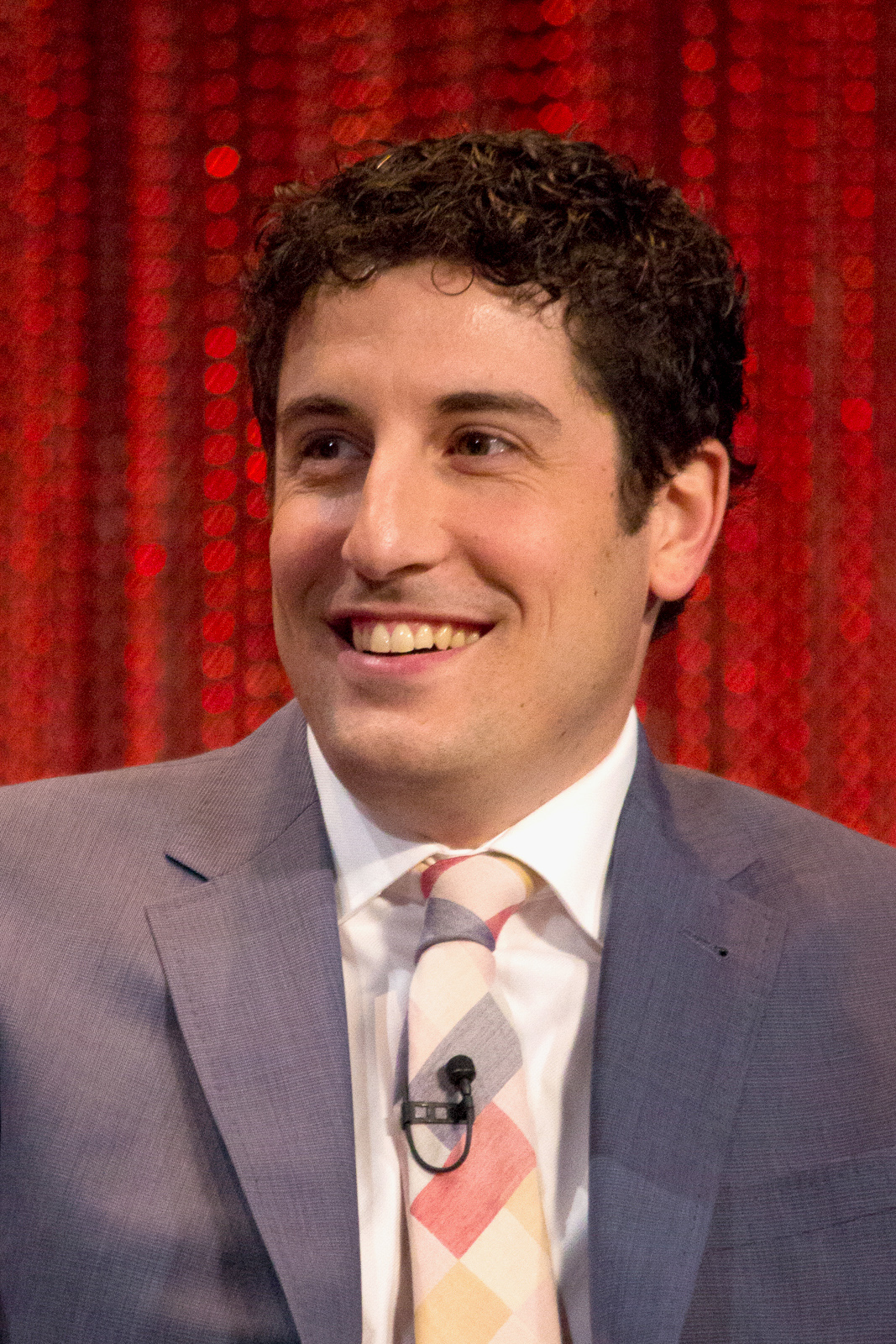
Jason Biggs

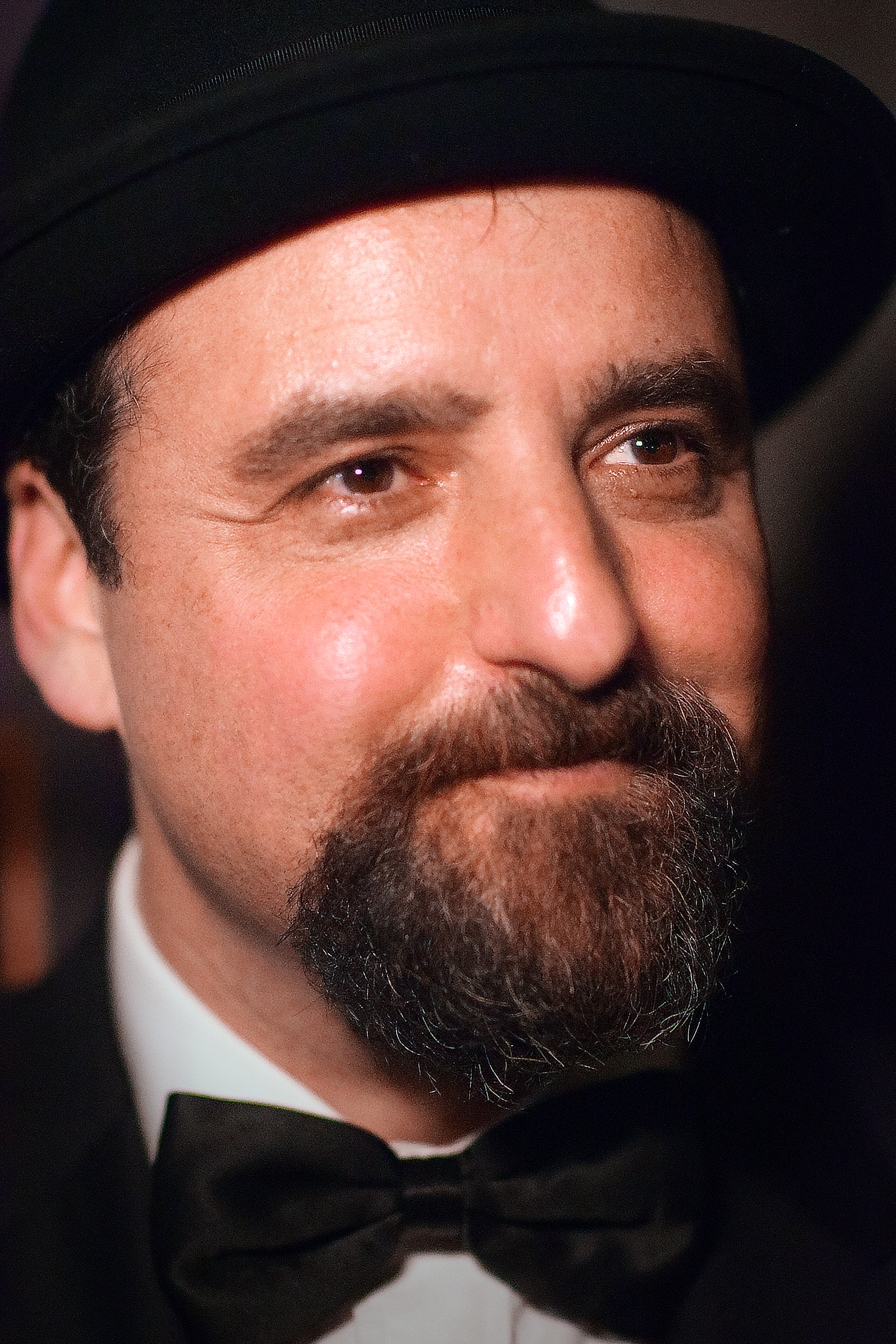
David Krumholtz

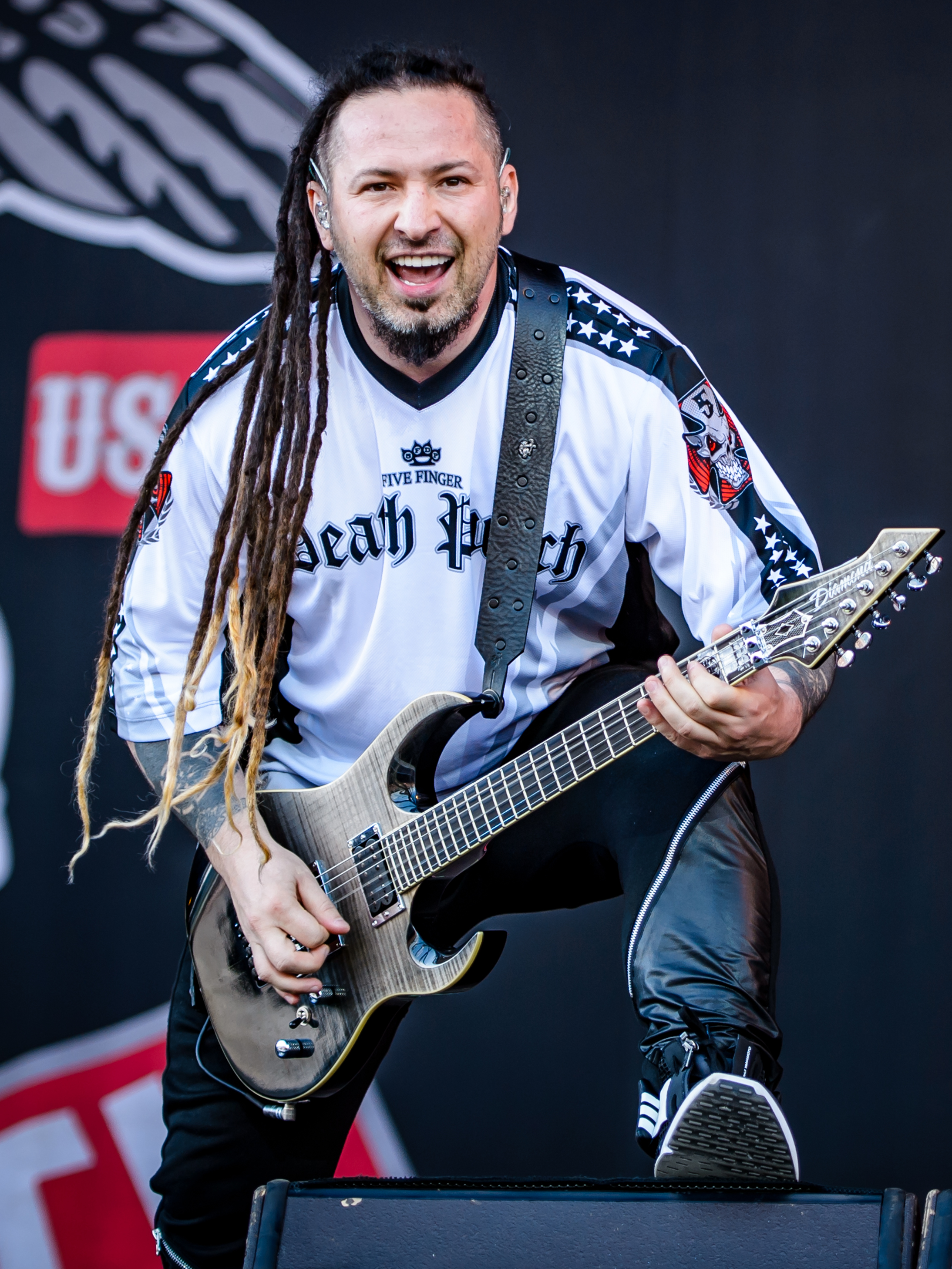
Zoltan Bathory

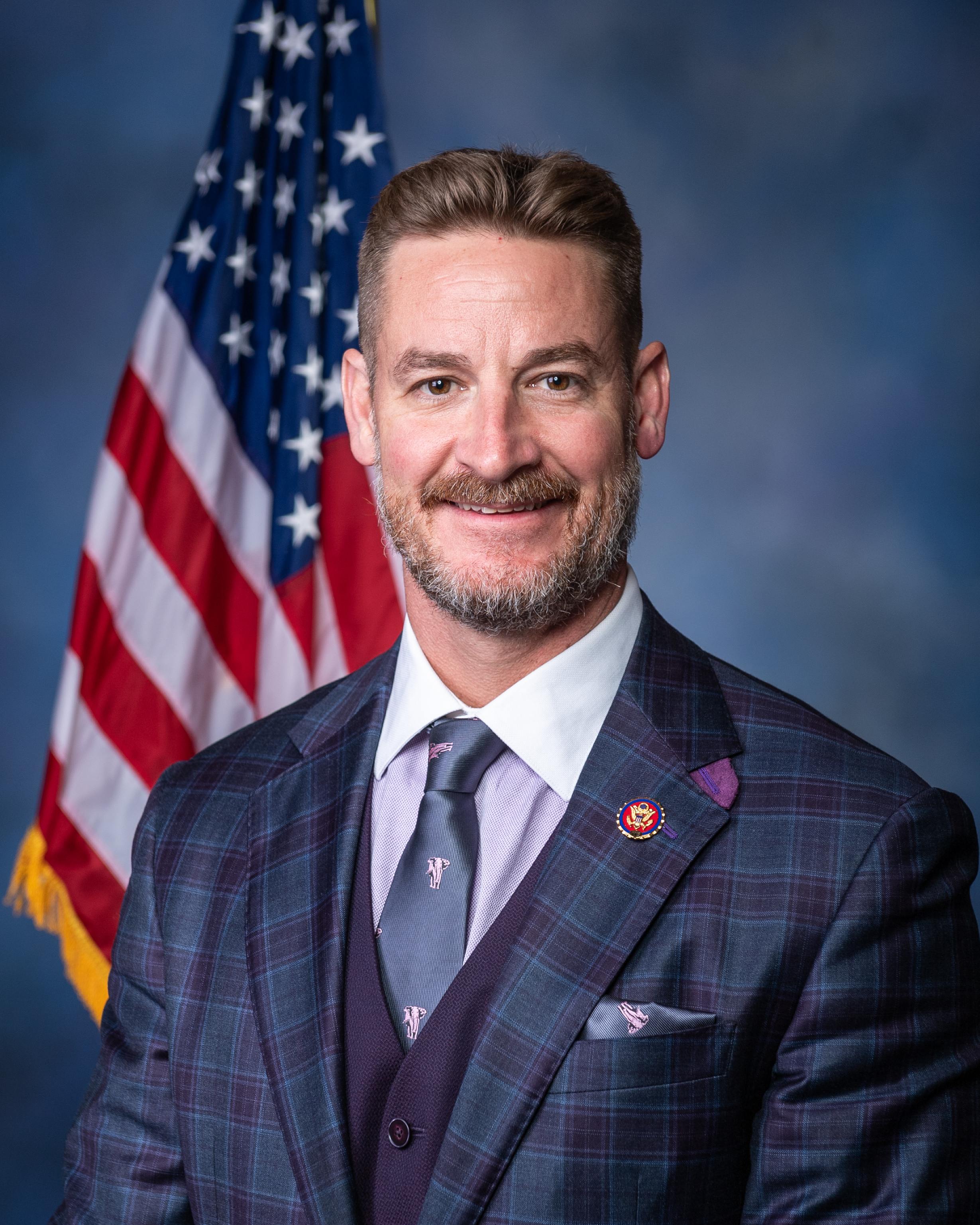
Greg Steube

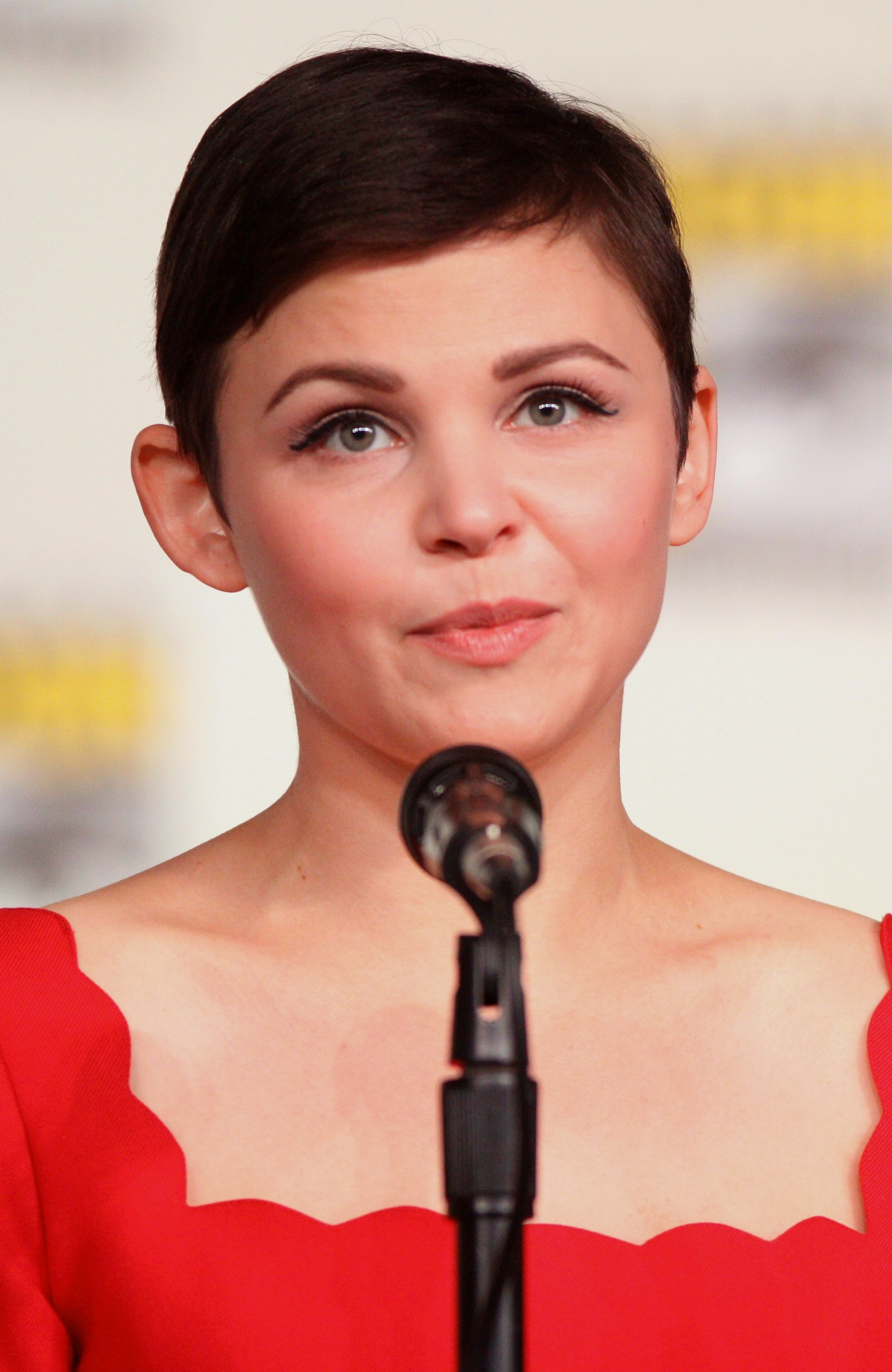
Ginnifer Goodwin

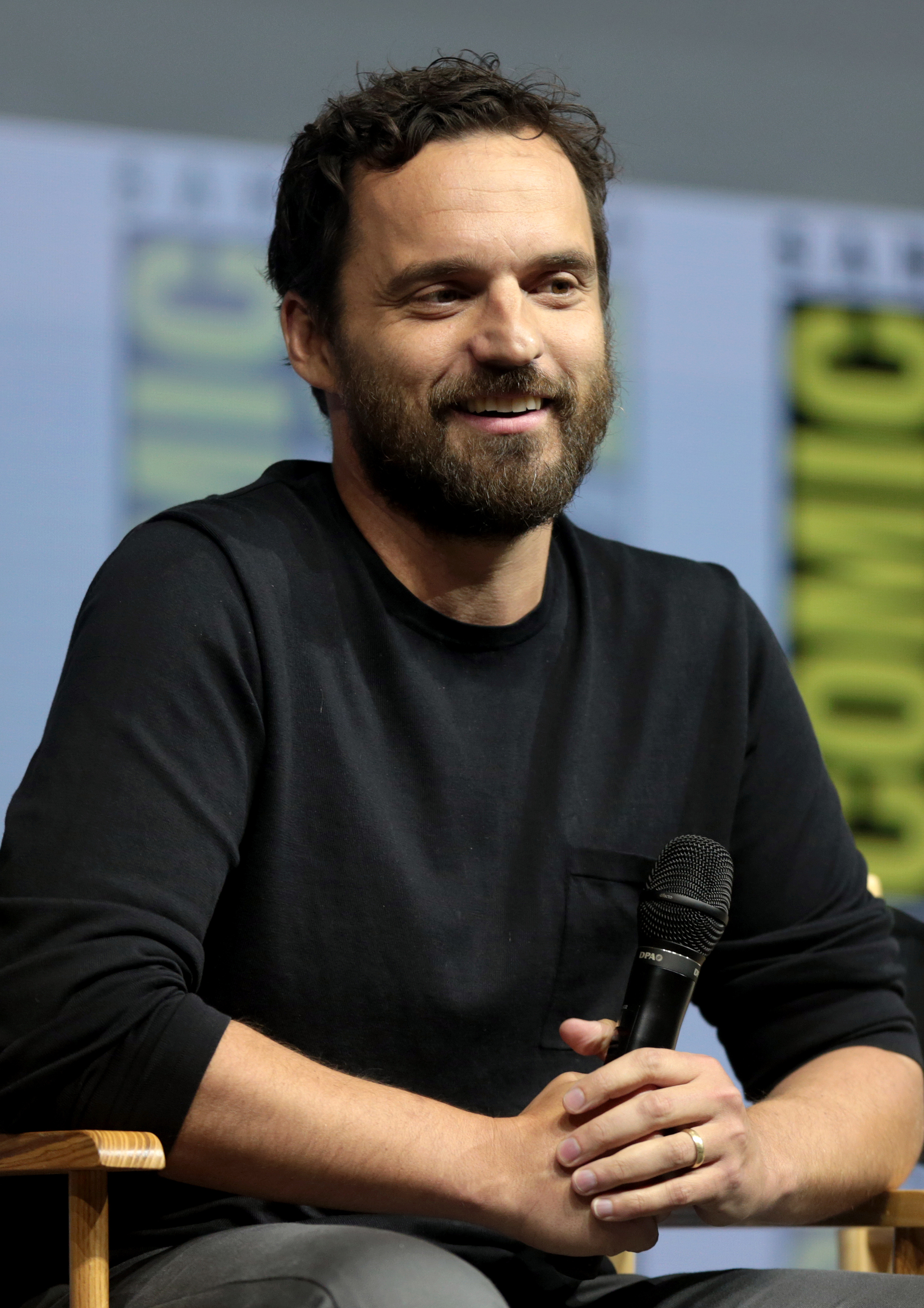
Jake Johnson

- May 1
  - James Badge Dale, actor
  - Nick Traina, singer/songwriter (Link 80) (d. 1997)
  - Michael Russell, tennis player
- May 2
  - Rob Bruchman, politician
  - Shaun T, fitness trainer
- May 3
  - Paul Banks, British-born singer, guitarist, and frontman for Interpol
  - Walter Bernard, football player
- May 4
  - Erin Andrews, television host and personality
  - James Harrison, football player
- May 6
  - John Abraham, football player
  - Erik Anderson, ice hockey player
- May 7
  - Brian Clevinger, author
  - Shawn Marion, basketball player
- May 8 – Matthew Davis, actor
- May 9
  - Antwain Britt, mixed martial artist
  - Daniel Franzese, actor
  - Aaron Harang, baseball player
- May 10
  - Geoff Abrams, tennis player
  - Todd Gloria, politician, mayor of San Diego, California (2013–2014, 2020–present)
  - Kenan Thompson, actor and comedian
- May 11
  - Courtney Banghart, basketball player and coach
  - Lisa Bender, politician
  - Scott Matzka, ice hockey player (d. 2018)
- May 12
  - Malin Akerman, Swedish-born actress and model
  - Jason Biggs, actor
  - Dee Brown, football player
  - Josh Phelps, baseball player
- May 13
  - Brooke Anderson, television host and correspondent
  - Mike Bibby, basketball player
  - Ryan Bukvich, baseball player
  - Barry Zito, baseball player
- May 15
  - Josh Burns, mixed martial artist
  - David Krumholtz, actor
  - Krissy Taylor, model (d. 1995)
- May 16
  - Josh Arnold, radio personality
  - Zoltan Bathory, Hungarian-born guitarist for Five Finger Death Punch
  - Nick Bierbrodt, baseball player
  - Courtney Blades, softball player
  - Vincent LaRusso, actor
- May 17
  - Lisa Brennan-Jobs, writer
  - Kat Foster, actress
- May 18
  - Carolina Bermudez, radio presenter
- May 19 – Greg Steube, politician
- May 20 – Harold Blackmon, football player
- May 21 – Briana Banks, German-born pornographic actress and model
- May 22
  - Meghan Addy, sprinter
  - Esao Andrews, painter
  - Ginnifer Goodwin, actress
  - Daniel Rodimer, wrestler, football player, and political candidate
- May 23
  - Anthony Buich, football player
  - Jesse Heiman, actor and comedian
  - Mike Gonzalez, baseball player
  - Carolyn Moos, model and basketball player
  - Scott Raynor, drummer
- May 24
  - Amy Becher, curler
  - Ronald Blackshear, basketball player
  - Bryan Greenberg, actor
- May 25
  - Cory Arcangel, post-conceptual artist
  - Brian Urlacher, football player
- May 26
  - Rich Brzeski, lacrosse player
  - Phil Elvrum, singer-songwriter and guitarist
  - Benji Gregory, actor
- May 27
  - Hugo Armando, tennis player
  - James Bettcher, football coach
  - Adin Brown, soccer player and coach
- May 28
  - Adam Robitel, film director, producer, screenwriter, and actor
  - Jake Johnson, actor and comedian
- May 29 – Lorenzo Odone, American adrenoleukodystrophy patient (d. 2008)
- May 31 – Eli Bremer, Olympic pentathlete

=== June ===
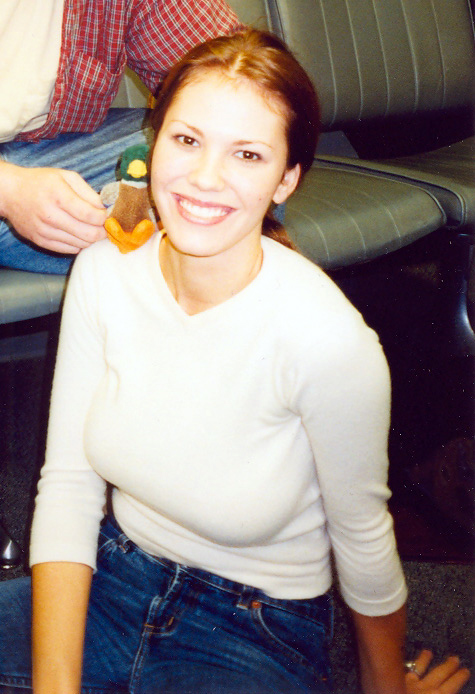
Nikki Cox

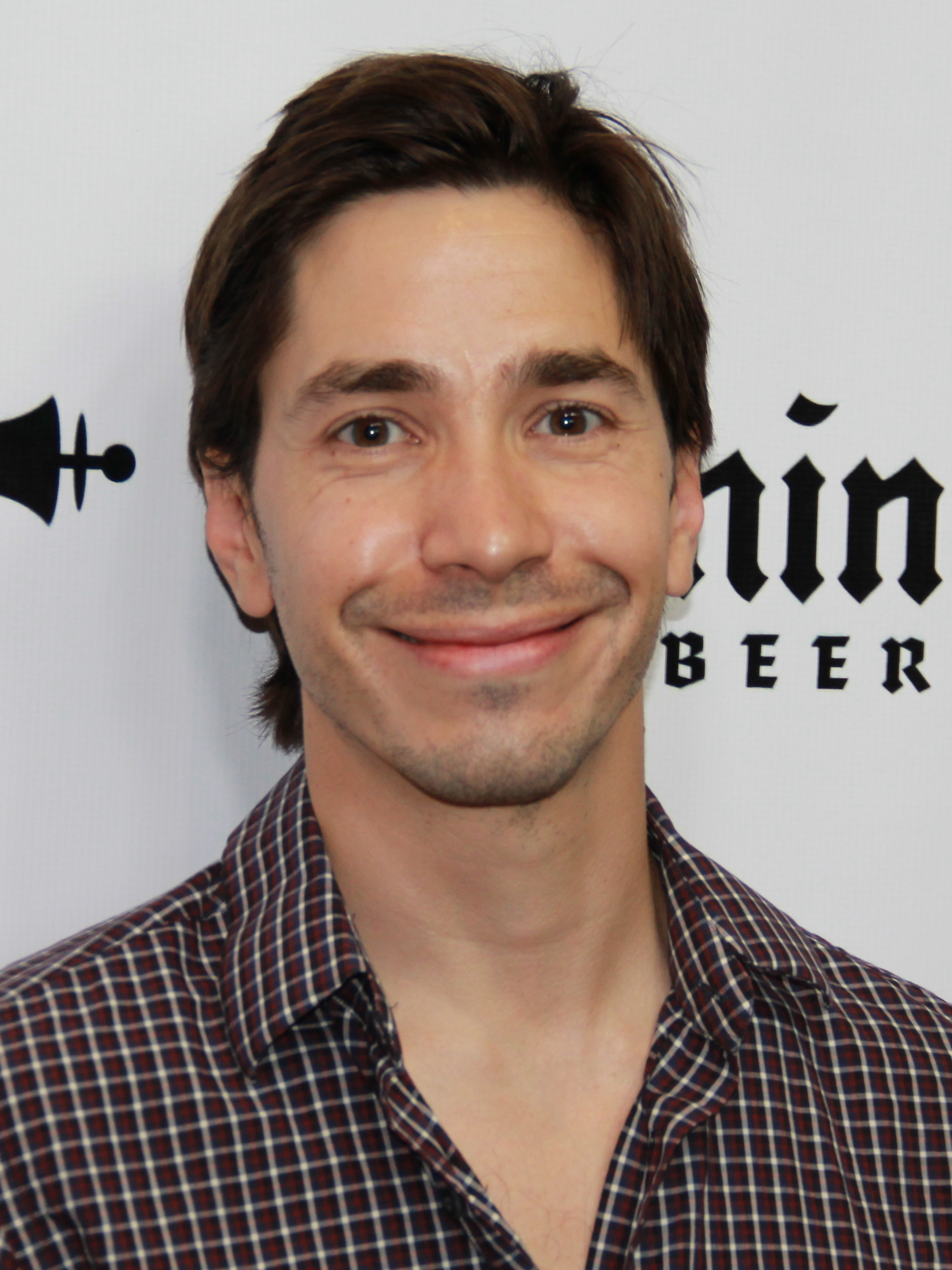
Justin Long

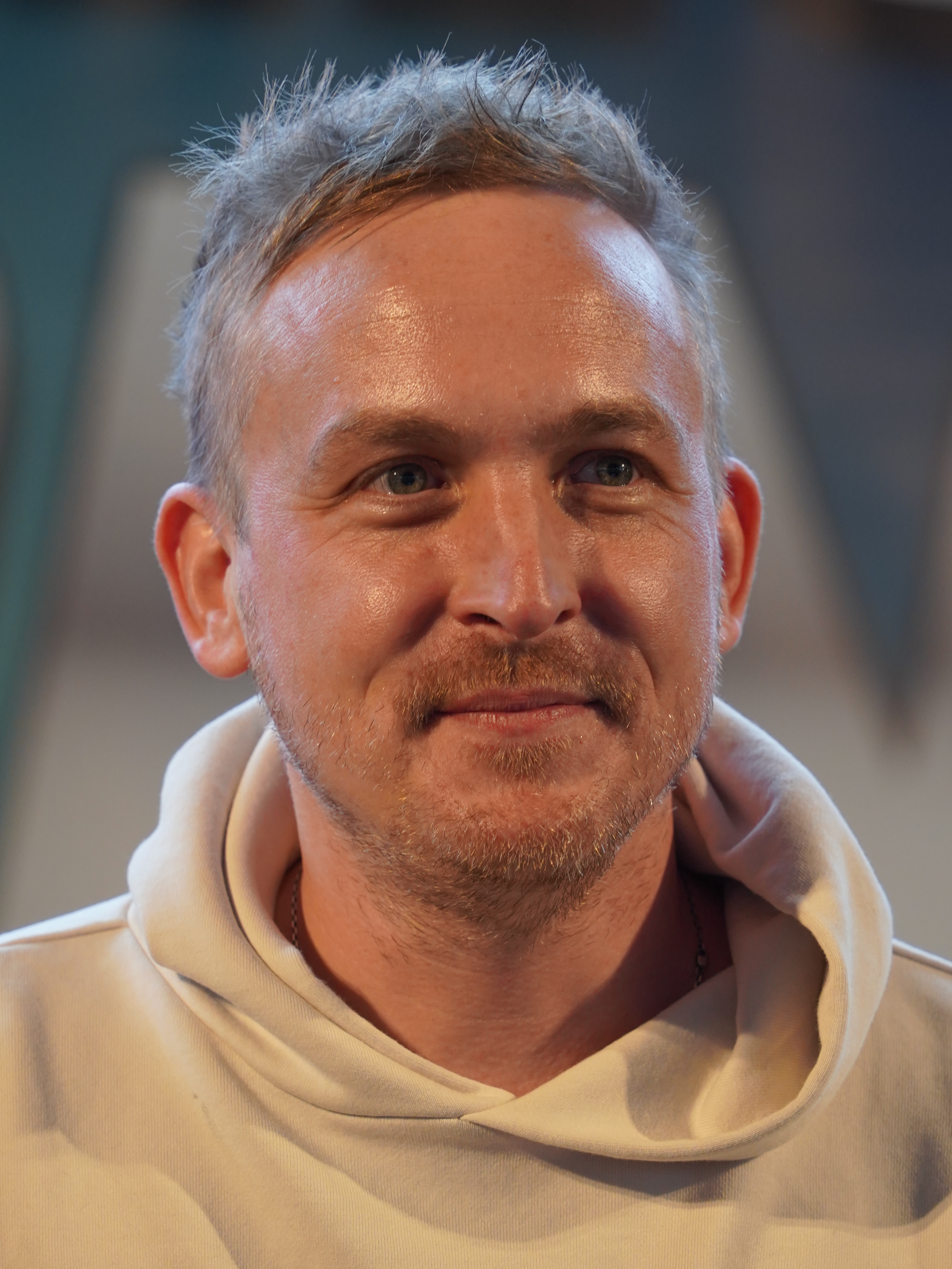
Robin Lord Taylor

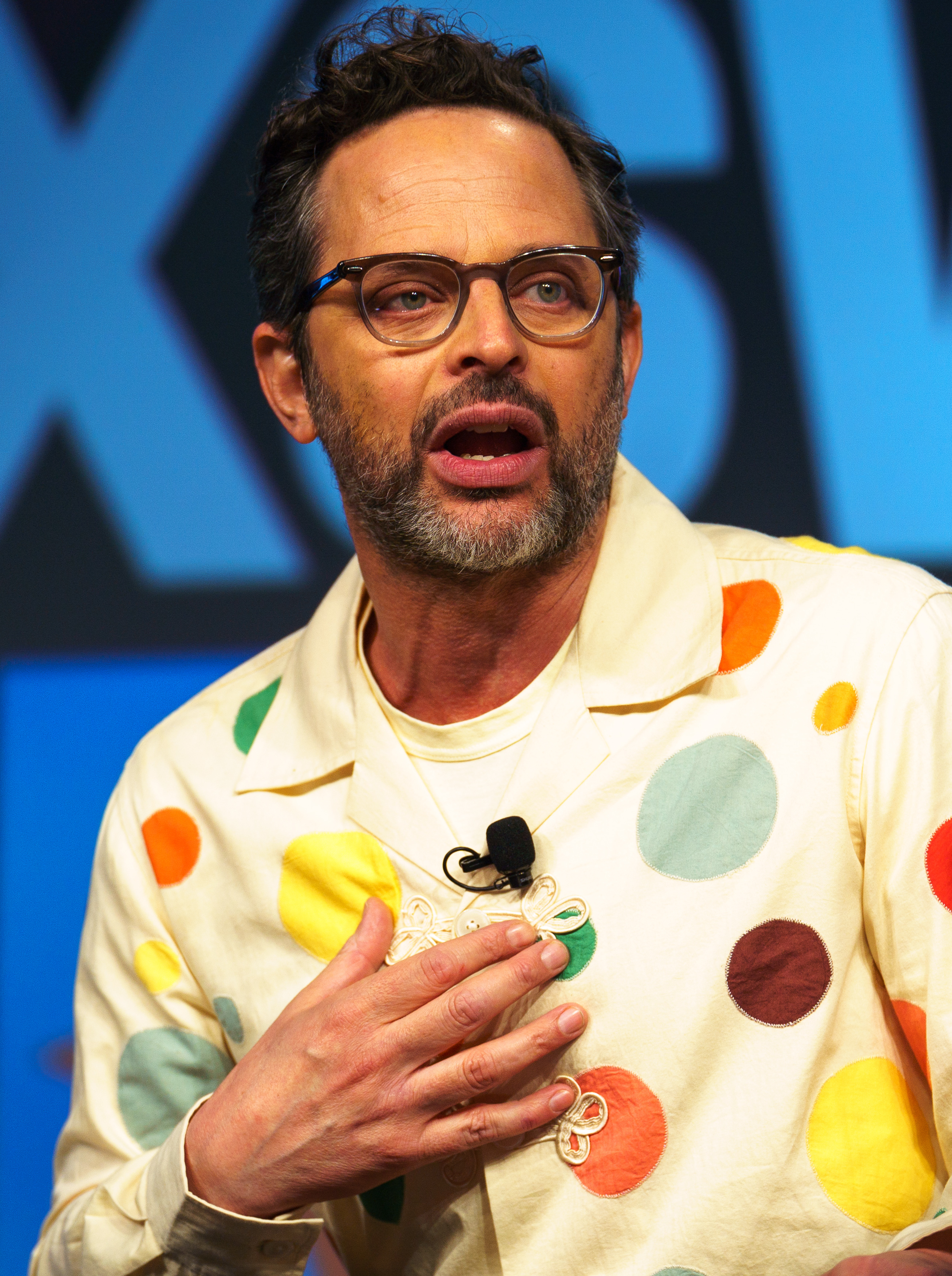
Nick Kroll

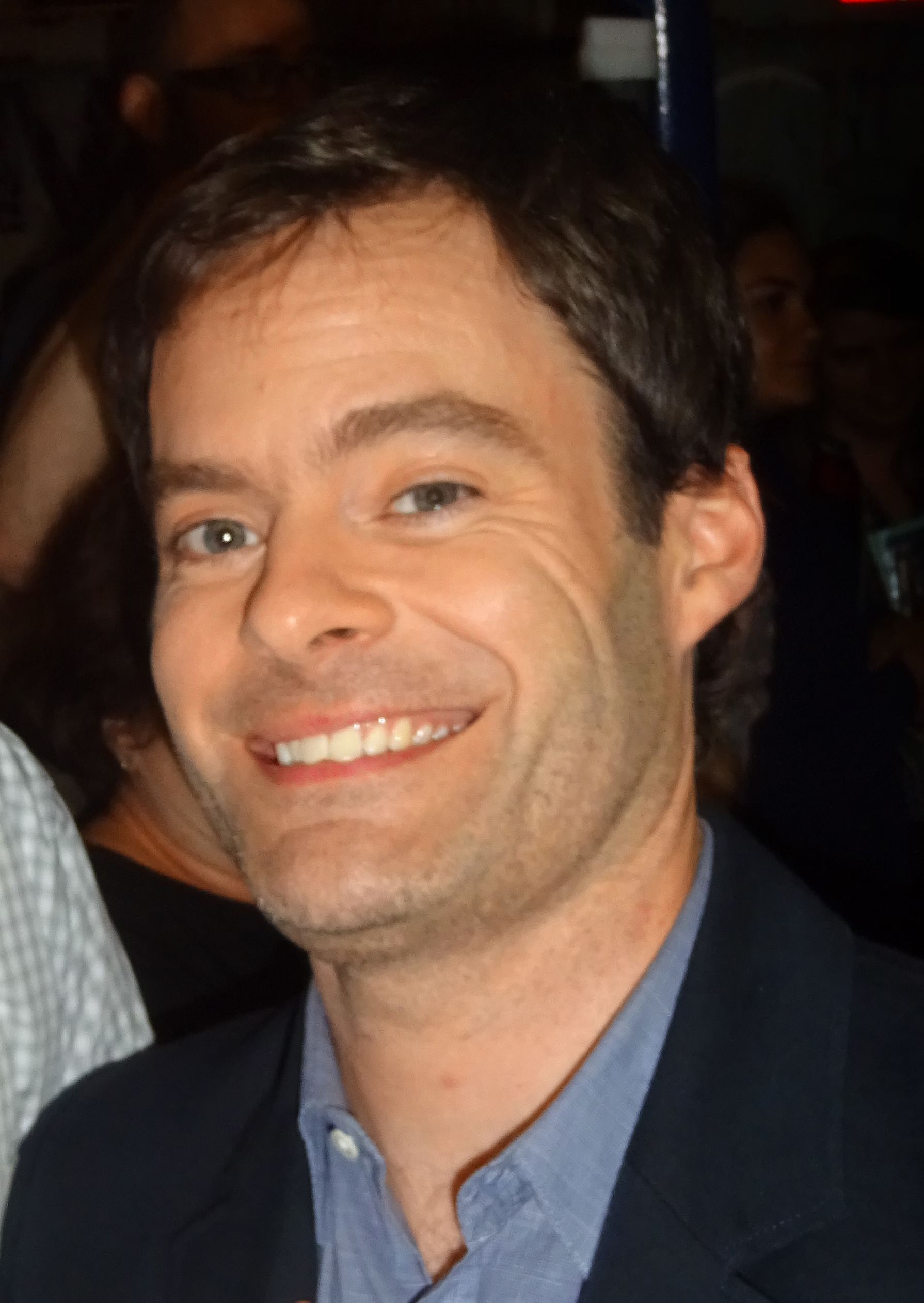
Bill Hader

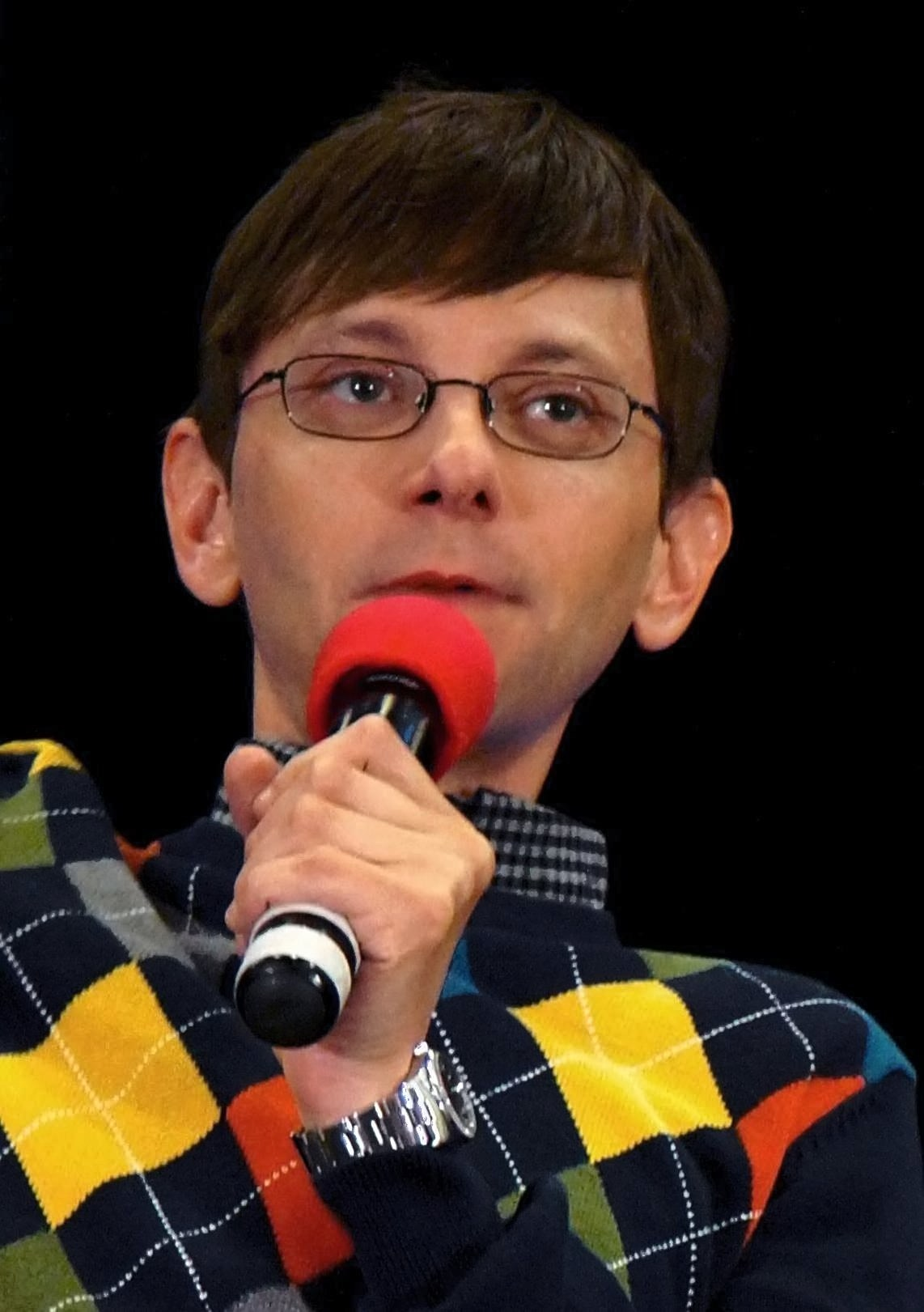
DJ Qualls

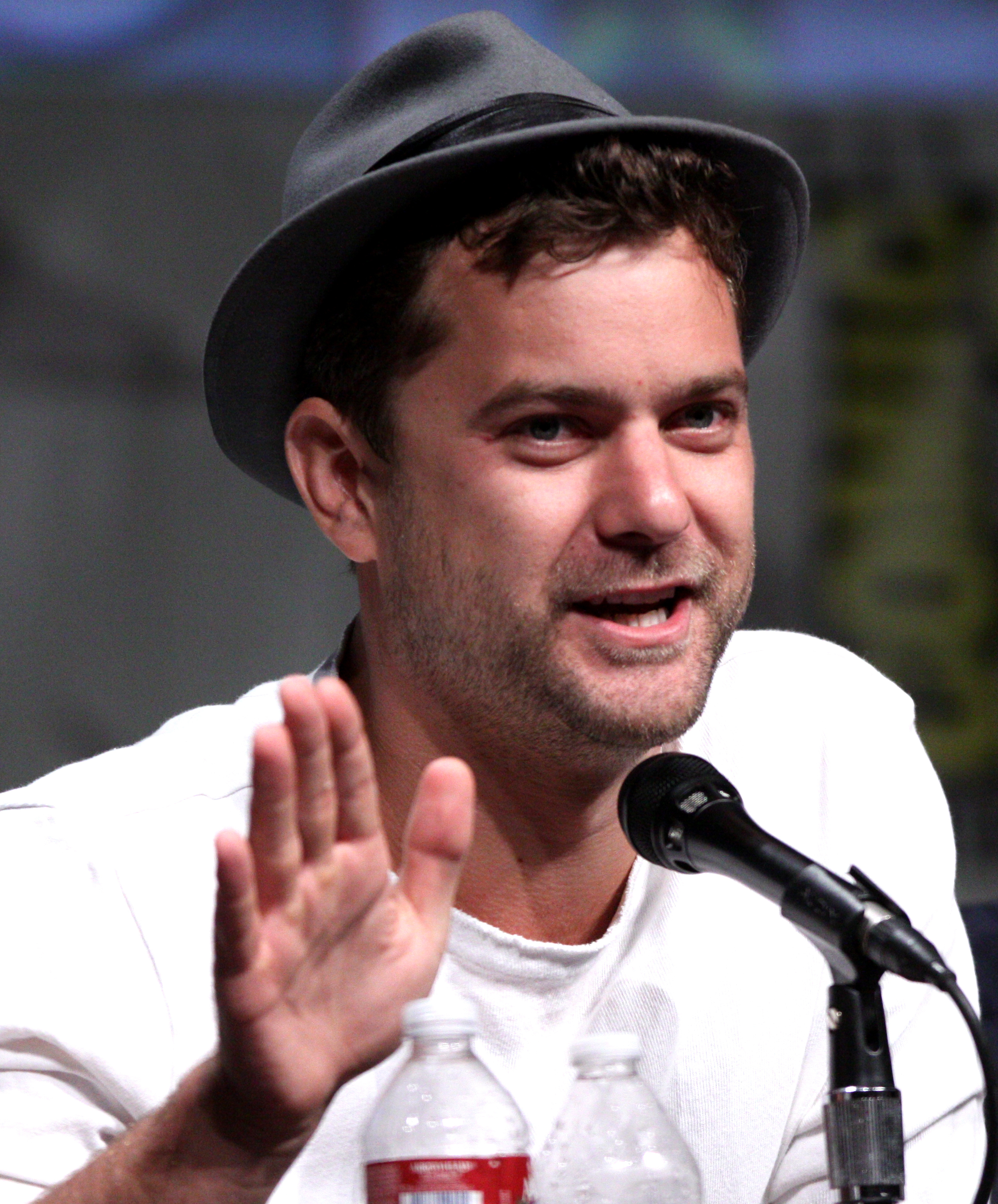
Joshua Jackson

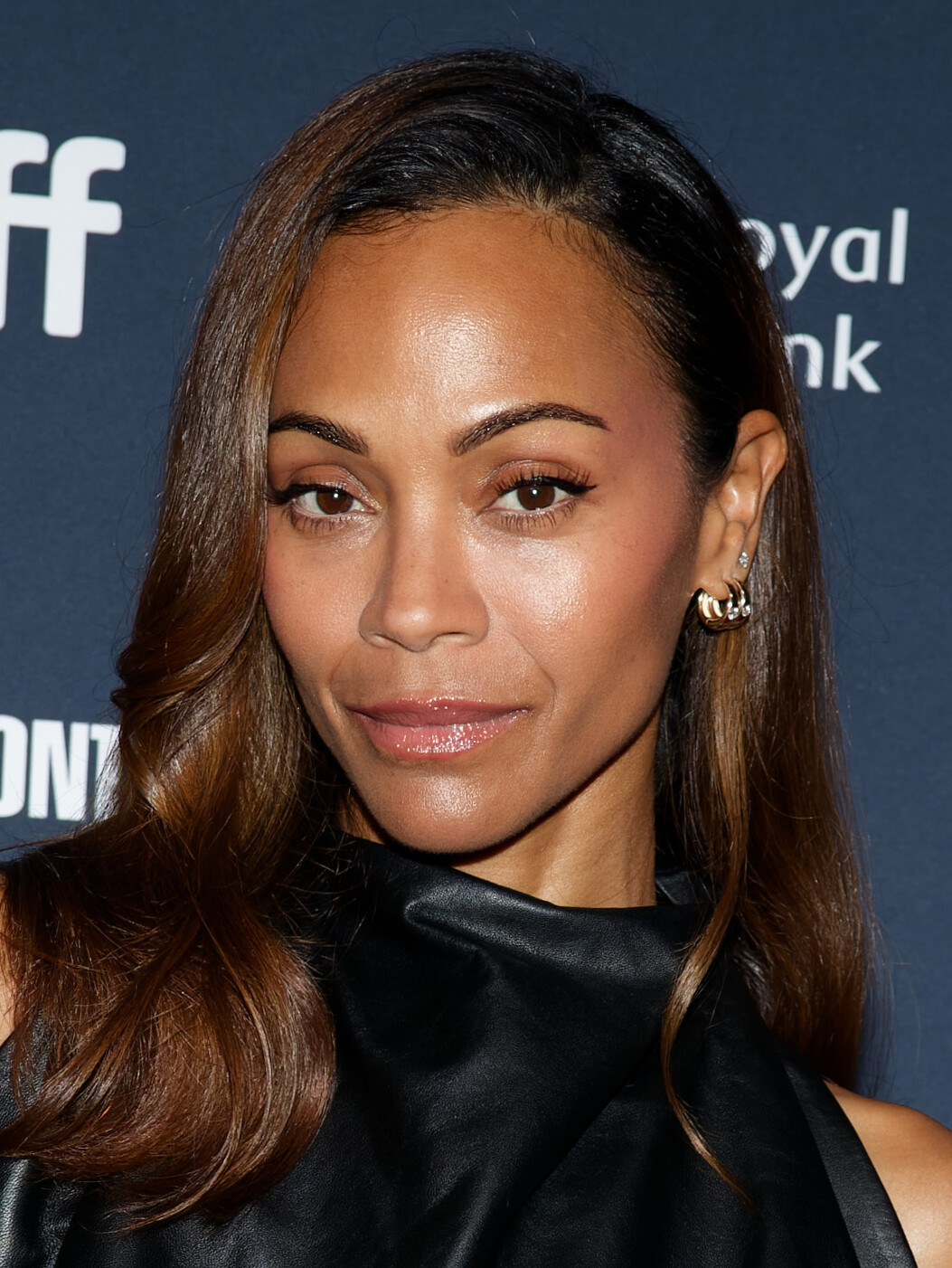
Zoe Saldaña

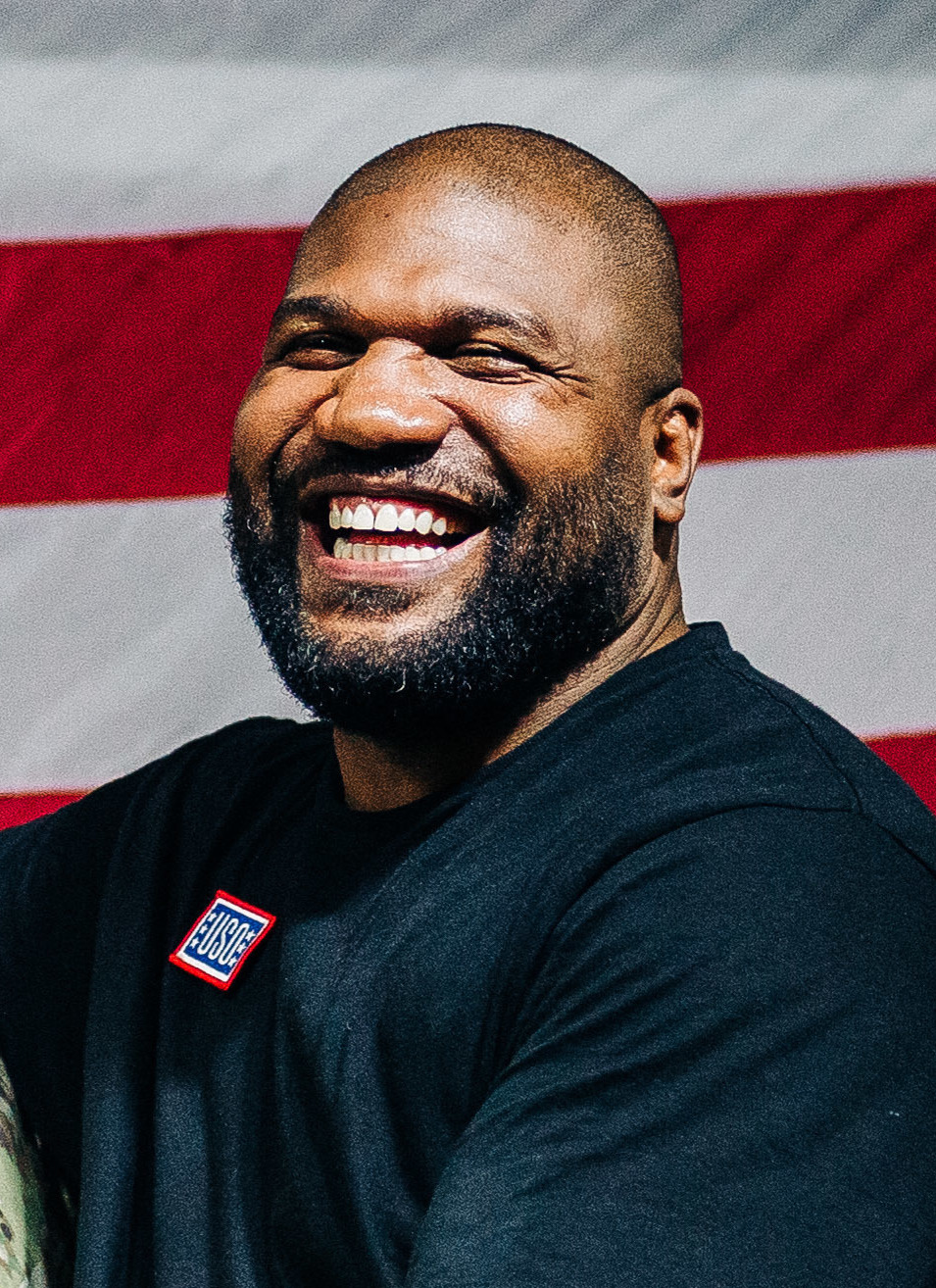
Rampage Jackson

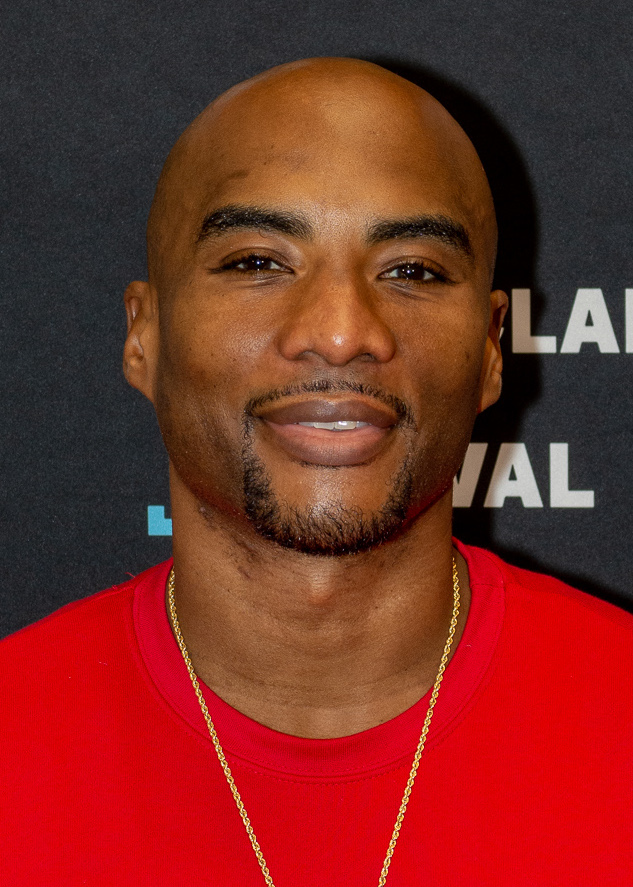
Charlamagne tha God

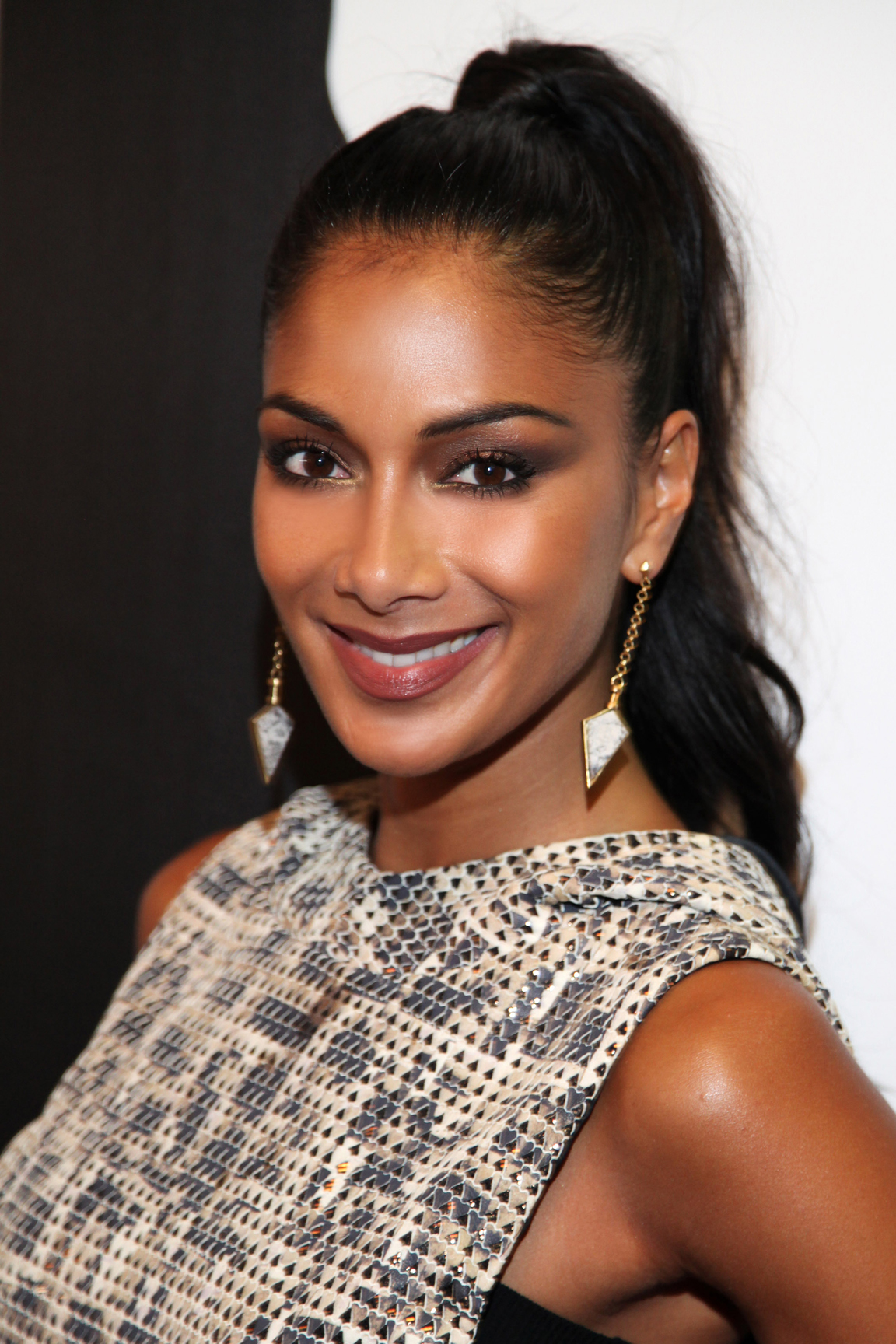
Nicole Scherzinger

- June 1
  - Danny Boyd, football player
  - Matthew Hittinger, poet and author
  - Link Neal, musician, comedian, and internet personality
- June 2
  - Nikki Cox, actress and comedy writer
  - Justin Long, actor
- June 4
  - Mike Apple, soccer player
  - Scott Cawthon, video game developer and writer
  - Josh McDermitt, actor and comedian
  - Robin Lord Taylor, actor
- June 5 – Nick Kroll, actor and comedian
- June 6
  - Judith Barsi, actress and murder victim (d. 1988)
  - Marla Brumfield, basketball player
  - J. T. Buck, composer, lyricist, stage director, and project coordinator
- June 7
  - Tony Ahn, singer and member of H.O.T.
  - Jesse Ball, poet, fiction writer and artist
  - Bill Hader, actor
- June 8 – Maria Menounos, actress, journalist, and television presenter
- June 9
  - Matt Adamczyk, politician
  - Michaela Conlin, actress
  - Shandi Finnessey, beauty queen and actress
  - Hayden Schlossberg, screenwriter, director, and producer
  - Brian Patrick Wade, actor and physical trainer
- June 10
  - Raheem Brock, football player
  - Mr. Del, Christian rapper and music producer
  - DJ Qualls, actor, producer, and model
  - Shane West, actor, punk rock musician, and songwriter
- June 11 – Joshua Jackson, Canadian-born actor
- June 12
  - David Buchwald, politician
  - Jeremy Rowley, character actor and comedian
  - Timothy Simons, actor
  - Shiloh Strong, actor
- June 13
  - Jake Bronstein, marketer, entrepreneur, internet and television personality, and blogger
  - Ethan Embry, actor
  - Andy Gerold, rock bassist
- June 14
  - Jason Anavitarte, politician
  - Clark Boyd, politician
- June 17 – Matthew Alan, actor
- June 18
  - Ben Gleib, media personality
  - Tara Platt, voice actress and actress
- June 19
  - Tarise Bryson, basketball player
  - Zoe Saldaña, actress
- June 20
  - Linda Arsenio, actress and model
  - Dave Barnes, singer/songwriter
  - Amanda Basica, tennis player
  - Mike Birbiglia, actor, comedian, and writer
  - Rampage Jackson, mixed martial arts fighter
  - Bobby Seay, baseball player
- June 21 – Michelle Au, anesthesiologist and politician
- June 22
  - Champ Bailey, football player
  - Matt Doherty, actor
- June 23
  - James Atkins, football player
  - Memphis Bleek, rapper
  - Jeremy Horn, musician and songwriter
  - Nick LaLota, politician
- June 24
  - Ariel Pink, musician
  - Adam Pearce, wrestler
- June 25
  - Cookie Belcher, basketball player
  - Luke Scott, baseball player
  - Marcus Stroud, football player
- June 26
  - Rashidi Barnes, football player
  - Tavorris Bell, streetball player
- June 27
  - Malik Allen, basketball player
  - Scott Bower, soccer player
  - Courtney Ford, actress
  - Marc Terenzi, pop singer
- June 28 – Courtney Burton, boxer
- June 29
  - Charlamagne tha God, radio and TV personality
  - Sam Farrar, bassist for Phantom Planet (1994–2012) and Maroon 5
  - Nicole Scherzinger, actress and singer
- June 30
  - LaVar Arrington, football player
  - Chris Bos, politician
  - Pat Dennis, American football player
  - Jason Schimmel, musician and producer
  - Nate Winkel, soccer player

=== July ===
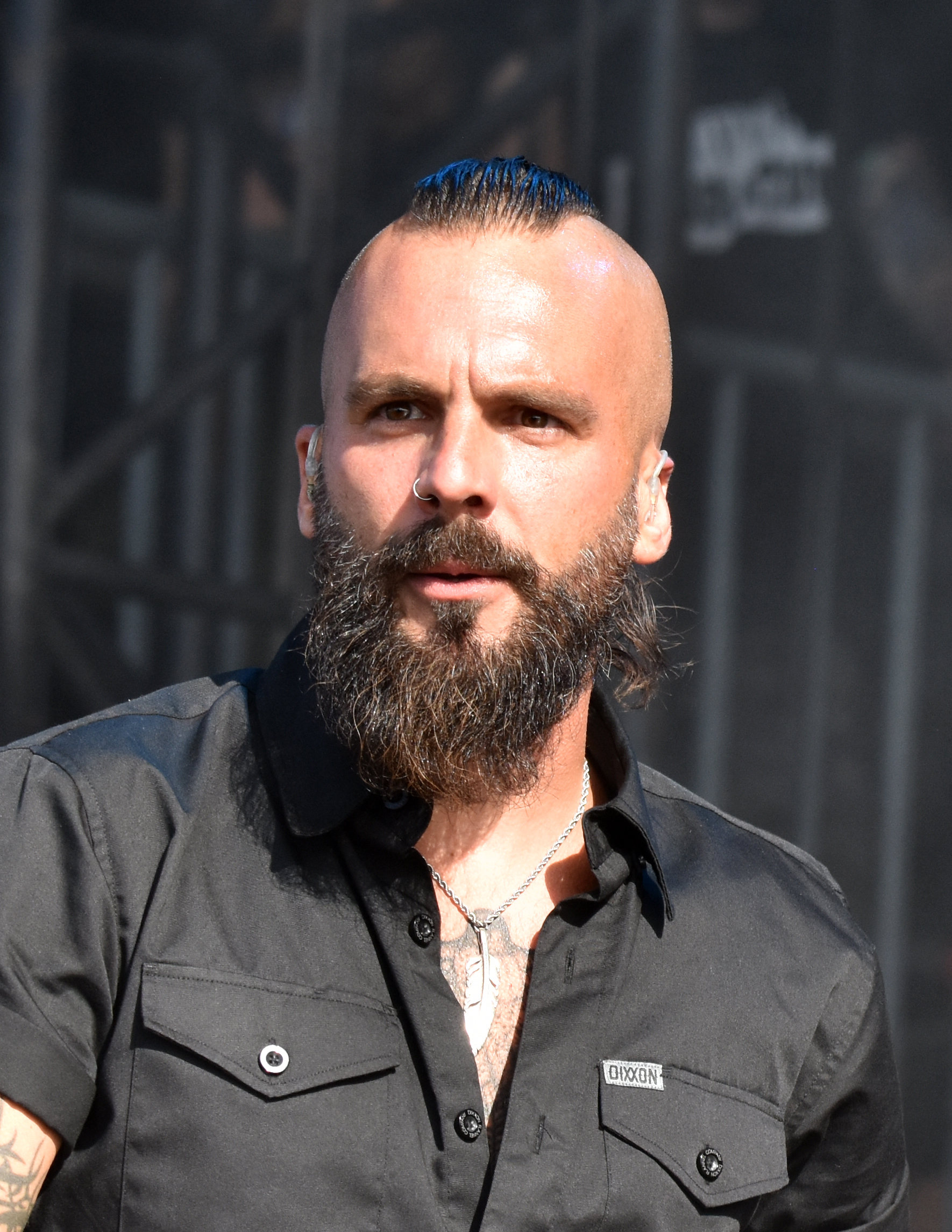
Jesse Leach

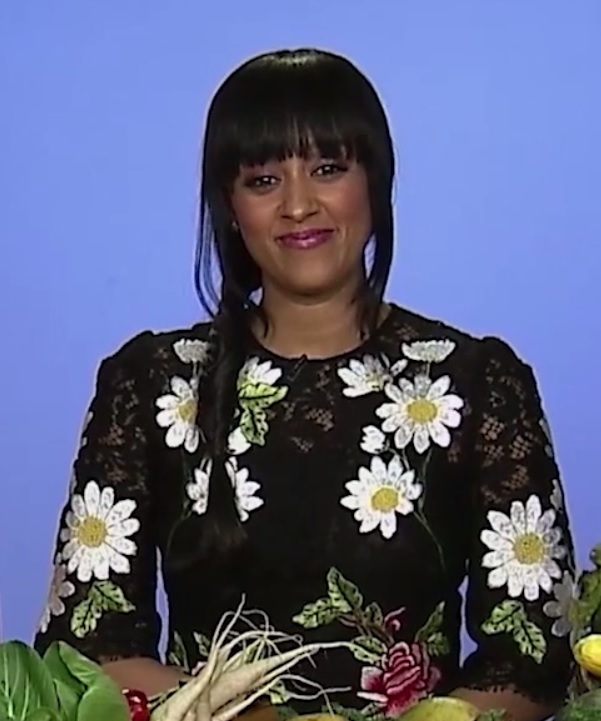
Tia Mowry

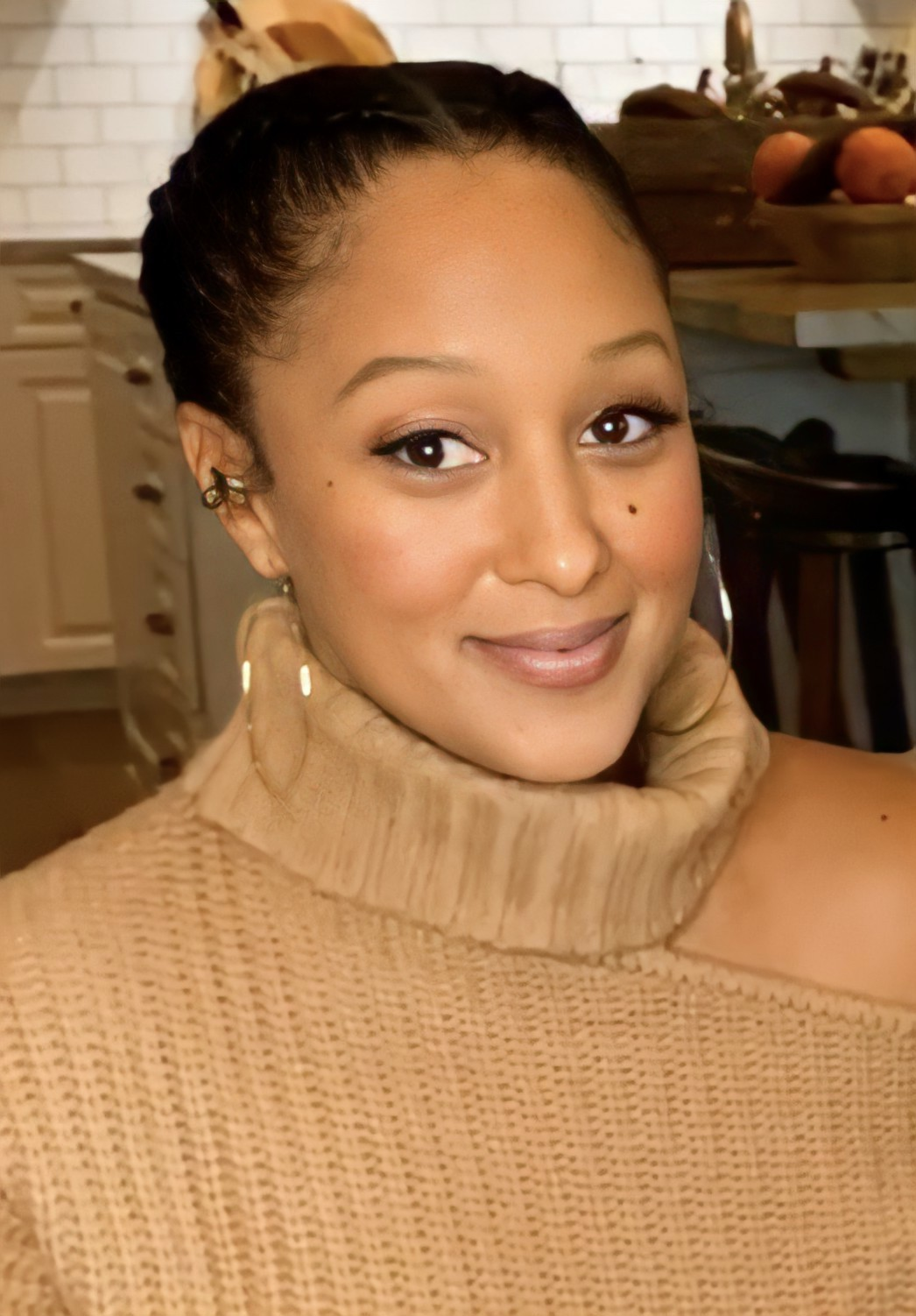
Tamera Mowry

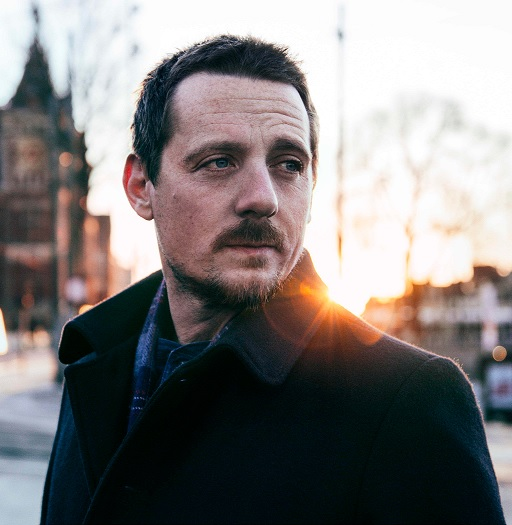
Sturgill Simpson

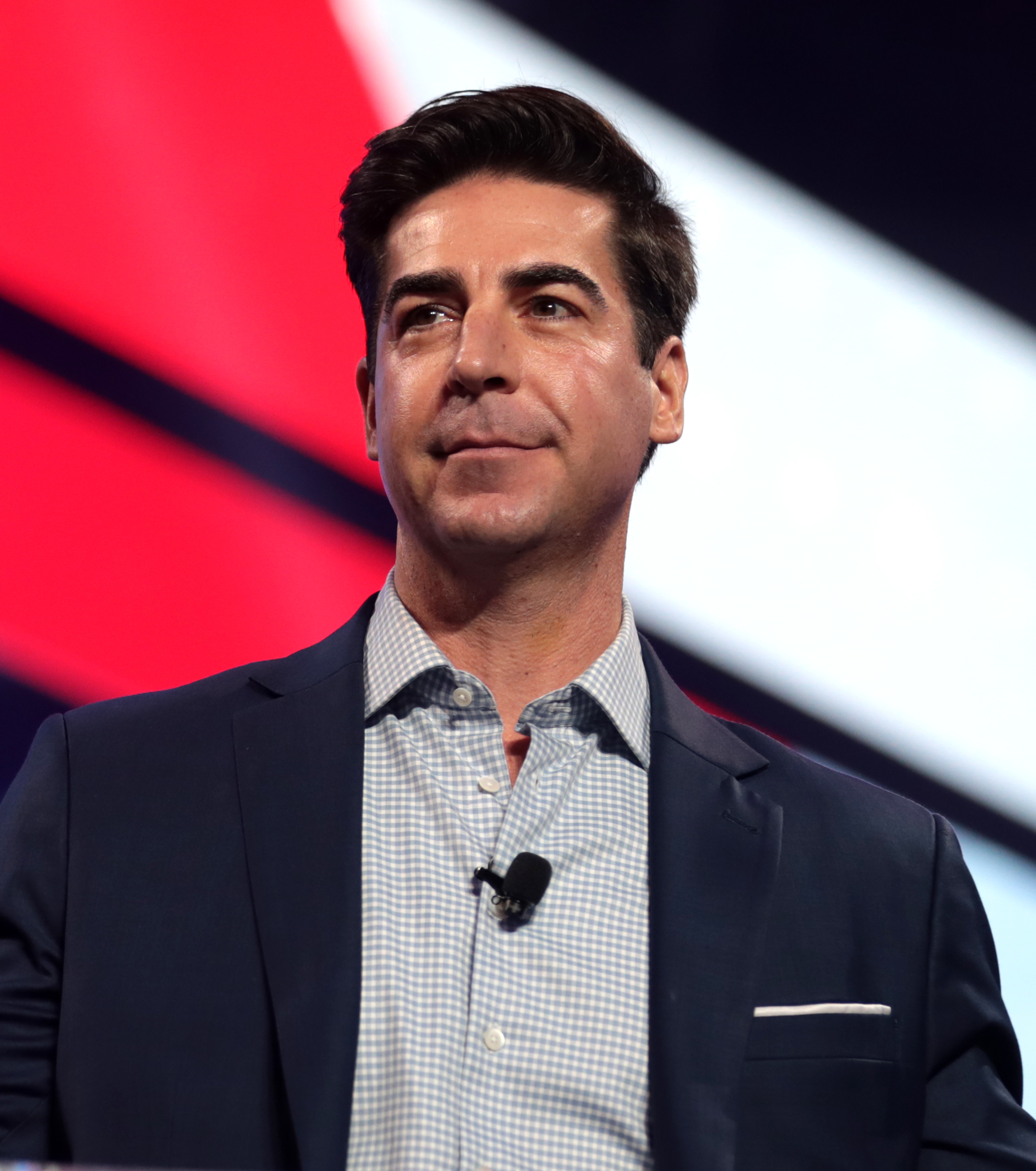
Jesse Watters

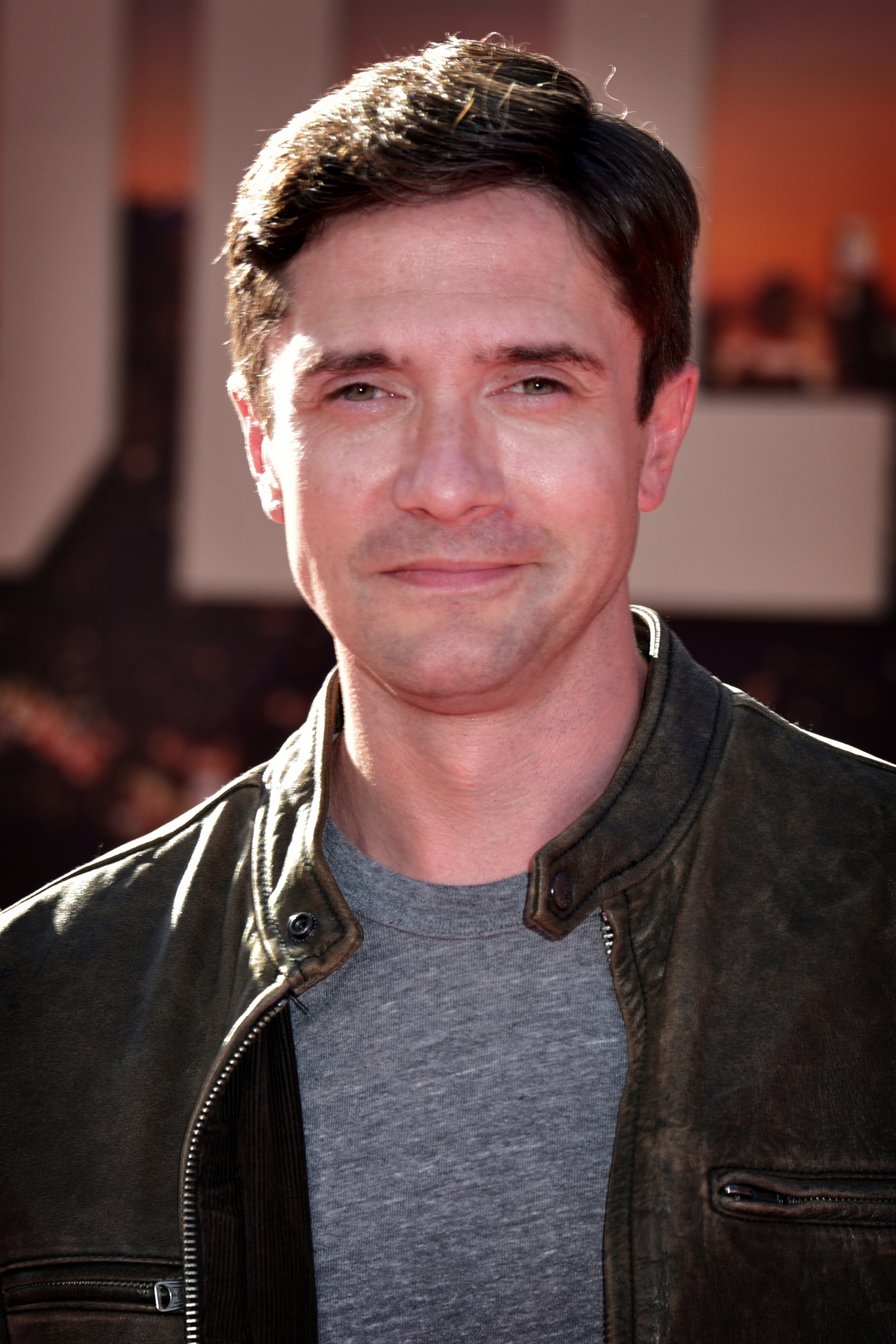
Topher Grace

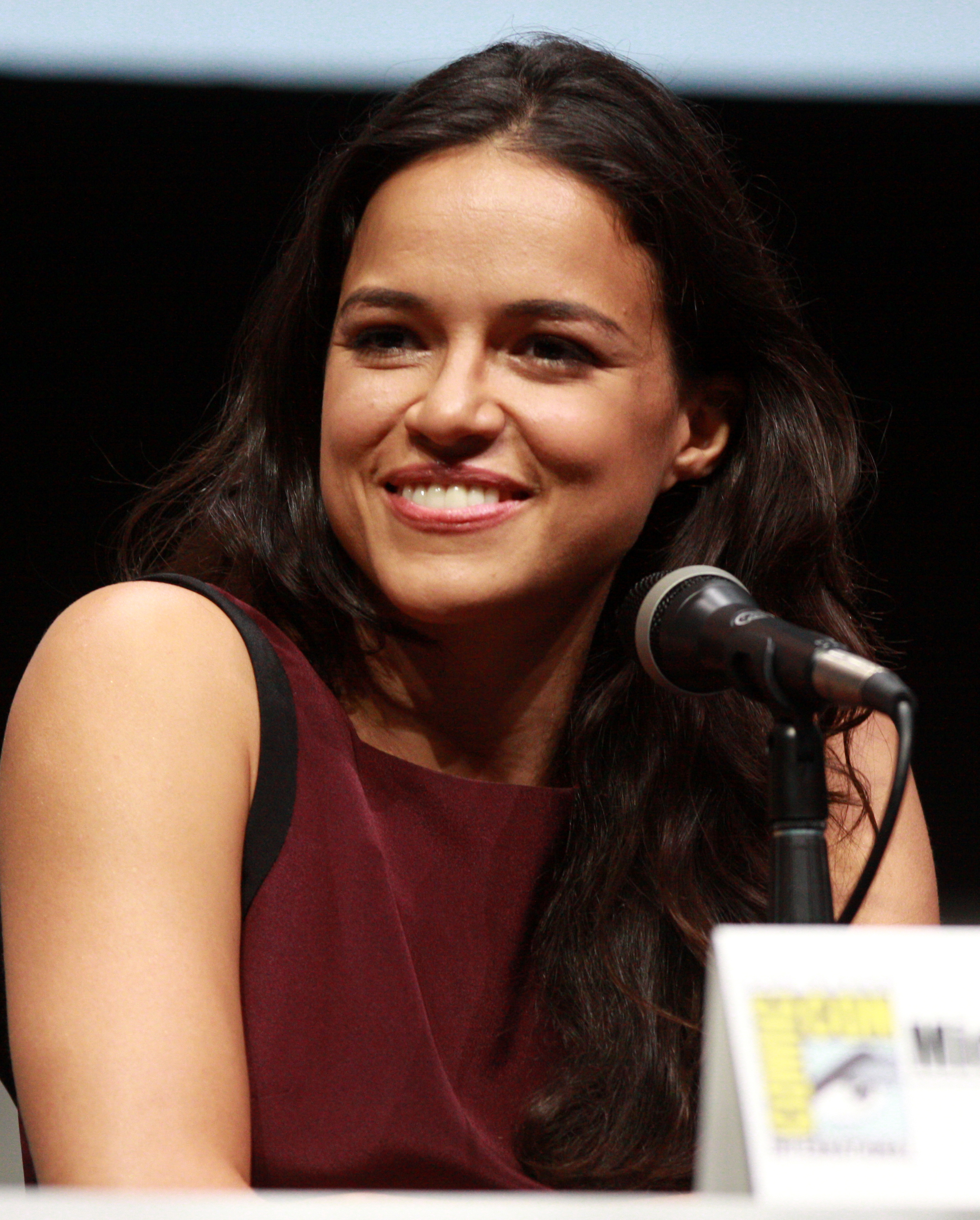
Michelle Rodriguez

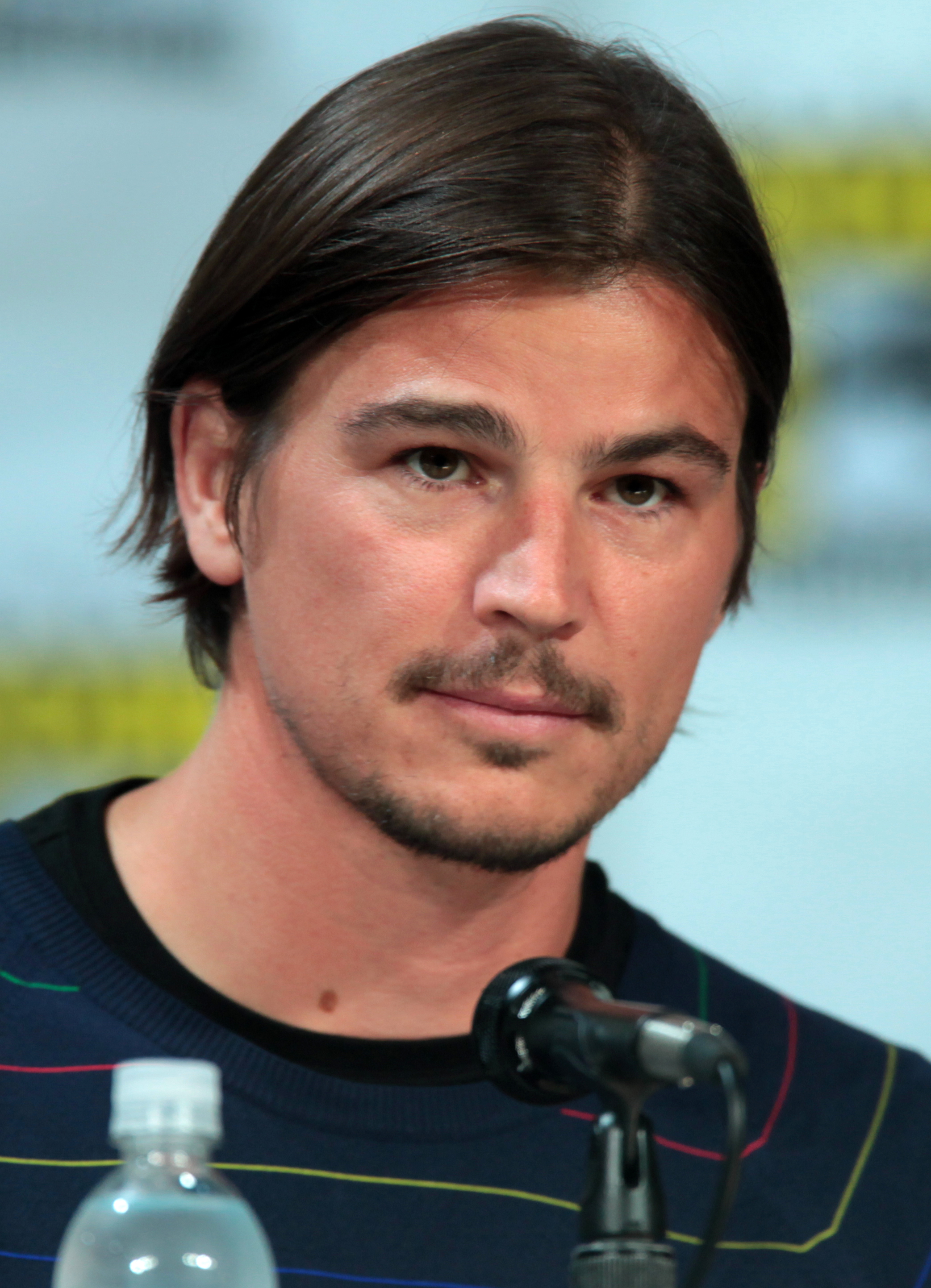
Josh Hartnett

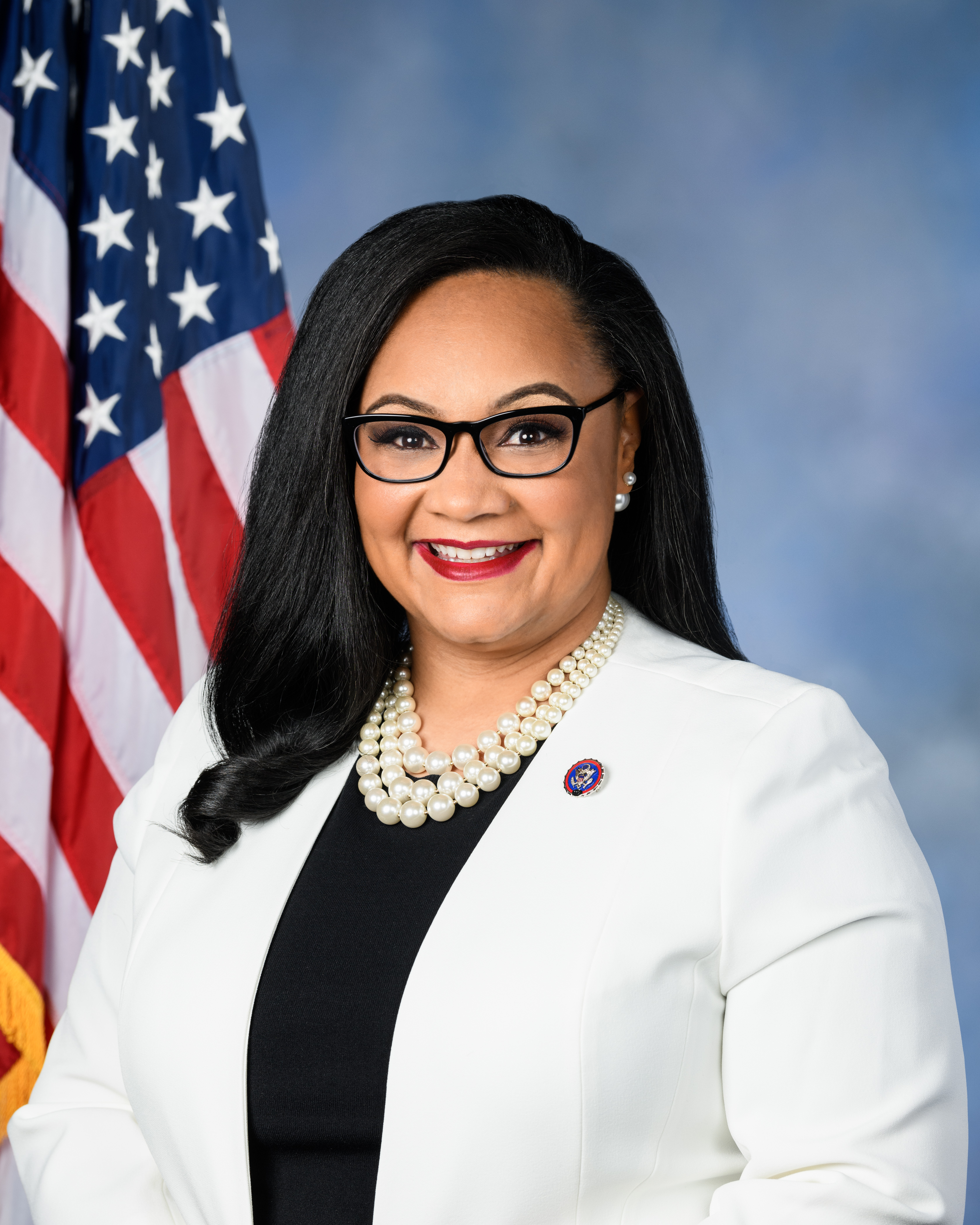
Nikema Williams

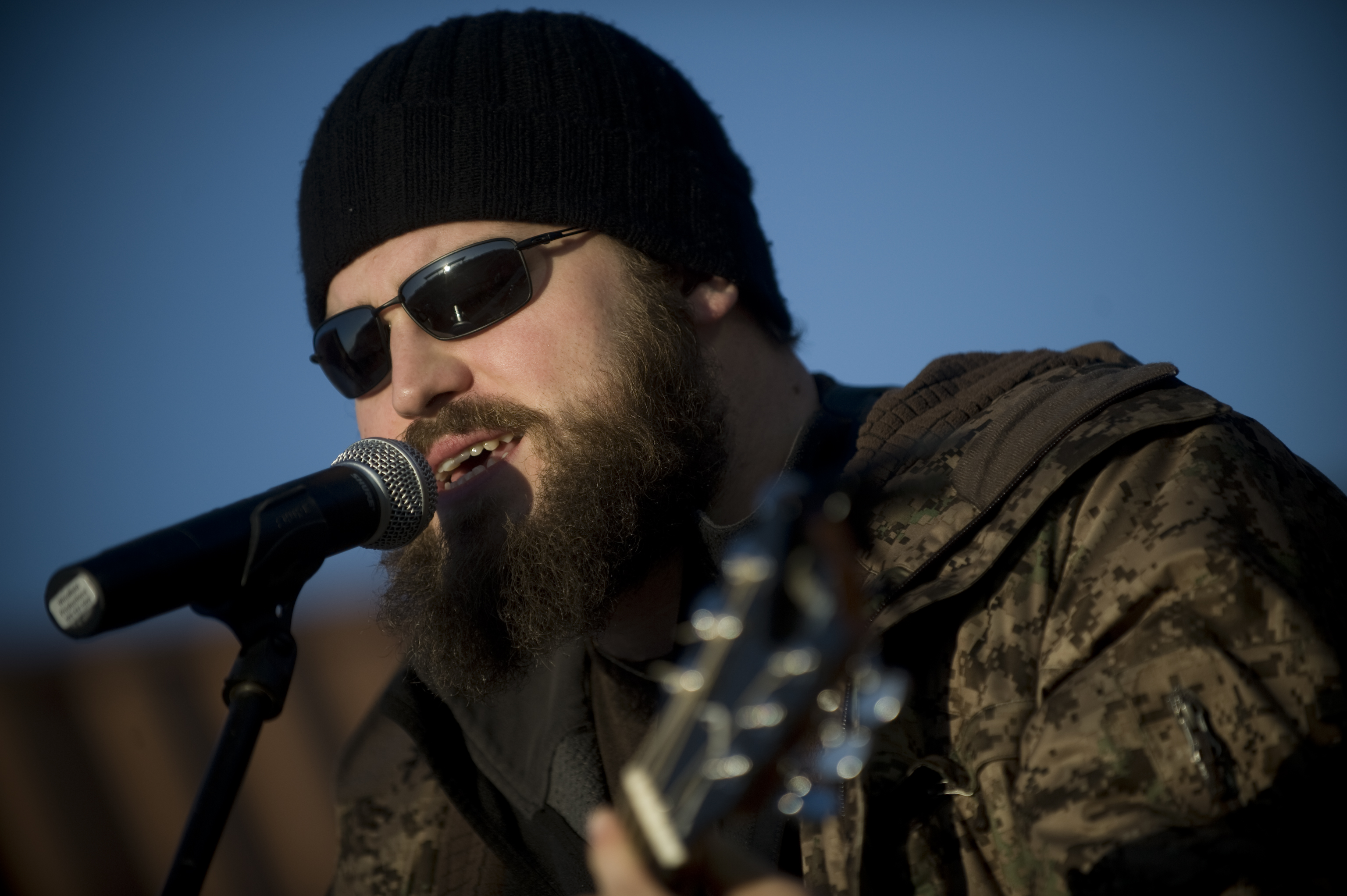
Zac Brown

- July 1
  - Edwina Brown, basketball player
  - Hillary Tuck, actress
- July 2 – Kathryn Sophia Belle, philosopher and professor
- July 3
  - Ian Anthony Dale, actor
  - Jon Anik, mixed martial artist
  - Cornelius Anthony, football player
  - Jesse Leach, singer and frontman for Killswitch Engage
  - Alex Scales, basketball player
- July 4
  - Lanhee Chen, advisor, attorney, and academic
  - Becki Newton, actress
  - Tony Reali, sports personality
- July 6
  - Adam Busch, actor, director, and singer
  - Tia and Tamera Mowry, actresses and twins
- July 7
  - Chris Andersen, basketball player
  - Jesse Ball, novelist and poet
- July 8
  - Jenny Adams, hurdler
  - Rachael Lillis, actress
  - Erin Morgenstern, artist and author
  - Sturgill Simpson, country singer/songwriter
- July 9
  - Kyle Davis, actor
  - Sundance Head, singer
  - Jesse Watters, political commentator and talk show host
- July 10 – Jesse Lacey, singer/songwriter
- July 12
  - Jim Arthur, football coach
  - Topher Grace, actor
  - Michelle Rodriguez, actress
- July 13 – Jessica Barth, actress
- July 14 – Mike Burns, baseball player
- July 15
  - Matt Mitrione, mixed martial artist
  - Greg Sestero, actor, filmmaker, model and author
- July 16 – Brian Bianchini, model and actor (d. 2004)
- July 17
  - Mike Knox, wrestler
  - Panda Bear, musician
  - Mike Pellicciotti, politician
- July 18
  - Crystal Mangum, murderer responsible for making false rape allegations in the Duke lacrosse case
  - Ben Sheets, baseball player
- July 19
  - Mark Proksch, actor and comedian
  - R. J. Williams, media and Internet entrepreneur, and former child actor
- July 20
  - Chris Sligh, singer-songwriter and producer
  - Will Solomon, basketball player
  - Elliott Yamin, singer
- July 21
  - Justin Bartha, actor
  - Beer City Bruiser, wrestler
  - Josh Hartnett, actor
  - Brandon Heath, singer/songwriter
- July 22
  - Ian Allen, football player
  - Candace Kroslak, actress
- July 23 – Lauren Groff, fiction writer
- July 24 – Michael Boireau, football player
- July 25
  - Teresa Benitez-Thompson, politician
  - Elizabeth Ann Bennett, actress
  - Gerard Warren, football player
- July 26 – Major Applewhite, football player and coach
- July 27
  - Matthew Beaton, political figure and business executive
  - Sandra Colton, dancer
- July 28 – Julian Peterson, football player
- July 29 – Mike Adams, baseball player
- July 30
  - Josh Bonifay, baseball player
  - Brian Sicknick, police officer who was killed during the United States Capitol attack (d. 2021)
  - Nikema Williams, politician
- July 31
  - Zac Brown, country singer/songwriter, guitarist, and frontman for Zac Brown Band
  - Nick Sorensen, football player and sportscaster

=== August ===
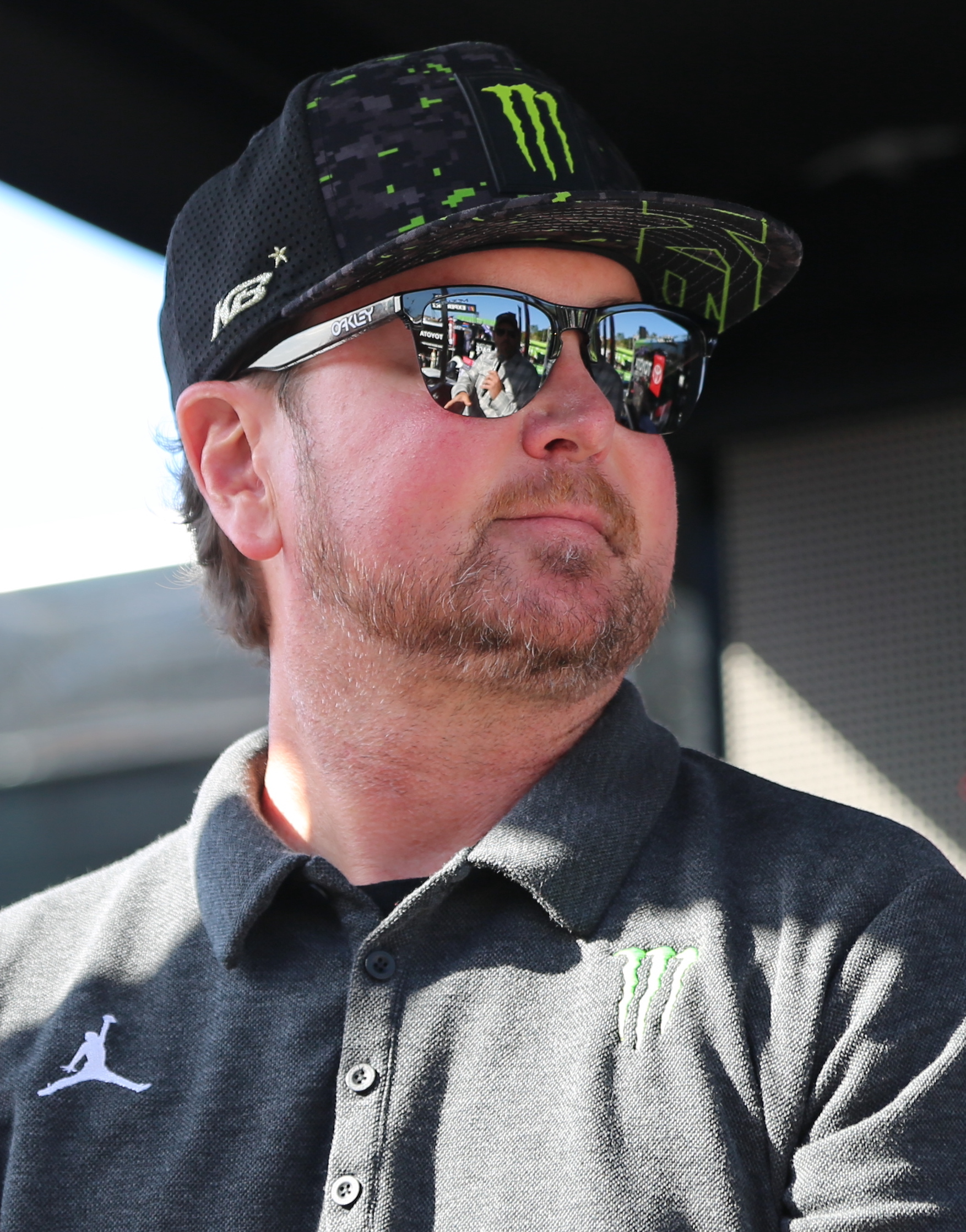
Kurt Busch

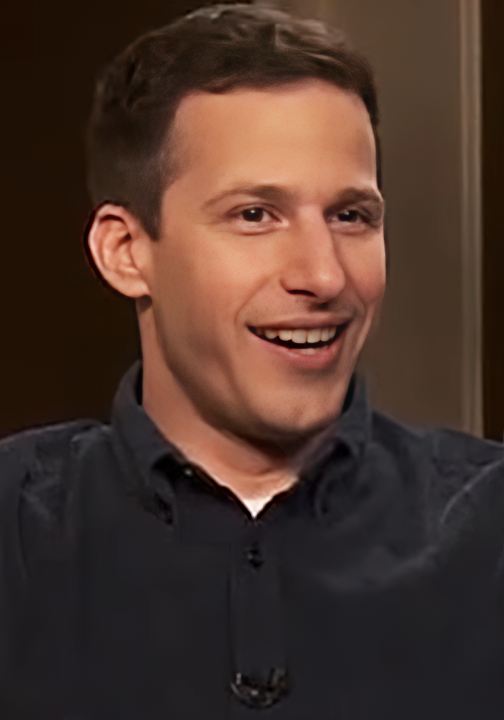
Andy Samberg

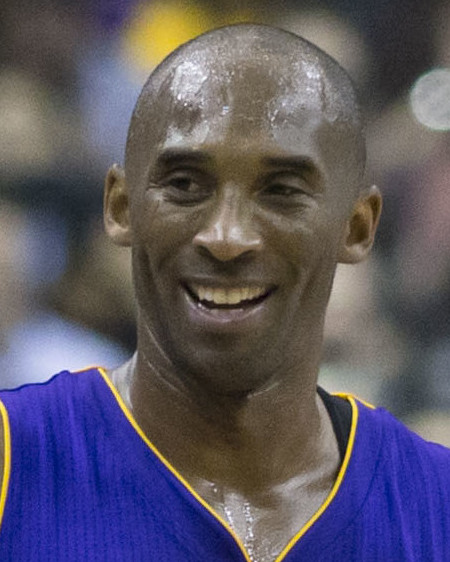
Kobe Bryant

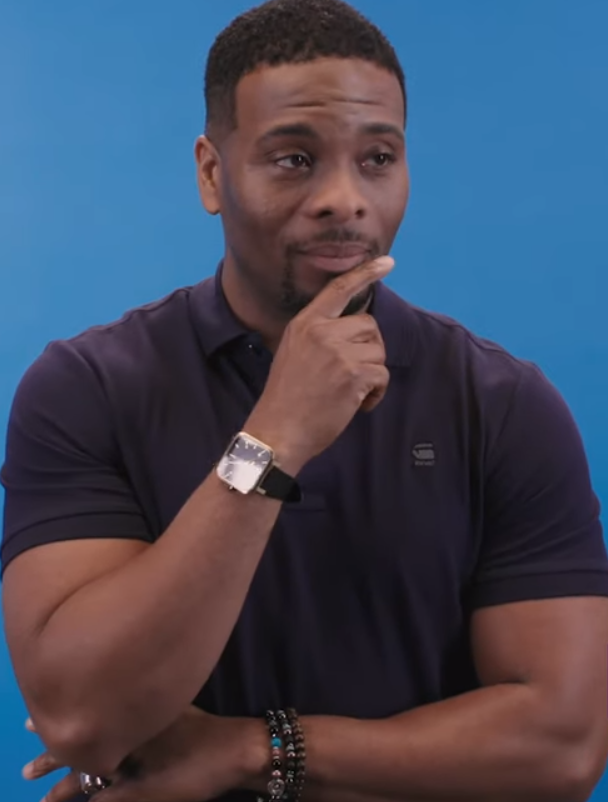
Kel Mitchell

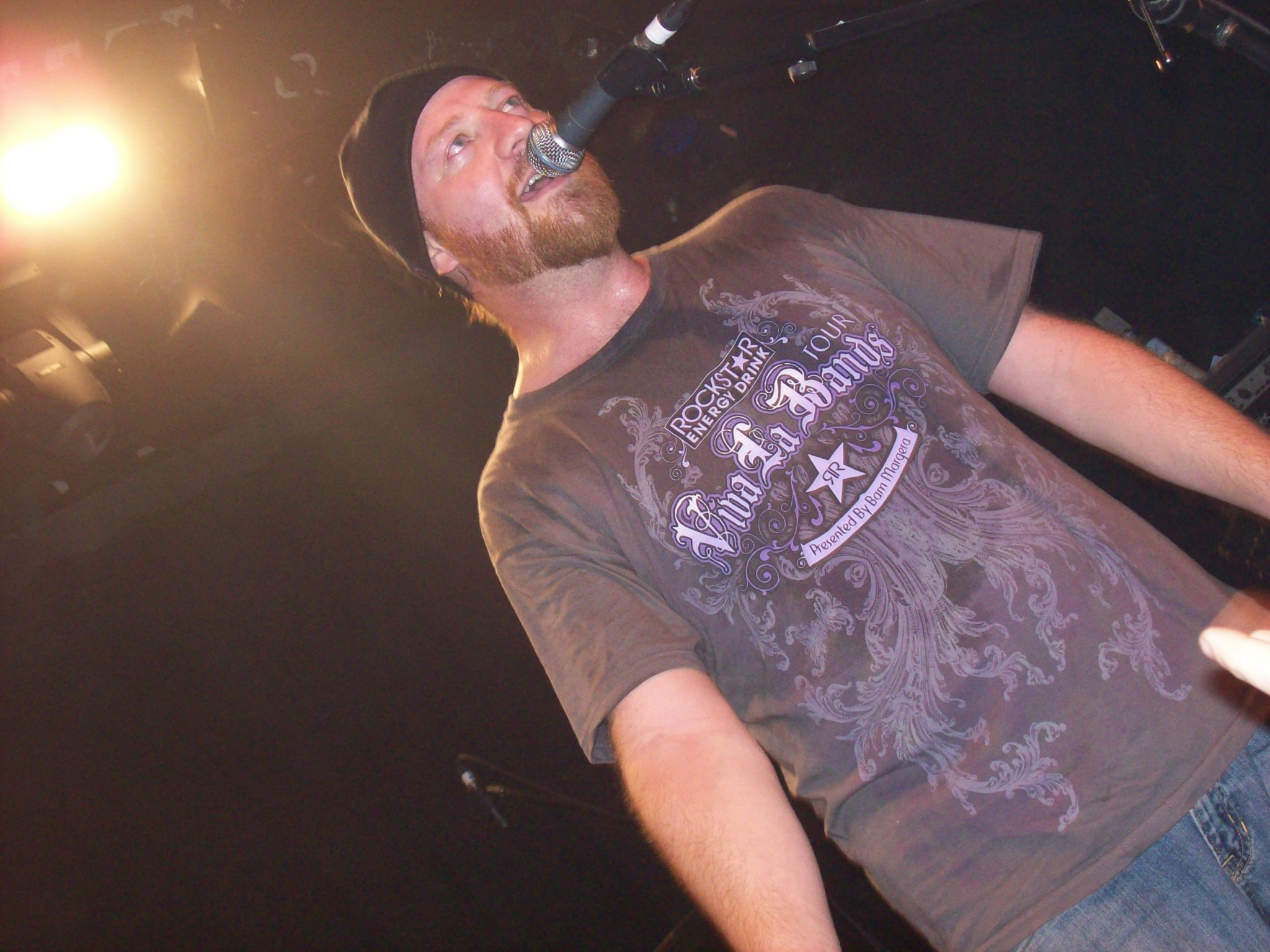
Jess Margera

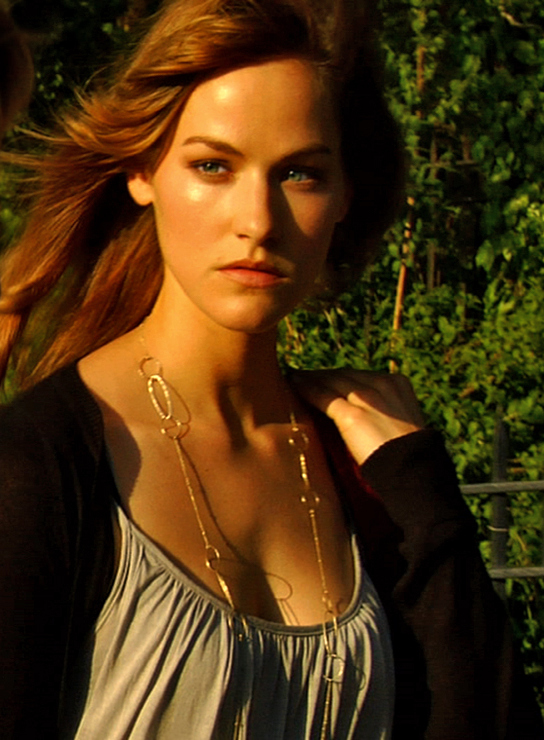
Kelly Overton

- August 2 – Ty O'Neal, actor
- August 3 – Shanelle Workman, actress
- August 4
  - Luke Allen, baseball player (d. 2022)
  - Michael Brown, producer and filmmaker
  - Kurt Busch, stock car racing driver
- August 5
  - Will Allen, football player
  - Bryan Bracey, basketball player
  - Nick Bradford, basketball player
  - Henry Buchanan, boxer
- August 6
  - Marisa Miller, supermodel
  - Freeway, rapper
- August 8
  - Kurt Anderson, football player and coach
  - Countess Vaughn, actress
- August 10
  - Cory Bird, football player
  - Jesse Boulerice, ice hockey player
- August 11 – Chris Kelly, rapper, "Mac Daddy" of the hip-hop duo Kris Kross (d. 2013)
- August 12
  - Pazuzu Algarad, Satanist and convicted murderer (d. 2015)
  - Derrick Burgess, football player
- August 13 – Michael Bennett, football player
- August 15
  - Jennie Eisenhower, actress
  - Kerri Walsh Jennings, beach volleyball player
- August 17 – Alexandr Kirsanov, Russian-born Azerbaijani-American ice skater (d. 2025)
- August 18
  - Kevin Barry, baseball player
  - Jaclyn Bernstein, actress
  - Andy Samberg, actor
- August 19
  - David Boston, football player
  - Chris Capuano, baseball player
- August 20
  - Noah Bean, actor
  - Monty Beisel, football player
  - Freddie Bruno, Christian hip hop musician
- August 21 – Reuben Droughns, football player
- August 23
  - Kenny Bartram, freestyle motocross rider
  - Kobe Bryant, basketball player (d. 2020)
  - Julian Casablancas, singer/songwriter and musician
- August 24 – Beth Riesgraf, actress
- August 25 – Kel Mitchell, actor
- August 26
  - Ben Archibald, football player
  - Drew Bennett, football player
  - Patrick Brown, engineer, producer, and studio owner
  - Cedric Burnside, blues musician
  - Julian Casablancas, singer/songwriter and musician
  - Amanda Schull, actress and ballerina
- August 27 – Shaun Weiss, actor and comedian
- August 28
  - Max Collins, singer/songwriter, frontman and bassist for Eve 6
  - Rachel Kimsey, actress
  - Jess Margera, drummer for CKY
  - Kelly Overton, actress
- August 30
  - Rodregis Brooks, football player
  - Cliff Lee, baseball player
- August 31 – Adam Laxalt, politician

=== September ===
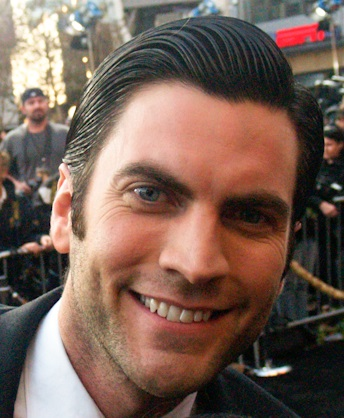
Wes Bentley

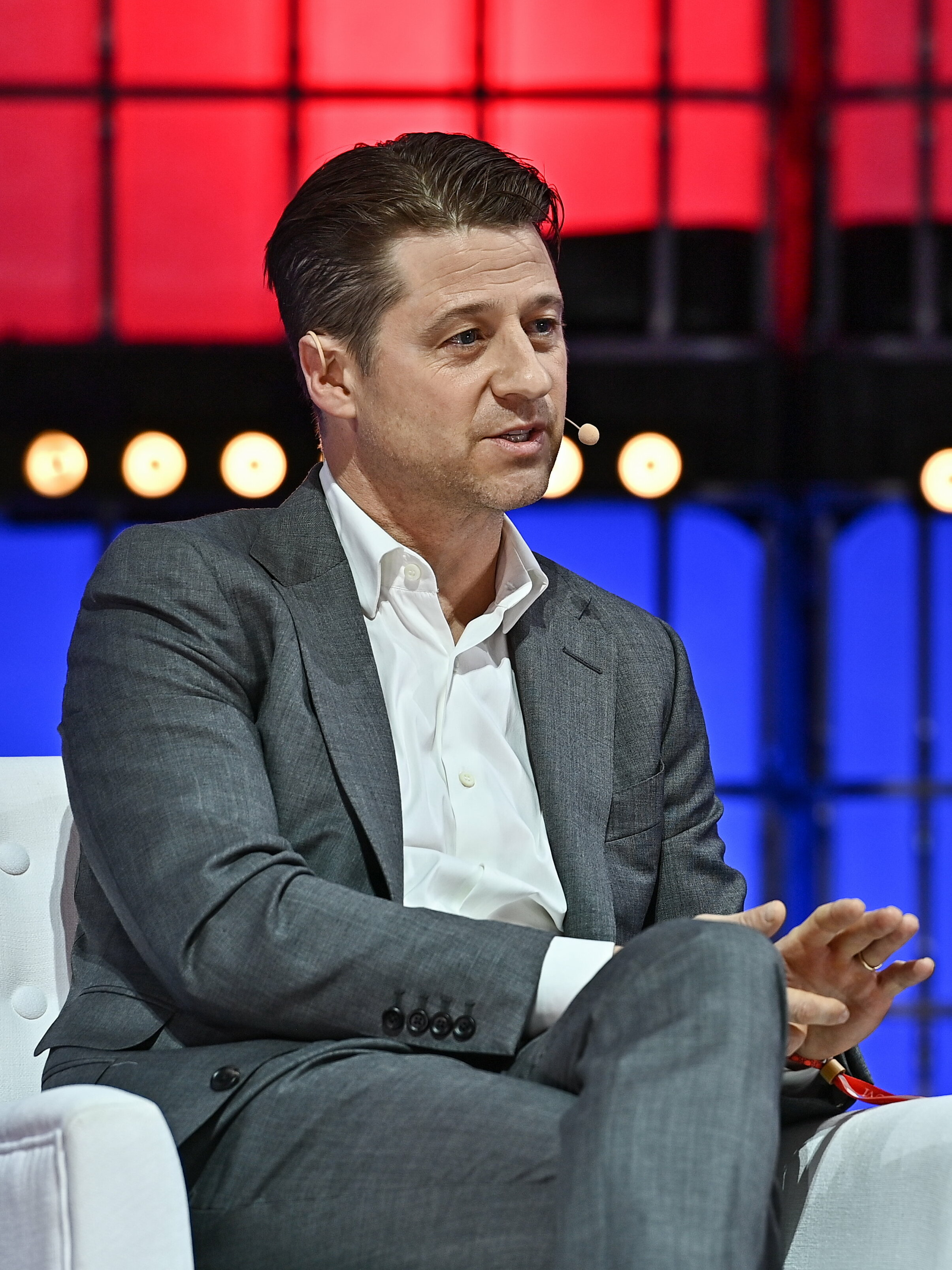
Ben McKenzie

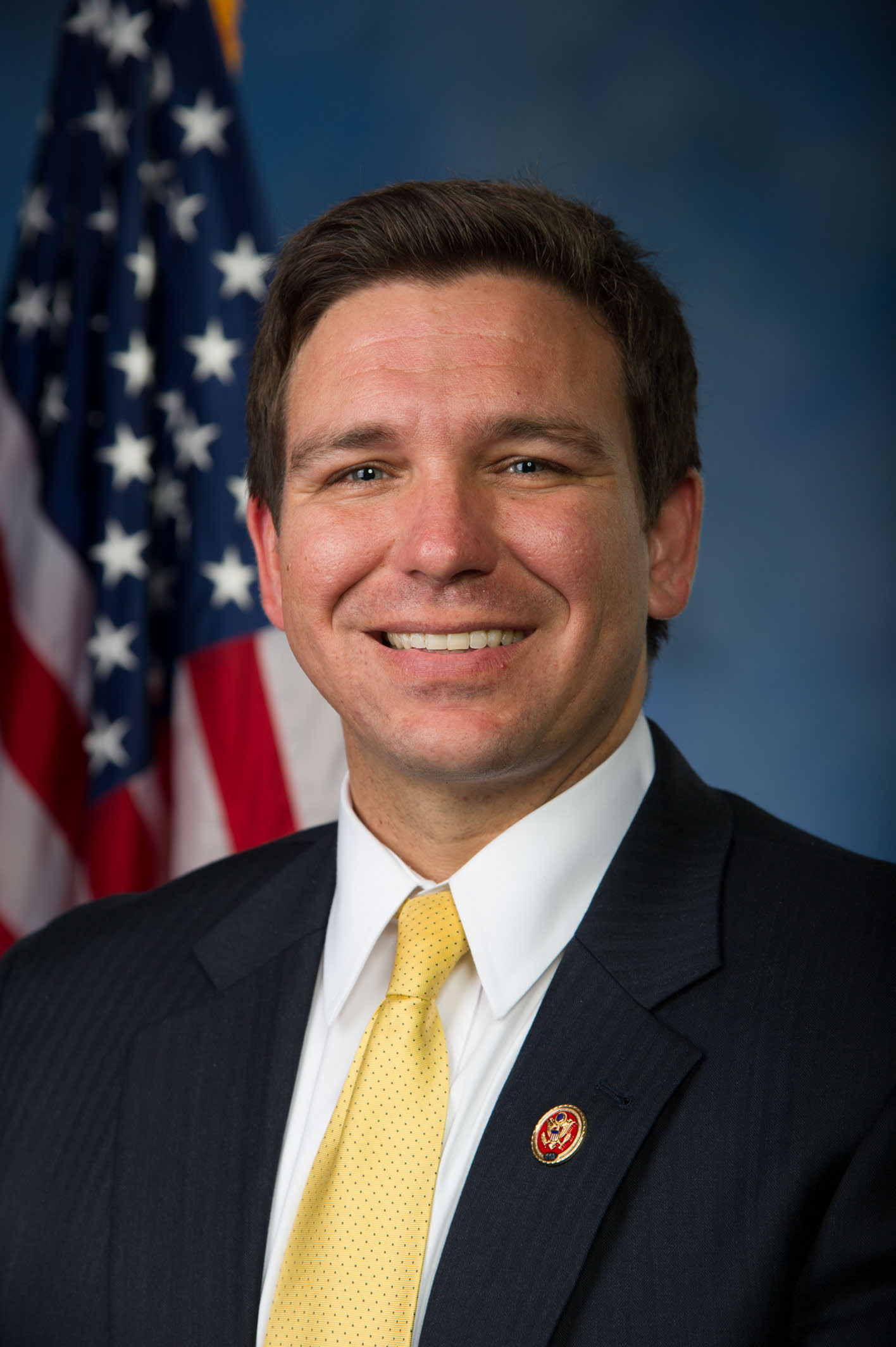
Ron DeSantis

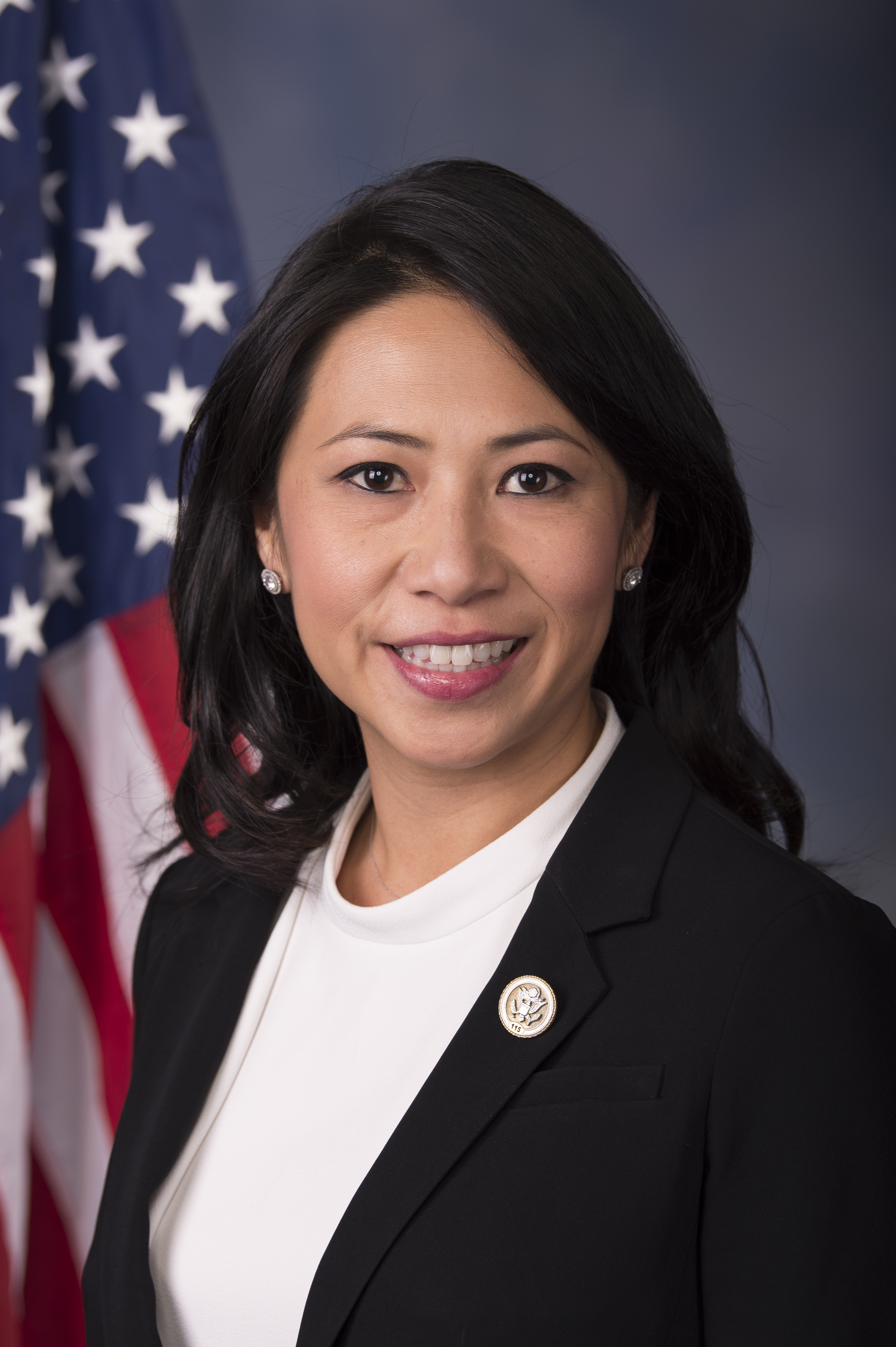
Stephanie Murphy

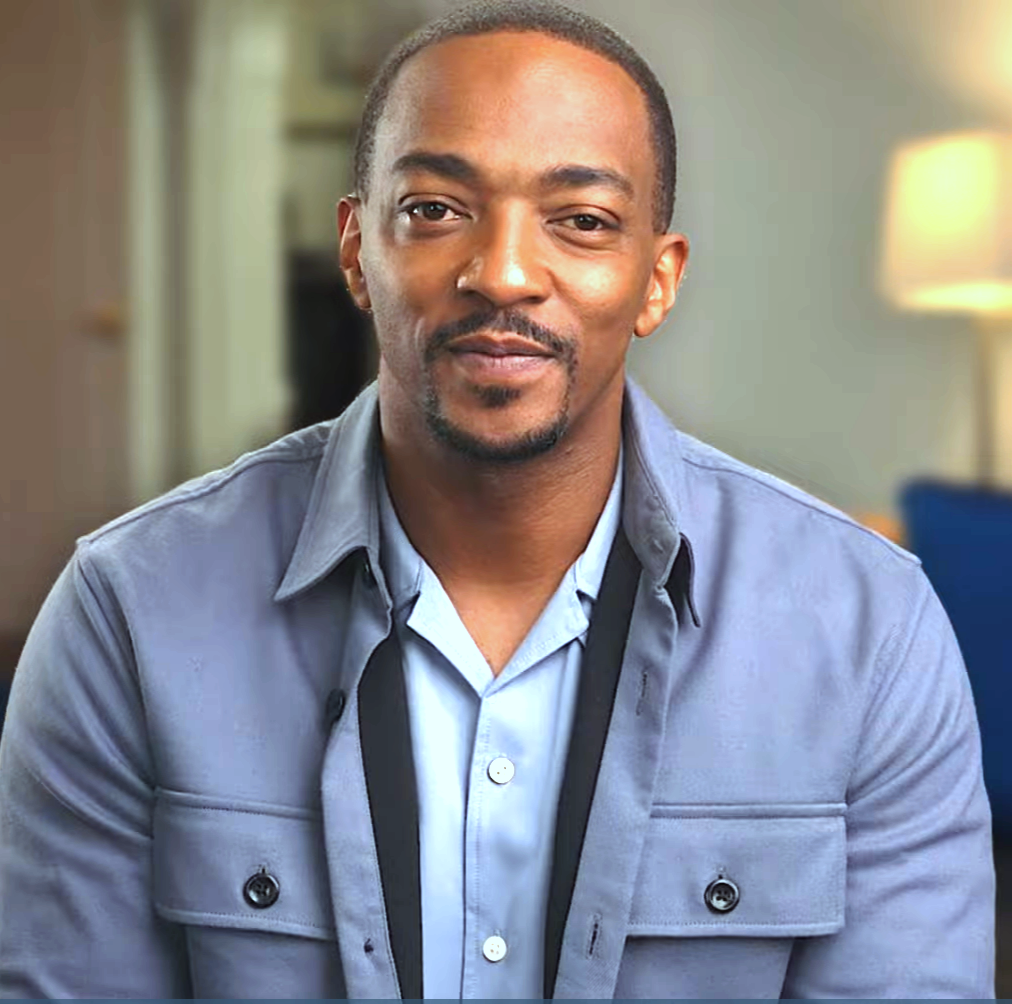
Anthony Mackie

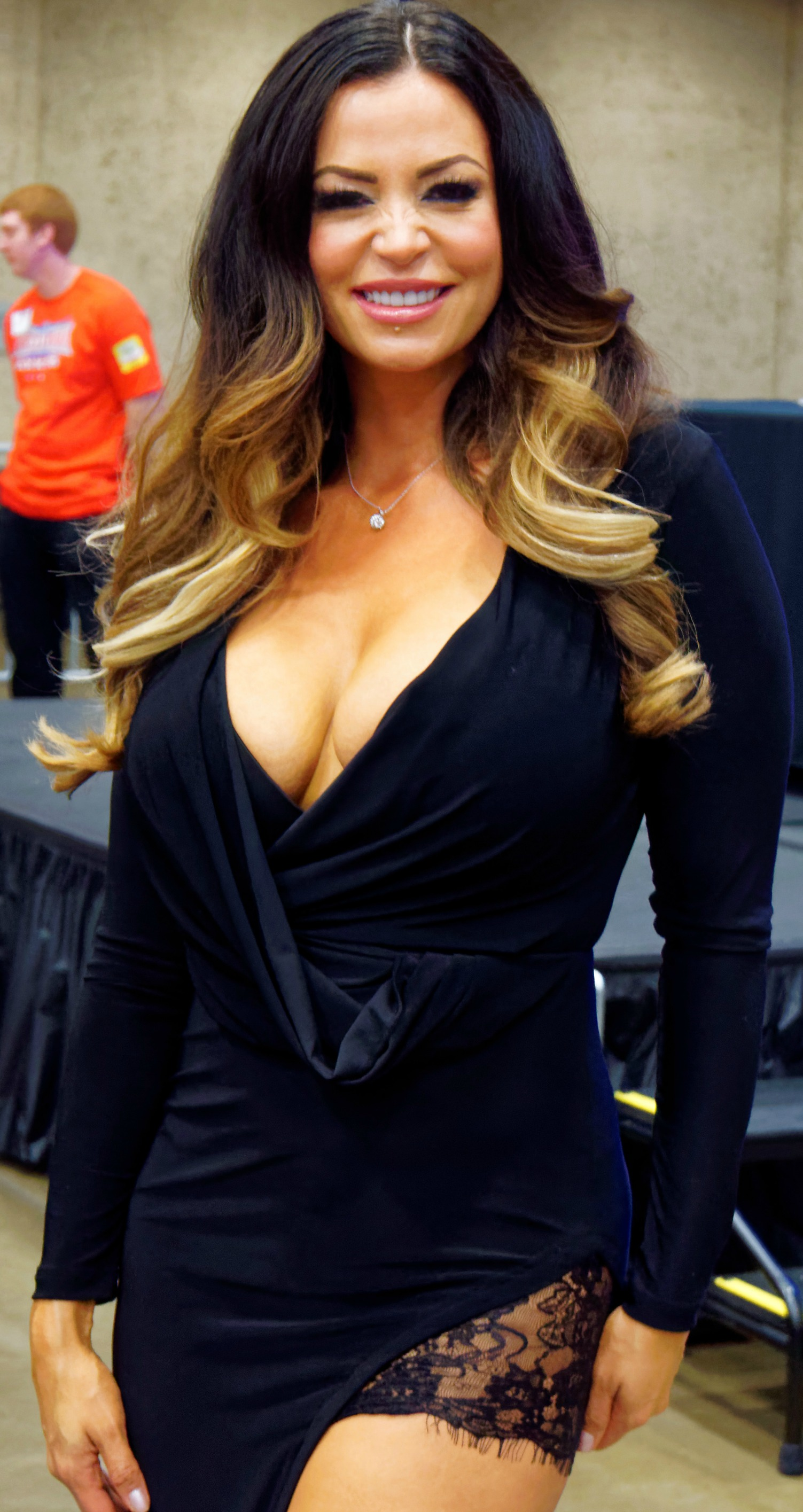
Candice Michelle

- September 1 – Jessie Hoffman Jr., convicted murderer (executed 2025)
- September 2 – Courtland Bullard, football player
- September 4
  - Lamont Barnes, basketball player
  - Wes Bentley, actor
- September 6
  - Cisco Adler, musician and record producer
  - Frank Brooks, baseball player
  - Adrienne Maree Brown, writer, activist, and facilitator
  - Foxy Brown, rapper
  - Natalia Cigliuti, actress
- September 7 – Sarah E. Buxton, politician
- September 8 – Steve Barnett, politician
- September 9
  - Kurt Ainsworth, baseball player
  - Shane Battier, basketball player
  - Rod Brown, basketball player
- September 10 – Russ Buller, pole vaulter
- September 11 – Ed Reed, football player
- September 12
  - Tess Brunet, musician and producer
  - Ben McKenzie, actor
  - Ruben Studdard, singer and American Idol winner
- September 13
  - Marlyne Barrett, actress
  - Swizz Beatz, record producer and rapper
  - Bryan Bishop, radio personality
  - Megan Henning, actress
- September 14
  - Kenderick Allen, football player
  - Bruce Branch, football player
  - Ron DeSantis, politician, 46th Governor of Florida
  - Teddy Park, rapper and member of 1TYM
- September 15 – Charles Grigsby, singer
- September 16
  - Mike Battle, digital restoration artist and animation color modelist
  - Jarvis Borum, football player
  - Ralph Brown, football player
  - Stephanie Murphy, Vietnamese-born politician
  - Matthew Rogers, singer and TV host
  - Brian Sims, politician
- September 17 – Karen Akunowicz, chef, cookbook author, and television personality
- September 18 – Billy Eichner, actor and comedian
- September 20 – Jason Bay, Canadian-born baseball player
- September 21 – Josh Thomson, mixed martial artist
- September 22 – Bill Ferrario, football player (d. 2025)
- September 23
  - Anthony Mackie, actor
  - Worm Miller, screenwriter, director and, actor
  - Keri Lynn Pratt, actress
- September 24 – Chris Bala, ice hockey player
- September 25
  - Bob Abrahamian, deejay (d. 2014)
  - Danny Basavich, pool player (d. 2023)
  - Joe Miñoso, actor
- September 26
  - Kara Medoff Barnett, business executive and arts administrator, executive director of the American Ballet Theatre
  - Bill Heck, actor
- September 27
  - Andrea Alù, Italian-born scientist and engineer
  - Brad Arnold, singer, drummer, and frontman for 3 Doors Down (d. 2026)
  - Kole Ayi, football player
- September 28
  - Jarin Blaschke, cinematographer
  - Dane Boedigheimer, internet personality
  - Lucas Bryant, Canadian-born actor
  - Nikki McKibbin, singer (d. 2020)
- September 29 – Mohini Bhardwaj, Olympic artistic gymnast
- September 30 – Candice Michelle, wrestler and model

=== October ===
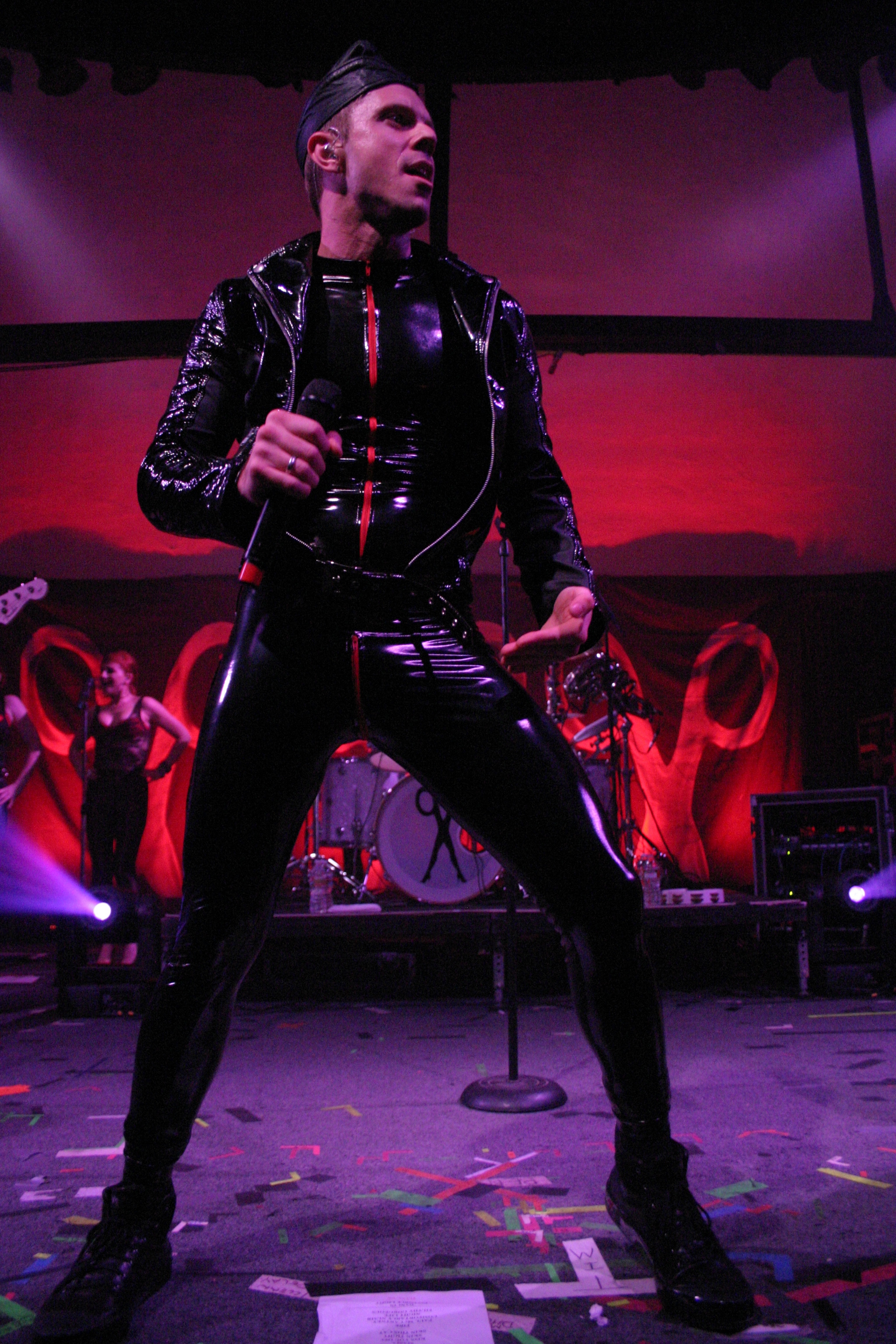
Jake Shears

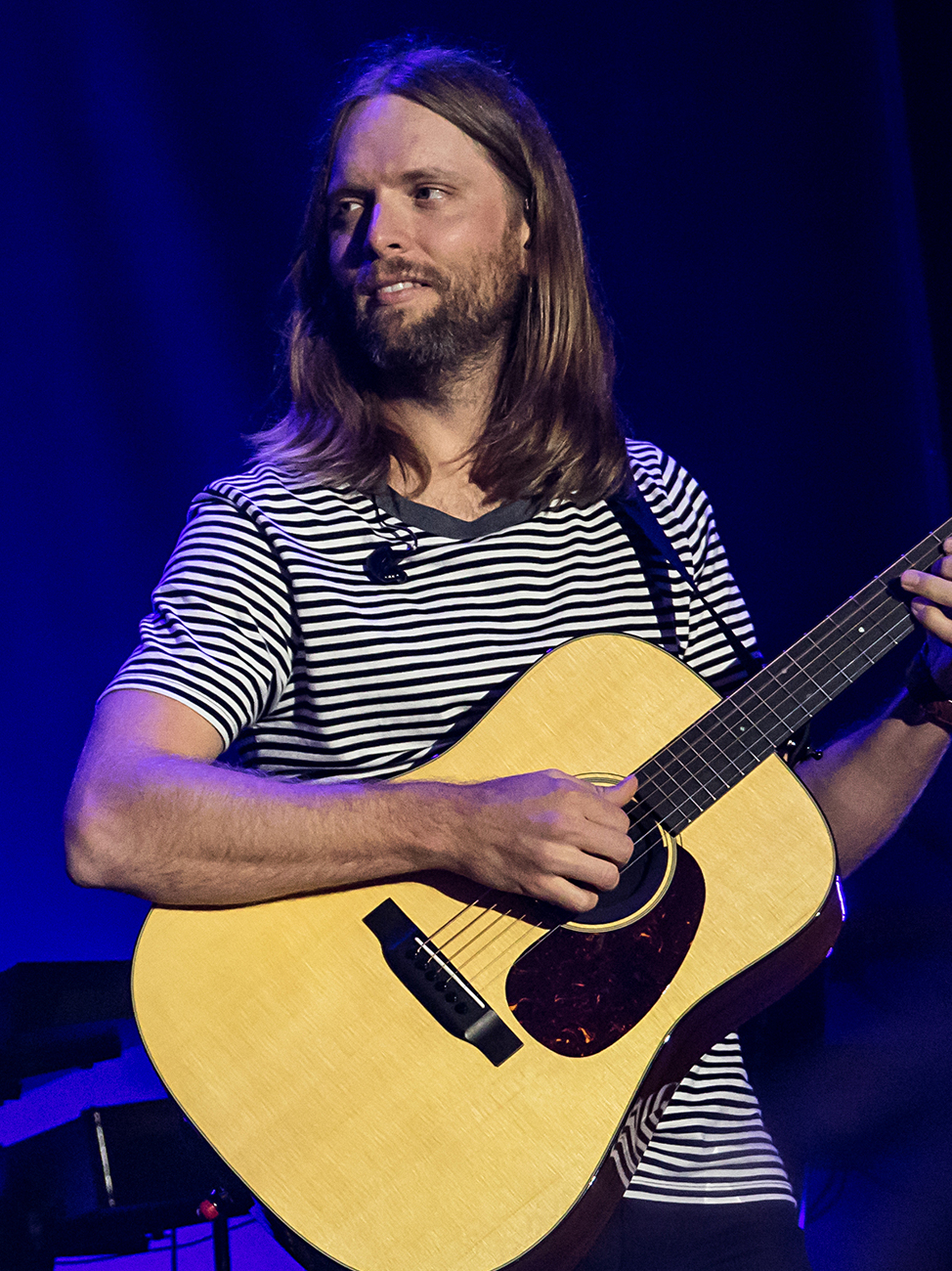
James Valentine

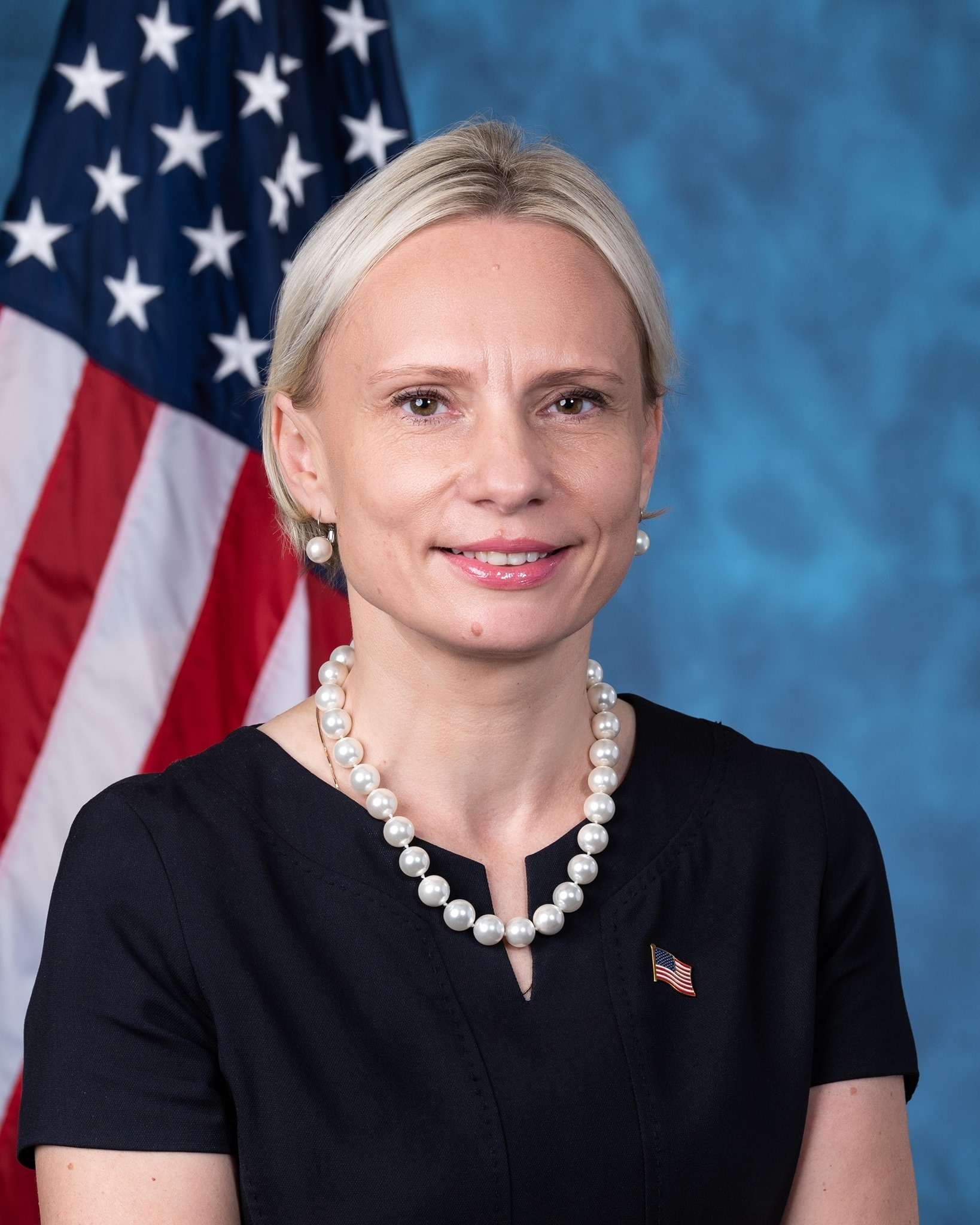
Victoria Spartz

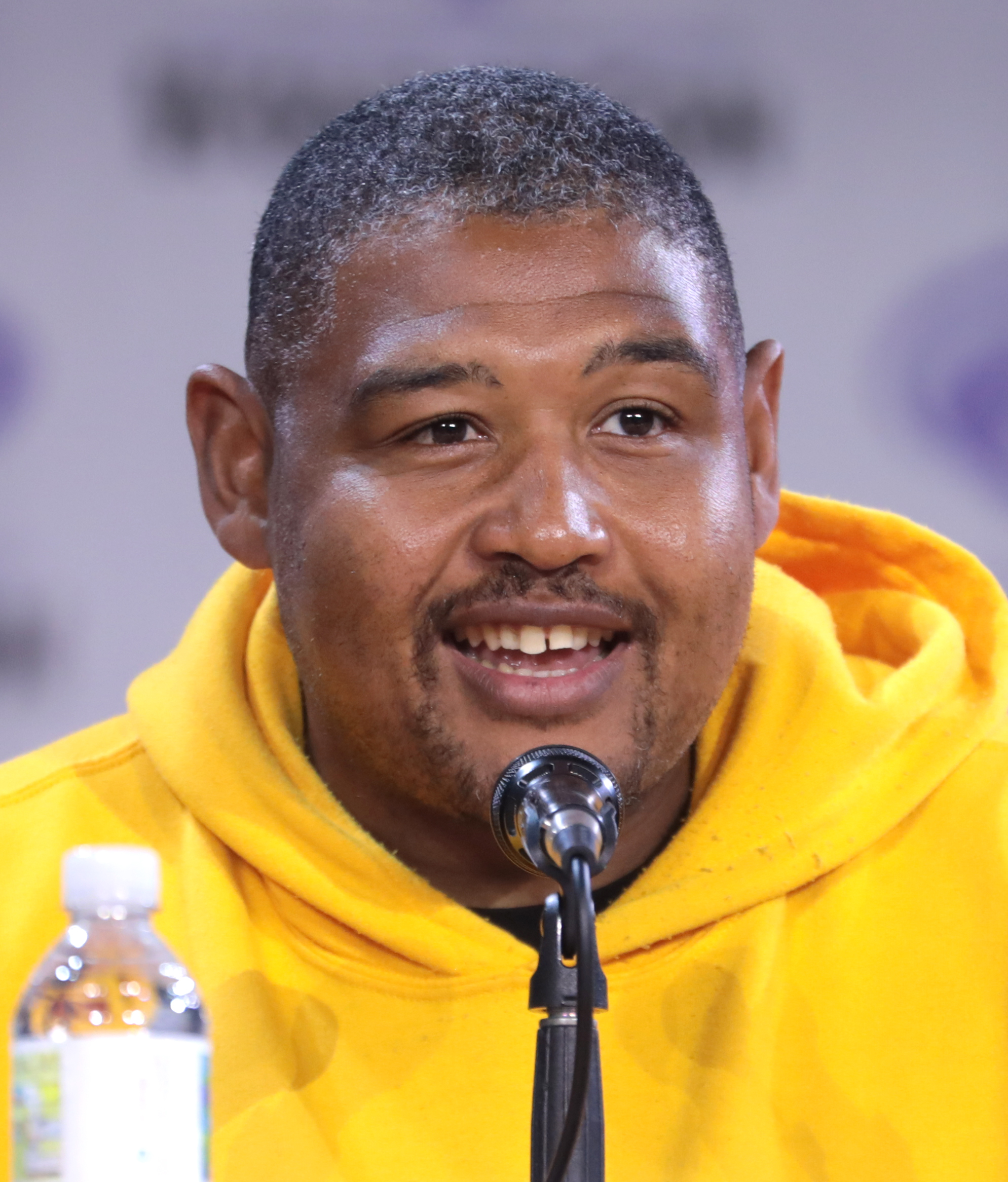
Omar Benson Miller

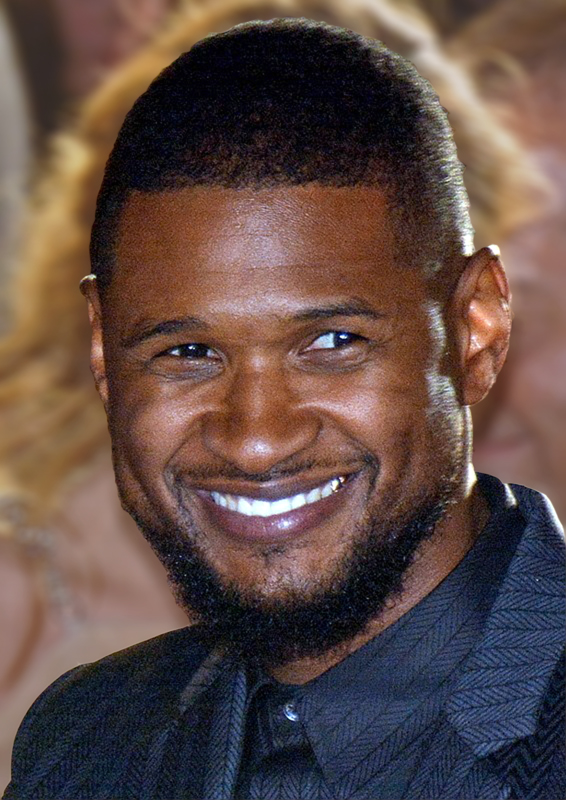
Usher

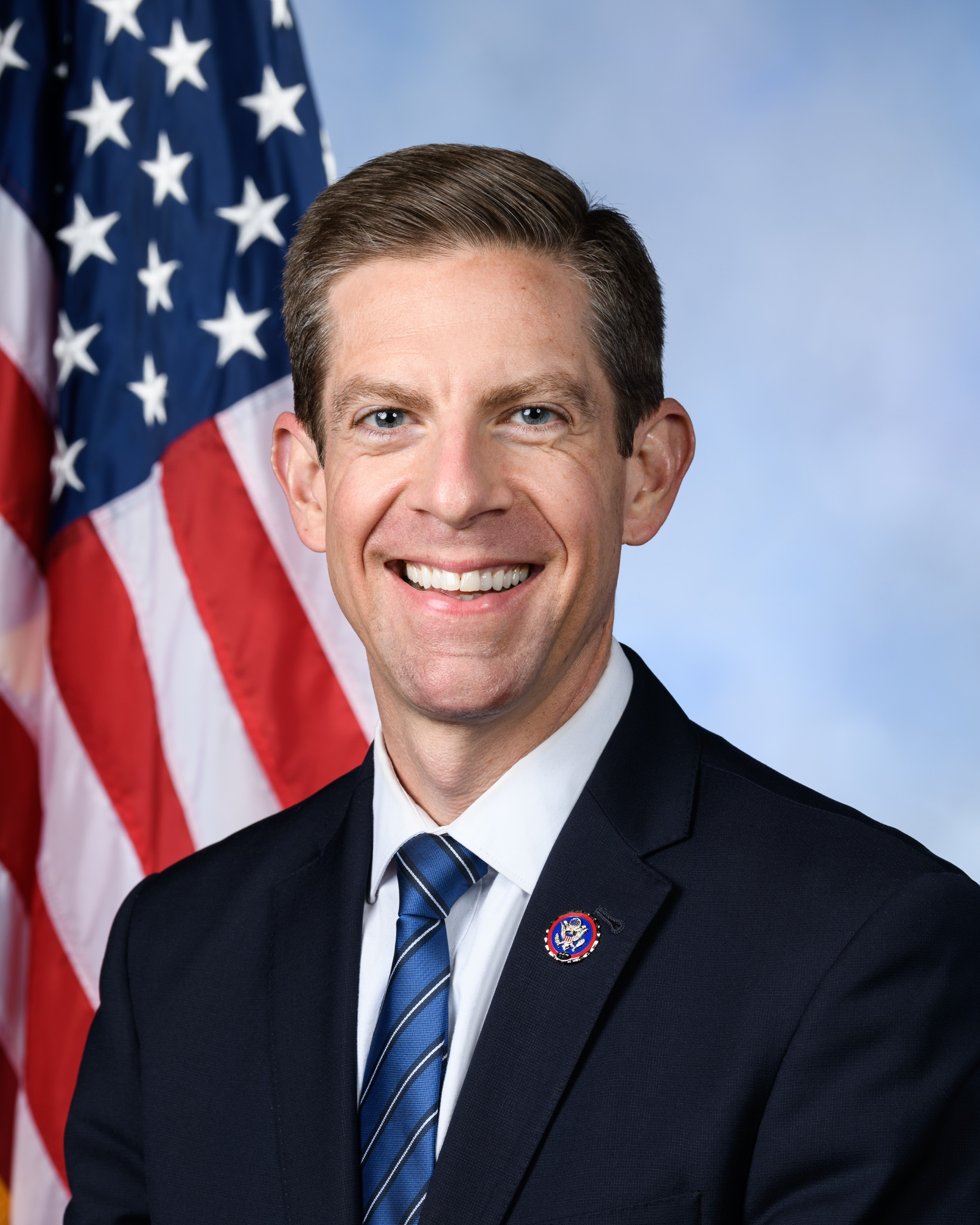
Mike Levin

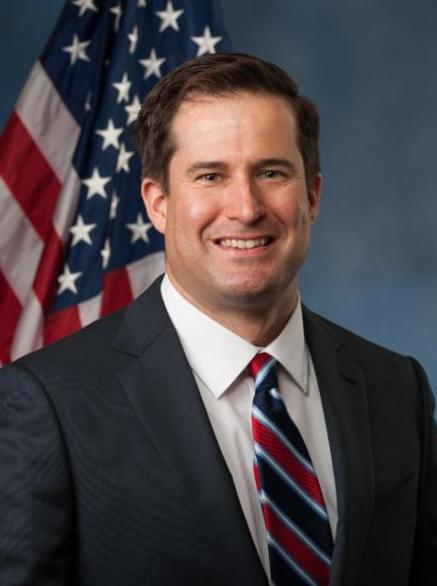
Seth Moulton

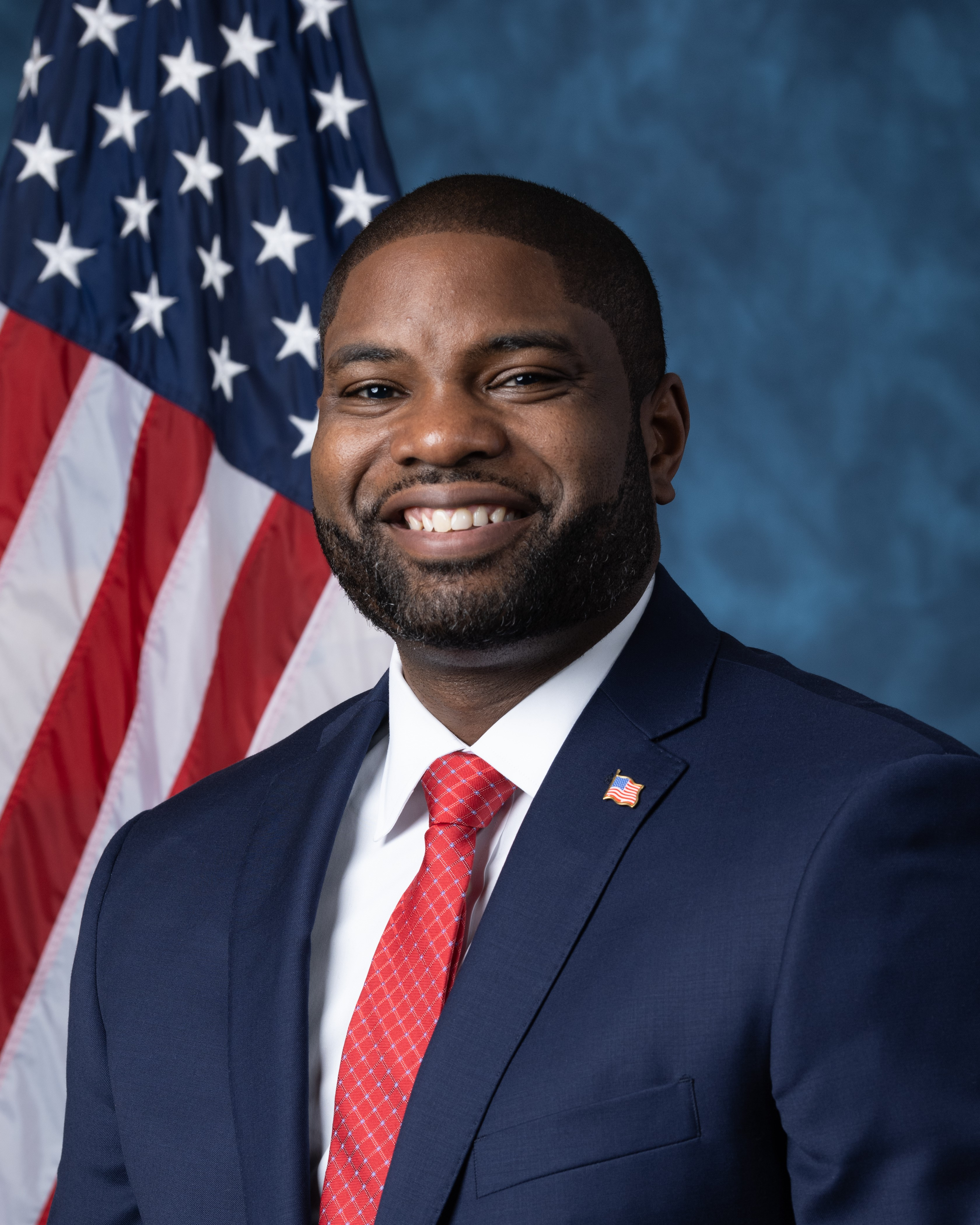
Byron Donalds

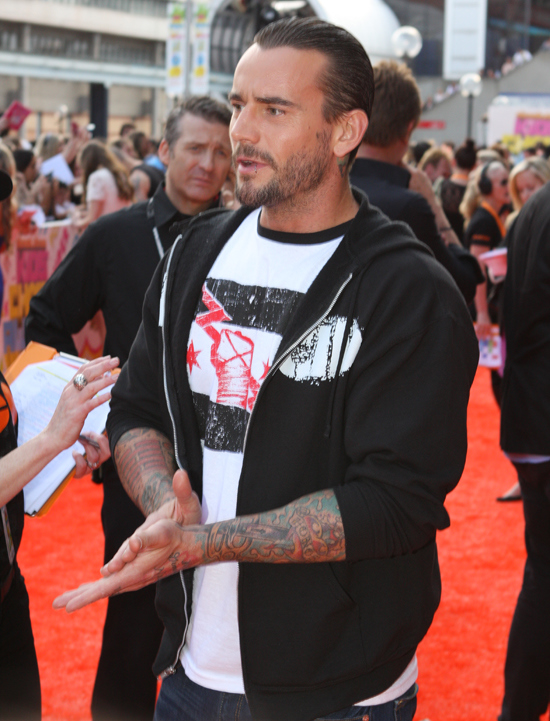
CM Punk

- October 1
  - Katie Aselton, actress
  - Nicole Atkins, singer/songwriter
  - Will Bartholomew, football player
  - Tony Beckham, football player
  - Leticia Cline, journalist and model
- October 2 – Deanna Ballard, politician
- October 3
  - Jarrett Bellini, writer and journalist
  - Jake Shears, singer/songwriter
  - Shannyn Sossamon, actress
- October 4
  - Dana Davis, actress
  - Phillip Glasser, actor and producer
- October 5
  - Lindsey Pearlman, actress (d. 2022)
  - James Valentine, pop rock guitarist for Maroon 5
- October 6
  - Sarah Brusco, Christian musician
  - Correll Buckhalter, football player
  - Caleb Scofield, singer, bassist, and frontman for Cave In (d. 2018)
  - Victoria Spartz, Ukrainian-born politician
- October 7 – Omar Benson Miller, actor
- October 9
  - Ben Diamond, politician
  - Kristy Kowal, Olympic swimmer
- October 10
  - Brandon Barnes, drummer for Rise Against
  - Dan Bellino, MLB umpire
  - Casey Benjamin, saxophonist, vocoderist, keyboardist, producer, and songwriter
- October 11
  - Damian Adams, wrestler
  - Carl Bussey, soccer player
  - Wes Chatham, actor
- October 14
  - Justin Brannan, politician and musician
  - Ryan Church, baseball player
  - Usher Raymond, R&B singer-songwriter
  - Javon Walker, football player
- October 15 – Wes Moore, author, entrepreneur, television producer, and Army veteran
- October 18
  - Brian Brown, dirt track racing driver
  - Jake Farrow, television writer and actor
  - Wesley Jonathan, actor
- October 20
  - David Caspe, writer, producer, and director
  - Brooke Ellison, academic and disability rights activist (d. 2024)
  - Mike Levin, politician
  - Dionne Quan, voice actress
- October 21
  - Will Estes, actor
  - Joey Harrington, football player
  - Michael McMillian, actor and writer
- October 23
  - Bo Biteman, politician
  - John Lackey, baseball player
- October 24
  - Kylie Bivens, soccer player
  - Chris Bootcheck, baseball player
  - Seth Moulton, politician
- October 25
  - Zachary Knighton, actor
  - David T. Little, composer and drummer
- October 26
  - Tyondai Braxton, composer and musician
  - Byron Donalds, politician
  - CM Punk, wrestler and martial artist
  - Antonio Pierce, football player
- October 27
  - Stephanie Abrams, meteorologist
  - Andrew Bell, British-born artist and founder of Dead Zebra Inc.
  - Dusty Bonner, football player
  - David Walton, actor
- October 28
  - Rebecca Bauer-Kahan, politician
  - Byron Donalds, politician
  - Justin Guarini, singer and American Idol contestant
- October 29 – Travis Henry, football player
- October 30 – Matthew Morrison, actor, dancer, and singer
- October 31 – Brian Hallisay, actor

=== November ===
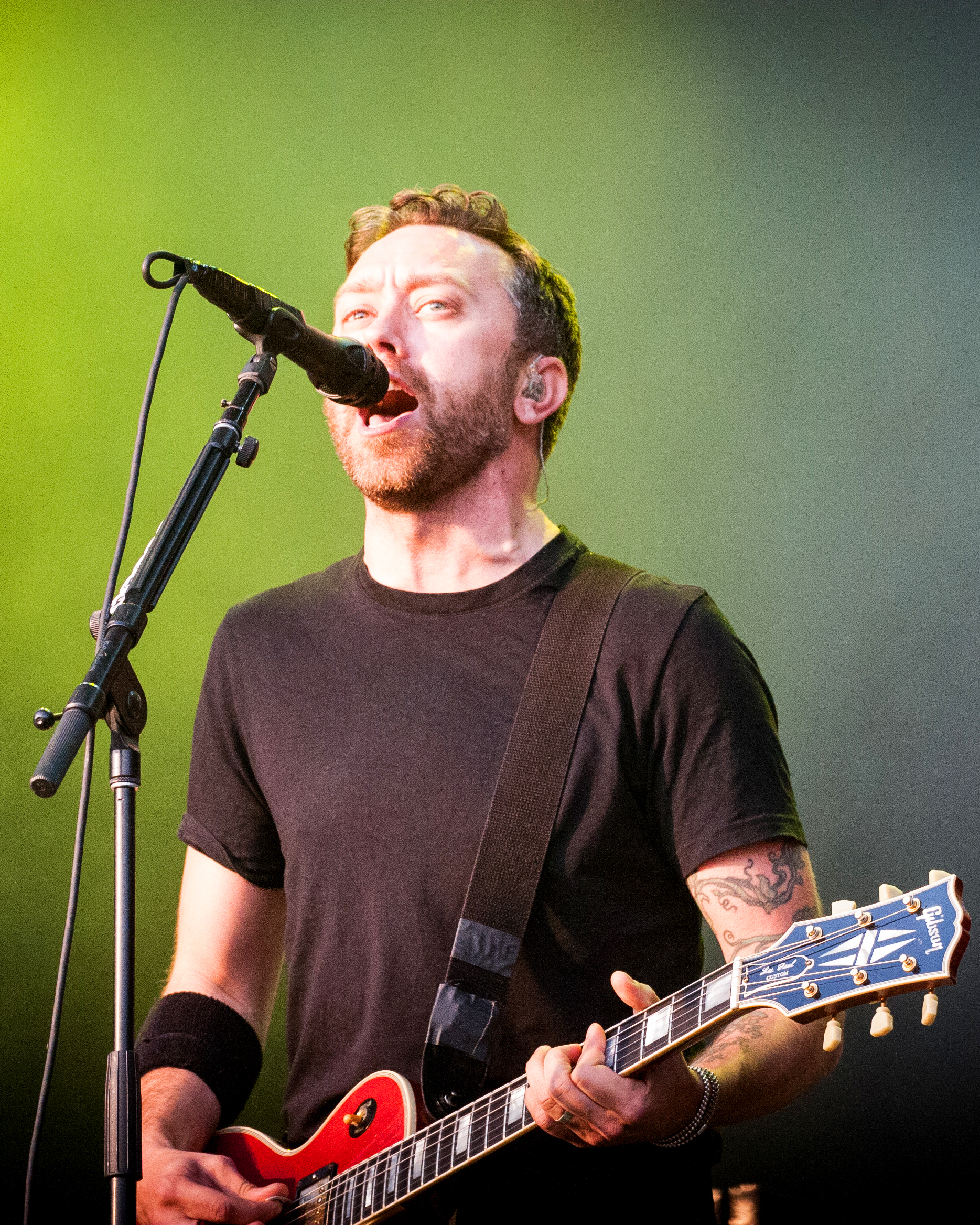
Tim McIlrath

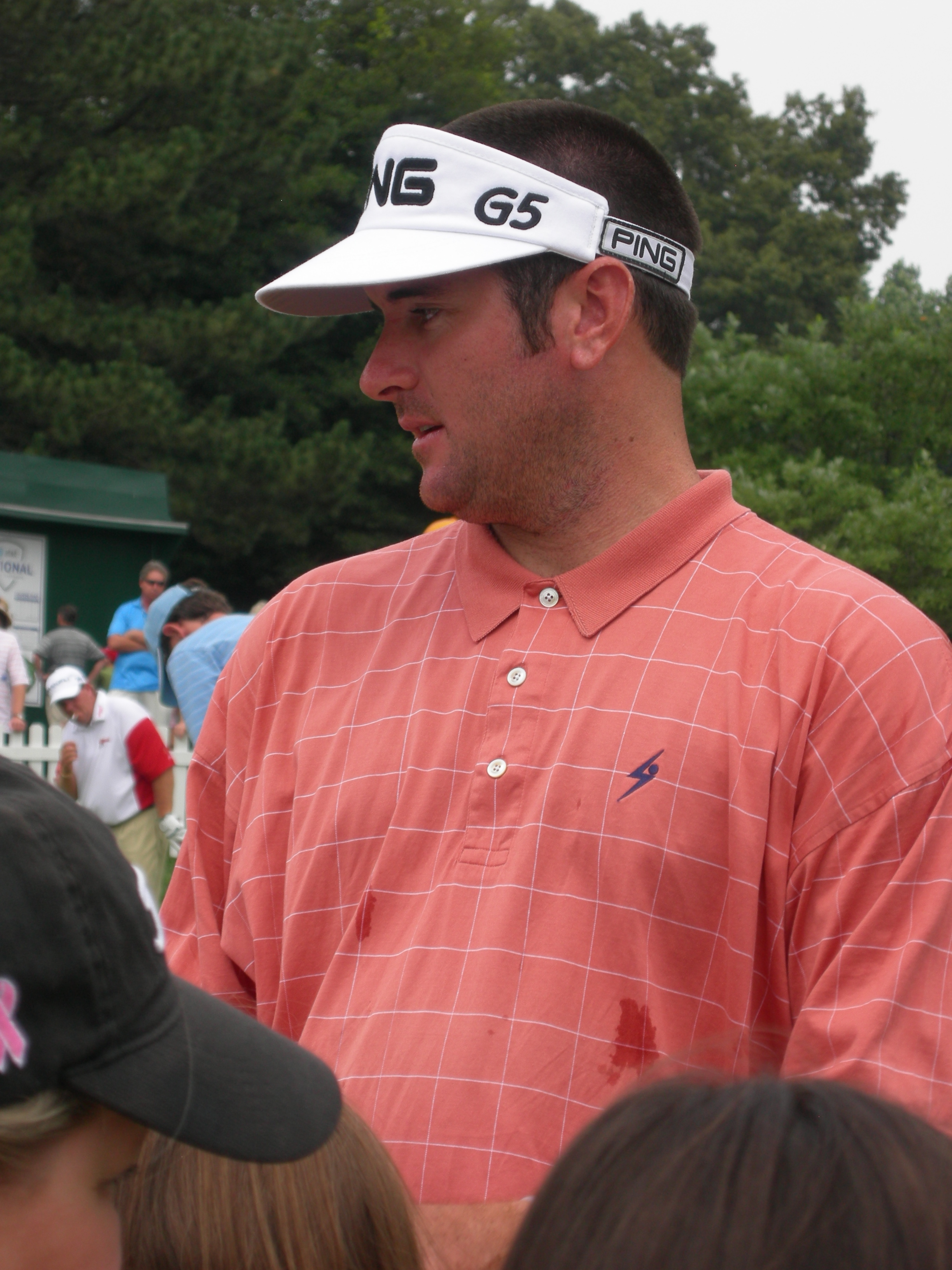
Bubba Watson

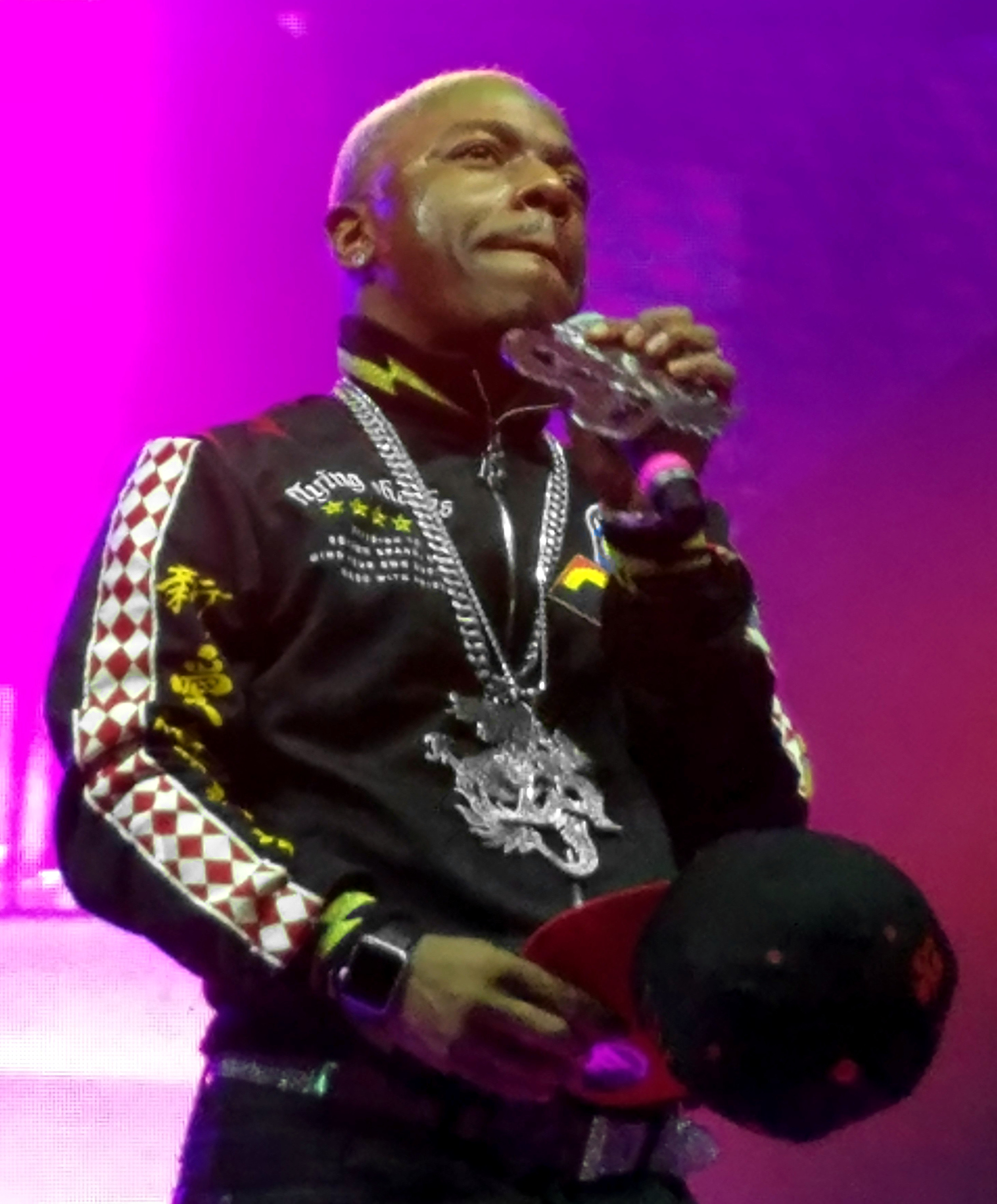
Sisqó

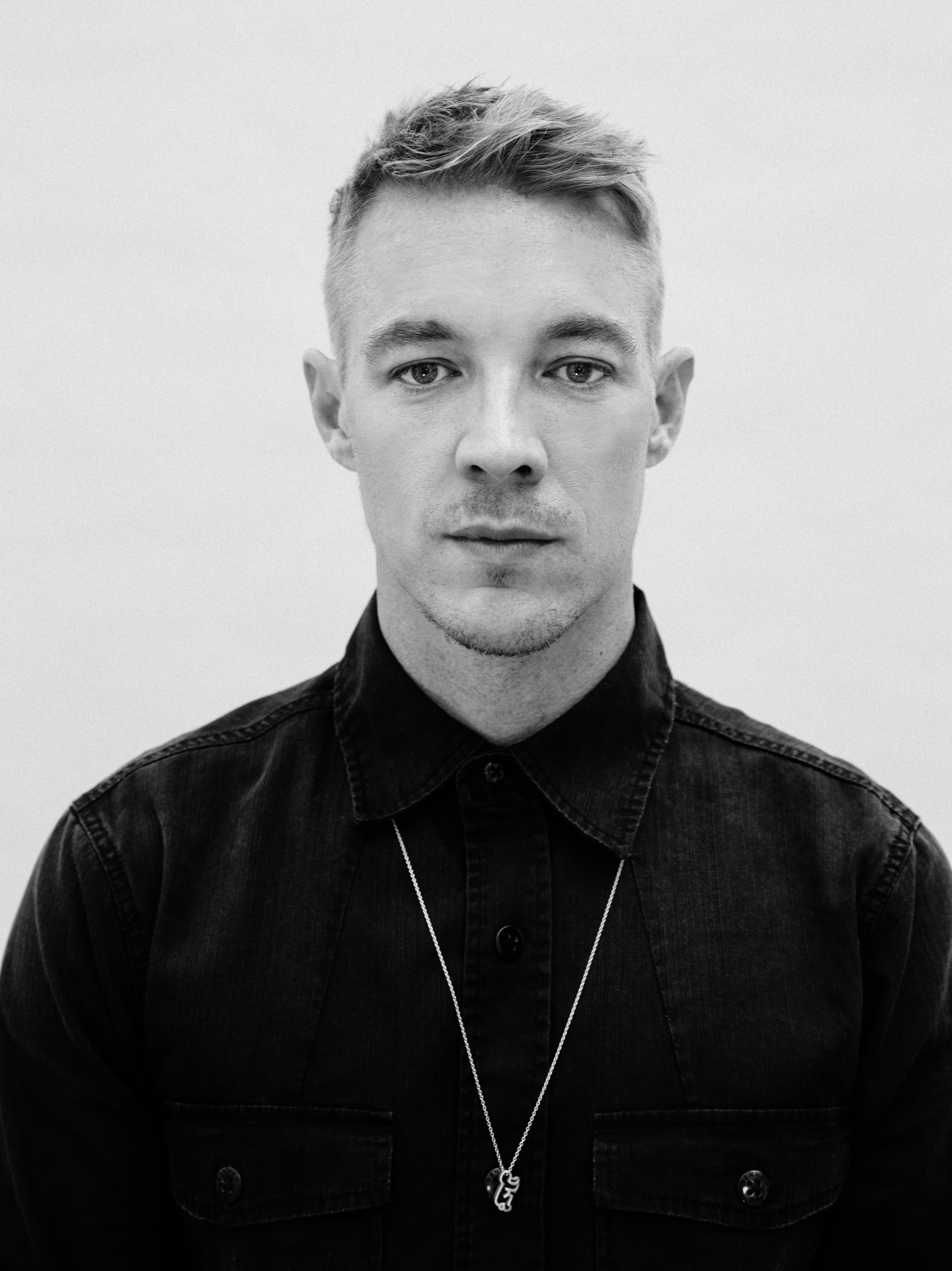
Diplo

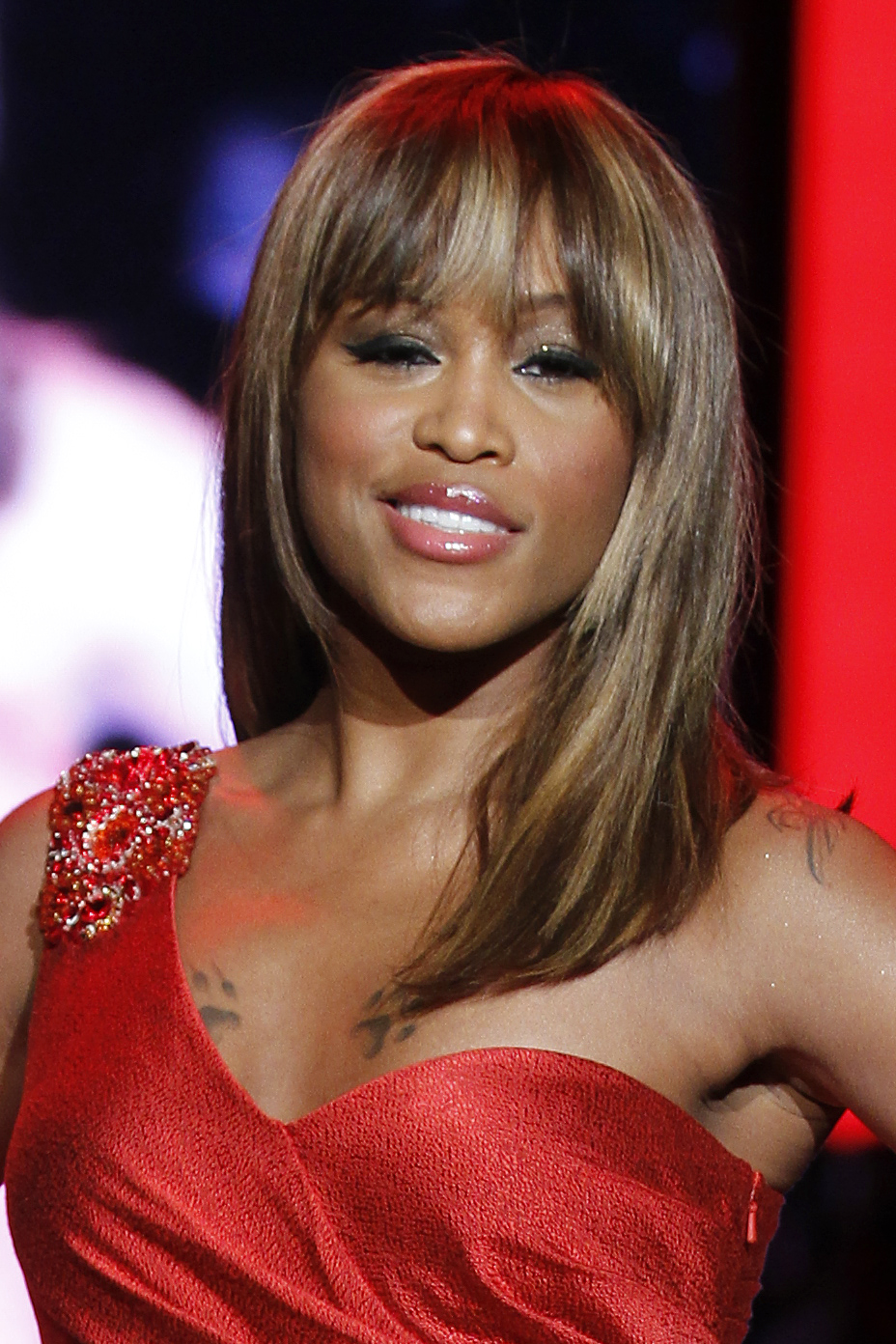
Eve

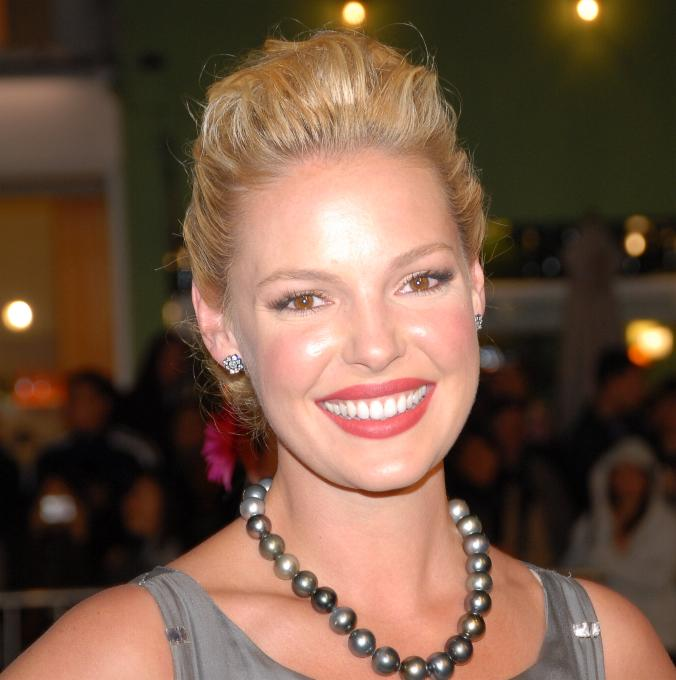
Katherine Heigl

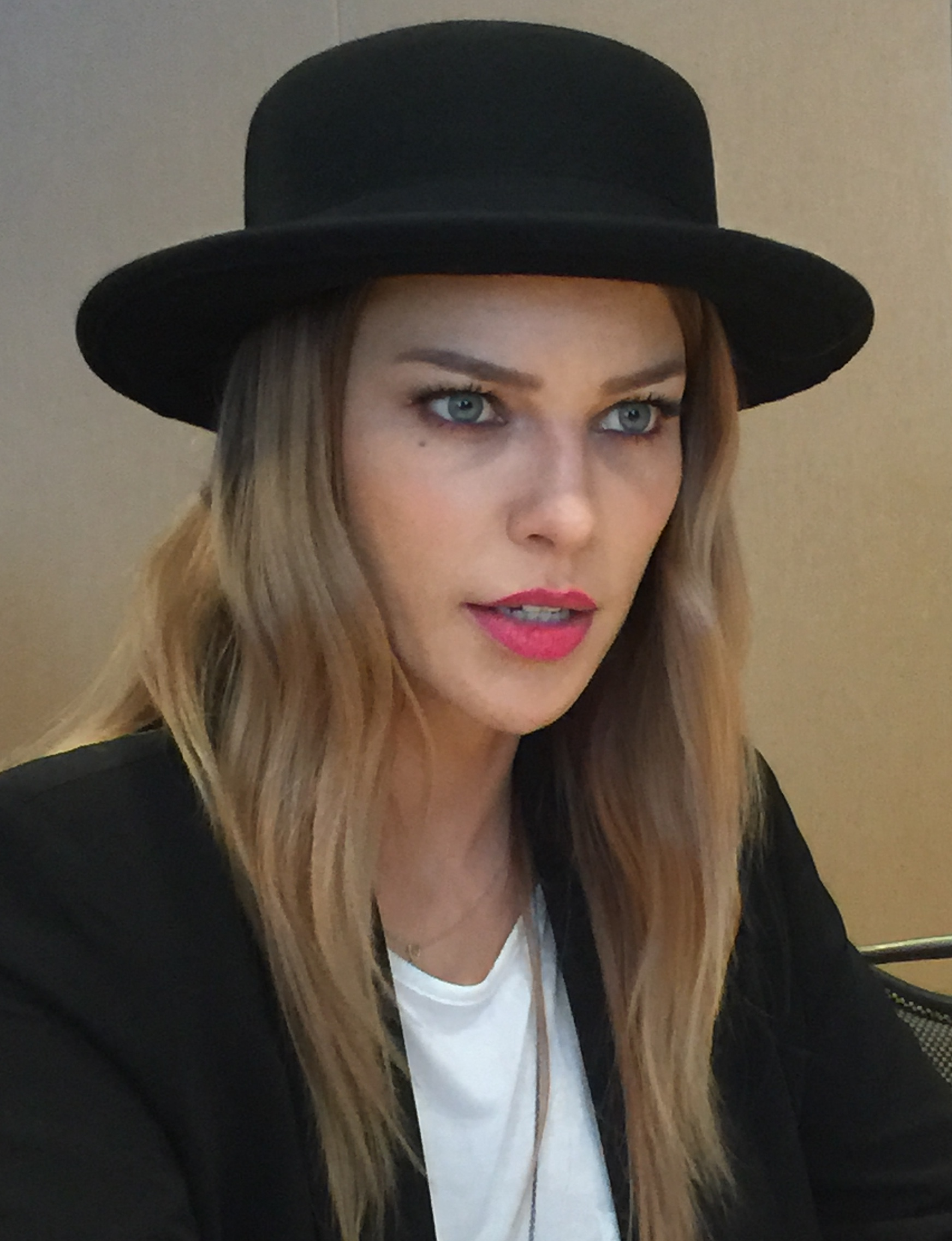
Lauren German

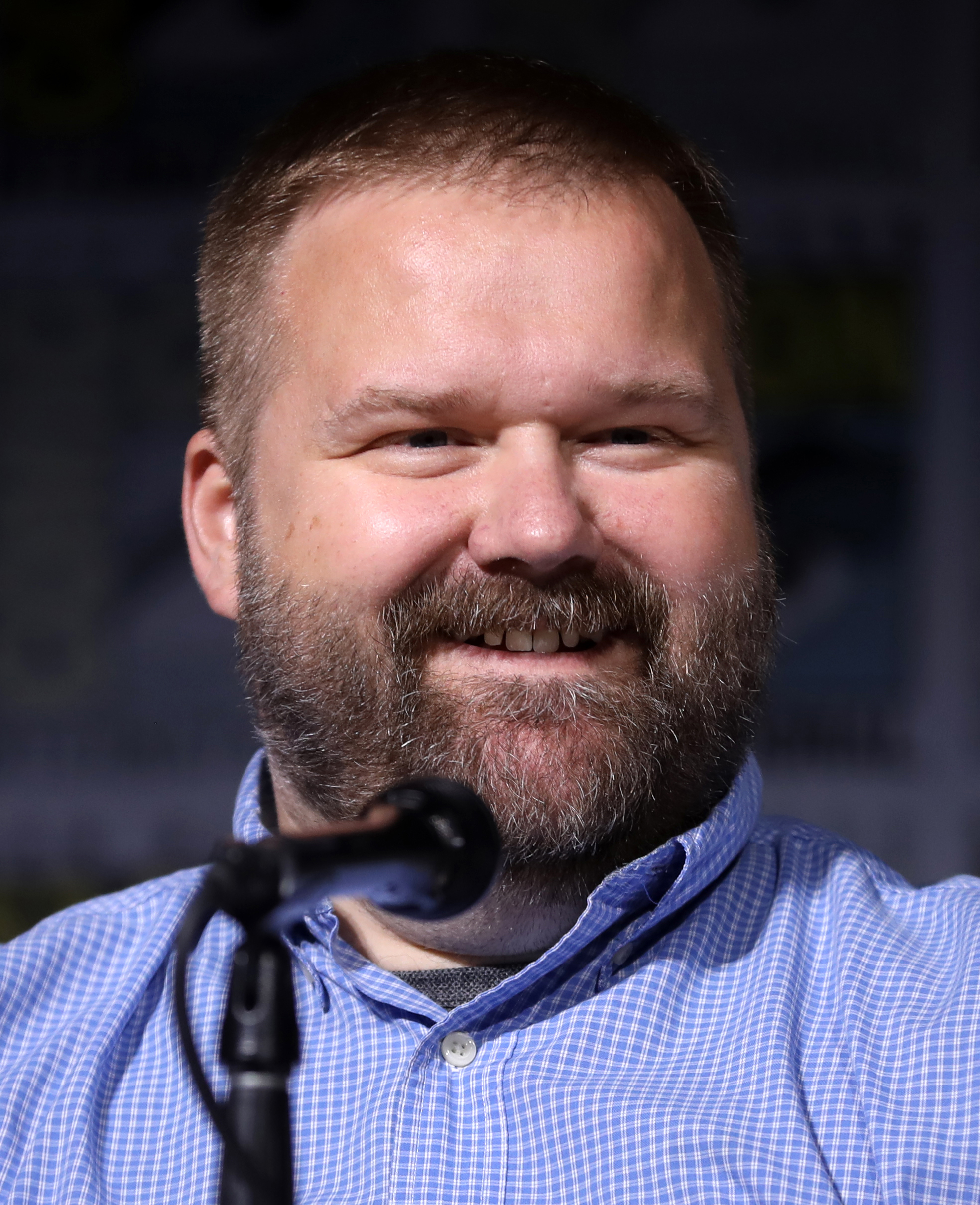
Robert Kirkman

- November 1
  - Big Kuntry King, rapper
  - Jeremy Glazer, actor
  - Mary Kate Schellhardt, actress
  - Jessica Valenti, blogger and writer
- November 2 – William D. Swenson, Army Lt. Colonel and Medal of Honor Recipient
- November 3
  - Jaime Herrera Beutler, politician
  - Tim McIlrath, singer and frontman for Rise Against
- November 5 – Bubba Watson, golfer
- November 6
  - Keith Aucoin, ice hockey player
  - Ainsley Battles, football player
  - Nicole Dubuc, actress and writer
  - Taryn Manning, actress
- November 7
  - Elisabeth Bachman, volleyball player
  - Coy Wire, television anchor, correspondent, and former professional football player
- November 8 – Michael Boggs, Christian musician
- November 9
  - Steven López, martial artist
  - Sisqó, actor and singer
- November 10
  - Diplo, DJ and music producer
  - Eve, rapper
- November 11 – Aaron Bruno, singer/songwriter and frontman for Awolnation
- November 12 – Lena Yada, model and professional wrestling manager
- November 13
  - Chad Beasley, football player
  - Josh Blackburn, ice hockey player
- November 14
  - Bobby Allen, ice hockey player
  - Ethan Boyes, cyclist (d. 2023)
  - Dustin Burrows, politician
  - Xavier Nady, baseball player and coach
  - Chris Shar, rock drummer
- November 15 – Floyd Womack, football player
- November 16
  - Kip Bouknight, baseball player
  - Orshawante Bryant, football player
- November 17 – Reggie Wayne, football player
- November 18 – Daniel Chong, animator
- November 19
  - Jeff Bailey, baseball player
  - Roxana Brusso, Peruvian-born actress
  - Chad Doreck, actor
- November 20
  - Amy Kennedy, politician
  - Nadine Velazquez, actress and model
- November 21 – Sara Tanaka, actress and physician
- November 22
  - Anthony Brindisi, politician
  - Karen O, South Korean-born singer/songwriter and frontwoman for Yeah Yeah Yeahs
- November 23 – Destin Daniel Cretton, director
- November 24
  - Gary Baxter, football player
  - Katherine Heigl, actress
- November 25 – Joe Borchard, baseball player
- November 26
  - Cristin O'Keefe Aptowicz, nonfiction writer and poet
  - Shlomi Lavie, Israeli-born drummer for Marcy Playground
- November 27
  - Josh Blue, comedian
  - Jimmy Rollins, baseball player
- November 28
  - Brent Albright, wrestler
  - Jerametrius Butler, football player
  - Aimee Garcia, actress
- November 29
  - Fred Akshar, politician
  - Heather Bown, volleyball player
  - Lauren German, actress
- November 30
  - Clay Aiken, singer, American Idol contestant, and politician
  - Jordan Belfi, actor
  - Robert Kirkman, comic book writer

=== December ===
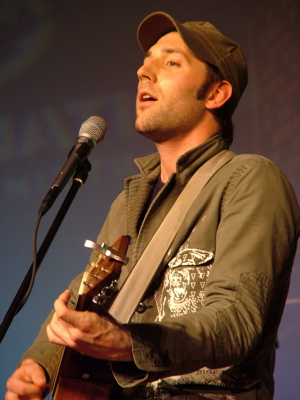
Mat Kearney

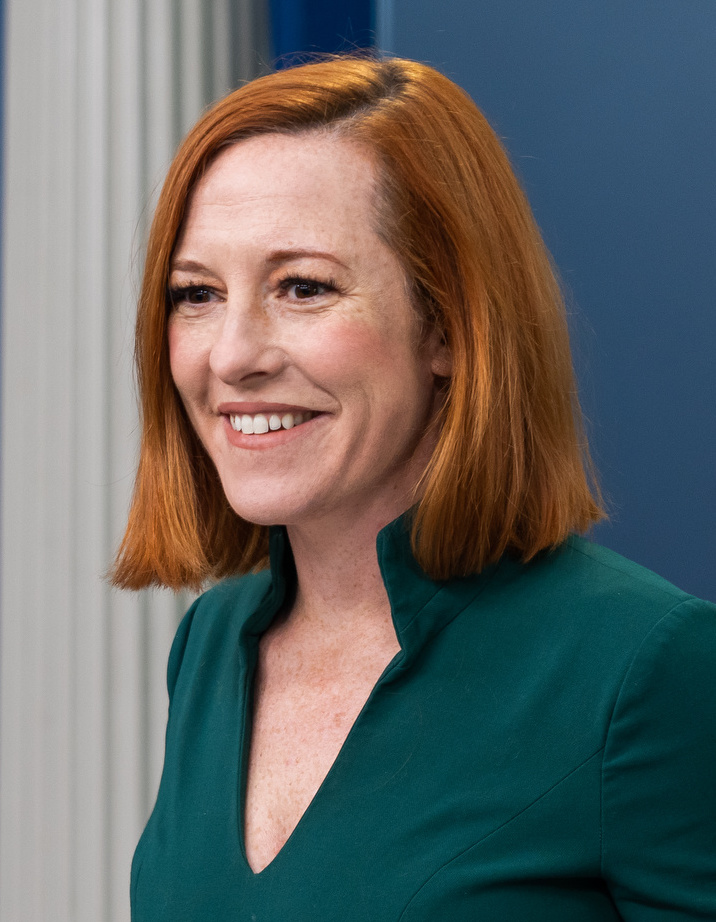
Jen Psaki

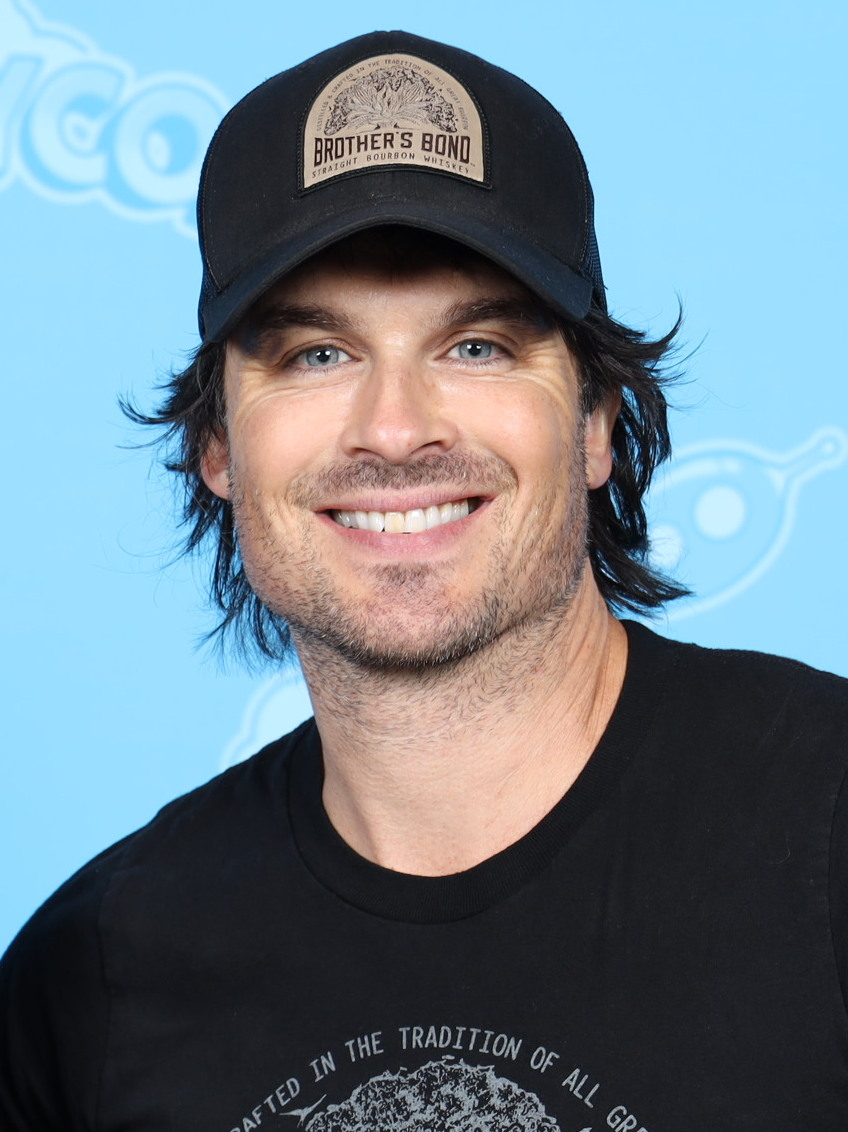
Ian Somerhalder

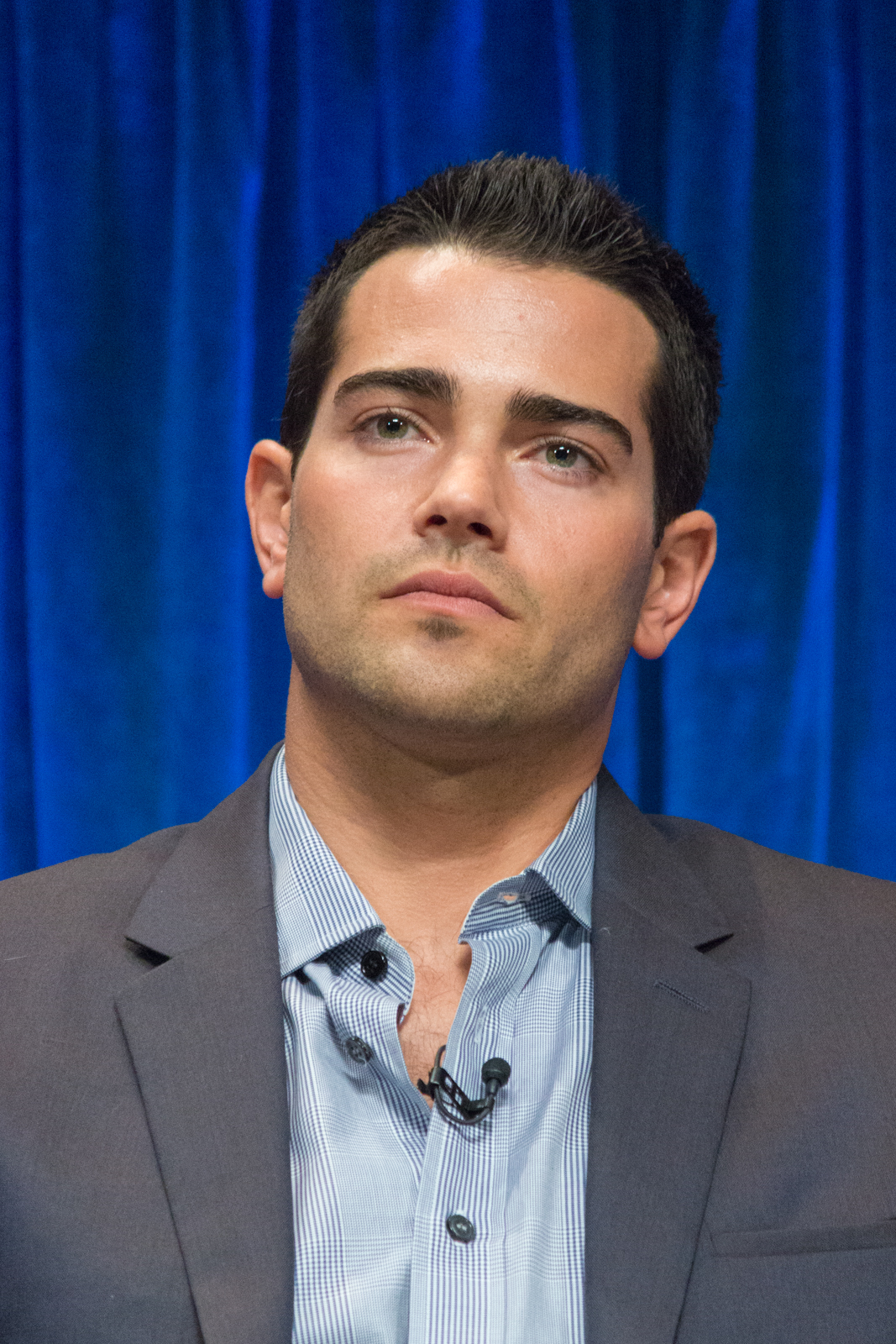
Jesse Metcalfe

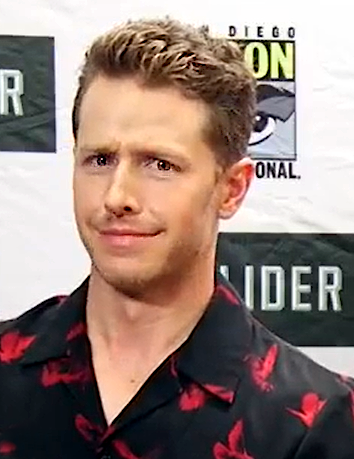
Josh Dallas

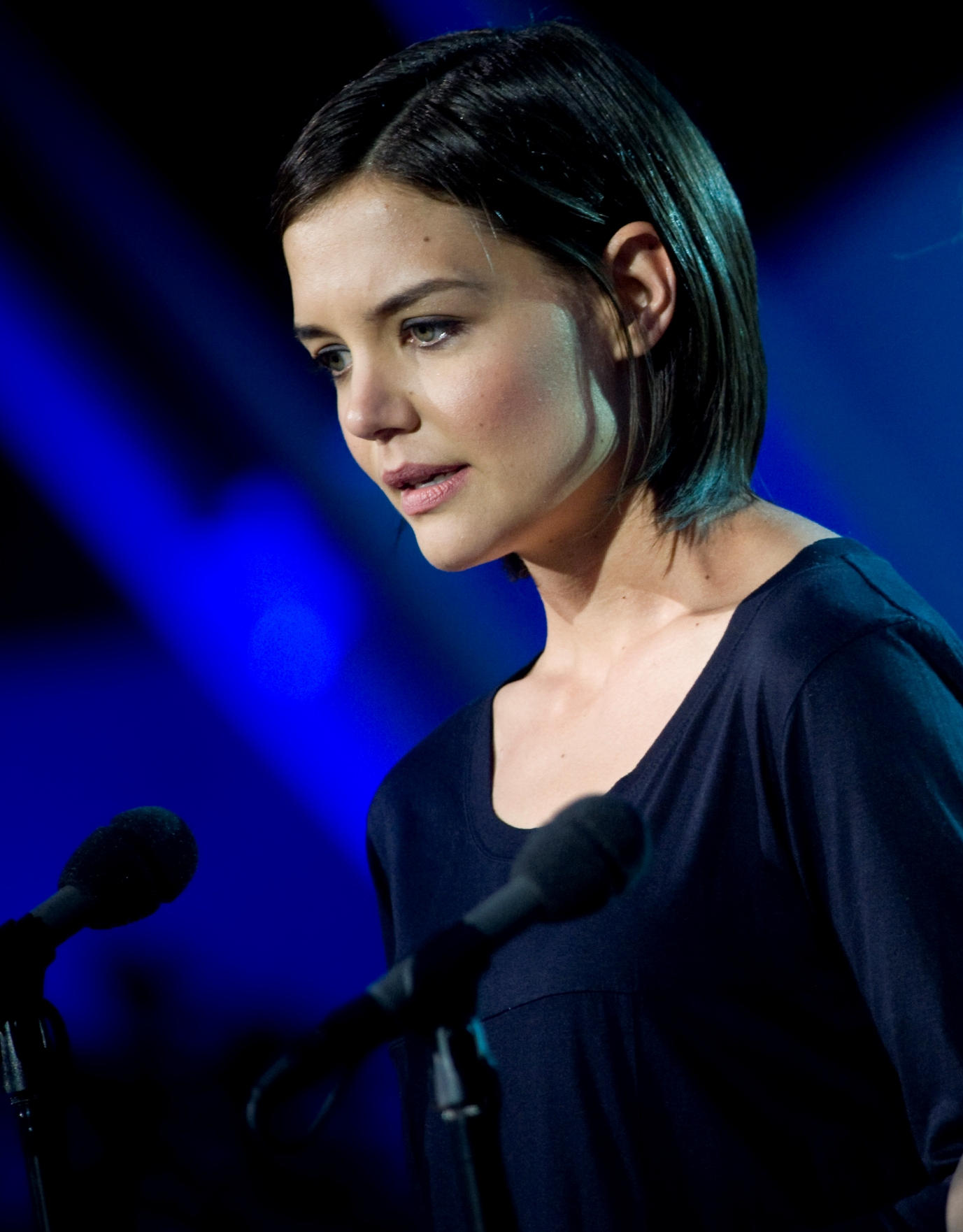
Katie Holmes

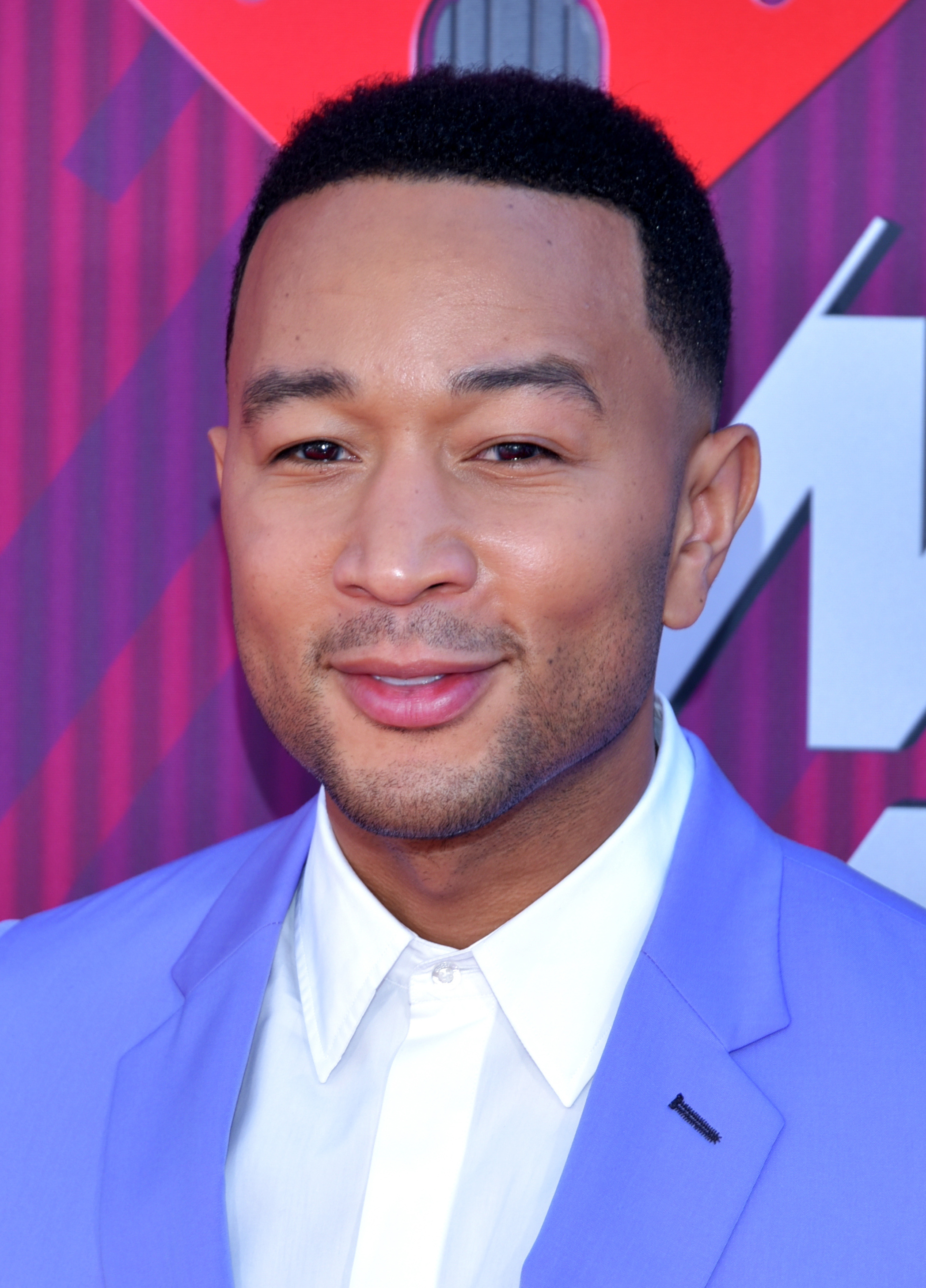
John Legend

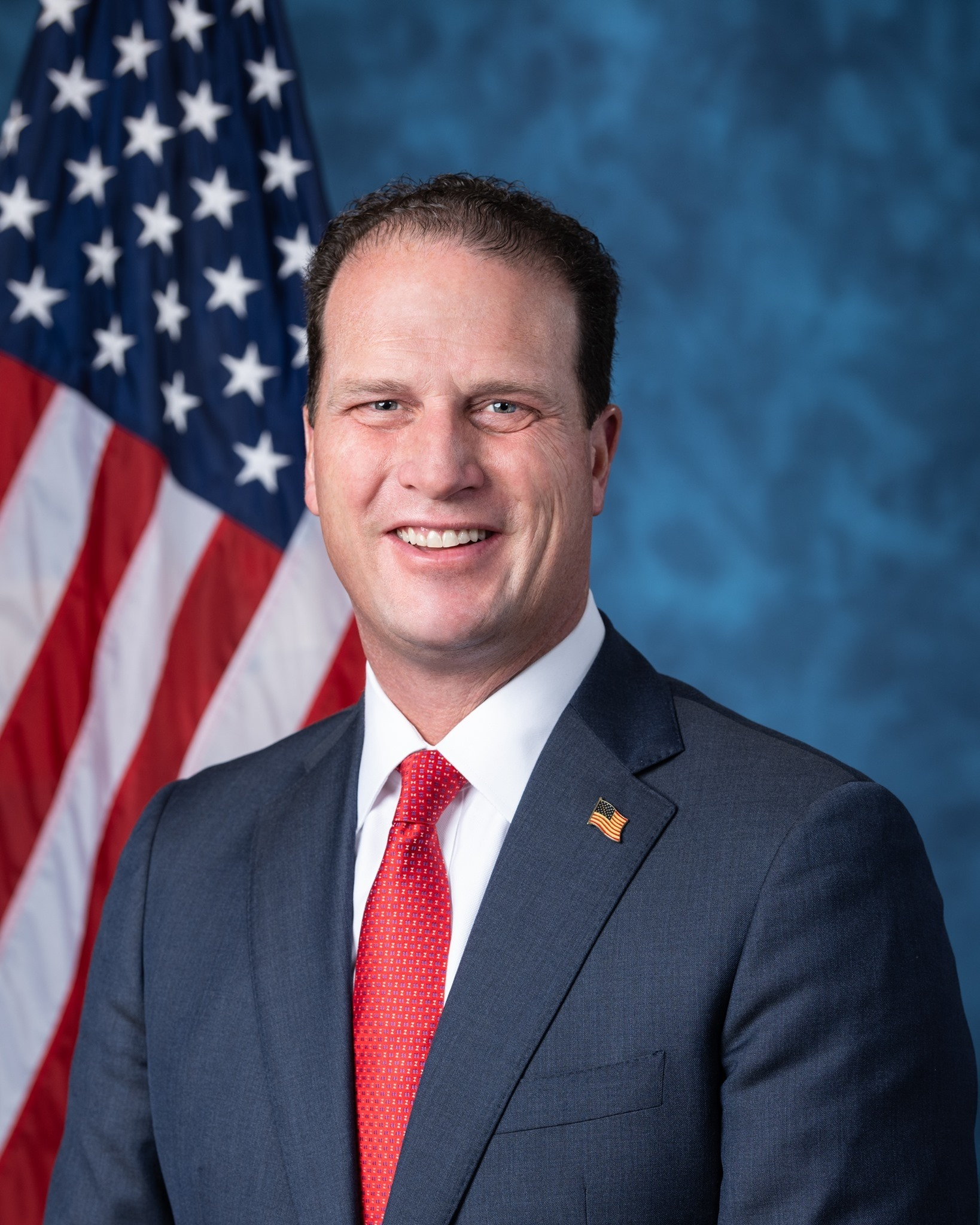
August Pfluger

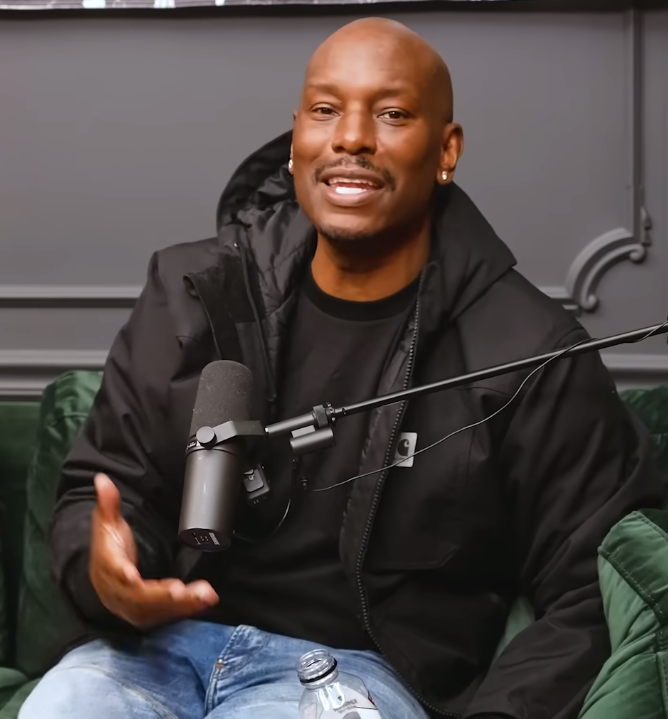
Tyrese Gibson

- December 1
  - Heather Aldama, soccer player
  - Mat Kearney, singer/songwriter and musician
  - Jen Psaki, political advisor, White House Press Secretary (2021–2022)
- December 2 – Jason Collins, basketball player (d. 2026)
- December 4
  - Miri Ben-Ari, Israeli-born musician, producer, and humanitarian
  - Jamie Bochert, model and musician
  - Cory Bradford, basketball player
- December 5
  - Neil Druckmann, Israeli-born video game writer and programmer, founder of Naughty Dog
  - David Hodges, singer/songwriter and record producer
- December 6
  - K. D. Aubert, actress, fashion model, and singer
  - Chris Başak, baseball player
  - Ron Browz, recording artist and record producer
  - Jason Bulger, baseball player
- December 7
  - Jaime Ambriz, soccer player
  - Shiri Appleby, actress
  - Idrees Bashir, football player
  - Jeff Nichols, director and screenwriter
  - Ronald J. Shurer, army medic (d. 2020)
- December 8
  - Mike Barr, football player
  - Kenny Brunner, basketball player
  - Ian Somerhalder, actor
  - Vernon Wells, baseball player
- December 9
  - Nick Bruel, author
  - Jesse Metcalfe, actor
- December 10
  - John Arigo, basketball player
  - Brandon Novak, motivational speaker, author, skateboarder, and stunt performer
  - Summer Phoenix, actress
- December 11 – Courtney Henggeler, actress
- December 12
  - Brandon Adams, poker player
  - Teryn Ashley, tennis player
  - Erick Baker, singer/songwriter
- December 13
  - Cameron Douglas, actor
  - B.J. Penn, martial artist
- December 14 – Cedric Bonner, football player
- December 15
  - Coffey Anderson, country singer/songwriter
  - Ned Brower, drummer and vocalist for Rooney
  - Jerome McDougle, American football player
- December 16
  - Scott Bailey, actor
  - Eric 'Kaine' Jackson, rapper and member of Ying Yang Twins
- December 17
  - Beau Burchell, guitarist and vocalist for Saosin
  - Marc Lamont Hill, activist and political commentator
  - Chase Utley, baseball player
- December 18
  - Chad Brown, horse trainer
  - Michael Christopher Brown, photographer
  - Josh Dallas, actor
  - Katie Holmes, actress
  - Ravi Patel, actor
- December 19 – Patrick Casey, screenwriter and actor
- December 20 – Jacqueline Saburido, Venezuelan-born social activist (d. 2019)
- December 21
  - Mike Vitar, actor and firefighter
  - Rutina Wesley, actress
- December 22
  - Danny Ahn, rapper for g.o.d
  - Anthony Jeselnik, comedian, writer, actor, and producer
- December 23
  - P. J. Alexander, football player
  - Andra Davis, football player
- December 24 – Tony Angelo, drift racer and stunt driver
- December 25 – Jeremy Strong, actor
- December 27 – Yasemin Besen-Cassino, sociologist and professor
- December 28
  - John Legend, R&B singer/songwriter
  - August Pfluger, politician
- December 29
  - B-Boy, wrestler
  - LaToya London, singer
  - Angelo Taylor, athlete
- December 30
  - Sari Anderson, multisport and endurance athlete
  - Devin Brown, basketball player
  - Vanessa Short Bull, beauty pageant titleholder
  - Tyrese Gibson, singer/songwriter, rapper, actor, model, and screenwriter
  - Andrea Tantaros, television host, political analyst, and commentator
- December 31
  - Craig Wayne Boyd, country music singer
  - Johnny Sins, adult film star

=== Full date unknown ===
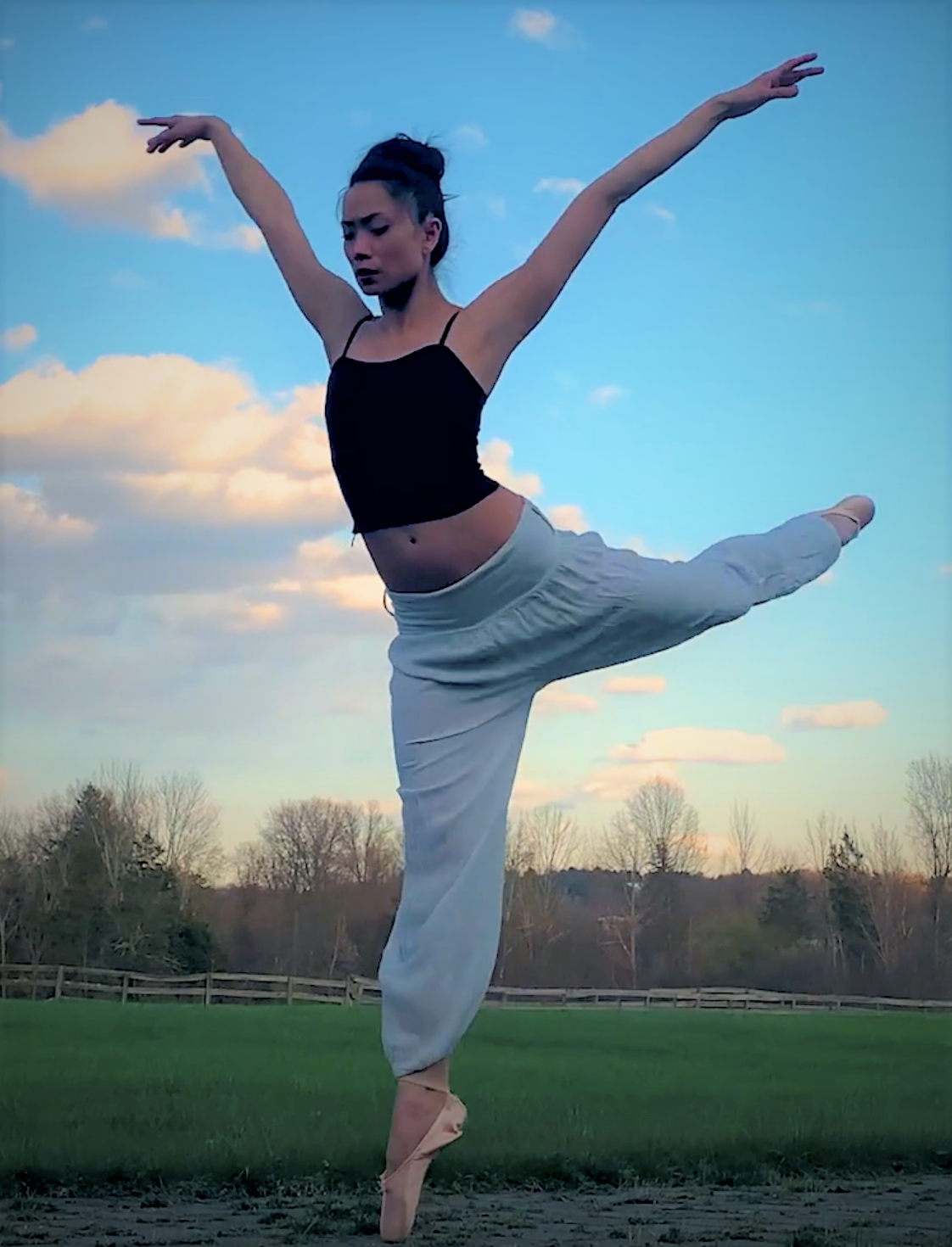
Stella Abrera

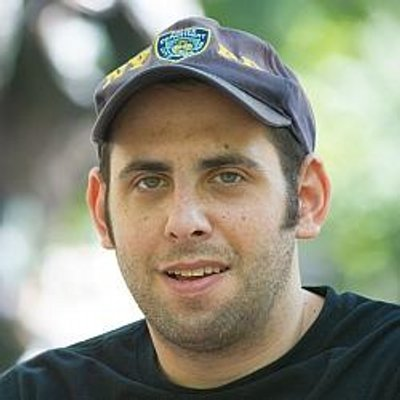
Evan Blass

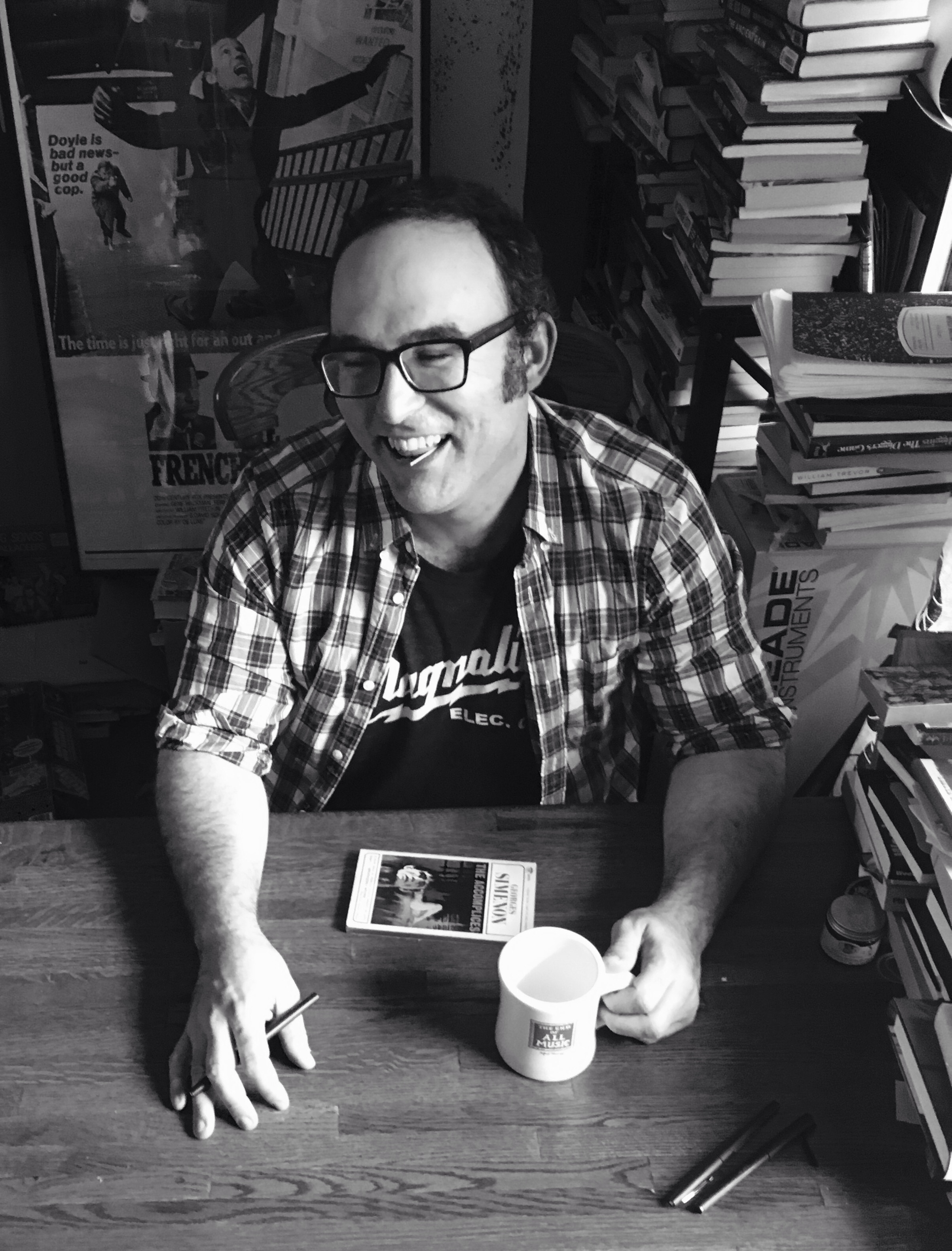
William Michael Boyle

- Eric Abrahamsen, translator for the Chinese language
- Stella Abrera, Philippine-born ballerina
- Adeem, rapper
- Deborah Ager, poet
- Tanya Aguiñiga, artist
- Allison Ahlfeldt, Paralympic volleyball player
- Nilo Alcala, Philippine-born composer
- Dick Allen, bowler
- Kalliope Amorphous, artist
- Ryan G. Anderson, convicted terrorist
- Apexer, artist
- Bomani Armah, vocalist
- Asencio, painter
- Josh Azzarella, artist
- Christian Baldini, opera and orchestra conductor
- Simon Barrett, actor, producer, and screenwriter
- Matt Bean, journalist
- Claire Beckett, photographer
- Vaughn Bell, artist
- Christopher Belmonte, radio personality
- Stacey Bendet, fashion designer and founder of Alice + Olivia
- Ruha Benjamin, Indian-born sociologist and professor
- Paul Bennecke, political consultant
- Jenn Bennett, German-born author and novelist
- Kathryn Biber, lawyer and political counsel
- Melanie Bilenker, artist
- Margot Black, tenant rights organizer, activist, grass-roots lobbyist, and political candidate
- Sara Black, artist
- Craig Blais, poet
- M. Blash, director, screenwriter, actor, and visual artist
- Evan Blass, blogger, editor, and phone leaker
- J. T. Blatty, photojournalist and Army Captain
- Kevin Blechdom, experimental electronic musician and performance artist
- Jaswinder Bolina, poet
- William Michael Boyle, author
- Alex Brewer, artist
- Sean Brock, chef
- Kelsey Brookes, artist
- Julia Brown, artist
- Laurie Brown, photographer
- Kasey Buckles, professor of economics
- Noah Buschel, director and screenwriter
- Rhett Ayers Butler, journalist and author
- Toby Lightman, singer/songwriter

== Deaths ==
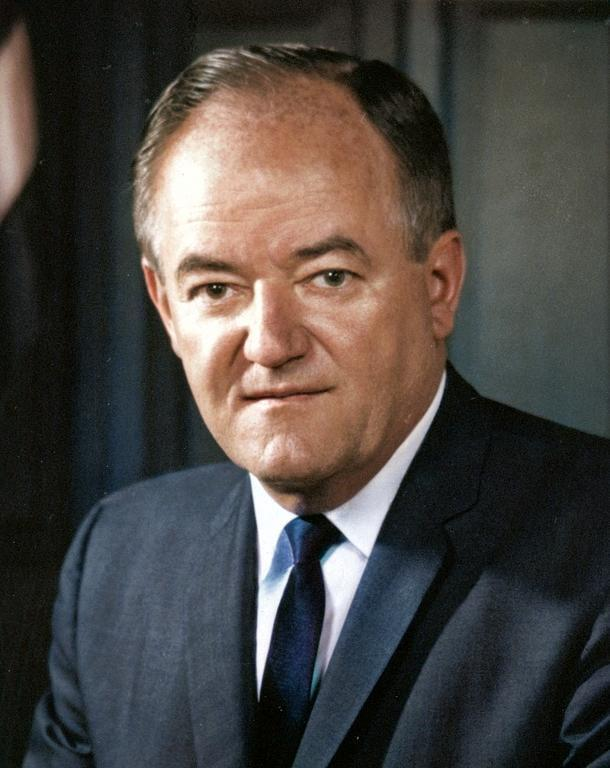
Hubert Humphrey

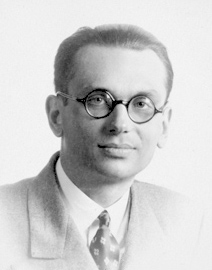
Kurt Gödel

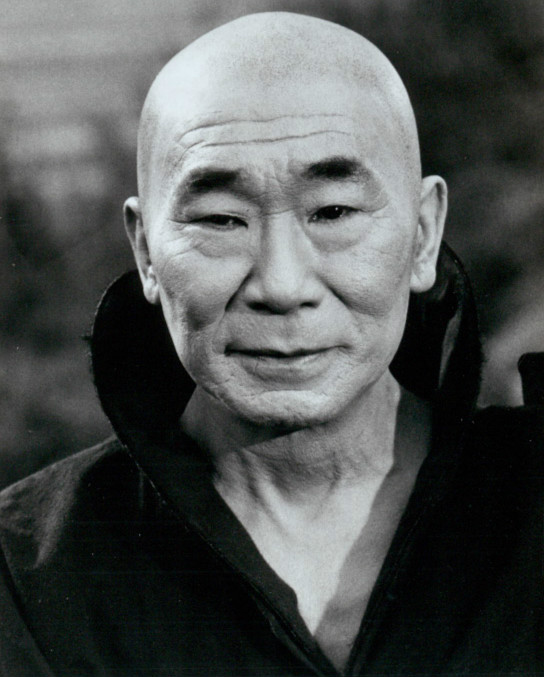
Philip Ahn

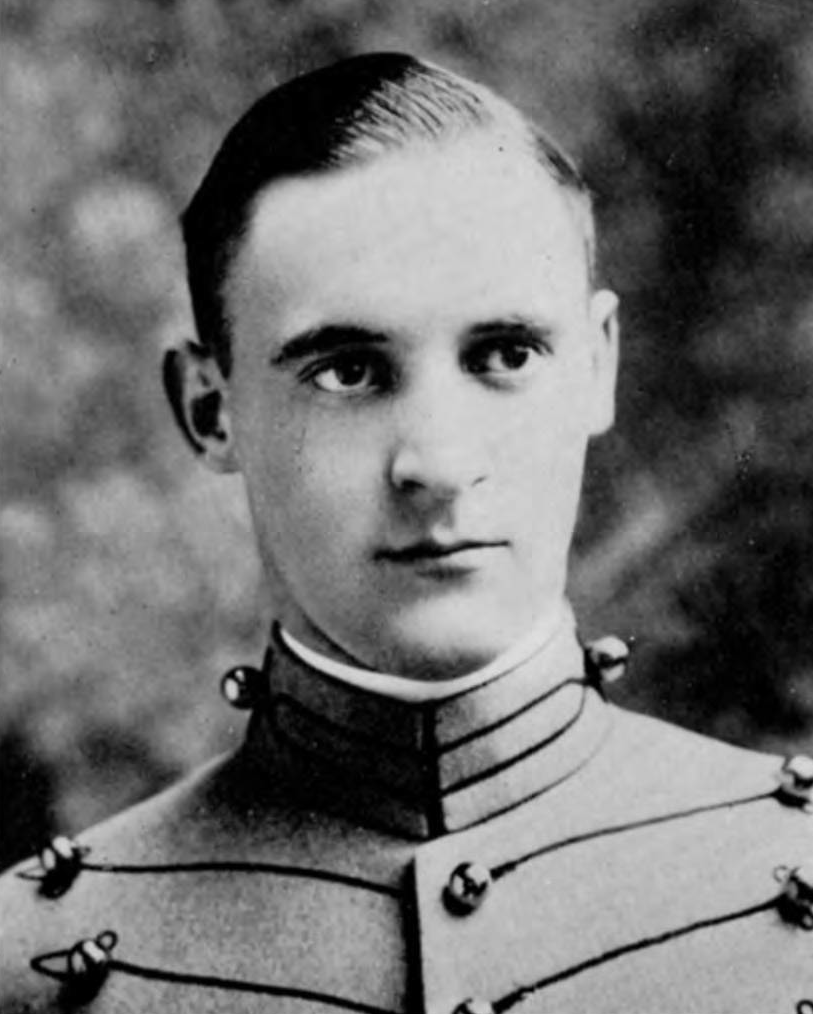
Lucius D. Clay

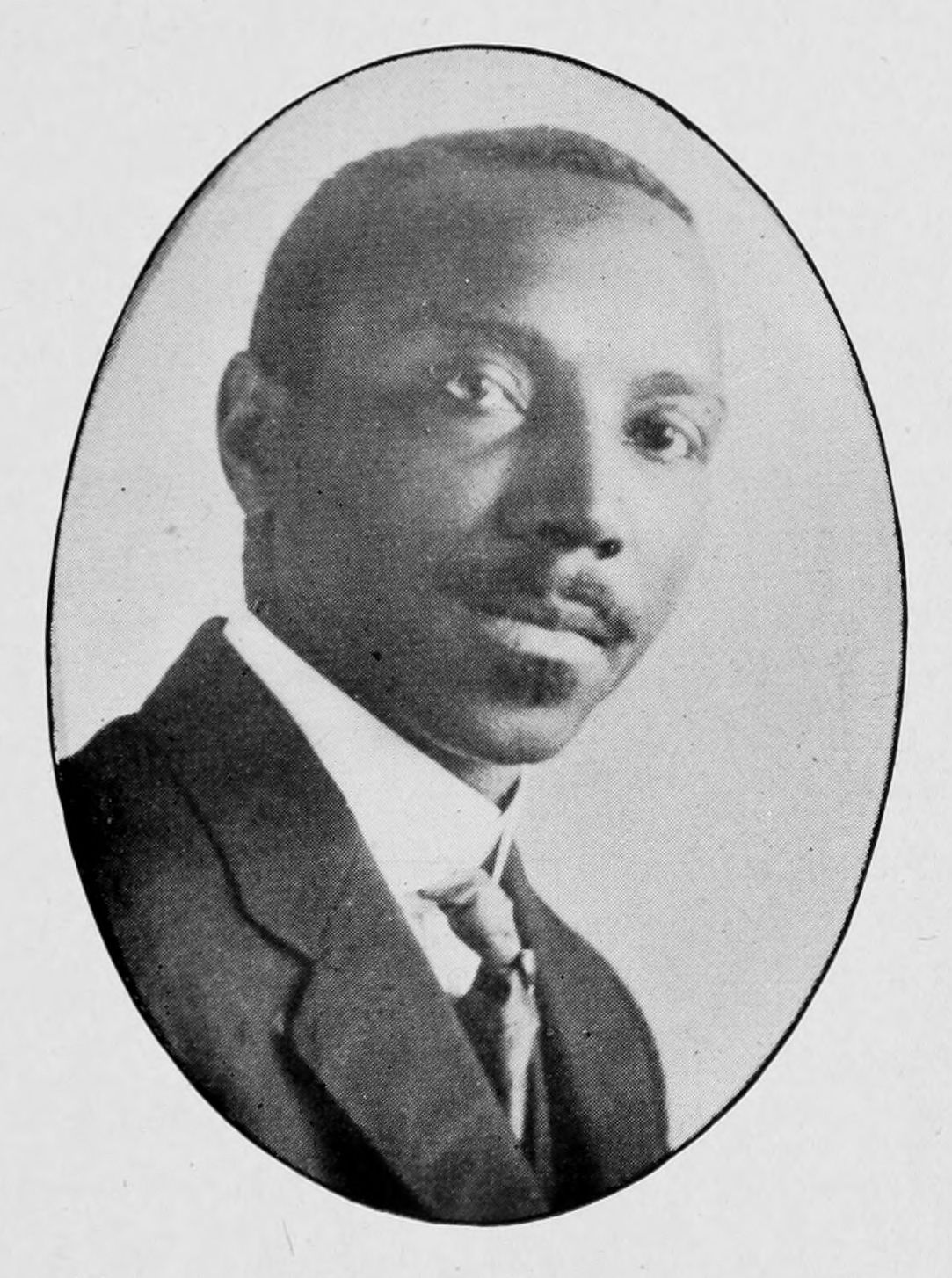
Thomas Wyatt Turner

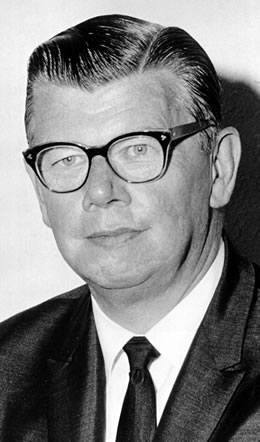
Bill Lear

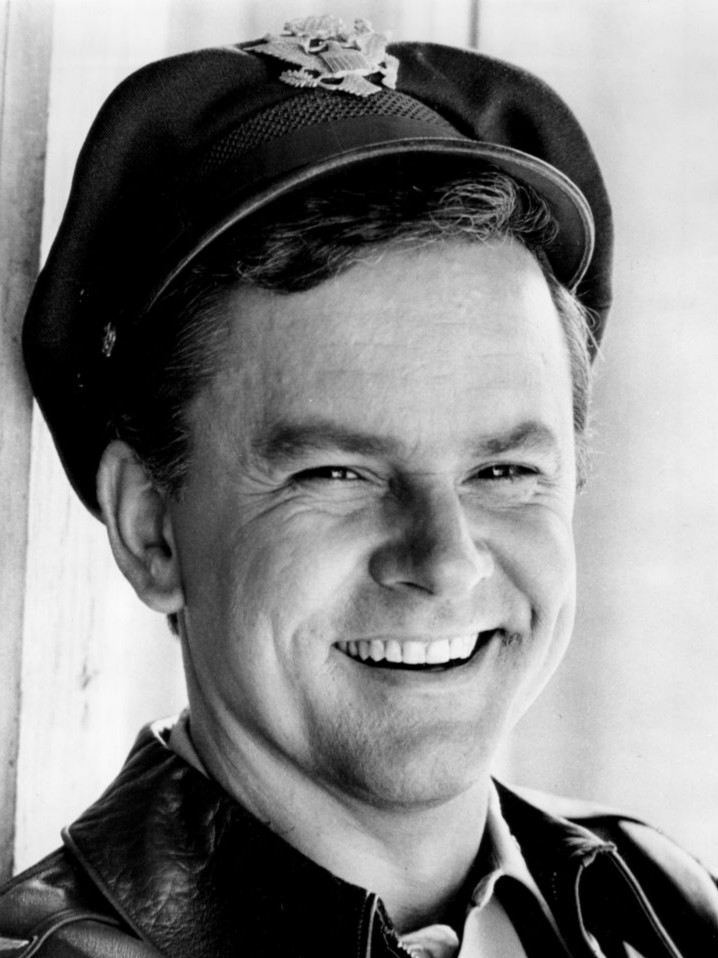
Bob Crane

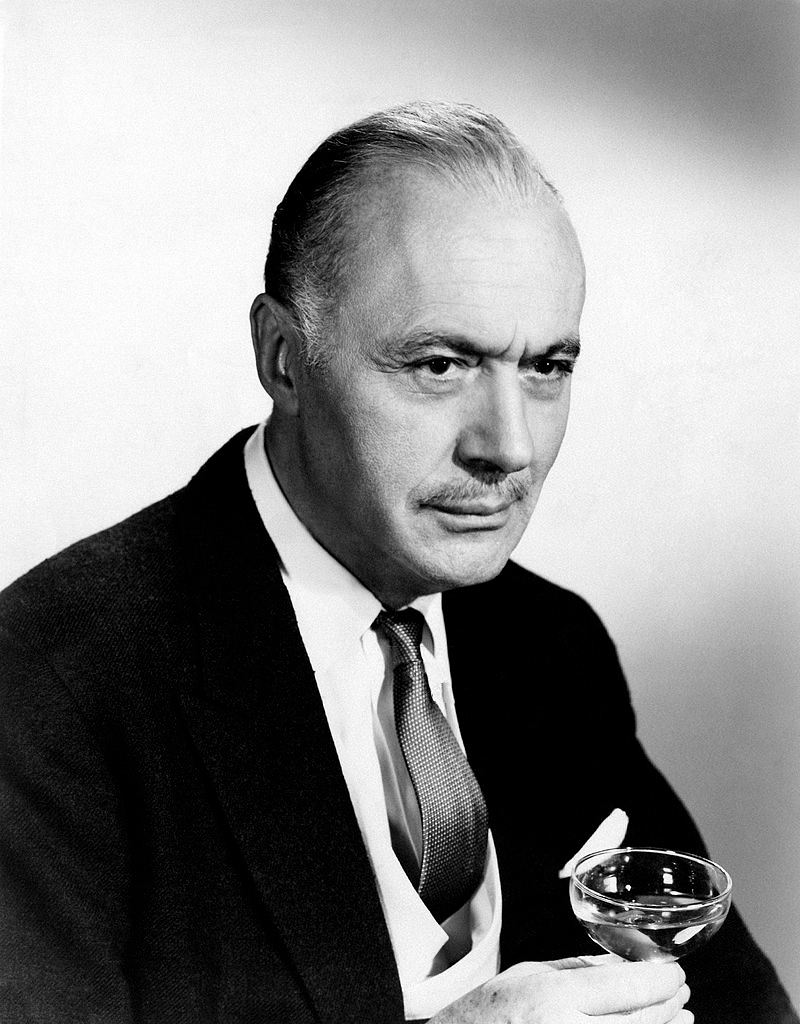
Charles Boyer

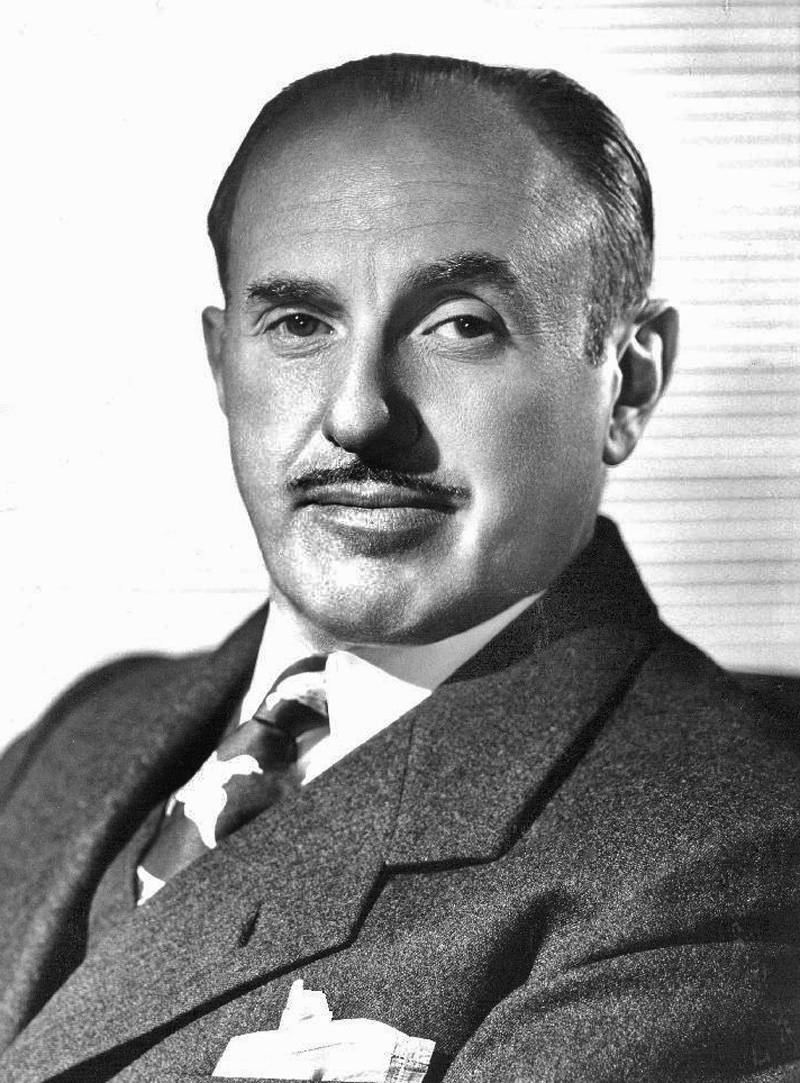
Jack L. Warner

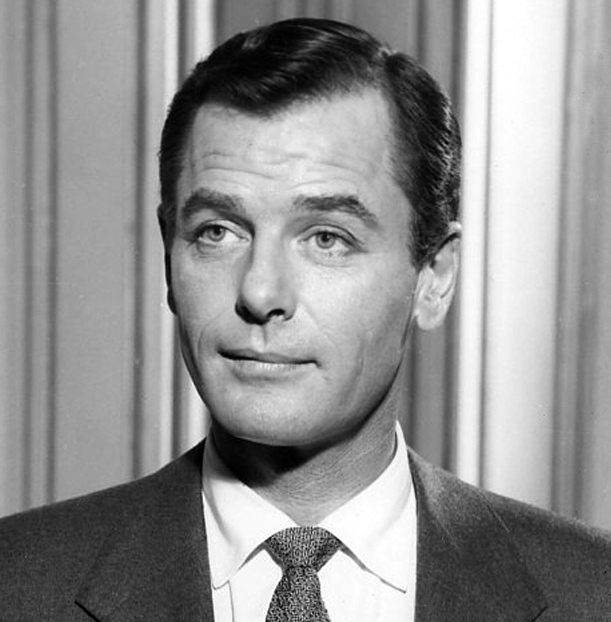
Gig Young

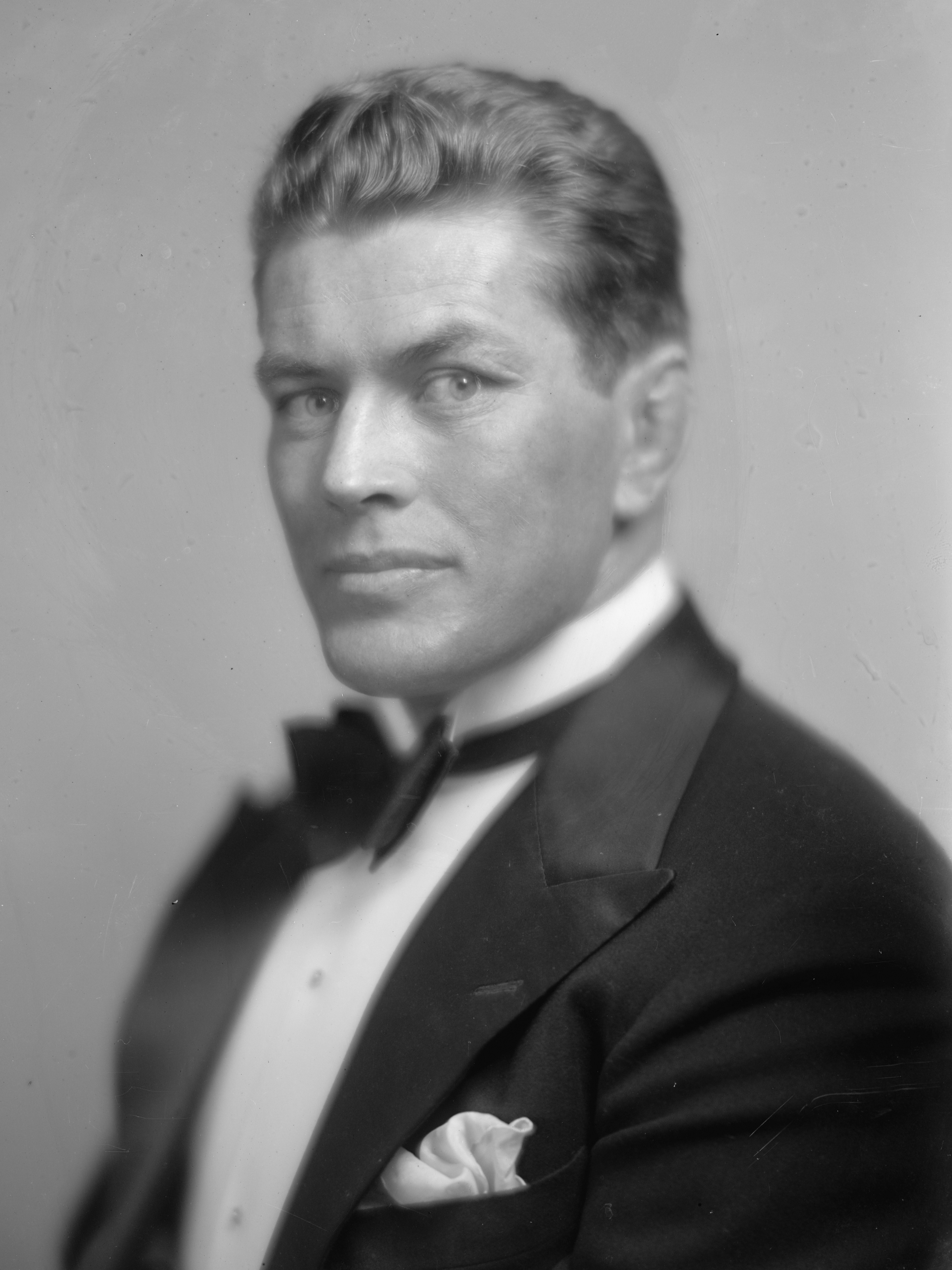
Gene Tunney

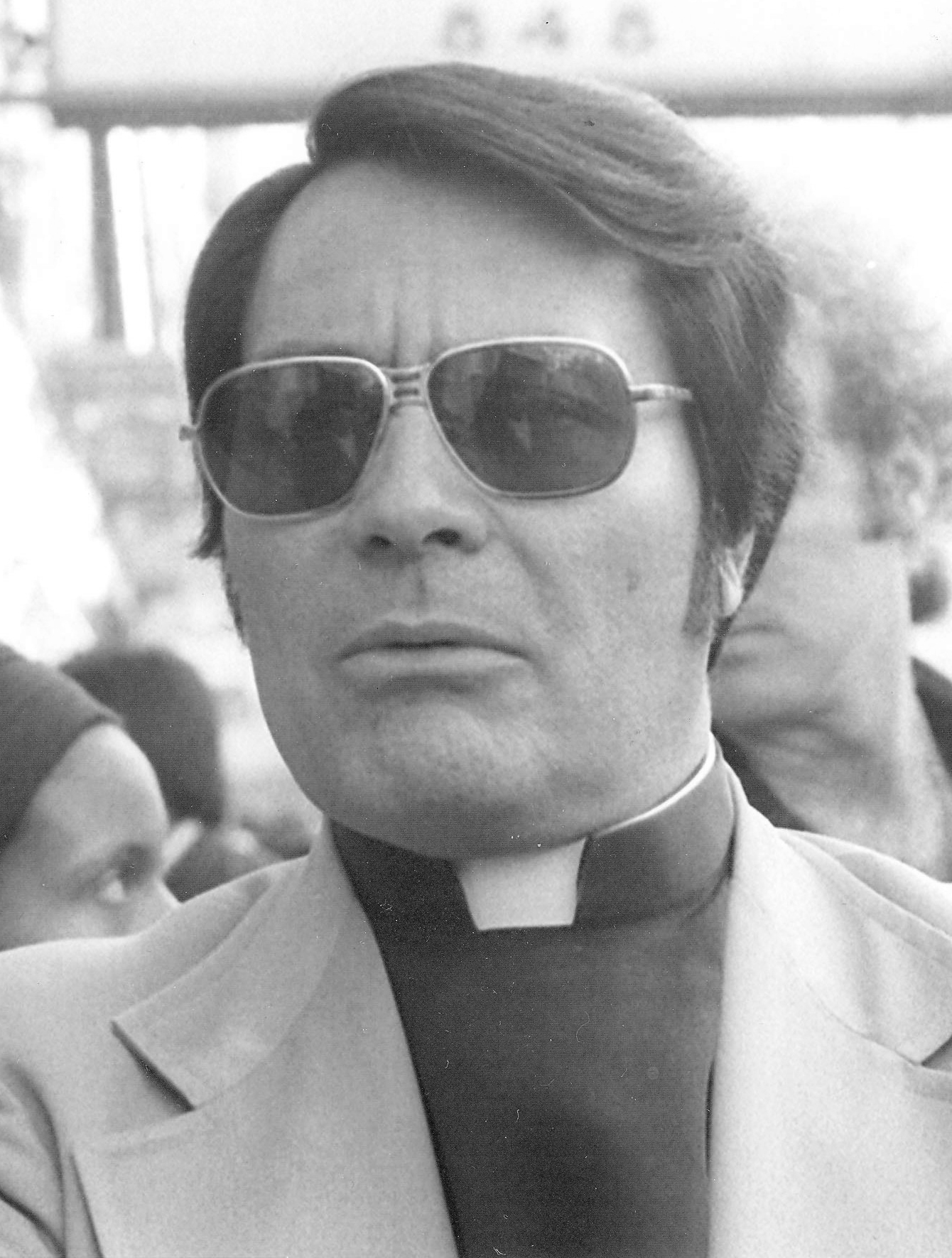
Jim Jones

- January 6 – John D. MacArthur, businessman and philanthropist (born 1897)
- January 9 – Robert Daniel Murphy, diplomat (born 1894)
- January 13
  - Hubert H. Humphrey, 38th vice president of the United States from 1965 to 1969 (born 1911)
  - Joe McCarthy, baseball manager (born 1887)
- January 14
  - Blossom Rock, actress (born 1895)
  - Kurt Gödel, mathematician (born 1906 in Austria-Hungary)
- January 18
  - Carl Betz, actor (born 1921)
  - Junius Matthews, actor (born 1890)
- January 20 – Gilbert Highet, classicist, academic, writer, intellectual, critic and literary historian (born 1906 in Scotland)
- January 23
  - Terry Kath, American guitarist and singer-songwriter (born 1946)
  - Jack Oakie, actor (born 1903)
- January 30 – Thomas Finney, lawyer and political strategist (born 1925)
- February 9 – Warren King, cartoonist (born 1916)
- February 14 – Claude Binyon, screenwriter and director (born 1905)
- February 16 – Edward Lindberg, Olympic track athlete (born 1886)
- February 18 – Maggie McNamara, actress (born 1928)
- February 22
  - Phyllis McGinley, children's story writer and poet (born 1905)
  - C. Paul Jennewein, sculptor (born 1890 in Germany)
  - Dennie Moore, actress (born 1902)
  - Ernest Palmer, cinematographer (born 1885)
- February 28
  - Philip Ahn, actor (born 1905)
  - Zara Cully, actress (born 1892)
- March 13 – John Cazale, film actor (born 1935)
- March 18
  - Leigh Brackett, science fiction author (born 1915)
  - Peggy Wood, actress (born 1892)
- March 19 – Faith Baldwin, romantic novelist and poet (born 1893)
- March 22
  - Sonora Smart Dodd, founder of Father's Day (born 1882)
  - Karl Wallenda, circus performer (born 1905)
  - John Hall Wheelock, poet (born 1886)
- March 23 – Bill Kenny, vocalist (born 1914)
- March 31 – Charles Best, American-Canadian medical scientist (born 1899)
- April 9 – Michael Wilson, screenwriter (born 1914)
- April 13 – Louella Ballerino, fashion designer (born 1900)
- April 16 – Lucius D. Clay, military governor of Germany from 1947 to 1949 (born 1898)
- April 19 – Joe Dougherty, first voice of Porky Pig (born 1898)
- April 21 – Thomas Wyatt Turner, civil rights activist, biologist and educator; first African American to receive a doctorate from Cornell (born 1877)
- April 22 – Will Geer, actor, activist, and musician (born 1902)
- May 1 – Edgar Church, comic book collector (born 1888)
- May 6 – Ethelda Bleibtrey, Olympic swimmer (born 1902)
- May 12 – Louis Zukofsky, modernist poet (born 1904)
- May 14 – Bill Lear, inventor and businessman (born 1902)
- May 16 – William Steinberg, conductor (born 1899)
- May 22
  - Joe Colombo, gangster (born 1923)
  - Aubrey Fitch, admiral (born 1883)
- June 3 – Frank Stanford, poet, suicide (born 1948)
- June 5 – Joseph Montoya, politician (born 1915)
- June 9 – Chief Tahachee, writer and actor (born 1904)
- June 18 – Walter C. Alvarez, physician and writer (born 1884)
- June 29 – Bob Crane, actor, drummer, disc jockey, and radio personality (born 1928)
- July 10 – John D. Rockefeller III, philanthropist (born 1906)
- July 18 – Claude P. Dettloff, photographer (born 1899)
- July 26 – Mary Blair, artist, animator, and designer (born 1911)
- July 31 – Enoch Light, violinist, danceband leader, recording engineer (born 1907)
- August 2 – Totie Fields, comedian (born 1930)
- August 4 – Frank Fontaine, comedian and singer (born 1920)
- August 5 – Queenie Smith, actress (born 1898)
- August 14 – Joe Venuti, jazz violinist (born 1903)
- August 21 – Charles Eames, architect and designer (born 1907)
- August 24
  - Louis Prima, swing singer and bandleader (born 1910)
  - Pat Paterson, actress (born 1910 in England)
- August 26 – Charles Boyer, film actor (born 1899 in France)
- August 27 – Gordon Matta-Clark, artist, cancer (born 1943)
- August 28 – Bruce Catton, Civil War historian, Pulitzer Prize winner in 1954 (born 1899)
- August 31 – Lee Garmes, cinematographer (born 1899)
- September 6 – Tom Wilson, record producer (born 1931)
- September 9 – Jack L. Warner, Canadian-American film executive (born 1892)
- September 11 – Mike Gazella, baseball player (born 1895)
- September 12 – Frank Ferguson, actor (born 1899)
- September 18 – Evelyn Berckman, novelist (born 1900)
- September 24
  - Lyman Bostock, baseball player, killed (born 1950)
  - Ruth Etting, "torch" singer (born 1896)
- September 30 – Edgar Bergen, actor and ventriloquist (born 1903)
- October 4 – Roy L. Dennis, American teenager with craniodiaphyseal dysplasia (born 1961)
- October 8
  - Bertha Parker Pallan, Native American archaeologist (born 1907)
  - Karl Swenson, actor (born 1908)
- October 10 – Ralph Metcalfe, sprinter and U.S. Congressman (born 1910)
- October 12 – Nancy Spungen, groupie and girlfriend of Sid Vicious, killed (born 1958)
- October 16
  - Dan Dailey, actor (born 1915)
  - Eddie Stumpf, baseball player (born 1894)
- October 19 – Gig Young, actor (born 1913)
- October 23 – Maybelle Carter, musician (born 1909)
- November 7
  - Cattle Annie, outlaw with Little Britches (born 1882)
  - Gene Tunney, professional boxer (born 1897)
- November 8 – Norman Rockwell, painter and illustrator (born 1894)
- November 15 – Margaret Mead, cultural anthropologist (born 1901)
- November 18
  - Jim Jones, American cult leader (born 1931)
  - Leo Ryan, politician (born 1925)
- November 25 – Elaine Esposito, coma victim (born 1934)
- November 27 – Harvey Milk, politician and gay activist, killed (born 1930)
- December 3 – William Grant Still, "the Dean" of African American composers (born 1895)
- December 10 – Ed Wood, American filmmaker, actor, writer, producer and director (born 1924)
- December 15 – Chill Wills, actor (born 1902)
- December 16 – Blanche Calloway, singer, composer, and bandleader (born 1902)
- December 17 – Don Ellis, musician and bandleader (born 1934)
- December 27 – Chris Bell, guitarist, singer and songwriter (born 1951)
- December 28 – Harry Winston, diamond dealer (born 1896)

== See also ==
- 1978 in American soccer
- 1978 in American television
- List of American films of 1978
- Timeline of United States history (1970–1989)
