= List of people from Waukegan, Illinois =

The following list includes notable people who were born or have lived in Waukegan, Illinois. For a similar list organized alphabetically by last name, see the category page People from Waukegan, Illinois.

== Artists and performers ==
- Harrison Bankhead, jazz double bassist
- Jack Benny, comedian, actor, iconic radio and television personality
- Landis Blair, artist (The Hunting Accident, From Here to Eternity.)
- David Clennon, actor (Thirtysomething)
- J. Campbell Cory, cartoonist
- Steve Di Giorgio, musician
- Greg Drasler, artist
- Lee England Jr., violinist, composer, producer, singer
- Neil Flynn, actor (Scrubs, The Middle)
- Jon Michael Hill, actor (Detroit 1-8-7, Superior Donuts)
- Jason Kao Hwang, violinist and composer
- Mickey Kuhn, film actor of 1930s-1950s
- Norm Magnusson, artist, actor
- Justin Mentell, actor
- Joshua Mallett, musician
- Lori Peters, musician and former drummer of Skillet (band)
- Jerry Orbach, actor (Law & Order, Dirty Dancing)
- Adam Pearce ("Scrap Iron"), professional wrestler for Ring of Honor and the National Wrestling Alliance and producer for World Wrestling Entertainment.
- Bryan W. Simon, film and stage director, Along for the Ride, I'm No Dummy, Jay Johnson: The Two & Only!, Stage Two Theatre Company
- Marvin Smith, drummer on The Tonight Show
- Greg and Colin Strause, directors and visual effects supervisors of Aliens vs. Predator: Requiem and Skyline.
- Brian Van Holt, actor

== Journalism and writing ==
- Diane Ackerman, author and naturalist
- Jim Bittermann, senior correspondent for CNN
- Eleanor Taylor Bland, crime fiction author
- Ray Bradbury, author, iconic science-fiction writer, wrote about 1920's Waukegan as "Green Town" in many of his novels and short stories
- James Grippando, New York Times best-selling novelist
- Isadore Gilbert Jeffery (1840-1919), poet, lyricist
- Ward Just, writer
- Kim Stanley Robinson, science-fiction writer; born in Waukegan in 1952

== Criminal justice ==
- Juan Rivera, wrongfully convicted of the 1992 murder of Holly Staker in Waukegan
- Alton Coleman, serial killer

== Politicians and law ==
- Jack E. Bairstow, Illinois legislator
- Reuben W. Coon, Illinois state senator
- Robert E. Coulson, Illinois legislator, lawyer, and mayor of Waukegan
- Doris A. Davis, first African American female mayor of Compton, California.
- Elisha P. Ferry, first mayor of Waukegan, first governor of state of Washington
- Vic Kohring, Alaska legislator
- Thomas J. Moran, Chief Justice of the Illinois Supreme Court
- Kim Olson, military officer and political candidate
- Charles E. Redman, United States ambassador to Sweden and Germany

== Sports ==
=== Baseball ===
- Gary Bennett, catcher for the Los Angeles Dodgers
- Jarvis Brown, outfielder for the Minnesota Twins, San Diego Padres, Atlanta Braves and Baltimore Orioles
- Johnny Dickshot, outfielder for with Pittsburgh Pirates, New York Giants and Chicago White Sox
- Eric Eckenstahler, pitcher for the Detroit Tigers
- Jay Hook, pitcher for the Cincinnati Reds and New York Mets (winning pitcher in the first ever victory for the New York Mets)
- Bill Krueger, pitcher for eight MLB teams
- Ernie Krueger, was the catcher for the Brooklyn Robins in the "longest game in baseball history"–27 innings.
- Jerry Kutzler, pitcher for the Chicago White Sox
- Doc Oberlander, pitcher for the Cleveland Blues
- Bob O'Farrell, catcher for the Chicago Cubs, St. Louis Cardinals and New York Giants, World Series champion, National League MVP and manager
- Ed Sedar, first base coach for the Milwaukee Brewers
- Scott Stahoviak, first baseman for the Minnesota Twins
- Jigger Statz, outfielder for the Chicago Cubs, New York Giants, Boston Red Sox and Brooklyn Robins
- Brian Traxler, first baseman for the Los Angeles Dodgers
- Renae Youngberg, third basewoman in the All-American Girls Professional Baseball League

=== Basketball ===
- Shawn Marion, small and power forward for the Phoenix Suns, Miami Heat, Toronto Raptors, and Dallas Mavericks
- Billy McKinney, retired professional basketball player and former radio broadcaster
- Jerome Whitehead, center and power forward for several NBA teams

=== Football ===
- Otto Graham, award-winning quarterback for the Cleveland Browns
- Brian Schwenke current offensive lineman for the New England Patriots, born in Waukegan
- Michael Turner, running back for the Atlanta Falcons
- Mike Wagner, safety with the Pittsburgh Steelers; four time Super Bowl champion (IX, X, XIII, XIV)

=== Motorsports ===
- John Morton, Champion Trans Am Series driver
- Ted Musgrave, American former stock car racing driver

=== Other ===
- Rick Bay, served as head wrestling coach for Michigan (1970–74), and was later a college athletic director and professional sports executive

== Other ==
- Richard E. Bush (1924–2004), Master Gunnery Sergeant in the United States Marine Corps and awardee of the Medal of Honor as a corporal for heroism on Okinawa during World War II. He resided in Waukegan in 1999.
- Althea Warren, president of the American Library Association, 1943–44
- Nick Erickson, Vice President Integrated Specialty Contractors. Born in Waukegan, IL.
