= Robert McClory =

American politician (1908–1988)

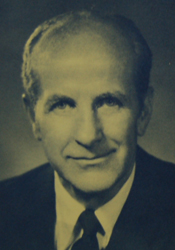

Member of the U.S. House of Representatives from Illinois
- In office January 3, 1963 – January 3, 1983
- Preceded by: District established (redistricting)
- Succeeded by: John Porter (redistricting)
- Constituency: 12th district (1963–1973); 13th district (1973–1983)

Member of the Illinois Senate from the 52nd district
- In office January 9, 1957 – January 3, 1963
- Preceded by: Constituency established
- Succeeded by: Robert E. Coulson

Member of the Illinois Senate from the 8th district
- In office January 14, 1953 – January 9, 1957
- Preceded by: Ray Paddock
- Succeeded by: Hayes Robertson

Member of the Illinois House of Representatives from the 8th district
- In office January 10, 1951 – January 14, 1953 Serving with Thomas A. Bolger, Harvey Pearson
- Preceded by: J. Nick Keller
- Succeeded by: Jack E. Bairstow; A. B. McConnell

Personal details
- Born: January 31, 1908 Riverside, Illinois, U.S.
- Died: July 24, 1988 (aged 80) Washington, D.C., U.S.
- Party: Republican
- Education: Dartmouth College; Chicago-Kent College of Law (LLB)

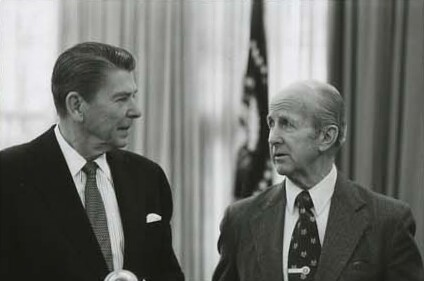
McClory with President Ronald Reagan in 1981

Robert McClory (January 31, 1908 – July 24, 1988) was an American politician and member of the U.S. House of Representatives from Illinois.

== Early life ==
McClory was born on January 31, 1908, in Riverside, Illinois. He attended the public schools, L'Institut Sillig, Vevey, Switzerland from 1925 to 1926, and Dartmouth College in Hanover, New Hampshire from 1926 to 1928. He graduated from Chicago–Kent College of Law in 1932. He was admitted to the bar in 1932 and thereafter engaged in the practice of law in state and federal courts in Cook and Lake counties. He was the village attorney of Lake Bluff, Illinois, and was the ScoutMaster of Lake Bluff Boy Scout Troop 42. He served in the United States Marine Corps Reserve from 1933 to 1937.

== Political career ==
McClory was elected to the Illinois House of Representatives in 1950 and to the Illinois Senate in 1952, 1956, and 1960. McClory voted in favor of the Civil Rights Acts of 1964 and 1968, as well as the Voting Rights Act of 1965. McClory was the sole Republican in the state's congressional delegation to vote in favor of the Medicare program.

McClory was one of seven Republicans on the House Judiciary Committee to vote for articles of impeachment against President Richard Nixon.

McClory was elected as a Republican to the Eighty-eighth and to the nine succeeding Congresses (January 3, 1963 – January 3, 1983). He was not a candidate for reelection to the Ninety-ninth Congress. He resumed the practice of law in Washington, D.C. He was United States delegate to the Inter-Parliamentary Union Conference from 1963 to 1982, and honorary delegate, 1983 to 1988. He was a resident of Washington, D.C., until his death there on July 24, 1988. There is a bike path in Lake County, IL named after him in 1997.

Illinois House of Representatives
Preceded by J. Nick Keller	Member of the Illinois House of Representatives from the 8th district 1951–1953; Served alongside: Thomas A. Bolger, Harvey Pearson	Succeeded by Jack E. Bairstow; A. B. McConnell
Illinois Senate
Preceded by Ray Paddock	Member of the Illinois Senate from the 8th district 1953–1957	Succeeded by Hayes Robertson
Preceded by Constituency established	Member of the Illinois Senate from the 52nd district 1957–1963	Succeeded by Robert E. Coulson
U.S. House of Representatives
Preceded by Edward Rowan Finnegan	Member of the U.S. House of Representatives from Illinois's 12th congressional district 1963–1973	Succeeded by Phil Crane
Preceded by Phil Crane	Member of the U.S. House of Representatives from Illinois's 13th congressional district 1973–1983	Succeeded by John N. Erlenborn
Preceded by J. Edward Hutchinson	Ranking Member of the House Judiciary Committee; 1977–1983	Succeeded by Hamilton Fish IV
