= Señor Wences =

Spanish ventriloquist (1896–1999)

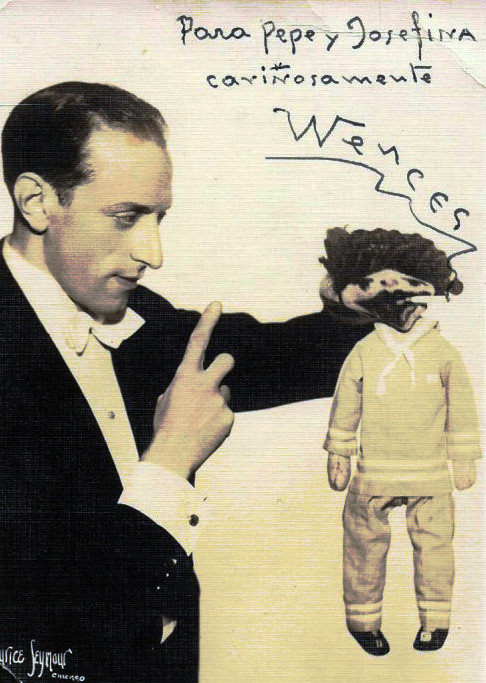
- Señor Wences in 1935 with an early version of "Johnny"
- Born: Wenceslao Moreno Centeno; April 17, 1896; Peñaranda de Bracamonte, Salamanca, Spain
- Died: April 20, 1999 (aged 103); New York City, U.S.
- Occupations: Ventriloquist, comedian
- Years active: 1911–1996
- Spouses: Esperanza Martín Caballero (m. 1922; div. 1944) Natalie Cover Eisler (m. 1951)
- Relatives: José Luis Moreno (producer) (nephew)

Wenceslao Moreno Centeno (April 17, 1896 – April 20, 1999), known professionally as Señor Wences (Spanish pronunciation: [se'ɲoɾ 'wenθes]), was a Spanish ventriloquist and comedian. His popularity grew with his frequent television appearances on CBS's The Ed Sullivan Show during the 1950s and 1960s. Later, he became popular with another generation of fans on The Muppet Show.

== Early life ==
Wenceslao Moreno Centeno was born in Peñaranda de Bracamonte, Salamanca. His mother was Josefa Centeno Lavera and his father was Antonio Moreno Ros. His mother was born in the province of Salamanca. His family on both sides were Roman Catholic.

At age 15, he learned how to juggle. He then joined a circus act of some friends.

Throughout his career, he maintained a residence in Salamanca, vacationing there every summer. He became one of the benefactors of the Convent of Saint Teresa of Avila (1515–1582) in Alba de Tormes, Salamanca, at which he attended Mass every Sunday when there. The street that leads to the convent received the name of Señor Wences while he was alive. Several other places in Salamanca and in Castille have streets named for him.

== Career ==
Performing under the stage name "Señor Wences", Moreno was known for his speed, skill, and grace as a ventriloquist. His stable of characters included "Johnny", a childlike face drawn on his hand, placed atop an otherwise headless doll, with whom the ventriloquist conversed while switching voices between Johnny's falsetto and his own voice with great speed. He opened his act by drawing Johnny's face on his hand, on stage. He would first place his thumb next to, and in front of, his bent first finger; the first finger would be the upper lip, and the thumb the lower lip. He used lipstick to draw the lips onto the respective fingers and then drew eyes onto the upper part of the first finger, finishing the effect with a tiny long-haired wig on top of his hand. Flexing the thumb would move the "lips". Moreno performed a scene using Johnny in the 1947 musical Mother Wore Tights. The inspiration for Johnny came from his school days when the teacher punished him for imitating classmates and answering "present" when they were absent. His punishment was to clean the inkwells and he smeared some of the ink on his hand, then clenched his fist to create the face.

Another popular Señor Wences character was the gruff-voiced "Pedro", a disembodied head in a box. Señor Wences was forced suddenly to invent the character when his regular, full-sized dummy was destroyed during a 1936 train accident en route to Chicago. Pedro would either "speak" from within the closed box, or speak with moving lips – simply answering "s'awright" ("it's all right") – when the performer opened the box's front panel with his free hand to ask questions of Pedro. A large part of the entertainer's comedy lay in the well-timed, high-speed exchange of dialogue between him and his creations, because of the difference in their voice pitches.

Part of his act involved throwing his voice while his mouth was otherwise engaged (i.e., smoking or drinking), and rapidly switching between multiple voices. Another favorite prop was a telephone, with the ventriloquist playing both sides of a telephone conversation. For the "caller" he simulated a "filtered" voice, as it would sound over a telephone wire to a bystander. This voice always began a conversation with a shouted "Moreno?" – using the true surname of Señor Wences, who would respond "No, Moreno is not here."

He usually built up to a big finish that combined ventriloquism with juggling and plate-spinning. As he performed his routines, Pedro and Johnny would heckle him.

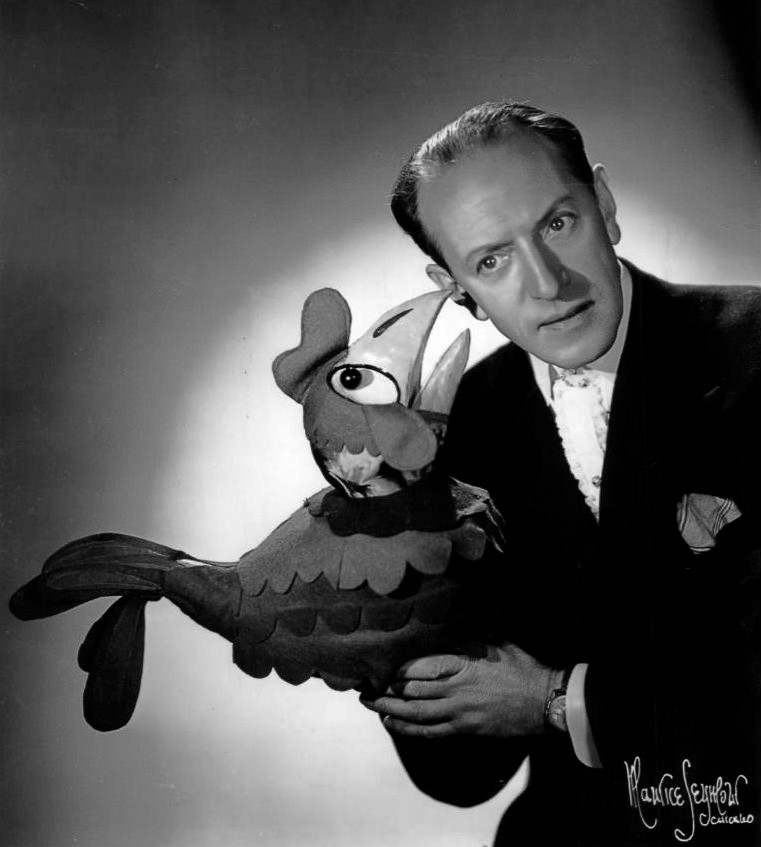
Señor Wences with another of his puppet characters, "Cecilia Chicken", in 1962

Although he was an international favorite for decades, his main career was made in the United States, where he arrived in 1934 or 1935. In addition to live performances at nightclubs, he appeared regularly on television variety shows, including frequent appearances on CBS's The Ed Sullivan Show, where he was a guest 48 times. He also performed on Broadway, in Las Vegas casino theaters, in feature films, and made an appearance on The Dusty Springfield Show in 1966.

Much later in his career he was introduced to a new generation of fans when he was a featured guest during season 5 of The Muppet Show. He also made a 1982 appearance on Late Night with David Letterman. In the early 1980s, a Tri-state Honda dealer's commercial featured Señor Wences with Johnny. Pedro's "s'awright" was a voice from the elaborate glovebox. Señor Wences would point out all of the features of the automobile to which Johnny would reply, "Ees Standard", "Stan-dard!", and "Nice!" This may have been the final commercial appearance of Señor Wences. It was shot in Puerto Rico because its star declined to travel to New York. Tony Belmont, at the time the president of Alan Freed Productions, was his agent and manager throughout the 1980s, and he secured Señor Wences a spot performing at Ruth Eckerd Hall, among many others. In 1986, he made a guest appearance on The Garry Shandling Show. His last television appearance was on The Very Best of the Ed Sullivan Show #2, a retrospective in which the nonagenarian talked about "Suliban" and performed a brief spot of ventriloquism.

He pronounced his professional name using traditional Castilian, which in English sounds like "WEN-thess". After Sullivan would announce him, mispronouncing his name as "Señor Wen-sess", the ventriloquist would correct Sullivan's pronunciation subtly, by introducing himself to the audience: "Hello, I am Señor Wen-thess".

In 2009 Señor Wences was featured in the ventriloquist comedy documentary I'm No Dummy, directed by Bryan W. Simon.

=== Catchphrases ===
One of the Señor Wences trademark bits of shtick (referenced several times below) involved his dialogue with a deep voice emanating from inside a box. At the opening of the dialogue he would shout, "Hello in the box!" At the conclusion of the dialogue, he would open the lid of the box and ask "S'ok?" ("It's ok?") and the box voice would answer "S'ariiight!" immediately after which Señor Wences would shut the lid of the box. In 1959, the phrase was adapted for use in the closing credits for the Hanna-Barbera cartoon show Quick Draw McGraw where sidekick Baba Looey, trapped inside a chest, falls off a stagecoach driven by Quick-Draw whose shout "Hey Baba Looey" is met by the response "S'awright".

Another routine involved explaining to his hand puppet Johnny that something was easy (or difficult) to do, to which the puppet always would reply the contrary, such as, "Easy for you, for me ees very deefeecult!" in his Spanish accent. These catchphrases were incorporated into a record Señor Wences released in 1959 by Joy Records (New York), featuring the songs "S-All Right? S-All Right" and "Deefeecult For You – Easy For Me".

== Death and legacy ==
Moreno received the Lifetime Achievement Award from the US National Comedy Hall of Fame in 1996. The ceremony was immortalized via video through the National Comedy Hall of Fame.

Despite his retirement by age 100, the famous Señor Wences puppets, Johnny and Pedro, "continued working". Ventriloquists Jay Johnson, Rickie Layne, and Michele LaFong performed at Moreno's 100th birthday celebration at the New York Friars' Club (where he was made a lifetime member), and he was so impressed with LaFong that he befriended her. Not only did he give his puppets to her, but he also taught her how to perform his classic routines. Las Vegas headliner Michele LaFong continued to perform Señor Wences routines after the performer's death, using some of the original characters. Another famous ventriloquist who was present at Señor Wences' birthday party, and who met him there for the first time, was Paul Winchell.

Moreno died on April 20, 1999, three days after his 103rd birthday. He had been residing in Midtown Manhattan on 54th Street, just around the corner from the Ed Sullivan Theater. That section of 54th Street has been named Señor Wences Way. His portrait can be seen at the Players Club in New York.

His nephew José Luis Moreno started as a ventriloquist, achieving fame in Spain and Italy and became a show producer.
