= Senator Paddock =

Senator Paddock may refer to:

- Algernon Paddock (1830–1897), United States Senator from Nebraska from 1875 to 1881
- Francis Paddock (1814–1889), Wisconsin State Senate
- Ray Paddock (1877–1953), Illinois State Senate

== See also ==
- Susan Paddack (fl. 2000s–2010s), Oklahoma State Senate
