= Willie Tyler =

American comedian and actor (born 1940)

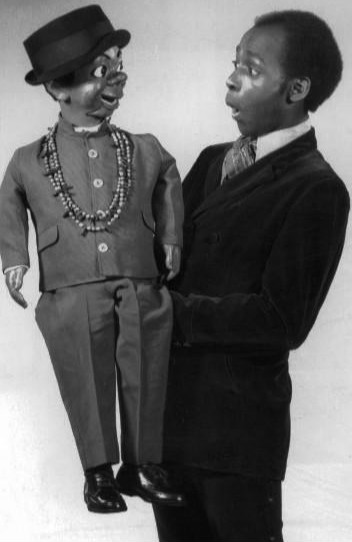
- Willie Tyler and Lester, 1969
- Born: September 8, 1940 (age 86); Red Level, Alabama, U.S.
- Occupations: Ventriloquist; comedian; actor
- Years active: 1969–present

Willie Tyler (born September 8, 1940) is an American ventriloquist, comedian and actor. He has been credited as Willie Tyler and Lester or Willie Tyler & Lester. Tyler recorded the album Hello Dummy for Motown Records, released in 1965. He also recorded Cannibal for Motown in 1968, but it was not released. He has appeared in many television commercials, sitcoms and films. Tyler got his first big break in 1972 on Rowan & Martin's Laugh-In.

== Appearances ==
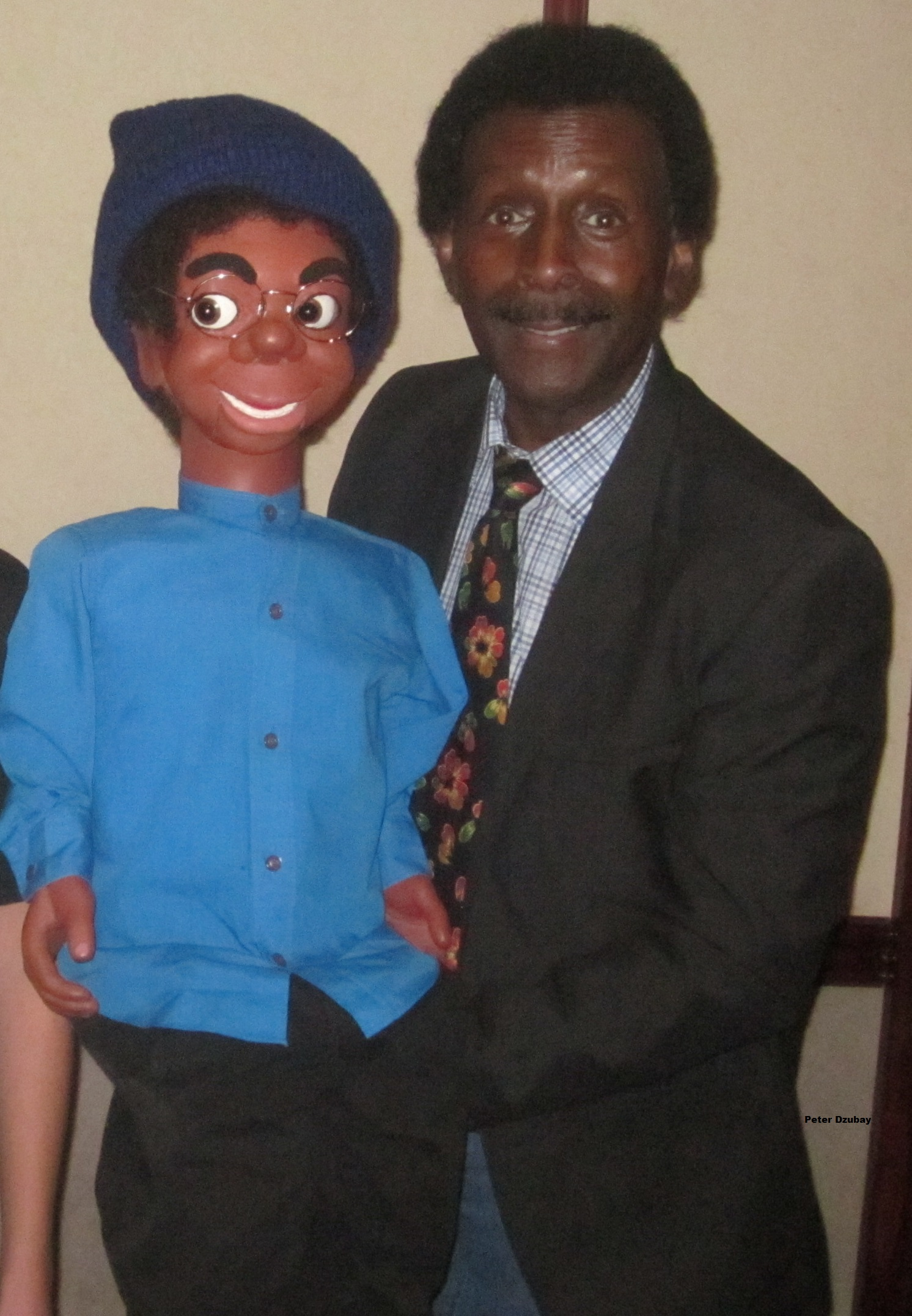
Willie Tyler and Lester in July 2014

The duo made an early appearance at the Harlem Cultural Festival in the summer of 1969, and can be briefly seen in the 2021 documentary Summer of Soul.

Tyler has had guest roles in The Parent 'Hood, Pacific Blue, What's Happening Now!!, The White Shadow and The Jeffersons, as well as serving as host of the Saturday morning children's anthology series ABC Weekend Specials throughout the early 1980s. He appeared in the 1978 film Coming Home. Tyler has also appeared in television commercials for McDonald's, Toyota and Maxwell House.

He appeared as himself in the 2004 BET Comedy Awards, Frank McKlusky, C.I., For Da Love of Money, In the House, the 4th Annual Black Gold Awards, The 1st Annual Soul Train Music Awards, Motown Returns to the Apollo, Lou Rawls Parade of Stars, Powerhouse, The White Shadow, American Bandstand, The Electric Company, Vegetable Soup, The Flip Wilson Show, The Super Dave Osborne Show, The Statler Brothers Show, The Hollywood Palace, Match Game and Family Feud.

On September 18, 2006, Tyler was the first ventriloquist to appear on the Late Show with David Letterman's Ventriloquist Week. In 2009, Willie Tyler and Lester were featured in the ventriloquist comedy documentary I'm No Dummy, directed by Bryan W. Simon. On May 21, 2019, Tyler appeared as a 1972 TV version of himself on the ABC sitcom The Kids are Alright.

In August 2024, Willie Tyler and Lester appeared in the Adam Sandler: Love You special on Netflix.
