= Edgar Bergen =

American ventriloquist, comedian and actor (1903–1978)

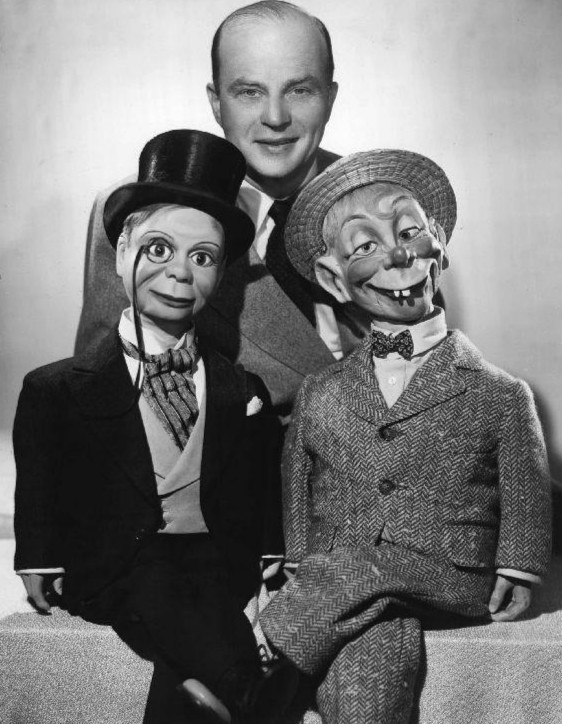
- Bergen with his dummies Charlie McCarthy (left) and Mortimer Snerd in 1949
- Born: Edgar John Berggren; February 16, 1903; Chicago, Illinois, U.S.
- Died: September 30, 1978 (aged 75); Paradise, Nevada, U.S.
- Resting place: Inglewood Park Cemetery
- Occupations: Ventriloquist; comedian; actor; vaudevillian; radio performer
- Years active: 1919–1978
- Spouse: Frances Westerman (m. 1945)
- Children: 2; including Candice
- Relatives: Chloe Malle (granddaughter)

Edgar John Bergen (né Berggren; February 16, 1903 – September 30, 1978) was an American ventriloquist, comedian, actor, vaudevillian and radio performer. He was best known for his characters Charlie McCarthy and Mortimer Snerd. Bergen pioneered modern-day ventriloquism and has been described by puppetry organization UNIMA as the “quintessential ventriloquist of the 20th century”. He was the father of actress Candice Bergen.

== Early life ==
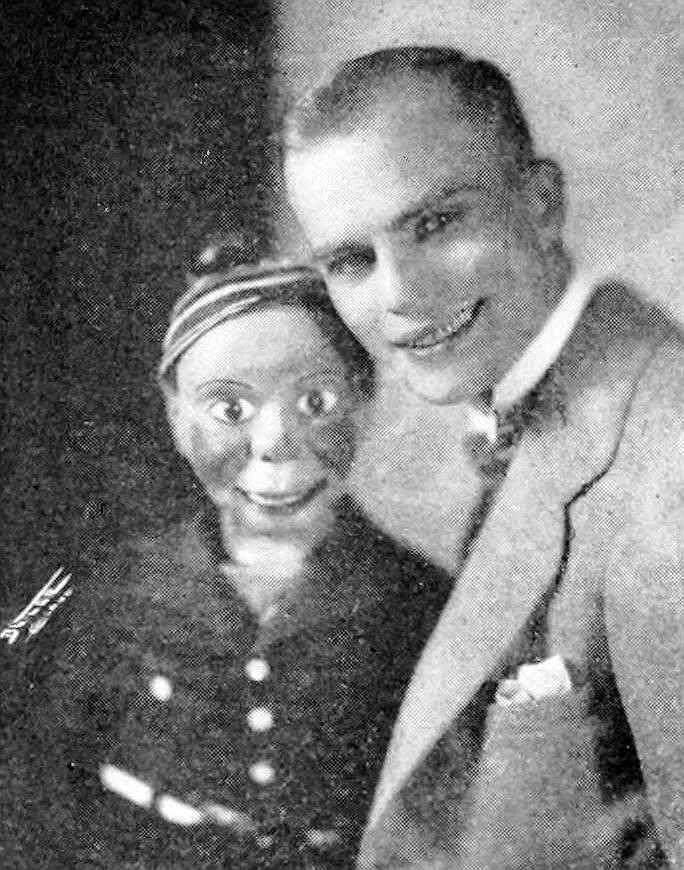
Bergen and Charlie in 1926

Bergen was born in Chicago, one of five children and the younger of two sons of Swedish immigrants Nilla Svensdotter (née Osberg) and Johan Henriksson Berggren. He lived on a farm near Decatur, Michigan until he was four, when his family returned to Sweden, where he learned the language. After his family had returned to Chicago, when he was eleven, he taught himself ventriloquism from a pamphlet called "The Wizard's Manual". He attended Lake View High School. After his father died, when Edgar was 16, he went out to work as an apprentice accountant, a furnace stoker, a player-piano operator, and a projectionist in a silent-movie house.

Edgar so impressed the famous ventriloquist Harry Lester that he gave the teenager almost daily lessons for three months in the fundamentals of ventriloquism. In the fall of 1919, Edgar paid Chicago woodcarver Theodore Mack $36 ($688.59 in 2025) to sculpt a likeness of a rascally red-headed Irish newspaper boy he knew. The head went on a dummy named Charlie McCarthy, which became Bergen's lifelong sidekick. He had created the body himself, using a nine-inch length of broomstick for the backbone, and rubber bands and cords to control the lower jaw mechanism of the mouth.

For college, he attended Northwestern University, where he enrolled in the pre-med program to please his mother. He later switched to speech and drama, but never completed his degree. He gave his first public performance at Waveland Avenue Congregational Church located on the northeast corner of Waveland and Janssen. He lived across the street from the church. In 1965, he gave the church a generous contribution, a thoughtful letter, and a photograph of himself which had been requested by the minister and was displayed in the church's assembly room which was dedicated to Bergen. He cut out an "R" and a "G" from his family name and went from Berggren to Bergen on the showbills. Between June 1922 and August 1925, he performed every summer on the professional Chautauqua circuit and at the Lyceum theater in Chicago. Bergen had an interest in aviation, becoming a private pilot.

== The Chase and Sanborn Hour ==
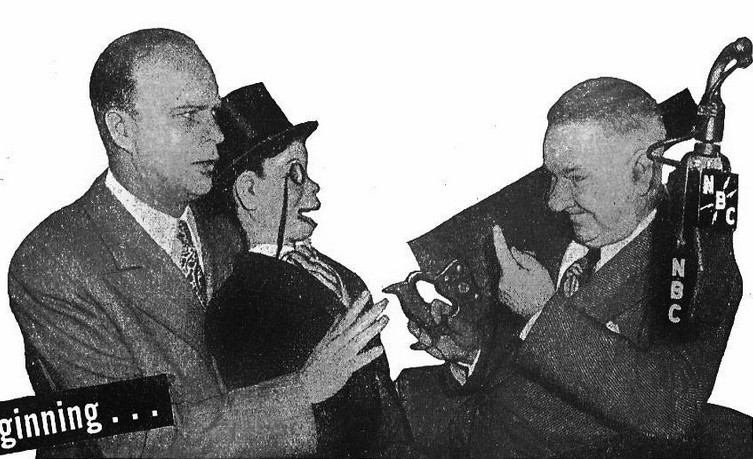
Edgar Bergen and his dummy Charlie McCarthy with W. C. Fields on The Chase and Sanborn Hour

His first performances were in vaudeville, at which point he legally changed his last name to the easier-to-pronounce "Bergen". He worked in one-reel movie shorts, but his real success was on the radio. He and Charlie were seen at a New York party by Elsa Maxwell for Noël Coward, who recommended them for an engagement at the famous Rainbow Room. It was there that two producers saw Bergen and Charlie perform. They then recommended them for a guest appearance on Rudy Vallée's program.

Their initial appearance (December 17, 1936) was so successful that the following year they were given regular cast roles as part of The Chase and Sanborn Hour. Under various sponsors (and two different networks), they were on the air from May 9, 1937, to July 1, 1956. The popularity of a ventriloquist on radio, when one could see neither the dummies nor his skill, surprised and puzzled many critics, then and now. Even knowing that Bergen provided the voice, listeners perceived Charlie as a genuine person. In 1947, Sam Berman caricatured Bergen and McCarthy for the network's glossy promotional book, NBC Parade of Stars: As Heard Over Your Favorite NBC Station.

Bergen's skill as an entertainer, especially his characterization of Charlie, carried the show (many recordings of which have survived). Bergen's success on radio was paralleled in the United Kingdom by Peter Brough and his dummy Archie Andrews (Educating Archie).

For the radio program, Bergen developed other characters, notably the slow-witted Mortimer Snerd and the man-hungry Effie Klinker. The star remained Charlie, who was always presented as a highly precocious child (albeit in top hat, cape, and monocle)—a debonair, girl-crazy, child-about-town. As a child, and a wooden one at that, Charlie could get away with double entendres which were otherwise impossible under broadcast standards of the time.

Charlie: "May I have a kiss good-bye?"
Dale Evans: "Well, I can't see any harm in that!"
Charlie: "Oh. I wish you could. A harmless kiss doesn't sound very thrilling."

Charlie and Mae West had this conversation in 1937.

Charlie: "Not so loud, Mae, not so loud! All my girlfriends are listening."
Mae: "Oh, yeah! You're all wood and a yard long."
Charlie: "Yeah."
Mae: "You weren't so nervous and backward when you came up to see me at my apartment. In fact, you didn't need any encouragement to kiss me."
Charlie: "Did I do that?"
Mae: "Why, you certainly did. I got marks to prove it. An' splinters, too."

Charlie's feud with W. C. Fields was a regular feature of the show.

W. C. Fields: "Well, if it isn't Charlie McCarthy, the woodpecker's pinup boy!"

Charlie: "Well, if it isn't W.C. Fields, the man who keeps Seagram's in business!"

W. C. Fields: "I love children. I can remember when, with my own little unsteady legs, I toddled from room to room."
Charlie: "When was that? Last night?"

W. C. Fields: "Quiet, Wormwood, or I'll whittle you into a venetian blind."
Charlie: "Ooh, that makes me shutter!"

W. C. Fields: "Tell me, Charles, is it true that your father was a gate-leg table?"
Charlie: "If it is, your father was under it."

W. C. Fields: "Why, you stunted spruce, I'll throw a Japanese beetle on you."
Charlie: "Why, you bar-fly you, I'll stick a wick in your mouth, and use you for an alcohol lamp!"

Charlie: "Pink elephants take aspirin to get rid of W. C. Fields."

W.C. Fields: "Step out of the sun Charles. You may come unglued."
Charlie: "Mind if I stand in the shade of your nose?"

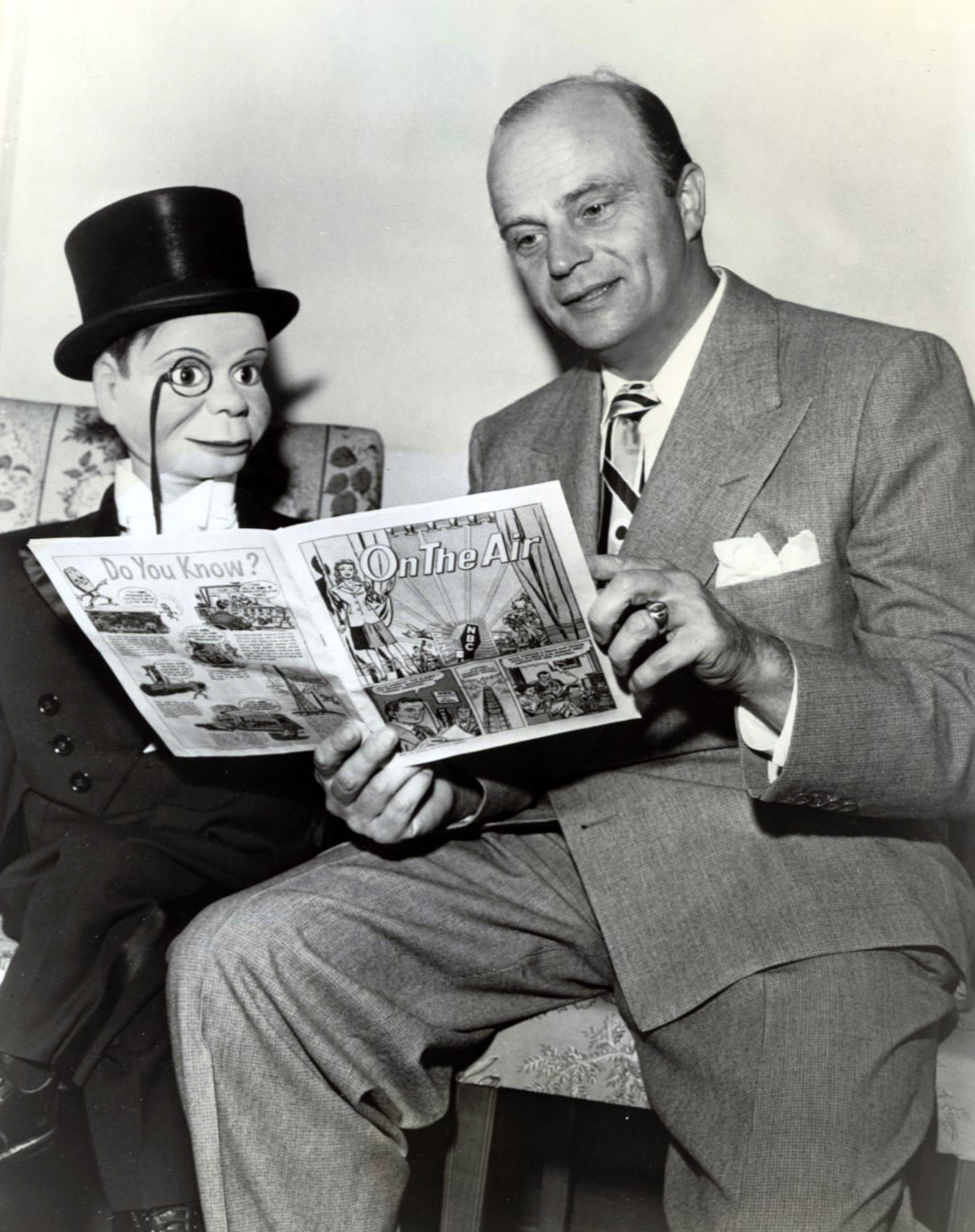
Bergen and Charlie with an NBC-produced comic book On the Air, 1947

Bergen was not a technically skilled ventriloquist, and Charlie McCarthy frequently twitted him for moving his lips. However, Bergen's sense of comedic timing was superb, and he handled Charlie's snappy dialog with aplomb. Bergen's wit in creating McCarthy's striking personality and that of his other characters was the making of the show. Bergen's popularity as a ventriloquist on radio, where the trick of "throwing his voice" was not visible, suggests his appeal was primarily the personality he applied to his characters.

Bergen and McCarthy are sometimes credited with "saving the world" because, on the night of October 30, 1938, when Orson Welles performed his War of the Worlds radio play that panicked many listeners, most of the American public had instead tuned to Bergen and McCarthy on another station and never heard Welles' play. Conversely, it has also been theorized that Bergen inadvertently contributed to the hysteria. When the musical portion of Bergen's show, The Chase and Sanborn Hour, aired approximately 12 minutes into the show, many listeners adjusted their dial and found the War of the Worlds presentation already underway with a realistic-sounding reporter detailing terrible events.

Ray Noble was the musical director and composer, and teenage singer Anita Gordon provided the songs on his show. Gordon was said to have been discovered by Charlie, who had a crush on her.

In the fall (autumn) of 1948, Edgar and Charlie faced serious competition from ABC's "jackpot" quiz show, Stop the Music, which suddenly drew more listeners (Fred Allen faced a similar problem because he directly appeared before them). In December 1948, Edgar announced he was temporarily "retiring" from radio, admitting that Stop the Music was too popular to compete with. His final NBC broadcast was on December 26, 1948.

== The Charlie McCarthy Show ==
In October 1949, Bergen went to CBS, with a new weekly program, The Charlie McCarthy Show, sponsored by Coca-Cola. After their sponsorship ended in June 1952, Warner-Hudnut, Inc., on behalf of "Lanolin Plus" cosmetics, primarily sponsored the series until the end of the 1953–54 season. In October 1954, Kraft Foods sponsored a new Edgar Bergen Hour. After Kraft's departure, the series continued with participating sponsors as a 55-minute series in the fall of 1955. However, because more people were watching television on Sunday nights than listened to radio (and advertisers preferred to sponsor TV shows by then), the series finally ended on July 1, 1956.

== Comic strip ==
In addition to his work as a ventriloquist, Bergen was also an actor and comic strip creator. He established the syndicated comic strip Mortimer and Charlie, which ran in newspapers from July 10, 1939, to May 1940, illustrated first by Ben Batsford and then by Carl Buettner. The comic strip's writer was uncredited, but some of the gags certainly were lifted from the hit radio show. Between 1947 and 1954 Harvey Eisenberg also drew a comic strip based on Charlie McCarthy, scripted by Bergen.

== Films ==
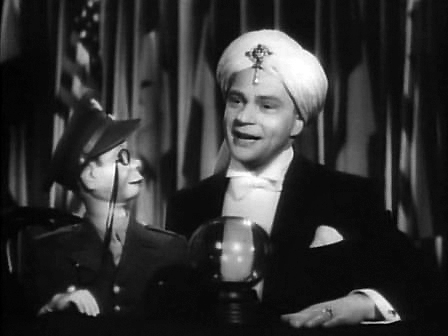
In the film Stage Door Canteen (1943) with Charlie McCarthy

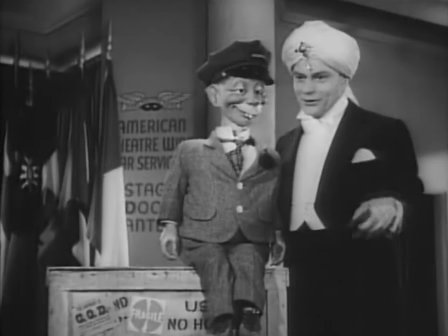
In the film Stage Door Canteen (1943) with Mortimer Snerd

Bergen in a Vitaphone Varieties short, Free and Easy (1931)

Bergen and his alter ego Charlie McCarthy were given top billing in several films, including the Technicolor extravaganza The Goldwyn Follies (1938), opposite the Ritz Brothers. That year they also appeared in You Can't Cheat an Honest Man with W. C. Fields. At the height of their popularity in 1937, Bergen was presented an Honorary Oscar (in the form of a wooden Oscar statuette, the only wooden Oscar given so far) for his creation of Charlie McCarthy. Bergen, along with Charlie McCarthy and Mortimer Snerd, was also featured in the 1938 film Letter of Introduction.

As an actor alone, Bergen portrayed the timid suitor of the sister Trina in I Remember Mama (1948), and appeared in Captain China (1949), The Hanged Man (1964) and Don't Make Waves (1967). Other film roles for the team include Look Who's Laughing (1941) and Here We Go Again (1942), both with Fibber McGee and Molly. Charlie McCarthy wore a US Army uniform in Stage Door Canteen (1943) with Mortimer Snerd. Bergen, McCarthy and Snerd were also featured in Walt Disney's Fun and Fancy Free (1947). He later cameoed in all-star films such as The Phynx (1970), Won Ton Ton, the Dog Who Saved Hollywood (1976), and The Muppet Movie (1979). In 1977, Bergen had made a guest appearance on a second-season episode of The Muppet Show, the highly acclaimed television comedy/variety program produced by Jim Henson who considered Bergen a major inspiration. His daughter Candice had also guest-starred on the show during its first season. Bergen died shortly after filming his Muppet Movie scene, which was also his final public appearance, and was subsequently dedicated to him. In 2009 Bergen was featured in the comedy documentary I'm No Dummy, directed by Bryan W. Simon.

== Television appearances ==
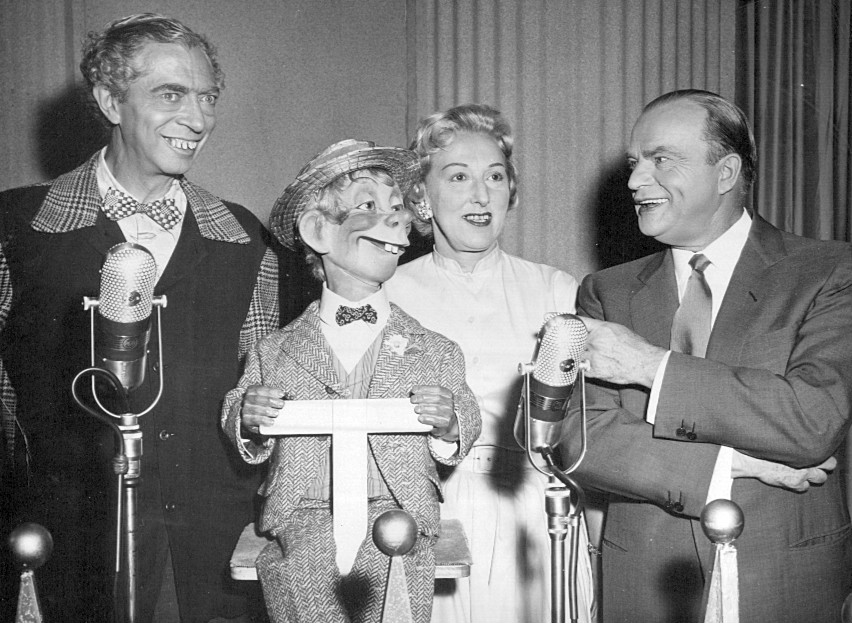
Bergen interviewing an actual Mortimer Snerd doppelganger in 1956 on the game show Who Do You Trust?

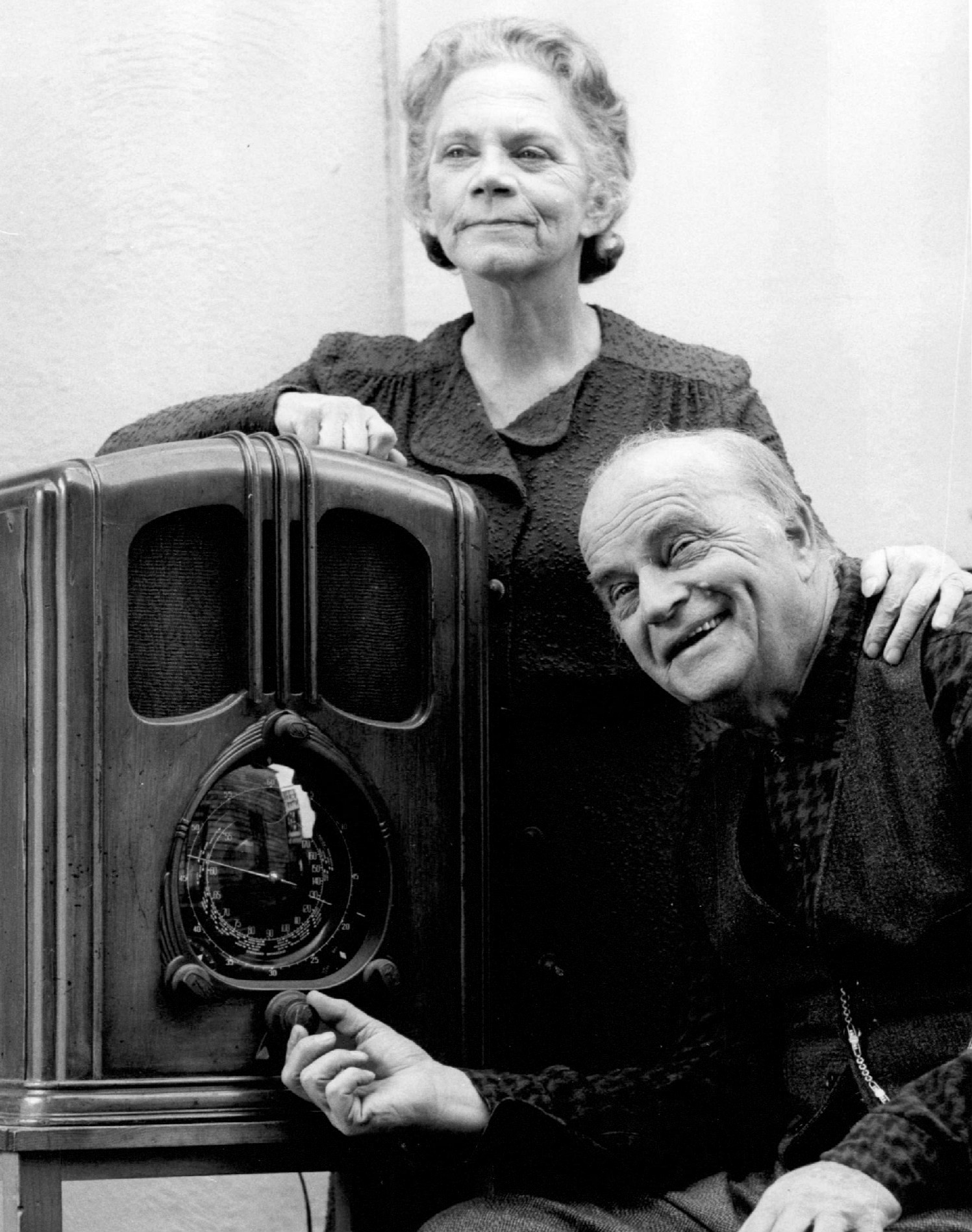
Bergen with Ellen Corby in The Homecoming: A Christmas Story

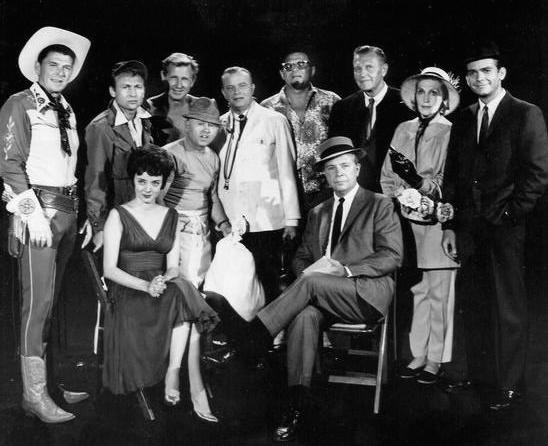
Guest stars for the 1961 premiere episode of The Dick Powell Show, "Who Killed Julie Greer?" Standing, from left: Ronald Reagan, Nick Adams, Lloyd Bridges, Mickey Rooney, Edgar Bergen, Jack Carson, Ralph Bellamy, Kay Thompson, Dean Jones. Seated, from left, Carolyn Jones and Dick Powell.

Although his regular series never made the transition to television, Bergen made numerous appearances on the medium during his career. His first appearance was with Charlie McCarthy on NBC's pioneering television variety show Hour Glass in November 1946. In a filmed Thanksgiving special, billed as his official TV debut, sponsored by Coca-Cola on CBS in 1950, the new character Podine Puffington was introduced; this saucy Southern belle was as tall as a real woman, in contrast to Bergen's other sit-on-the-knee sized characters. On Christmas Day that same year, Bergen and McCarthy appeared as guests on Walt Disney's first television show, One Hour in Wonderland.

In 1954, Bergen was a co-host on a memorable TV musical special, General Foods 25th Anniversary Show: A Salute to Rodgers and Hammerstein.

On December 26, 1954, Bergen appeared on What's My Line as a mystery guest. Bergen also hosted the television game show Do You Trust Your Wife? in 1956–1957, later succeeded, in a daytime edition, by Johnny Carson.

He appeared in the Christmas 1957 episode of NBC's The Gisele MacKenzie Show. In 1958, Bergen appeared with his 12-year-old daughter Candice on an episode of You Bet Your Life starring Groucho Marx. In 1959, he appeared in the second episode titled "Dossier" of the NBC espionage series Five Fingers starring David Hedison. On May 21, 1959, he guest-starred with Charlie McCarthy on NBC's The Ford Show, Starring Tennessee Ernie Ford. Bergen continued to appear regularly on television during the 1960s and into the 1970s, appearing on The Tonight Show Starring Johnny Carson as late as 1977. He guest-starred as Charlie in the 1960 episode "Moment of Fear" of CBS's The DuPont Show with June Allyson. He did a stint as one of the What's My Line? mystery guests on the popular Sunday night CBS series. His colleague Paul Winchell happened to be a panel member during that episode. Bergen appeared on the NBC interview program Here's Hollywood.

Bergen appeared as Grandpa Zeb Walton in the original Waltons television movie, The Homecoming: A Christmas Story (1971). The role was played by Will Geer in the subsequent TV series. During the run of The Waltons—which took place throughout the 1930s and 1940s—the voices of Bergen and Charlie McCarthy were sporadically heard from the Waltons' radio, as family members regularly tuned in for that program.

He appeared on The Muppet Show in Season 2. His daughter, Candice Bergen had appeared in Season 1.

== Family ==
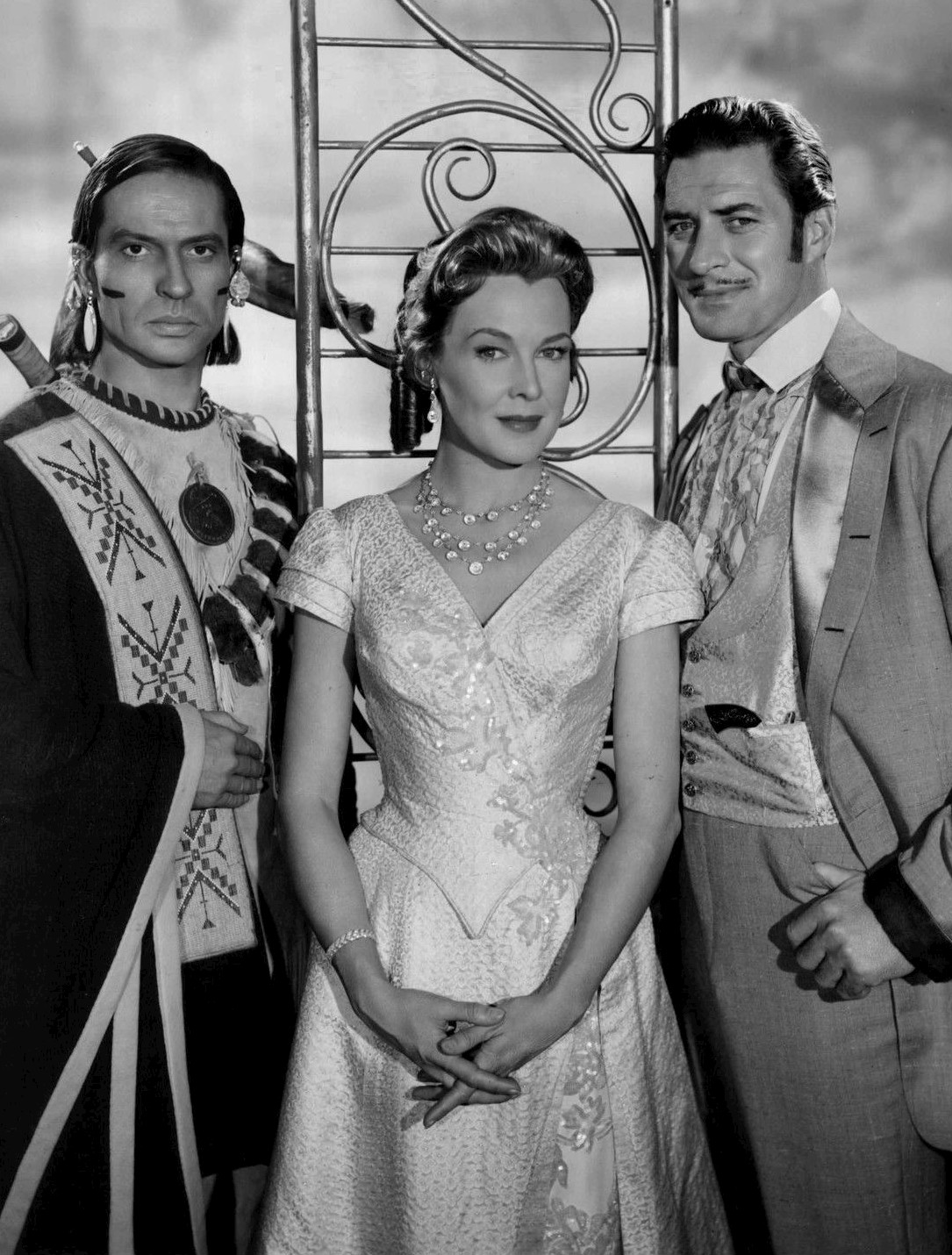
X Brands, Frances Bergen, and Jock Mahoney in Yancy Derringer (1959)

In 1941, Bergen met 18-year-old Frances Westerman, a young fashion model who had graduated from Los Angeles High School the prior year. He spotted her in the audience of his radio program, where she was the guest of one of his staff members. A long-distance courtship, spanning years, ensued. The two were married in Mexico on June 28, 1945.

On May 9, 1946, Frances gave birth to future actress Candice Bergen, whose first performances were on Bergen's radio show. By 1950, the family lived on Beverly Grove Drive in Los Angeles. The couple's second child was film and TV editor Kris Bergen. Frances also acted in several movies, co-starred in the 1958 TV series Yancy Derringer, and guest-starred in many other shows.

== Death ==
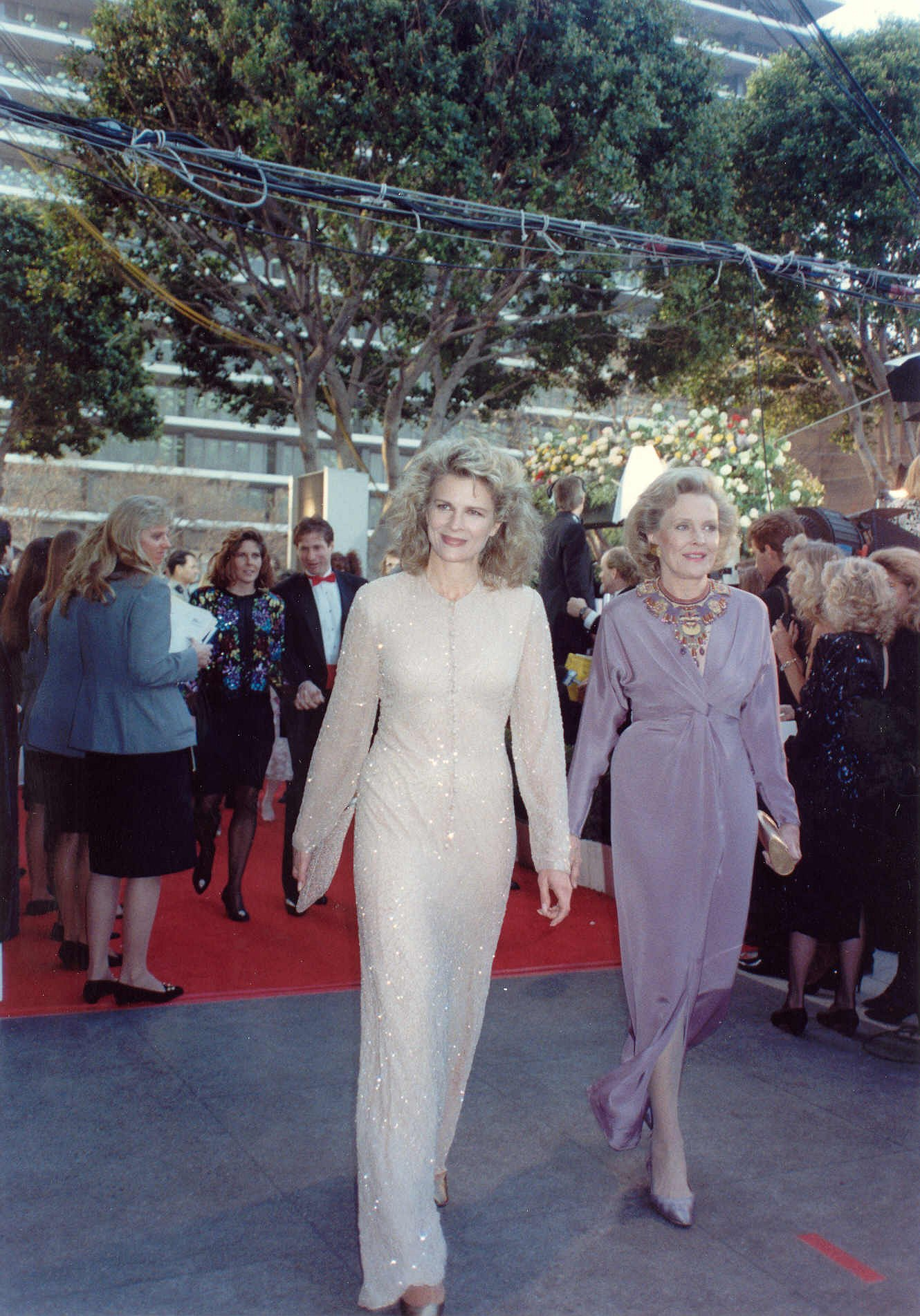
Bergen's daughter Candice Bergen and his wife, actress Frances Bergen, at the 62nd Academy Awards in 1990

In mid-September 1978, Bergen announced his retirement and sent his monocled, top-hatted partner, Charlie McCarthy, to the National Museum of American History at the Smithsonian Institution in Washington, D.C. He opened for Andy Williams at Caesar's Palace Hotel Las Vegas on September 27, for a two-week "Farewell to Show Business" engagement. Three days later, on September 30, 1978, he died of kidney disease. Bergen was interred with his parents (buried under their true surname of "Berggren") in Inglewood Park Cemetery, Inglewood, California.

In his will, Bergen left his daughter nothing but bequeathed his dummy, Charlie McCarthy, $10,000. Candice Bergen said she had wanted her father’s approval all her life, and that his will proved she would never got it.

A message in the closing credits dedicates The Muppet Movie, which featured Bergen and Charlie in their last screen appearance, to the memory and magic of Bergen.

In 1990, Bergen was elected to the Radio Hall of Fame, the same year that The Charlie McCarthy Show was selected as an honored program. In 1991, the United States Postal Service honored him with a 29-cent commemorative stamp.

Bergen's widow, Frances Westerman Bergen, died at Cedars-Sinai Medical Center in Los Angeles, on October 2, 2006, at age 84. She is buried in Forest Lawn Memorial Park (Hollywood Hills).

== Hollywood Walk of Fame ==
Bergen was inducted into the Hollywood Walk of Fame with three stars in 1960, for his contributions to television, motion pictures, and radio. The stars are located at 6425, 6766, and 6801 Hollywood Boulevard, respectively.

== Filmography ==
- 1931: The Eyes Have It as Dr. Wilbur Grant
- 1938: The Goldwyn Follies as himself / Charlie McCarthy
- 1938: Letter of Introduction as himself / Charlie McCarthy / Mortimer Snerd
- 1939: You Can't Cheat an Honest Man as The Great Edgar / Charlie McCarthy / Mortimer Snerd
- 1939: Charlie McCarthy, Detective as himself / Charlie McCarthy / Mortimer Snerd
- 1941: Look Who's Laughing as himself / Charlie McCarthy
- 1942: Here We Go Again as himself / Charlie McCarthy / Mortimer Snerd
- 1943: Stage Door Canteen as himself / Charlie McCarthy / Mortimer Snerd
- 1944: Song of the Open Road as himself / Charlie McCarthy
- 1947: Fun and Fancy Free as himself / Charlie McCarthy / Mortimer Snerd
- 1948: I Remember Mama as Mr. Thorkelson
- 1950: Captain China as Mr. Haasvelt
- 1950: Charlie's Haunt as himself / Charlie McCarthy
- 1953: Mystery Lake as Dr. Sorenson
- 1964: The Hanged Man (TV Movie) as Hotel Clerk
- 1965: One Way Wahine as Sweeney
- 1967: Don't Make Waves as Madame Lavinia
- 1968: Rogue's Gallery as Roy Benz
- 1970: The Phynx as himself / Charlie McCarthy
- 1976: Won Ton Ton, the Dog Who Saved Hollywood as Professor Quicksand
- 1979: The Muppet Movie as himself / Charlie McCarthy (final film role)
- 2009: I'm No Dummy as himself / Charlie McCarthy (archival footage)
