= Eileen Davidson =

American actress, author and television personality

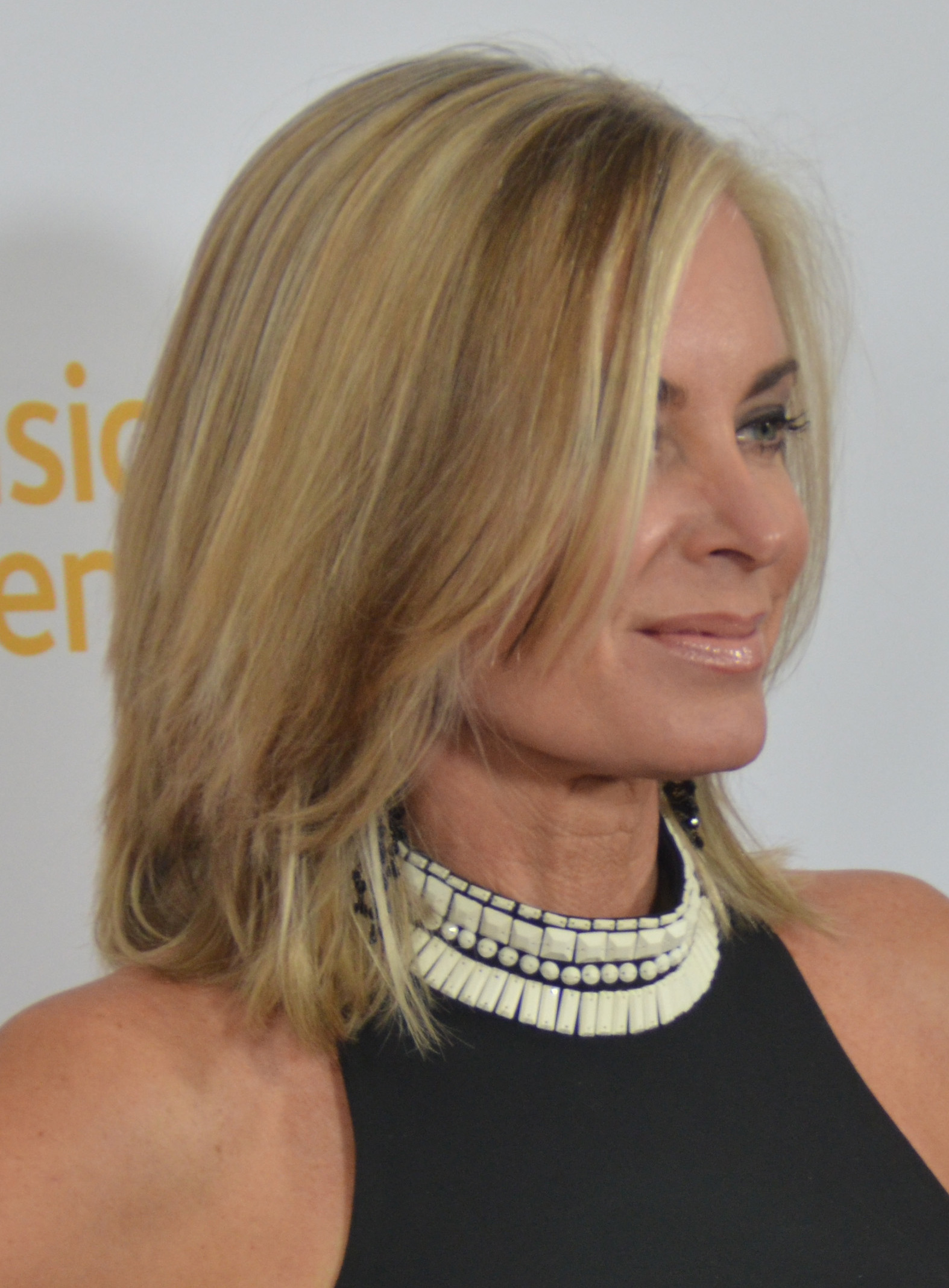
- Davidson in 2014
- Born: Eileen Marie Davidson; June 15, 1959 (age 67); Artesia, California, U.S.
- Occupations: Actress; author; television personality; model
- Years active: 1982–present
- Spouses: Christopher Mayer (m. 1985; div. 1986) Jon Lindstrom (m. 1997; div. 2000) Vincent Van Patten (m. 2003)
- Children: 1

Eileen Marie Davidson (born June 15, 1959) is an American actress and author. Best known for her work in soap operas, Davidson is most notable for her roles as Ashley Abbott on CBS's The Young and the Restless and The Bold and the Beautiful, Kristen DiMera and Susan Banks on NBC's Days of Our Lives and as the final portrayal of Kelly Capwell on Santa Barbara.

Her work has earned her two Daytime Emmy Awards for Outstanding Lead Actress in a Drama Series for her roles in Days of Our Lives (2014) and The Young and the Restless (2018).

Davidson also starred in the slasher film The House on Sorority Row (1983), had a leading role in the short-lived CBS crime series Broken Badges (1990–91), and wrote a number of mystery novels in the 2000s. In 2014, Davidson joined the cast of Bravo's reality television series The Real Housewives of Beverly Hills, appearing full-time on the program until 2017.

== Early life ==
Davidson, the youngest of seven children, was born in Artesia, California, to Charlotte (née Burkhard) Davidson, a homemaker, and Richard Davidson, an airplane parts manufacturer. She was raised Roman Catholic. She attended Corona Del Mar High School in Newport Beach, California and Orange Coast College in Costa Mesa.

== Career ==
Davidson originated the role of Ashley Abbott on The Young and the Restless in March 1982, beating out more than 100 candidates. The character of Ashley became a front-burner character, and Davidson became an integral part of the show. In 1987, Davidson had been offered a role on All My Children playing opposite of Walt Willey's character, but turned it down as she could not afford to move to New York with her five dogs. She quit Y&R in December 1988 and the producers took her recommendation of hiring a look-alike actress named Brenda Epperson, whom Davidson had discovered waiting tables at a charity function. Throughout the 1980s, Davidson starred in two films: The House on Sorority Row (1983), and Easy Wheels (1989), playing opposite Ted Raimi.

Davidson then appeared in primetime television, but her show, Broken Badges (1990–1991), was canceled. She returned to daytime when she assumed the role of Kelly Capwell on Santa Barbara from November 1991 until the soap's cancelation in January 1993. Beginning in May 1993, she captured the role of Kristen Blake on Days of Our Lives. As originally conceived, Kristen was a heroine, who had an Achilles' heel in that the show's supervillain, Stefano, had raised her after the death of her parents. James E. Reilly, who assumed head writing reins in 1993, began to make Kristen more of a villainess. Reilly eventually developed an outrageous second role for Davidson, having her play Susan Banks, a Kristen look-alike. Reilly eventually penned three more roles for Davidson (Sister Mary Moira, Thomas, and Penelope). Her character, Kristen, intended to keep her other character, Susan, prisoner on an island, but Susan ultimately prevailed and Kristen remained on the island until she returned to Salem in 2012. All other related characters were last seen in May 1998. Davidson's five roles earned her a Daytime Emmy nomination for Outstanding Lead Actress in 1998.

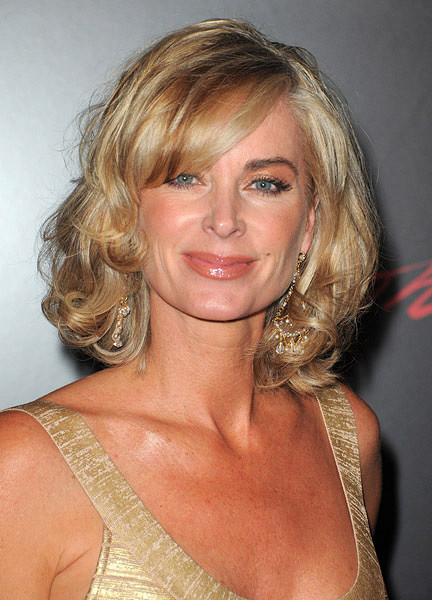
Davidson in 2010

After a year-long vacation from acting, she returned to The Young and the Restless in March 1999 to reprise the role of Ashley Abbott. After a successful return, Davidson's was nominated for the Soap Opera Digest Award for Favorite Return. In November 2006, Davidson was fired from the show. Davidson told TV Guide the following month that she was fired from the show due to a lack of storyline. Her last airdate as Ashley was January 11, 2007. According to co-star Melody Thomas Scott, the firing was protested behind the scenes of The Young and the Restless and was seen as unfair. Scott said: "That was so heartbreaking. We're still upset about that. That was a blow. Terrible. Eileen Davidson was such a part of the core of the show and such a brilliant actress; beautiful and always prepared. It was crazy. I'm not the only one who feels that way."

In February 2007, Davidson signed a three-year contract with The Bold and the Beautiful (The Young and the Restless's sister soap) to once again play her Y&R character Ashley Abbott at the request of B&B executive producer Bradley Bell. Her Bold and the Beautiful debut aired on March 9, 2007. Ken Corday called Davidson about a week before she was fired from The Young and the Restless to get permission to use a picture of her on Days of Our Lives. The picture, which featured Davidson as Susan, was shown in December 2006. After she was fired from The Young and the Restless but before being cast in The Bold and the Beautiful, her niece Devon Martt, a fashion designer, approached her about designing clothes together.

Since 2008, Davidson has written four novels as a part of her Soap Opera Mystery series; following a soap opera actress named Alexis Peterson. The Soap Opera Mystery series includes Death in Daytime (2008), Dial Emmy for Murder (2009), Diva Las Vegas (2010), and Swinging in the Rain (2011).

In July 2008, Davidson was downgraded to recurring status at The Bold and the Beautiful; leading to her full-time return to The Young and the Restless on September 26, 2008, and her definitive exit from The Bold and the Beautiful in November. In May 2012, Davidson announced per her Twitter account that she had been fired from The Young and the Restless. In July, journalist Nelson Branco explained that Sony Pictures Entertainment wanted Davidson on both The Young and the Restless and Days of Our Lives, but that Y&R would not share the actress, resulting in Sony terminating her contract with them. Thus, it was announced that Davidson would reprise her role as Kristen Blake DiMera on Days of Our Lives.

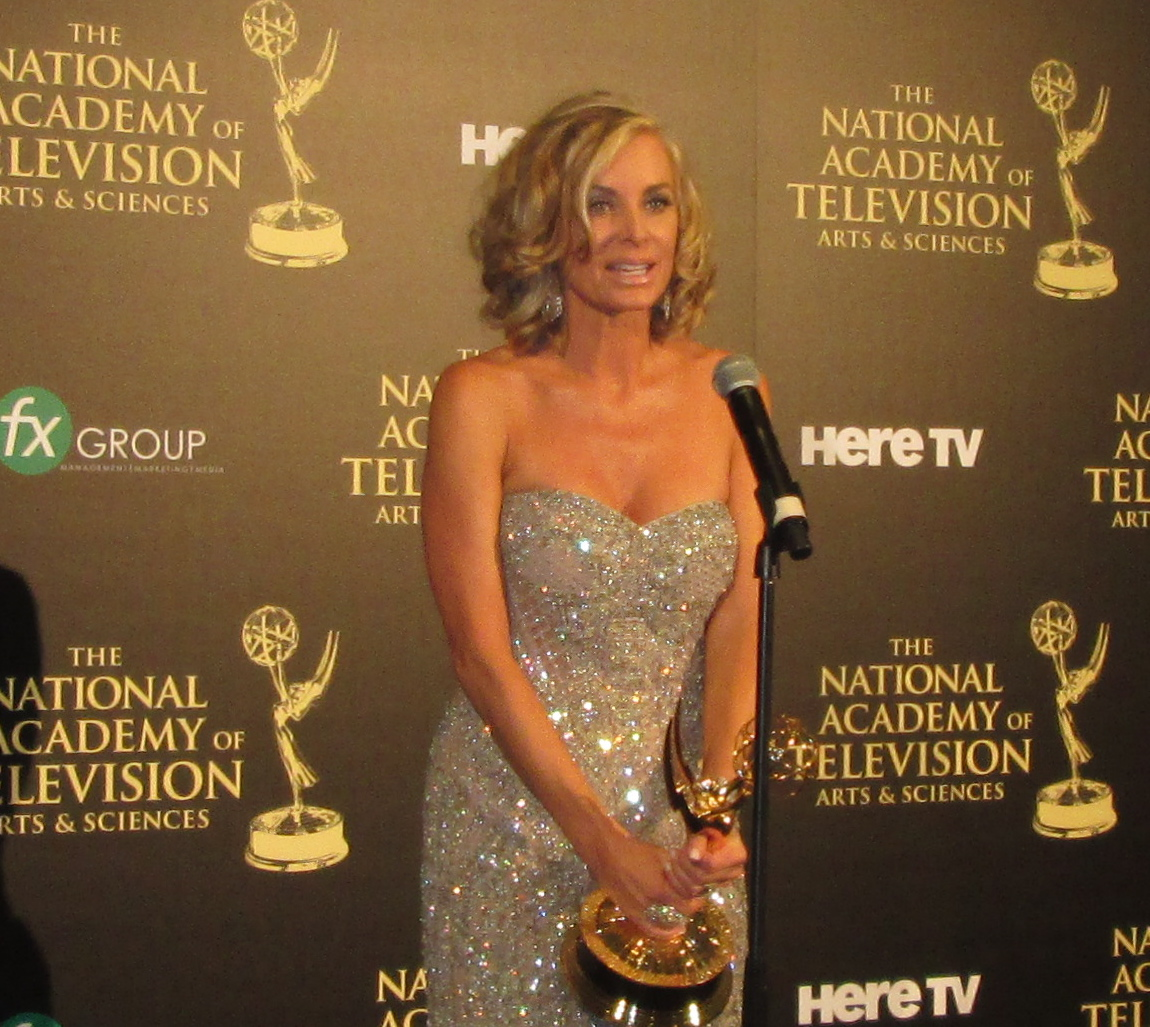
Davidson at the 2014 Daytime Emmy Awards.

Davidson made a brief appearance on The Young and the Restless in February 2013 for the soap's 40th anniversary. In July 2013, Davidson made the decision to leave Days of Our Lives one year after her return. Her intended final on-screen appearance as Kristen aired on November 13, however, Davidson returned for an episode on December 3, 2013. In January 2014, TV Guide reported Davidson would formally return to Days in the summer of 2014. On May 1, 2014, Davidson was revealed as a nominee for the Daytime Emmy Award in the category of Outstanding Lead Actress In A Drama Series for her role as Kristen DiMera. It was her third Daytime Emmy Award nomination, her second for Days; she won her first Daytime Emmy Award at the 41st Daytime Emmy Awards, making her the second actress to win a Daytime Emmy Award in the category of "Lead Actress" for the soap.

On June 17, 2014, Soap Opera Digest confirmed Davidson had signed a contract to return to The Young and the Restless. Subsequently, Davidson revealed that her Y&R contract was for two years and that it included a stipulation that she could continue doing Days of Our Lives (which she had finished filming for two weeks prior) in the future, as well as having the option of taking a break if work became too hectic. The following month, Davidson was confirmed to be joining the cast of the fifth season of the Bravo reality television series, The Real Housewives of Beverly Hills, her first appearance on reality television. On November 17, 2014, it was announced that Davidson was back on-set of Days of Our Lives, with a stint set to air in spring 2015. She appeared from April 15–30, 2015. On June 12, 2017, Davidson was confirmed to be returning to Days of Our Lives in an unknown capacity and role. In July, Davidson announced her departure from The Real Housewives of Beverly Hills after three seasons due to work scheduling. She appeared on Days from November 2–21, portraying the role of Susan, and briefly reprising the roles of Kristen and Sister Mary Moira. In April 2018, Davidson won her second Daytime Emmy Award for Outstanding Lead Actress In A Drama Series for her role as Ashley Abbott; her first award for her work on The Young and the Restless. In late June, Davidson announced she would be departing Y&R in September, after wanting more control of her "day-to-day life."

Davidson reprised the role of Ashley on Y&R from March 28–29, 2019. In September 2019, she starred as KC in the comedy film 7 Days to Vegas directed by Eric Balfour, and co-written by her husband, Vincent Van Patten. The following year, she starred in the Christmas film Middleton Christmas (2020) as Alana D'Angelo, the dean of a prestigious high school. From 2021 to 2022, she starred in the Peacock limited series, Days of Our Lives: Beyond Salem reprising her previous roles of Kristen, Thomas Banks, and Sister Mary Moira Banks. She also starred in the Christmas film Days of Our Lives: A Very Salem Christmas for the streaming service in 2021. Also in 2021, Davidson starred in the thriller film Symphoria written and directed by Catherine Dao. In 2023, she starred in the Netflix romantic Christmas drama film Holiday in the Vineyards.

== Filmography ==
=== Film ===
Year	Title	Role	Notes
1982	Goin' All the Way!	BJ	
1983	The House on Sorority Row	Vicki	
1989	Easy Wheels	She Wolf	
1990	Eternity	Dahlia / Valerie	Film
2000	Weyback	Bell Clark	
2012	Hell and Mr. Fudge	Mrs. Fudge	
2013	Stranger at the Pentagon	Deena Thor	Short film
2017	The Guest House	Dr. Hopkins	
2019	7 Days to Vegas	KC	
2020	Middleton Christmas	Alana D'Angelo	
2021	Days of Our Lives: A Very Salem Christmas	Kristen DiMera	
2021	Symphoria	Vickey Lewis	
2023	Holiday in the Vineyards	Margo Baldwyn	

=== Television ===
Year	Title	Role	Notes
1982	The Phoenix	Ellie	Episode: "The Fire Within"
1982	Tattletales	Herself	5 episodes
1982–1988, 1999–present	The Young and the Restless	Ashley Abbott	Series regular
1990	Broken Badges	J.J. "Bullet" Tingreedes	Main role
1991–1993	Santa Barbara	Kelly Capwell	Series regular
1993–1998, 2012–2015, 2017, 2021, 2023	Days of Our Lives	Kristen DiMera, Marlena Evans, Susan Banks, Sister Mary Moira Banks, Penelope Kent, Thomas Banks	Series regular
2007–2008	The Bold and the Beautiful	Ashley Abbott	Series regular
2009	Dog Whisperer with Cesar Millan	Herself	Episode: "Charlotte, Elvis and Jack"
2014–2018, 2020	The Real Housewives of Beverly Hills	Herself	Series regular (seasons 5–7); Guest (seasons 8 & 10)
2018	The Last Sharknado: It's About Time	Marie Antoinette	Television film
2021–2022	Days of Our Lives: Beyond Salem	Kristen DiMera, Thomas Banks, Sister Mary Moira Banks	Limited series, 6 episodes
2026	The Real Housewives Ultimate Girls Trip	Herself	Guest (season 5); Episode: "Roaring 20th: White Lies"

== Bibliography ==
Davidson collaborated with Robert J. Randisi on the following novels.

List of novels
Date of publication	Title
2008	Death In Daytime
2009	Dial Emmy For Murder
2010	Diva Las Vegas
2011	Swingin' In The Rain

== Awards and nominations ==
Year	Award	Category	Title	Result	Ref.
1986	Soap Opera Digest Award	Outstanding Lead Actress in a Daytime Drama	The Young and the Restless	Nominated	
1988	Soap Opera Digest Award	Outstanding Heroine	The Young and the Restless	Nominated	
1997	Soap Opera Digest Award	Outstanding Lead Actress	Days of Our Lives	Nominated	
1998	Daytime Emmy Award	Outstanding Lead Actress in a Drama Series	Days of Our Lives	Nominated	
1999	Soap Opera Digest Award	Favorite Return	The Young and the Restless	Nominated	
2003	Daytime Emmy Award	Outstanding Lead Actress in a Drama Series	The Young and the Restless	Nominated	
2014	Daytime Emmy Award	Outstanding Lead Actress in a Drama Series	Days of Our Lives	Won	
2018	Daytime Emmy Award	Outstanding Lead Actress in a Drama Series	The Young and The Restless	Won	
2021	Garden State Film Festival	Best Supporting Actress	7 Days to Vegas	Won	
2021	Garden State Film Festival	Best Ensemble	7 Days to Vegas	Won	
2025	Daytime Emmy Award	Outstanding Lead Actress in a Drama Series	The Young and the Restless	Nominated	
