= Senator Coughlin =

Senator Coughlin may refer to:

- Edward J. Coughlin (1885–1945), New York State Senate
- Kevin Coughlin (born 1970), Ohio State Senate
- Lawrence Coughlin (1929–2001), Pennsylvania State Senate
- Robert E. Coulson (1912–1986), Illinois State Senate
