= Celebrity Charades =

- Presented by: Jay Johnson; Chad Lowe
- Announcer: Dick Patterson
- Music by: Score Productions
- Country of origin: United States
- No. of episodes: 45 (1979)

Production
- Running time: 22 minutes
- Production company: Fein-Schwartz Productions

Original release
- Network: Syndicated (daily, 1979); AMC (2005)
- Release: January 1979 – June 24, 2005

Celebrity Charades is a game show that originally aired from January to September 1979 as a syndicated series throughout the United States.

== Original version ==
The original version was hosted by Jay Johnson, along with his dummy Squeaky, and Dick Patterson was the announcer. The series was modeled after Stump The Stars, which itself is a successor of the long-running Pantomime Quiz of the 1950s.

Much like the earlier versions, the show consisted of two teams of four celebrities attempting to act out comedic phrases, each within 75 seconds instead of two minutes like in prior versions. The team who guessed all their phrases in the least amount of time won $500 for their favorite charity. In the event of a tie, teams got only $250 each towards their charity.

The series was produced by Fein-Schwartz Productions, in association with Columbia Pictures Television. Music was provided by Score Productions, and would be recycled for other game shows: a re-arranged version of a commercial cue later became the theme to Mindreaders, hosted by Dick Martin of Rowan & Martin's Laugh-In fame, which in turn, was also the theme for an unsold 1980's pilot called Puzzlers hosted by future Wheel of Fortune star Pat Sajak and was used as the theme called Claim to Fame, produced by Carleton Productions in association with Goodson-Todman Productions, hosted by Mike McManus, it aired exclusively in Canada on CTV from 1981 until 1982. Additionally, a re-arranged version of the main theme with a faster tempo was used during the pricing game Switcheroo on the Tom Kennedy version of The Price Is Right, which was previously used as the theme for an unsold game show pilot called Babble (also hosted by Kennedy) in 1984.

== AMC version ==
The second (and most recent) version aired five episodes from June 20 to 24, 2005 on the AMC television network in the United States. The show stemmed from a private series of parties hosted by actor Chad Lowe and his then-wife, actress Hilary Swank.

=== Gameplay ===
On the show, celebrity teams of five were sent into two separate rooms. In each round of play, a set of five movie titles to be guessed are predetermined by the producers. One person from each team is given the first title; then each must run to a section of the house where his/her teammates are waiting, then pantomime the title. The team member who guesses correctly subsequently runs to the central location where someone is waiting with the second answer to be guessed. This goes on for five answers. When all answers are guessed, the team must come up with the common theme that chains the answers together. The first team to do so wins the round.

There is no prize awarded to the winner. Instead, all participants agreed to donate their appearance fee to a charity of their choice.

== Episode status ==
The first three episodes (all with the same celebrities) were aired by GSN in the fall of 1997, after which the show was pulled off the schedule for unknown reasons, although a random episode from later in the show's run was aired as a GSN Game of the Week in 1999.

The AMC version exists in its entirety.
