= Broken Badges =

- Genre: Police procedural
- Starring: Miguel Ferrer; Eileen Davidson
- Opening theme: Mike Post; Vocalist on opening theme uncredited
- Ending theme: Mike Post
- Composers: Mike Post (1.1, "Westside Stories"); Velton Ray Bunch (1.2, "Argo the Venusian", 1.5, and 1.6 -- the finale)
- Countries of origin: United States; Canada
- Original language: English
- No. of seasons: 1
- No. of episodes: 7

Production
- Running time: 60 minutes
- Production company: Stephen J. Cannell Productions

Original release
- Network: CBS
- Release: November 24, 1990 – June 20, 1991

Broken Badges is an American-Canadian police procedural drama television series that aired on CBS from November 24, 1990, to December 22, 1990, and from June 6, 1991 to June 20, 1991. The series was co-created by Stephen J. Cannell.

== Premise ==
Broken Badges followed three police officers, J.J "Bullet" Tingreedes, who was addicted to danger, Stanley "Whipusall" Jones, a small man who would explode when people would make comments about his size, and Toby Baker, a kleptomaniac. All were on psychiatric leave from the police department. Together, with former New Orleans cop Beau Jack Bowman and police psychiatrist Priscilla Mather, they formed a crime fighting team.

== Cast ==
- Miguel Ferrer as Beau Jack Bowman
- Eileen Davidson as J.J "Bullet" Tingreedes
- Jay Johnson as Stanley "Whipusall" Jones
- Ernie Hudson as Toby Baker
- Charlotte Lewis as Priscilla Mathers

== Episodes ==
No.	Title	Directed by	Written by	Original release date
1 2	"Pilot"	Kim Manners	Stephen J. Cannell & Randall Wallace	November 24, 1990
3	"Westside Stories"	James Whitmore Jr.	Jack Bernstein	December 1, 1990
4	"Strawberry"	Jonathan Sanger	Randall Wallace	December 8, 1990
5	"Chucky"	Kim Manners	Stephen J. Cannell	December 22, 1990
6	"Meet Your Matchmaker"	Tucker Gates	Jack Bernstein	June 6, 1991
7	"Argo the Venusian"	Alan Cooke	Randall Wallace	June 13, 1991
8	"Can I Get a Witness?"	David Nutter	Jack Bernstein	June 20, 1991

== Broadcast ==
This show debuted on CBS on November 24, 1990, replacing E.A.R.T.H. Force, this was done as part of a realignment in CBS' programming lineup that involves other programming. It did not fare well in the ratings, and it was quietly cancelled later that year.

== Home media ==
On July 27, 2010, Mill Creek Entertainment released Prime Time Crime: The Stephen J. Cannell Collection on DVD in Region 1. This collection contained 54 episodes from 13 different shows produced by Stephen J. Cannell Productions, including all seven episodes of Broken Badges.

== Bibliography ==
- Tim Brooks and Earle Marsh, The Complete Directory to Prime Time Network and Cable TV Shows 1946–Present, Ninth edition (New York: Ballantine Books, 2007) ISBN 978-0-345-49773-4
