= Joshua Mallett =

American rapper (born 1981)

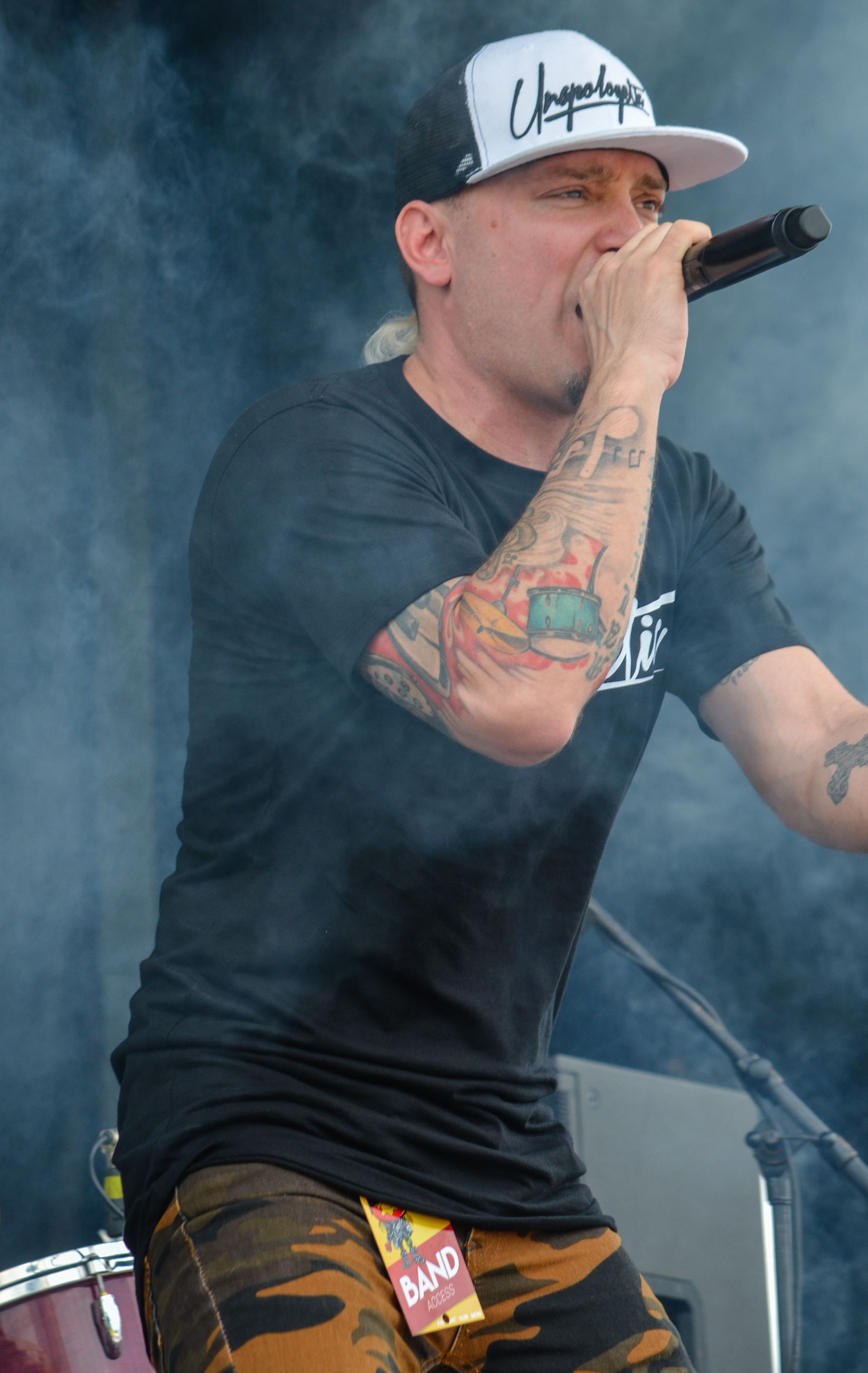

Background information
- Born: December 10, 1981 (age 44); Waukegan, Illinois, U.S.
- Genres: Hip hop
- Occupations: Rapper; disc jockey; record producer; film director; singer; songwriter
- Instruments: Music sequencer; synthesizer; digital audio workstation
- Years active: 2000-present
- Labels: Island Def Jam; RiP Records
- Website: whoisrip.com/

Joshua Mallett (born December 10, 1981), also known by his stage name Rip, is an American rapper and disc jockey from Waukegan, Illinois. Rip has been selected as a "Famous Waukeganite" by the City of Waukegan. In 2018 he was considered for four Grammy Awards and was the first billed hip-hop set to perform the Grand stage at The World's Largest Brat Fest on May 26, 2018.

== Career ==
Rip's career started early when he created "Rip Records", an independent record label while in high school. In 2002, he released "In The Lab 1.0" followed by "Coming Up In The Game" in 2003. At an early age, the Recording Industry Association of America (RIAA) and Atlantic Records awarded him a Platinum Plaque in 2003 for his activities in the music industry. After a decade of musical activities in the Midwest, Rip relocated in Madison, Wisconsin. He released his debut solo album "Fashionably Late" in June 2010. This album was co-produced by DJ Pain 1 with contribution of childhood friend Justin Mentell. Its single "Watchin Me" was aired in radios across the U.S. Rip's "Sellout" album was released in 2012 by Island Def Jam including its single "Kissin In The Dark", a collaborative effort with country singer Augie Zibell. In November 2013, Rip won five Madison Hip-Hop Awards including artist, song, video, and videographer of the year. In the same month, he released on DVD "The Making of a Sellout", a feature film documentary about Rip's life and career. In 2014, Rip released his film "Giddy Up" at the Sundance Cinema in Madison, WI. In 2016, Rip initiated his album "Trinity", a defining moment in his musical career. Trinity focuses on his religious beliefs, struggles, addictions and obstacles he faced his entire life. It is also a tribute to his "Savior" Jesus Christ.

The week of April 8, 2018, Rip's single "Drown" was #1 in rotation on 97x FM-WIXL in Madison, WI.

In May 2019, Rip debuted "Jolene" live at The World's Largest Brat Fest and announced he's working on his fourth studio album, Delivered, which is due out in 2020. He officially released "Jolene" as a single on November 1, 2019.

In August 2019, he headlined his first international show, Urban Fest, in La Ceiba, Honduras.

In May 2023, Joshua "Rip" Mallett released his album, "Delivered".

In summer 2025, Mallett began production on his first feature film, Ultimate 90s Movie (working title), a 90s-era coming-of-age drama set in the Midwest that he wrote, produced, and directed under his imprint RIP ENT.

== Works ==
=== Discography ===
Title	Label	Year
In The Lab 1.0 (album)	Rip Records	2002
Coming Up In The Game (album)	Rip Records	2003
Fashionably Late (album)	Rip Records, Island Def Jam, Digital Distribution	2010
Watchin Me (single)	Rip Records, Island Def Jam, Digital Distribution	2010
Sellout (2012 album)	Rip Records, Island Def Jam, Digital Distribution	2012
Kissin In The Dark (single)	Rip Records, Island Def Jam, Digital Distribution	2012
Trinity (album)	Rip Records	2017
Delivered (album)	Rip Records	2023

=== Filmography ===
Title	Credited as	Year
Let's Go to Prison	Talent	2006
The Making of a Sellout (Documentary)	Director, producer, actor	2013
Giddy Up: A 48 Hour Film Project	Co-director, producer, actor	2014
Ultimate 90s Movie (Working Title)	Writer, Producer, Director	2026
