= Goin' All the Way! =

1981 American film

- Theatrical release poster
- Directed by: Robert Freedman
- Written by: Roger Stone; Jack Cooper
- Produced by: Frank Rubin; Gary Gibbs
- Starring: Dan Waldman; Deborah Van Rhyn; Joshua Cadman; Sherie Miller; Joe Colligan; Sylvia Summers; Eileen Davidson; Rachel Smith; Dan Woren; Jim Sweeny
- Cinematography: Don W. Jones
- Edited by: Robert Freedman; George Copanas
- Music by: Richard Hieronymus
- Production company: Pacificon
- Distributed by: Saturn International Pictures
- Release date: May 7, 1982
- Running time: 85 minutes
- Country: United States
- Language: English
- Box office: $3.5 million

Goin' All the Way! is a 1982 American sex comedy directed by Robert Freeman. It was made in 1982.

== Premise ==
A man wants to lose his virginity.

== Cast ==
- Deborah Van Ryn
- Dan Waldman

== Reception ==
The film made $3.5 million.

One critic called it "abysmal".
