= I'm No Dummy =

- Directed by: Bryan W. Simon
- Written by: Bryan W. Simon
- Produced by: Marjorie Engesser; Montivagus Productions
- Starring: Jeff Dunham; Jay Johnson; Lynn Trefzger; Kelly Asbury; Tom Ladshaw; Jimmy Nelson; Willie Tyler
- Distributed by: Salient Media; NBCUniversal; PopTwist Entertainment (re-release)
- Release dates: May 23, 2009 (Seattle International Film Festival); April 10, 2010 (United States); September 18, 2015 (re-release)
- Running time: 88 minutes
- Country: United States
- Language: English

I'm No Dummy is a 2009 documentary film about ventriloquism directed by Bryan W. Simon and produced by Marjorie Engesser through Montivagus Productions. It premiered at the 2009 Seattle International Film Festival before being released in the United States by Salient Media and NBCUniversal in 2010.

A two-disc limited edition of I'm No Dummy was released on September 18, 2015 by Pop Twist Entertainment and MVD. It was subsequently released in Germany, Great Britain, France and Spain on August 22, 2016.

The comic documentary examines and deconstructs the art form of ventriloquism through clips, photos and interviews with many of the greatest “vents” or ventriloquists and their puppets throughout different eras. The idea came to Simon while on a bike ride in Los Angeles; he was considering alternative ideas for a new project and decided to focus on a documentary about something he loved as a child. The film stars Jeff Dunham, Jay Johnson and Lynn Trefzger, and features Kelly Asbury, Tom Ladshaw, Jimmy Nelson and Willie Tyler. Archival footage of Edgar Bergen, Paul Winchell and Señor Wences is also included.

== Cast ==
- Jeff Dunham
- Jay Johnson
- Lynn Trefzger
- Jimmy Nelson
- Tom Ladshaw
- Kelly Asbury
- Willie Tyler

== Structure ==
The documentary's director, Simon, poses two questions or themes in the film. First, is ventriloquism an art form or some inconsequential variety act? And two, if it is an art form, is it a dying art form?

In order to deconstruct ventriloquism, Simon approached I'm No Dummy like an author might approach a book, dividing the various aspects into “chapters.” Each chapter utilizes interviews, photos and performance clips and examines a specific facet that changed and advanced ventriloquism. There is approximately 45 minutes of performance footage and nearly 100 photos in the film.

Prologue/teaser I'm No Dummy opens with a comical, fast-paced prologue with clips and puppets stating in their own way that they are not "dummies."

What's ventriloquism? This chapter defines ventriloquism from the ventriloquists' and puppets' point of view, such as Jay Johnson who states, "Ventriloquism is the art form of acting and reacting within the same word, much less the same scene.” Lynn Trefzger says, "It's a way of expressing different sides of my personality," and Israeli ventriloquist Allan Blumenstyk states, "Giving a character life aside from yourself. It's not just speaking, it’s what you are speaking. And how you are speaking it and how you are conveying what you want to say through yourself and through your figure." German ventriloquist Stevo Schulling defines ventriloquism as, "Very much a focus through which I can see life and our times." These and many more definitions are illustrated using performance clips.

Why vent? In this chapter, four ventriloquists – Lynn Trefzger, Jeff Dunham, Willie Tyler, and Jay Johnson – discuss and illustrate through performance clips why they are "Vents."

Don't move your lips. This chapter begins, with a clip from The Dyke Van Dyke Show in which Mel Cooley, portrayed by Richard Deacon, performs ventriloquism very badly. Ventriloquists such as Jimmy Nelson, Stevo Schulling, Jeff Dunham, and Jay Johnson explain and prove through performance clips just how important technique is to the art form. Author Dr. David Goldblatt states, “I think that it’s not so much the lips moving, but is the personality exchange going seamlessly? And I think that’s what really makes the best of the ventriloquists. The idea of that seamless exchange, that one can switch those personalities or characters between the ventriloquist and the dummy very quickly.”

There are two of us here! Jeff Dunham states, “If I believe onstage that these guys are carrying on a conversation with me and are actually real, that audience is easily sucked into that reality as well. But then, every once in a while I have to throw in something to break that wall down and go, ‘Look, you people. This is all fake. You realize I am arguing with myself?’” This section dissects the illusion of ventriloquism with performance clips featuring British vent Arthur Worsley, Jeff Dunham, Jimmy Nelson, Lynn Trefzger, and others. As an historian, Tom Ladshaw aptly states, “There is not only the suspension of disbelief, but the suspension of belief there on the puppet’s part.”

What's SOAP got to do with it? Jay Johnson co-starred for four years on the ground-breaking sitcom SOAP. His performance permanently changed the modern audiences view of ventriloquism. He also starred in the one man Tony Award-winning Broadway show Jay Johnson: The Two and Only!, a ventriloquism first.

It's old school? As opposed to an overview of each ventriloquist's life, “It’s old school?” highlights a singular contribution by four historic ventriloquists that elevated ventriloquism. Interviews and performance clips offer a look into their influence.

Paul Winchell As author Kelly Asbury points out, “Paul Winchell really was determined to get the dummy off his knees. He knew if he wanted to set himself apart from what people usually associated with ventriloquists, the little wooden dummy on a ventriloquist’s knee, he had to change something.” As illustrated through numerous clips, Paul Winchell’ s puppets were extremely animated, changing forever the possibilities for puppet manipulation. Clips from Paul various television shows and his appearance on The Ed Sullivan show are used throughout the segment.

Senor Wences Senor Wences forever changed the way people looked at ventriloquism. He often used a combination of ventriloquism, magic and juggling, having appeared on The Ed Sullivan Show a record number of times. Historian Tom Ladshaw stated, “So he had these various talents and he put them together in this bizarre mixture that probably no one else in the world ever would have come up with. And today we describe it as surrealist in nature.”

Jimmy Nelson Author Kelly Asbury notes, “Every ventriloquist today had Jimmy Nelson’s instructional album. So many people working today go back to that,” and Historian Tom Ladshaw emphasizes, “That’s what so many of us in the early sixties learned with, was that album.” Jimmy Nelson, along with his characters Danny O’Day and Farfel, served as the spokespersons for Nestle Quik for over 10 years. Asbury concludes, “Jimmy Nelson really has two legacies. On a broad scale, his legacy is as one of the greatest television pitchmen of all time. He really is part of an era of people who did television commercials, who did them live. His other legacy is also as a very generous guy in teaching young ventriloquists; up-and-coming ventriloquists over the years who were interested in the art form from his instructional records.” The clips include his appearances on the Ed Sullivan Show, Texaco Star Theater, as well as Nestle Quik commercials.

Edgar Bergen Film director Kelly Asbury opens this segment by stating, “Edgar Bergen’s considered the great master in this day and age. Certainly his great accomplishment, and it’s really a testament to how well-rounded and believable his characters were, was because he was able to gain such giant super stardom. Historian Tom Ladshaw continues, “He created in Charlie McCarthy a living, breathing character. Charlie’s not a puppet, even a puppet with a personality. He’s a person. It’s not Edgar Bergen and his dummy, Charlie McCarthy. It’s Edgar Bergen and Charlie McCarthy.” Clips from many of Bergen's films are used to illustrate his influence.

Where do dummies go when they die? “Where do dummies go when they die?” is an overview of the Vent Haven Museum located in Ft. Mitchell, Kentucky. This is the only museum in the world dedicated to the art of ventriloquism.

End of an era? The section titled "End of an era?" raises the question of whether ventriloquism is a dying art. Ventriloquists offer their perspectives on this significant question. Jay Johnson expresses his thoughts, saying, “But I know it’s not a dying art, because art never dies. Art is an expression. And we have to stop expressing to kill an art form.” The section concludes with Jeff Dunham, the most prominent modern ventriloquist, incorporating interviews, fan comments, and concert footage.

Epilogue This section shows what ventriloquists from the past and present are doing today.

== Critical reception ==
The film has received acclaim from both film critics and the general public. Serious Comedy's website remarked, "I'm No Dummy gives voice to the history and art of ventriloquism. This is a fascinating, interesting, fun to watch, and funny documentary." Patrick Hickey of ReviewFix.com praised it, stating, "With all of his segments a complete success, it’s easy to see why I'm no Dummy is a quality piece of cinema. Charming, thoughtful and fun, from start to finish." Edward Yerke-Robins of LAist observed, "I'm No Dummy presents ventriloquism as a complicated, controlled, and nuanced exercise. It isn't interested in throwing the last word on ventriloquism; its only wish is to entertain while it educates, and it does so beautifully."
