= Jack E. Bairstow =

American lawyer and politician (1902-1963)

John Edward Bairstow (February 7, 1902 – October 28, 1963) was an American lawyer and politician.

Born in Waukegan, Illinois, Bairstow received his law degree from University of Illinois College of Law in 1925 and then practiced law in Waukegan. He was the corporate counsel for the City of Waukegan and city attorney for Highland, Illinois. He was a Democrat. He served in the Illinois House of Representatives from 1953 until his death in 1963. He died in Waukegan, Illinois of circulatory problems.
