= Ray Paddock =

American politician and farmer (1877-1953)

Ray Elliott Paddock (October 9, 1877–December 5, 1953) was an American politician and farmer.

== Background ==
Paddock was born in Wauconda, Illinois, the youngest of seven children to William Robert "Robert" Paddock (1827-1904) and Nancy S. (Stickney) Paddock (1834-1911), originally from Barre, Vermont. The Paddock family were early settlers of Wauconda Township. William Robert's mother, Lucy (Backus) Paddock and William's family traveled on the first passenger train into Waukegan, Illinois in 1855. Ray graduated from Valparaiso University and was a farmer. He married Irma Grace Huson (1886-1972) on June 26, 1912, in Libertyville, Illinois. Paddock served as supervisor of the Wauconda Township, Lake County, Illinois from 1915 to 1928. He also served on the Lake County Board of Supervisors and was chairman of the county board. Paddock served in the Illinois Senate from 1929 to 1951 and was a Republican. Paddock died at the Illinois Research Hospital in Chicago, Illinois. Paddock is buried in the Fort Hill Cemetery, in Round Lake, Illinois.
