= Jay Johnson (ventriloquist) =

American actor and ventriloquist

- Born: July 11, 1949 (age 76); Lubbock, Texas, U.S.
- Occupation: Ventriloquist
- Years active: 1977–present
- Spouse: Sandra Ashbury-Johnson (m. 1972)
- Children: 2

Jay Johnson (born July 11, 1949) is an American ventriloquist and actor, best known for playing Chuck (and Bob) Campbell on Soap.

== Early life ==
Johnson was born in Abernathy, Texas, and raised in Richardson, Texas. He attended Richardson High School, where he was president of the theater club.

Johnson’s interest in ventriloquism began at an early age: he discovered his "natural ability" for the craft when he was about 11 years old. He later recalled that during his high-school years he had begun performing publicly and even appeared in local television commercials with one of his early figures, Squeaky, which gave him a modest local following.

== Television ==
Johnson is best known for his role on the sitcom Soap, in which he played ventriloquist Chuck Campbell and his dummy Bob. Chuck treated Bob as though he were real, and, when performing as Bob, displayed a rude and sarcastic personality that would often provoke violence against the dummy.

In addition to his role on Soap, Johnson has also appeared as a celebrity guest on many game shows and hosted two series of his own, So You Think You Got Troubles (1983) and Celebrity Charades (1979).

He performed in an episode of Mrs. Columbo, playing a ventriloquist who finds his dummy is acting independently of his will and kills the man who carved it. Other post-Soap TV credits include appearances on The Love Boat, Gimme a Break!, Simon & Simon, The Facts of Life, Empty Nest (reuniting him with his "father" from Soap, Richard Mulligan), and Dave's World.

He starred in Broken Badges (1990), a Stephen Cannell CBS television production, in which he played Stanley Jones, a depressed police officer who was also a ventriloquist.

In 1999, he reprised his role of Chuck (and Bob) Campbell in the closing credits of an episode of That '70s Show that referenced Soap. Post-2000 appearances include the 2001 TV Movie What's Up, Peter Fuddy?, an appearance on Reno 911!, and the role of Christopher Davis—biological father of "The Miniature Killer" Natalie Davis—in the CSI: episode "Living Doll".

== Live theater ==
Jay Johnson: The Two & Only! written and performed by Jay Johnson, opened on Broadway to rave reviews at the Helen Hayes Theatre on September 28, 2006. This was preceded by an acclaimed off-Broadway run at the Atlantic Theatre Company in New York. The show also performed at the Zero Arrow Theatre, Cambridge, Massachusetts, and the Brentwood and Colony Theater Company in Los Angeles, California. The Cambridge performance garnered the New England Critics Award, and in Los Angeles, Johnson received the 2006 Ovation Award for Best Solo Performance.

The show deconstructs and demonstrates Johnson's lifelong obsession with the art of ventriloquism. The show is a Valentine, not only to the art, but also to his mentor and friend Arthur Sieving, who created Johnson's first professional puppet. The show is aided and abetted by a cast of ventriloquated characters, including his Soap alter ego, Bob. Johnson won the 2007 Tony Award for Best Special Theatrical Event for the show. He is the only ventriloquist to ever be nominated and win an American Theatre Wing Tony Award or an Ovation Award.

The show was filmed on September 15, 2012, in Thalian Hall in Wilmington, North Carolina. Johnson enlisted film and stage director Bryan W. Simon to direct the film adaptation of the performance. Johnson first met Simon in 2009 when he starred in the comedy documentary I'm No Dummy, directed by Bryan W. Simon.

The original Bob puppet featured on Soap was added to the entertainment collection at the Smithsonian Institution's National Museum of American History in May 2007. He currently uses a replica Bob for Jay Johnson: The Two & Only! and other appearances.
