= Robert E. Coulson =

American politician and lawyer (1912-1986)

Member of the Illinois Senate
- In office 1963–1973

Member of the Illinois House of Representatives
- In office 1957–1962

Mayor of Waukegan, Illinois
- In office 1949–1957

Personal details
- Born: May 12, 1912 Grayslake, Illinois, U.S.
- Died: January 11, 1986 (aged 73) Waukegan, Illinois, U.S.
- Party: Republican
- Education: Dartmouth College; University of Chicago (JD)
- Occupation: Politician, attorney

Military service
- Allegiance: United States
- Branch/service: United States Army
- Rank: Major
- Battles/wars: World War II

Robert E. Coulson (May 12, 1912 – January 11, 1986) was an American politician and lawyer.

== Background ==
Coulson was born on a farm in Grayslake, Illinois. He received his bachelor's degree in 1933 from Dartmouth College and his J.D. degree from University of Chicago Law School. Coulson served in the United States Army during World War II and was commissioned a captain. He spent 10 months in China in charge of the X-2 Counter Espionage Branch for the Office of Strategic Services, leaving the army with the rank of major.

He lived in Waukegan, Illinois with his wife and family. Coulson practiced law in Waukegan. Coulson was assistant state's attorney for Lake County and was in charge of juvenile matters for the county.

He served as mayor of Waukegan from 1949 to 1957. Coulson served in the Illinois House of Representatives from 1957 to 1962. Coulson was a Republican. He then served in the Illinois Senate from 1963 until 1973. Coulson also was a writer.

He died at Victory Memorial Hospital in Waukegan, Illinois.
