= Bryan W. Simon =

American stage and film director and writer

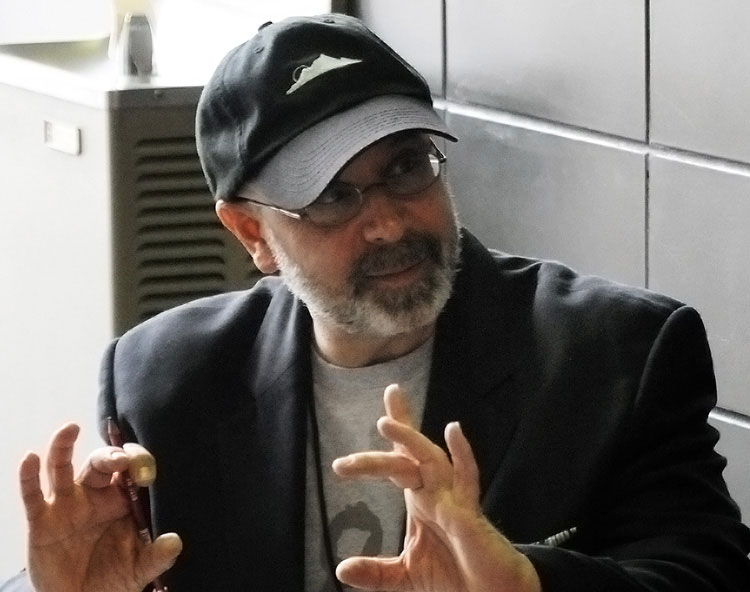
- Born: Champaign, Illinois, U.S.
- Occupations: Film and stage director, writer

Bryan W. Simon is a stage, film director and writer from Waukegan, Illinois. He directed his first professional stage play at 17, the regional tour of a children's show entitled Jack and The Wishing Beans, for the Roundtree Players.

== Early life ==
Simon grew up in Waukegan, Illinois and attended Waukegan High School, the College of Lake County, and went on to attend the University of Wisconsin–Milwaukee, where he graduated with a B.A. in political science. His father, Shadie Simon, was a high school English teacher, writer, educational film producer, and scriptwriter for Coronet Films in Chicago. His mother, Denise Pautz Simon, was a former schoolteacher and homemaker. At a young age, Simon became interested in photography and film, buying a Super 8 camera and making short films.

== Career ==
=== Stage ===
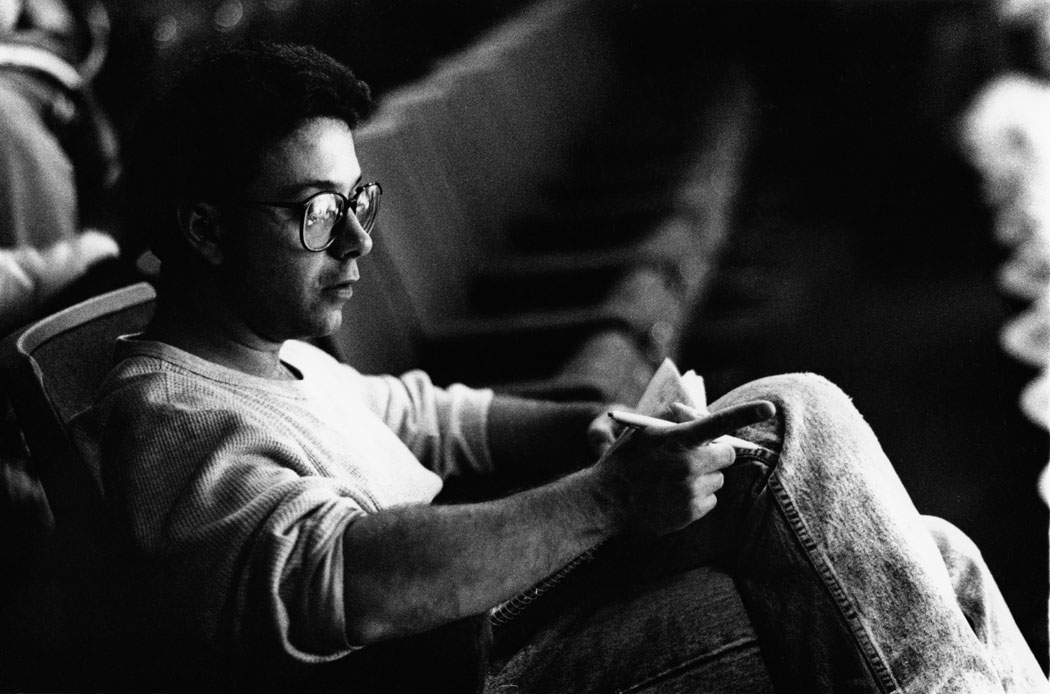
Bryan W. Simon directs a world premiere production at Stage Two in 1992.

Simon directed his first professional stage play at 17, the regional tour of a children's show entitled Jack and The Wishing Beans, for the Roundtree Players. At 29, Simon founded the Chicago area Stage Two Theatre Company in 1985. Stage Two under the artistic direction of Simon held a quiet national status recognized on both coasts for taking risks, having staged 36 global and Midwest premieres. The troupe specialized in debuting works of new playwrights. Simon's goal for Stage Two was to stimulate thought and arouse the imagination.

=== Films ===
The Second Room, Simon's first film, is about an alienated architect, who is paralyzed by disengagement and fear of experience. The Second Room received the Gold Award at the Charleston International Film Festival and was one of five shorts accepted for the AFI-Los Angeles International Film Festival in 1995. The Second Room was selected for the Discovery Series at the Santa Barbara International Film Festival.

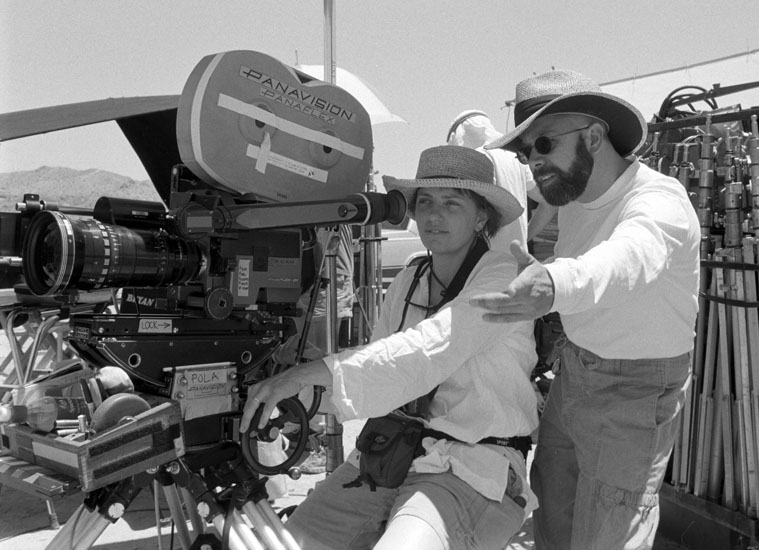
Bryan W. Simon directs Director of Photography Denise Brassard on the set of Along for the Ride.

Simon's next feature film was Along for the Ride, a film about two estranged brothers who meet in Mexico to lay their deceased father to rest. Each man's story, their lies, fears, and deceits weaves a humorous, hallucinatory and heartbreaking journey toward understanding. It won Best of Fest - First Feature at the Saguaro Film Festival International. It was an official selection in competition at the Austin Film Festival, Sarasota Film Festival, New Haven Film Festival and Atlanta Film Festival. The film was originally distributed by Fabrication Films formerly Search Party Films (distribution rights purchased at Sun dance Film Festival). It is now distributed by Pop Twist Entertainment after a complete digital restoration of picture and sound from the original 35 mm negative.

2010 marked the release of I'm No Dummy, the first feature length theatrical documentary about ventriloquism which examined and dissected the world of ventriloquism through clips, photos, and interviews with many of the greatest events from today and yesterday, illustrating that this perceived novelty act is truly an extraordinary art form. I'm No Dummy was re-released in a Special Edition two-disc set and for streaming on September 18, 2015. The Special Edition was subsequently released on August 22, 2016, in the UK, Germany, Spain, France, and Israel.

The picture stars popular ventriloquists such as Comedy Central's two-time Comedian of the Year and YouTube sensation Jeff Dunham, Tony Award winner Jay Johnson of sitcom SOAP fame, and Campus Entertainer of the Year Lynn Trefzger. The film had its world premiere at The Seattle International Film Festival and played at The New York International Children's Film Festival before being released by Salient Media and Vivendi/NBC Universal.

In 2012, Simon directed the big screen adaptation of Jay Johnson's Tony® Award-winning Broadway play, Jay Johnson: The Two and Only!. It was shot in Wilmington, North Carolina at the historic Thalian Hall. The film was released on Pay-Per-View in over 55 million households. In December 2014, it was released worldwide on DVD. The film became part of the Broadway HD library and began streaming worldwide in 2015.

=== Writing and Teaching ===
Simon has been a frequent contributor to magazines and websites on filmmaking such as No Film School, MovieMaker Magazine and The Wrap. His first book was published in 2021, a follow-up to his I'm No Dummy documentary, the book is called I'm No Dummy Everyday: 365 Days of Ventriloquial Oddities, Curiosities, and Fun Facts.

== Reception ==
=== The Second Room ===
Rick Moser of the Copley News Service stated, "An exciting directorial debut. Simon has successfully translated his keen artistic vision to the screen." and "For a film debut, The Second Room shows a strong directorial hand."

Film Threat Magazine in its "Best Of" issue gave The Second Room an 8 out of 10, and said "The Second Room is a hot feature from a director to be on the look out for."

=== Along for the Ride ===
Bill Gallo of the Los Angeles New Times proclaimed, "This first feature by a young Chicago director named Bryan W. Simon is an astonishing thing to behold", and said the film was a "brave, funny, and engaging movie."

Russell Smith of The Austin Chronicle called Along for the Ride, "Fresh and compelling, look and feel is nothing short of amazing" and stated, "Thanks to Simon's assured and straightforward direction, this film rises well above the lackluster status quo of current indie cinema."

Daria Snadowsky of INsite Magazine declared, "Along for the Ride is a triumph for independent cinema... an extraordinary antidote to the mediocre mainstream".

=== I'm No Dummy ===
Patrick Hickey of The Review Fix stated, "Simon has without a doubt done his homework and made his subjects charming, thoughtful and fun, from start to finish."

Dan Pearson, Sun Times Media for the Beacon-News said, "I'm No Dummy, an entertaining and often eloquent 2009 documentary by Waukegan filmmaker Bryan W. Simon."

Edward Yerke-Robins of LAist commented that, "I'm No Dummy presents ventriloquism as a complicated, controlled, and nuanced exercise. I'm No Dummy isn't interested in throwing the last word on ventriloquism; its only wish is to entertain while it educates, and it does so beautifully."

=== Jay Johnson: The Two & Only! ===
Patrick Hickey of The Review Fix stated, "Bryan W. Simon's directing also brings out Johnson's quirky and sincere style with shots that showcase his wide smile. At others, the shot selection adds some extra uniqueness. At one point in the show, Simon takes us the inside of one of Johnson's doll's cases. A rarely seen shot, it caps off an incredibly dramatic segment. Always in the right place at the right time, Simon's work on this production is both well-executed and well-edited."
