= Jimmy Nelson (ventriloquist) =

American ventriloquist (1928–2019)

- Born: James Edward Nelson; December 15, 1928; Chicago, Illinois, US
- Died: September 24, 2019 (aged 90); Cape Coral, Florida, U.S.
- Occupation: Ventriloquist
- Years active: 1945–2019
- Spouses: Margot Humphries (m. 1947; div. 1951); Betty Norman (m. 1956)
- Children: 6

James Edward Nelson (December 15, 1928 – September 24, 2019) was an American ventriloquist who appeared on television in the 1950s and 1960s. He is most famous for commercials for Nestlé chocolate featuring Farfel the Dog. He also hosted a children's show sponsored by Nestlé.

== Early life ==
Nelson was born in Chicago, Illinois, on December 15, 1928. When he was ten years old, his aunt won a toy ventriloquist's dummy named "Dummy Dan" in a Bingo game and gave it to her nephew for Christmas. He learned ventriloquism, and a year later, his father upgraded the dummy's mouth control from a simple string-and-loop to a lever-system like those used in professional ventriloquist's dummies.

Nelson began taking "Dan" to school, where his fourth-grade teacher allowed him to use the dummy when speaking in front of the class. In this way, Nelson taught himself to overcome his fear of public speaking. He soon started using jokes in his presentation, discovering he could make his classmates laugh.

He then started performing for church groups, schools and American Legion posts. By the time he was a teenager, he started earning money competing in amateur talent contests held at the local movie theatres, where the prize was five dollars for the most popular act.

== Professional career ==
In 1945, Nelson asked famed Chicago ventriloquist figure maker Frank Marshall to make him a professional-quality dummy. Marshall, who had made Paul Winchell's Jerry Mahoney, would do this only after seeing the ventriloquist's work. He came to one of Nelson's theatre performances and was impressed, so sold Nelson a custom-made dummy, which he always carved to bear a resemblance to the ventriloquist.

Nelson gave Dummy Dan's replacement the full name Danny O'Day, which he chose because it contained none of the consonants impossible for ventriloquists to say without moving the lips, unlike "McCarthy" and "Mahoney". He then hired a manager and started touring professionally.

By 1947, Nelson was a professional success and Danny O'Day began to show signs of wear, so Nelson hired Marshall to build him a second one. However, Marshall's hand-carved originals (which he tailored to the personality of the ventriloquist) were impossible to duplicate identically, and Nelson felt the second dummy didn't look sufficiently like Danny to replace him. So he decided to maintain Danny, and added heavy eyebrows, eyeglasses and a beret to the new dummy, creating a foil for Danny named Humphrey Higsbye.

In September 1950, Nelson made his first appearance with Danny on The Ed Sullivan Show.

In the late 1950s, Jimmy Nelson released two LP records, one being "Pinocchio", which involved his four major dummies, released on Cricket Records in 1959, and the other being "Jokes and Riddles", which was done before a live audience of children, released on Rocking Horse Records.

=== Farfel the dog ===
One night that year, while working a late show in a Wichita, Kansas, nightclub, he picked up a stuffed dog a patron had left on the piano, and improvised a low-pitched voice to make it talk. This gave him the idea for a new character which he had Marshall build. He named it Farfel, after the Jewish pasta dish he had seen on the menu of the Borscht Belt resorts in upstate New York where he performed. His famous line was: "No, I wouldn't say that."

=== Television career ===
In 1950, Nelson was hired as a regular on the Texaco Star Theatre TV show, hosted by Milton Berle. Nelson and Danny O'Day would appear in Texaco gas jockey uniforms. Nelson was host of several TV shows in the early 1950s, including Bank on the Stars on NBC and Come Closer (originally titled Take My Word) on ABC.

In 1958, he added another animal dummy to his character repertoire, a cat named Ftatateeta, after a character in George Bernard Shaw's play Caesar and Cleopatra. The cat's voice was based on Ed Wynn's. In 1954, Nelson served as emcee on the game shows Bank on the Stars and Come Closer.

In 1960–61, he hosted a 30-minute local TV show in New York titled Studio 99-1/2 on WNTA-TV, channel 13. Ostensibly aimed at children, Studio 99-1/2 featured satirical sketches with new puppets, all voiced by Nelson, who supposedly were part of the TV station of the show-within-the-show. The show generated the release of two children's LP's on Cricket Records, "Pinocchio" and "Peter and the Wolf."

=== Nestlé commercials ===
In 1955, the Nestlé company hired Nelson to do commercials selling their chocolate candy and Nestlé's Quik chocolate milk flavoring. The Nestlé executives had him audition by spontaneously performing their newly written jingle. Nelson sang the first two (musical) lines in Danny's voice:

N-E-S-T-L-E-S,
Nestlé's makes the very best...

He finished with Farfel slowly singing the last word, "chocolate," in two syllables. Nelson was so nervous that his hands sweated, and when Farfel was finished, his finger slipped off the control, causing the mouth to audibly snap shut, a mistake no ventriloquist should make. Nelson left the audition thinking he had blown it, but was surprised to learn he was hired; in fact, the executives actually liked the mouth-snapping effect and asked that he keep it. This became his trademark as the commercials ran for ten years.

When advertising Nestlé's Quik, Danny O'Day would say it "makes milk taste...like a million" (dollars), again slowly and pausing for effect.

During the 1992 Christmas season, Farfel returned to television, now a hand puppet and accompanied by his large, identical-looking family, to advertise Nestle's then-new holiday candy wrapping. Just like the original Farfel, he ended the commercial by snapping his jaw shut after singing "chocolate," now joined by his family.

=== Film career ===
In 2009, Nelson was featured in the ventriloquist comedy documentary I'm No Dummy, directed by Bryan W. Simon.

== Later years ==
Nelson and his wife Betty were residents of Cape Coral, Florida, since the 1960s. He appeared with Danny and Farfel at local schools and retirement homes and was a longtime spokesperson for First Federal Savings and Loan of Fort Myers, where he later became an executive for marketing and public relations.

Nelson was dubbed "The Dean of American Ventriloquists" in 2011.

Nelson collaborated in 2011 with maker of professional ventriloquist figures Tim Selberg to produce a character that pays homage to his Danny O’Day.

He died on September 24, 2019, at the age of 90, from complications of a stroke suffered earlier in the year.

== Family ==
Nelson and his first wife, Margot, had three children: twins Larry and Leejay, and a third son, Jerry. They lived for many years in Forest Hills, New York, and later in Jamaica, New York. Nelson married wife Betty in 1956, and together they had three children: Marianne, Elizabeth, and James. Nelson moved his family to Cape Coral, Florida, in 1968 and he resided there until his death in 2019 at age 90.
