= Tim Selberg =

American sculptor

Timothy Selberg (born in Waterford, Michigan) is a sculptor of three-dimensional carved mechanized figures, most of which are specifically used in the performance of ventriloquism. Selberg and his team at Selberg Studios, Inc. create handcrafted and custom carved works of art for collectors and entertainers.

Selberg has been featured in print media such as Smithsonian, History Magazine, Wall Street Journal and books on the topic of ventriloquism, to include I Can See Your Lips Moving: The History and Art of Ventriloquism. He has also been interviewed for news broadcasts and documentaries, to include the documentary Belly Talkers, and his work has appeared in the films Best in Show and Dead Silence. His figures can also be found in museums and private collections around the globe.

Influenced by American entertainers such as Edgar Bergen, Jimmy Nelson, and Paul Winchell, Selberg is a self-taught mechanical figure maker with a background in commercial art and design.

== Early life ==
Selberg was born in Pontiac, Michigan on November 6, 1959. Tim is a third generation Swedish-American. His grandparents emigrated to the United States from Sweden in the early part of the 20th century. As a young child, Selberg was fascinated with the art of ventriloquism. Watching Jimmy Nelson's Nestle commercials on television piqued his interest in the art form. His mother bought him the Jimmy Nelson record: "Instant Ventriloquism" and a plastic "Danny O’Day" puppet from a Sears, Roebuck & Company catalogue when Tim was six years old. Other sources of early influences for Selberg's creativity inspiration were cartoon animations, animatronics, robotics, and magic and Vaudeville acts.

== Career beginnings ==
By the time he was twelve years old, Selberg was making mechanical puppets and performing at local schools, malls and churches. He reports that he carved his first basswood figure at the age of sixteen with only an X-acto knife. As time went on, he became so engrossed with creating figures that he gave up performing with them. Selberg was selected to attend an exclusive application program in high school referred to as NOVEC (North Oakland County Vocational Education Center) which offered a commercial studies art program to students who exhibited aptitude. Subsequently, he studied overseas in the United Kingdom at Capernwray, a cathedral school where he enrolled in arts and music. Selberg later attended the Center for Creative Studies, a commercial and fine arts college within Wayne State University in Detroit, Michigan, as well as Cranbrook Academy in Bloomfield Hills, Michigan. His figure-making skills were, however, acquired through many years of self study and development.

=== Inspiration ===
Paul Winchell's "Jerry Mahoney", Jimmy Nelson's Nestlé television commercials highlighting his "Farfal the Dog” figure, and Edgar Bergen's "Charlie McCarthy" had a significant impact on Selberg, and he states that without these influences he would have followed a distinctly different career path. Selberg reports that "paying homage to these iconic entertainers is crucial" to trace his career beginnings.

=== Selberg Studios Opens ===
In 1986 Selberg left his day job as a designer at Brasscraft Corporation to create figures full-time for Selberg Studios.

=== Present Day: Worldwide Clientele ===
Selberg's current clientele includes ventriloquist and stand-up comedian Jeff Dunham, the illusionist David Copperfield, ventriloquist, impressionist, comedian and singer Terry Fator, the Disney Corporation, as well as private collectors and galleries. The majority of Selberg's clients are from North America. His diverse clients include a Native American chief from the western U.S. who uses a custom figure in cultural ceremonies, a Native American professor from western Canada whose Selberg figure is a tool to educate students regarding cultural heritage, and an African-American minister who uses a Selberg figure to entertain and admonish his congregation from the pulpit. His international clientele includes customers from Sweden, Argentina, Brazil, Panama, Chile, Australia, China, Japan, South Korea, Philippines, Netherlands, France, Italy, United Kingdom, Turkey, the Middle East. Egypt and South Africa.

== Work ==
In addition to his standard puppets, Selberg has created characters by special request. The figure "George" has unique features and is sometimes referred to as the splattered-brain puppet. The figure required nearly a year of intricate carving and mechanics installations. Most puppets’ heads are covered with fixed synthetic hair that doesn't allow for brain exposure, but "George" has hair that flips up to reveal the damage inflicted on the brain as a result of a simulated gunshot wound. A similar figure also resides in the private collection of entertainer David Copperfield. The "Nude Puppet" figure is an anatomically correct blonde bombshell although she is often clothed while on stage. This figure is used by a French-Canadian performer for corporate events and entertainment purposes. The "Talking Bar Stool" is a unique creation consisting of an intricately carved bar-height chair that comes to life via hidden foot controls used by the practitioner to reveal movable eyes and mouth. A pair of taxidermist's renditions of ventriloquist puppet lion statues were created for a children's theme park in Florida. The Carol Anderson by Invitation (CAbi) clothiers hired Selberg to create lookalike puppets of four key employees. This project, completed 2010, utilized imaging technology in the design. A life-size likeness of Frank Sinatra was created for entertainer Gary Millner. The "Officer von Pork" puppet, that adopts a Jack Nicholson persona, was created for the CBS series Broken Badges and was used by the actor and ventriloquist Jay Johnson. More recently, Selberg was contacted by Sony Pictures to offer consultation services on the "Slappy" puppet; he and his team configured intricate facial features and mechanisms in the "Slappy" character, seen in the 2015 film Goosebumps, based on novels by R.L. Stine.

It was reported in June 2017 that Selberg was working with British film director Mark Noyce on the horror film Sammy.

=== Custom Wood Figures (circa 1985) ===
Disappointed with the lack of overall quality in contemporary ventriloquist figures, Selberg experimented with various techniques and mechanisms that could produce a better figure for performance. As a young adolescent, he carved his first figure using a simple X-acto carving knife. Today, Selberg's first handmade figure, known as the "Selberg Boy", resides in the Vent Haven Museum, in the greater Cincinnati, Ohio area. In February 2007 "Selberg Boy" was the figure of the month at the Vent Haven Museum.
