= Frank Marshall (puppeteer) =

American puppet maker

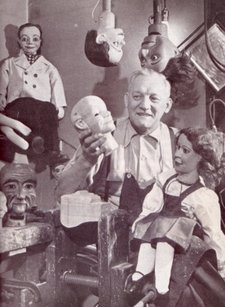
- Born: Frank Marzalkiewicz; 9 March 1900; Chicago, Illinois
- Died: October 10, 1969 (aged 69) Toronto, Canada
- Occupation: Puppet designer
- Years active: 1927–1969
- Era: Vaudeville era

Frank Marshall (born Frank Marzalkiewicz on March 9, 1900; died October 10, 1969) was a professional ventriloquist dummy, marionette and Punch and Judy maker who created many of the most famous ventriloquist dummies used during the United States's vaudeville entertainment era through the Golden Age of Television. He is colloquially known as America's Geppetto. Among his creations were Jerry Mahoney and Knucklehead Smiff for ventriloquist Paul Winchell (both known in Marshall's catalogue as "noseys" or "nosey style", a smart-aleck type character) and Danny O'Day and Farfel the Dog for ventriloquist Jimmy Nelson.

Some members of the ventriloquial community maintain that Marshall carved Charlie McCarthy for the famous ventriloquist Edgar Bergen while working in Theodore Mack & Sons wood shop, though that is a matter of dispute. However, Marshall's own catalog from 1931 indicated that Bergen did use a Marshall figure.

== Life and career ==
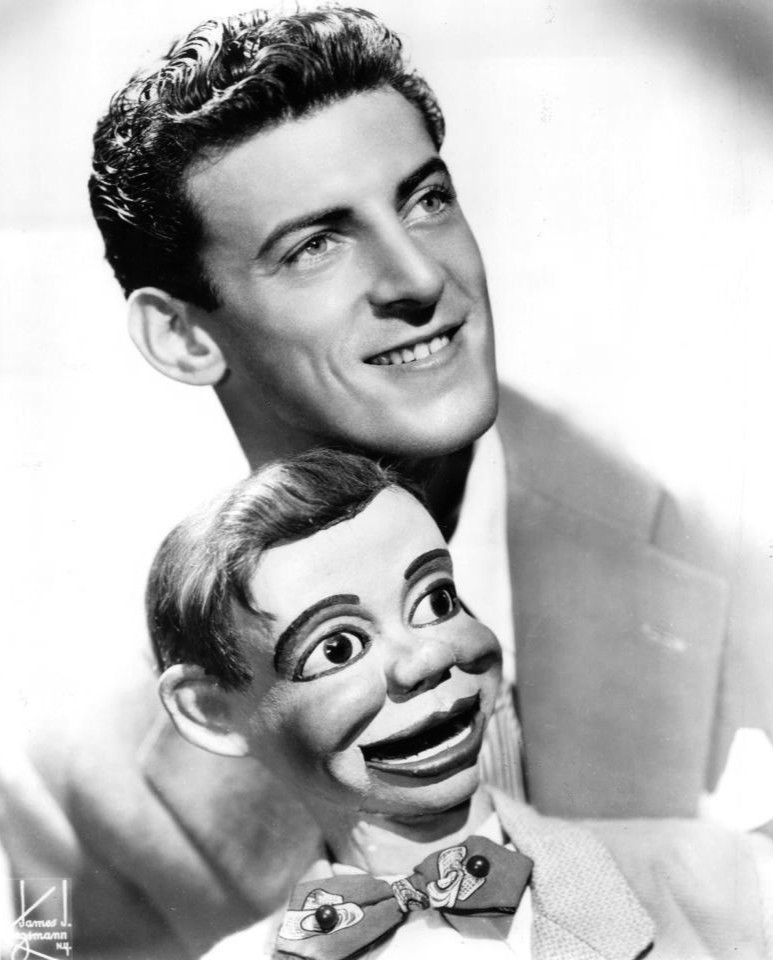
Ventriloquist Paul Winchell with Jerry Mahoney, a classic Marshall "Nosey" figure

Marshall was born in Chicago. As a result of immobility as a child suffering from polio, Marshall became interested in puppetry and wood carvings which did not require strenuous activity.

At age 14, Marshall was hired by a local furniture factory, Theodore Mack and Son, which also produced and sold wooden puppets and dummies. In 1927, Marshall purchased the shop. He ran the shop (in different locations) until his death in 1969. On July 22, 1956, Marshall appeared on the television show What's My Line in which Paul Winchell (along with his dummy Jerry Mahoney) was a member of the panel of judges tasked with identifying the guest.

== Present day ==
Today, Marshall's figures are highly collectable and can sell for tens of thousands of dollars. Classic Marshall figures can be identified by their large eyes (often wall eyed) with small glass pupils, large mouth painted bright red and unique paint tones, including a shade of orange which appeared as human skin tone on black and white televisions screens and on stage when lit by a bright light (commonly known as "Marshall Orange").

Two dummies carved by Marshall (Paul Winchell's Jerry Mahoney and Knucklehead Smiff) are currently held at the Smithsonian's National Museum of American History.
