= Circus Time =

American TV variety series (1956–1957)

Circus Time is a variety program presented in the United States by television network ABC on Thursday evenings from October 4, 1956, to June 27, 1957.

Circus Time was not an actual circus broadcast but rather a circus-themed program, in which both traditional circus acts and more traditional mainstream forms of entertainment were presented. The host, or "ringmaster" in the show's parlance, was ventriloquist Paul Winchell, who was "assisted" by his dummies Jerry Mahoney and Knucklehead Smiff. Mainstream musical guests appearing on the program at times included; The Diamonds, Mickey and Sylvia, the Dell Vikings and Charlie Gracie.

Martin Stone Associates produced the program. Hartz Mountain Products and Bauer & Black were sponsors.

== Bibliography ==
- Tim Brooks and Earle Marsh, The Complete Directory to Prime Time Network and Cable TV Shows 1946–Present, Ninth edition (New York: Ballantine Books, 2007) ISBN 978-0-345-49773-4
