= Bank on the Stars =

1953 American TV game show

- Genre: Game show
- Presented by: Jack Paar; Bill Cullen; Jimmy Nelson
- Narrated by: Olin Tice; Bill McCord
- Country of origin: United States
- Original language: English
- No. of seasons: 2
- No. of episodes: 23

Production
- Camera setup: Multi-camera
- Running time: 24–25 minutes

Original release
- Network: CBS (1953); NBC (1954)
- Release: June 20, 1953 – August 21, 1954

Bank on the Stars is an American game show that aired on CBS and NBC from 1953 to 1954. The series was hosted by Jack Paar, Bill Cullen, and Jimmy Nelson. Roger Price, Olin Tice and Bill McCord were the announcers.

== Broadcast history ==
=== CBS (1953) ===
Bank on the Stars premiered on June 20, 1953. The Saturday night game show was hosted by Jack Paar. The debut episode aired at 9:00 PM ET; subsequent airings were shown at 9:30 PM ET. Its run on CBS ended on August 8, 1953.

=== NBC (1954) ===
Replacing The Spike Jones Show, the series returned May 15, 1954, on NBC. It occupied the 8:00 PM ET time slot on Saturday nights. Bill Cullen was the host for the first several weeks until Jimmy Nelson took over in July. The final episode aired on August 21, 1954.

== Gameplay ==
Bank on the Stars was a memory game in which contestants, competing in two-person teams, viewed scenes from recently released feature films and were quizzed on what they had just seen. Each correct response earns the winning team $50, and the team with the most money at the end of the game advanced to the bonus round. There, the contestants were asked more difficult questions about a different movie but they could only hear, not see, the film clip.

== Critical response ==
A review of the program's premiere episode in The New York Times said that Paar's opening monologue "left one wishing for something more substantial" and indicated that he lacked "mature confidence". The review also found fault with the show's format of quizzing contestants about film scenes that they had just viewed. It concluded, "If any effort was made to make the proceedings entertaining, such effort was not recognizable on the premiere."

John Crosby described Paar's work as quizmaster as "a sort of weak mixture of Bob Hope and Arthur Godfrey — Telling jokes like the former and exuding charm like the latter". Crosby wrote that none of the questions that he saw were "hard enough to tax the intellect of a six-year-old child, though they occasionally tax those of the contestants." He also noted, "The female contestants seem to be selected for their looks rather than the nimbleness of their minds".

An Associated Press review of the NBC version of the program commented, "Take Bill Cullen out of the latest version of a TV quiz, Bank on the Stars, and there would not be much left."

The trade publication Variety commented that replacing Cullen with Nelson as host did not improve the program. "It's a basically bad session," the review said — rather than blaming the hosts. The review added, "The question and answer periods lack complete interest."
