= Nina Russell =

American television writer and actress

- Born: Teresa Ventimiglia; November 24, 1930; New York, U.S.
- Died: December 19, 2019 (aged 89)
- Occupations: TV writer; actress; dancer
- Spouse(s): Ralph Dilena (m. 1950, divorced) Paul Winchell (m. 1961; div. 1972) Jerry Moore (m. 1975)
- Children: 3, including April Winchell
- Writing career
- Period: 1958–1970

Nina Russell (born Teresa Ventimiglia; November 24, 1930 – December 9, 2019) was an American television writer, actress, dancer and model, who collaborated extensively with her husband, ventriloquist-comedian Paul Winchell, as a regular writer—and sometime cast member—of Winchell-Mahoney Time (1965–1968), and, prior to that, KABC-TV's The Paul Winchell Show (1963-1964). Earlier still, Russell participated in one of the original Steve Allen Show's more notable episodes, NBC-TV's first live broadcast from Cuba. Russell is the mother of voice actress and radio host April Winchell.

== Early life and career ==
In June 1961, Back Stage's Marlene Pendleton informed readers that Russell "is a real Miss!"

She's been "Miss Playgirl" for Playboy Magazine, "Miss Lookalike" for Ava Gardner, as well as being on TV as an actress, comedienne for the past three years. That's Nina in Earl Wilson's column this week; jack of all trades, master of all.

In fact, the pertinent—and considerably briefer—Wilson excerpt differs in specifying Italian actress Gina Lollobrigida's likeness as the object of the contest in question, as well as including, in passing, the assertion that the "Copa girl" was "Sicilian-born".

Wherever she came from, Russell's first big break in the U.S. came in January 1958, appearing in a landmark episode of The Steve Allen Show, airing live from Havana's Hotel Riviera, the first live broadcast of a major U.S. network TV program from Cuba. Russell performs in the episode's Man on the Street segment, alongside series regulars Don Knotts, Tom Poston, and Louis Nye. (Note: Exactly how Russell came to be cast in this episode is not known, but it may be worthy of note that the hosting venue, Havana's Hotel Riviera, had just opened the previous month, and had, in the interim, been commemorating that opening with a lavish inaugural revue starring Ginger Rogers, just the sort of production in which Russell—consistently described, pre-1961, as either Copa girl, chorus girl, or simply dancer—could easily have been employed.)

Meanwhile, despite Back Stage's June '61 mention of Russell "on TV as an actress, comedienne for the past three years," any specific instances of such work appear to have gone both uncredited and unreported at the time. By contrast, not quite one week after the Back Stage piece, news regarding Winchell's impending marital realignment and, in particular, Russell's role therein, began to emerge. Ironically, it was like-named but unrelated entertainment writer Walter Winchell (Note: The respective birth names of latter and former being Walter Weinchel and Paul Wilchin.) who broke the story, prominently displayed. "Copa doll Nina Russell tells chums she'll marry star ventriloquist, who reportedly divorced his mate for her."

In April 1963, the premiere of KABC-TV's The Paul Winchell Show received a rave review from Variety'.

If the disarming air of spontaneity that characterized the premiere installment can be sustained and if novel, ingenious new ideas for exploring the imaginative sphere of children continue to be devised, then the series should spur the kind of word-of-mouth in family audience circles that could make it the dark horse click of the year [...] Orchids to Mr. Winchell for his sterling work. And much credit is also due co-writers George Kirgo and Nina Russell, director Wes Butler, set designer Bob Johnson and all others involved [...] [I]f all goes well and the basic idea is explored for its fullest and most rewarding possibilities, [it] could conceivably graduate to network status at some future time.

Rosy projections notwithstanding, the series scarcely made it to the new year, discontinued after the second January installment. On March 21 of that year, the Hollywood Palace episode featuring vocals of host Nat King Cole and guest Diahann Carroll also boasted an operating room sketch featuring Russell as the nurse to Winchell's doctor; three months later, the couple trekked to Anaheim for a two-week engagement at the Anaheim Bowl.

From 1965 through 1968, Russell directed and occasionally performed in Winchell-Mahoney Time.

== Personal life and death ==
As of April 1950, Russell (then Mrs. Tessie DiLena) was married to Ralph DiLena, an officer of the NYPD. On October 5, 1961, in Harrisburg, Pennsylvania's Dauphin County Courthouse, DiLena—having, in the interim, adopted the stage name, Nina Russell—wed the recently divorced Paul Winchell, likewise embarking on his second marriage. Their union produced one child, their frequent onscreen collaborator, April Winchell. They divorced in April 1972, and from 1975 until her death, Russell was out of show business and married to Nevada resident Jerry Moore.

Russell died "quietly in her sleep" on December 9, 2019, survived by her husband, her daughter April, and by two daughters from her first marriage.
