= The Dog (Seinfeld) =

- Seinfeld episode
- Episode no.: Season 3 Episode 4
- Directed by: Tom Cherones
- Written by: Larry David
- Production code: 303
- Original air date: October 9, 1991

Guest appearances
- Joseph Maher as Gavin; Tom Williams as Voice of Farfel (uncredited); Marvin Wright-Bey as Attendant #1; Kelly Wellman as Attendant #2; Norman Brenner as Man on Sidewalk (uncredited)

Episode chronology
← Previous "The Pen"	Next → "The Library"
- Seinfeld season 3

"The Dog" is the 21st episode of Seinfeld. The episode was the fourth episode of the show's third season. It was written by series co-creator Larry David and first aired on NBC on October 9, 1991.

== Plot ==
On a plane back to New York City, Jerry meets Gavin Polone, whose beloved dog, Farfel, is traveling in the baggage compartment. Gavin falls ill, requiring an emergency landing and hospitalization in Chicago. Jerry is unwillingly recruited to care for Farfel until Gavin can reclaim him.

Back in New York, Farfel proves to be hostile and noisy, eliciting impatience and verbal abuse from Jerry as Gavin fails to call or show. Jerry is particularly indignant about poop bagging, but is compelled to do so by his cleanliness complex. Jerry drops out from seeing the movie Prognosis Negative with George and Elaine, refusing to let Farfel defecate in his apartment in his absence—even when Elaine, desperate to see the movie with Jerry, offers to clean up.

With no other movie options, and without Jerry, George and Elaine awkwardly fail to find common ground until they start mocking Jerry's eccentricities together. However, George soon runs this topic dry, and realizes he has nothing to talk about besides sports.

Kramer is eager to break up with his girlfriend, Ellen, so Jerry and Elaine supportively reveal their pent-up criticisms of Ellen. Kramer is encouraged to melodramatically tell Ellen off, only to immediately apologize and make up just as melodramatically, and turns against Jerry and Elaine for badmouthing Ellen even as they backpedal. The three of them reconcile when Kramer breaks up with Ellen once more, and Jerry and Elaine feign disappointment.

Learning that Gavin was discharged from hospital days ago, Jerry intends to send Farfel to the pound. He renews the movie plans, but Elaine, feeling remorse, drops out to watch Farfel for the night; she is soon reduced to the same state as Jerry. Gavin finally arrives, claiming that he was separately hospitalized for Bell's palsy, and vouches for Farfel's virtues even as the unruly dog drags him away.

With no other movie options, Jerry watches Prognosis Negative with George behind Elaine's back, and is disappointed. He fails to talk Elaine out of seeing it with him.

== Production ==
In a deleted scene, Kramer reveals that he fed Farfel Turkish Taffy, which would have explained the dog's erratic behavior and frequent barking.

Four actors auditioned for the role of Farfel; it was ultimately given to Williams.

== Cultural references ==
Farfel was named after the advertising icon Farfel the Dog.

== Critical reception ==
Upon initial airing, the episode achieved a Nielsen rating of 12.3 and an audience share of 20, with roughly 17.2 million viewers.

David Sims of The A.V. Club, giving a grade of B+, writes that the episode is "an amusingly over-the-top one, with not one but two unseen, horrible characters, and it's the first episode with those great fake Seinfeld movie names. ... We never see the dog, and since he's a satanic hound that barks constantly and chews everything he sees, it's all the funnier that we don't. The "evil dog" joke gets old quickly but it works just enough because Jerry's OCD tendencies are so profoundly disturbed by having the dog in his bedroom."

== Legacy ==
Jerry delivers a monologue on people and dogs:

On my block, a lot of people walk their dogs, and I always see them walking along with their little poop bags, which to me is just the lowest function of human life. If aliens are watching this through telescopes, they're going to think the dogs are the leaders. If you see two life-forms, one of them's making a poop, the other one's carrying it for him, who would you assume is in charge?

This has been quoted (and mis-quoted) enough to permeate the culture, approaching catchphrase standards.
