= April Winchell =

American actress, voice actress and comedian (born 1960)

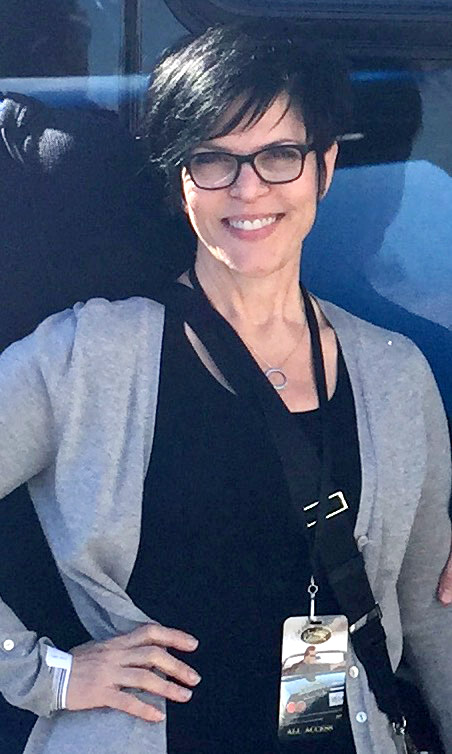
- Winchell in 2011
- Born: April Terri Winchell; January 4, 1960 (age 66); Whitestone, New York, U.S.
- Education: North Central Michigan College; Orange Coast College
- Occupations: Voice actress; comedian; radio host
- Years active: 1972–present
- Spouses: Mick Kuisel (m. 1996; div. 2013) John Foley (m. 2013)
- Parents: Paul Winchell (father); Nina Russell (mother)

April Terri Winchell (born January 4, 1960) is an American voice actress and comedian. Since 1996, she has been the voice of Clarabelle Cow.

== Early life ==
Born on January 4, 1960, in New York but raised in the Greater Los Angeles Area (primarily Woodland Hills), Winchell is the daughter of inventor, ventriloquist and comedian Paul Winchell and his second wife, actress-writer Nina—née Ventimiglia—Russell. In her weblog writings and appearances on radio, Winchell describes her childhood with many references to the great talent of her father as well as the many disturbing incidents owing to his mental health issues.

Winchell attended Sequoia Junior High School, North Central Michigan College, and Orange Coast College, where, in August 1977, her "vivacious acting and full-throated singing" as the female lead in OCC's summer theater production of the Michael Stewart-Jerry Herman musical, Mack and Mabel, found an enthusiastic audience in Los Angeles Times critic Richard Buffum.

== Career ==
=== Acting ===
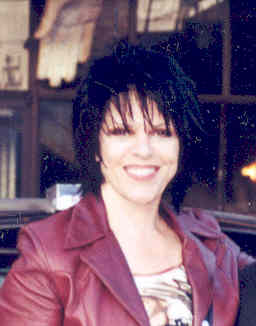
Winchell in Los Angeles, California in June 2004

Winchell's projects include the role of Sylvia in Wander Over Yonder, a Disney Channel animated series featuring Jack McBrayer in the title role. Created by The Powerpuff Girls producers Craig McCracken and Lauren Faust, the show chronicles the adventures of Wander and his trusty (and cynical) steed Sylvia, as they travel the universe. The series premiered on the Disney Channel in September 2013.

As a voice actress, she has been heard in hundreds of animated television series, such as Goof Troop (as Peg Pete), Recess (as Mrs. Muriel Finster), House of Mouse and Mickey Mouse Clubhouse (as Clarabelle Cow), Bonkers (as Lucky's wife, Dyl Piquel), Pepper Ann (as title character's mom, Lydia Pearson), and Kids from Room 402 (as Miss Gracie Graves the school teacher, along with several other characters that appear on the show), The Legend of Tarzan (taking over for Rosie O'Donnell as Terk in the original film), 101 Dalmatians: The Series (as Cruella De Vil), and SWAT Kats: The Radical Squadron (as Molly Mange).

She has also voiced characters in numerous films, including Antz, Who Framed Roger Rabbit, Monsters University and Rob Zombie's The Haunted World of El Superbeasto. Winchell portrayed the "Glendale Federal Bank" lady – a cranky, cynical customer alleviated by the service at her new bank – in a series of radio commercials, which Winchell wrote and directed herself. The commercials caught the attention of Roseanne Barr, who hired her as a writer on Barr's eponymous sitcom.

=== Radio ===
Besides her many contributions to radio advertising as a director, writer, and performer, Winchell also hosted a radio talk show program on KFI, a Los Angeles radio station. This weekend program aired for three years, and enjoyed the fastest growth audience in the history of the station. Subsequent to the end of this program in November 2002, she appeared semi-regularly on the Ask Mr. KABC program, on KABC, an AM station also in Los Angeles – until the show ended in February 2007.

In 2005, Winchell signed a deal with U.S. pay-TV service HBO to develop and host a show on Sirius Satellite Radio. However, on her official website on May 3, 2006, she announced that negotiations had stalled out between HBO and Sirius, leaving her program in limbo.

On March 16, 2007, she returned to semi-regular radio appearances on The Marc "Mr. K" Germain Show on KTLK-AM (the new show hosted by the former Mr. KABC) and appeared twice a month. (Her appearances on Germain's show are available at her website in addition to KTLK's website.) During March, Winchell was "banned for life" from KABC (AM) in Los Angeles at the behest of ABC radio host Bill O'Reilly, over a retelling of an occurrence she dubbed "Croissantgate" (KABC provided Bill O'Reilly with croissants that were not fresh enough for his taste, causing a commotion at the station).

=== Theater ===
Winchell (right) providing commentary at the 1998 Christopher Street West Gay Pride Parade in West Hollywood.

As a musical theater actress, Winchell starred as Ado Annie in the Columbia Artists revival of Oklahoma!, and appeared opposite Kevin Spacey in Gypsy.

Winchell wrote and starred as Sheila Sands in her show at the Roxy Theatre in Los Angeles to sold out crowds. The show was produced by Lily Tomlin and Jane Wagner, who discovered her at Cafe Largo in Hollywood. Winchell reprised the character to open for Brad Garrett at the MGM Grand in Las Vegas in 2013.

She has also been a frequent panelist on the live-stage version of What's My Line at the Acme Comedy Theatre in Hollywood.

=== Advertising ===
In 1992, Winchell and her then-husband Mick Kuisel formed Radio Savant Productions, a radio advertising production company. Since that time, Winchell has received many awards including Cannes, Clio, The $100,000 Mercury Award and The International Grand Andy (bestowed by The Association of Independent Commercial Producers) – it was the only time the Andy was given for radio. Winchell also provided the award-winning radio and television advertising for Big Bear Mountain Resorts for over 20 years.

=== Internet ===
In October 2009, Winchell (under the pseudonym "Helen Killer") launched Regretsy, a blog website which satirized Etsy. Within four days, the site had received nearly 90 million hits. This huge viral success caught the attention of Random House, who subsequently won a bidding war to publish a book based around the Regretsy website. The book, which was published April 6, 2010, features humorous and bizarre crafts and artwork from several different artists, as well as essays about Winchell's personal life, childhood and own crafting failures. As of March 1, 2012, the Regretsy site had raised over $200,000 for charitable causes. The popularity of Regretsy's "Not Remotely Steampunk" section even inspired a viral "chap hop" music video. Winchell ceased updating Regretsy on February 1, 2013.

Winchell made several appearances on early episodes of the internet broadcast series "Talk Radio One," interviewed by former Los Angeles radio personality Marc Germain. She became a weekly guest on the series beginning in 2017.

=== Other work ===
Winchell worked as a voice director for the 1996 video game Toonstruck and voiced Ms. Fit, Polly, Punisher Polly and Dr. Payne's Receptionist. She also worked as a punch writer for Recess: School's Out and wrote three episodes of the American sitcom Roseanne.

== Personal life ==
Winchell and Kevin Spacey dated after high school. She is married to John Foley.

== Filmography ==
=== Film ===
List of voice performances in animated feature and direct-to-video films
| Year | Title | Role | Notes |
|---|---|---|---|
| 1988 | Who Framed Roger Rabbit | Mrs. Herman, Baby Herman's baby voice | |
| 1990 | Jetsons: The Movie | Additional voices | |
| 1997 | Mighty Ducks the Movie: The First Face-Off | Tanya | Direct-to-video |
| 1998 | Beauty and the Beast: Belle's Magical World | Chandeleria | Direct-to-video |
| 1998 | Pocahontas II: Journey to a New World | Additional voices | Direct-to-video |
| 1998 | Antz | Additional voices | |
| 1999 | Mickey's Once Upon a Christmas | Mom, Old Woman, Firefighter #1 | Direct-to-video |
| 1999 | Tarzan | Terk's Mom | |
| 2000 | Alvin and the Chipmunks Meet the Wolfman | Madame Raya | Direct-to-video |
| 2001 | Recess: School's Out | Miss Finster, Mrs. Detweiller | |
| 2001 | Lady and the Tramp II: Scamp's Adventure | Mrs. Mahoney | Direct-to-video |
| 2001 | Mickey's Magical Christmas: Snowed in at the House of Mouse | Mother Von Drake | Direct-to-video |
| 2001 | Recess Christmas: Miracle on Third Street | Miss Finster | Direct-to-video |
| 2002 | The Hunchback of Notre Dame II | Lady DeBurne | Direct-to-video |
| 2002 | Tarzan & Jane | Terk | Direct-to-video |
| 2002 | Mickey's House of Villains | Clarabelle Cow | Direct-to-video |
| 2003 | Recess: All Growed Down | Miss Finster | Direct-to-video |
| 2003 | Recess: Taking the Fifth Grade | Miss Finster | Direct-to-video |
| 2004 | Mickey, Donald, Goofy: The Three Musketeers | Clarabelle Cow | Direct-to-video |
| 2004 | Mickey's Twice Upon a Christmas | Additional voices | Direct-to-video |
| 2005 | Mulan II | Matchmaker | Direct-to-video |
| 2005 | Kim Possible Movie: So the Drama | Reporter | Direct-to-video |
| 2005 | Tarzan II | Additional voices | Direct-to-video |
| 2005 | Kronk's New Groove | Hildy, Marge, Tina, Additional voices | Direct-to-video |
| 2006 | Asterix and the Vikings | Vikea | |
| 2006 | Queer Duck: The Movie | Additional voices | Direct-to-video |
| 2006 | The Fox and the Hound 2 | Additional voices | Direct-to-video |
| 2007 | Happily N'Ever After | Additional voices | |
| 2009 | The Haunted World of El Superbeasto | Various voices | Direct-to-video |
| 2010 | Superman/Batman: Apocalypse | Female Radio Caller #1 | Direct-to-video |
| 2012 | Strange Frame | Pawnbroker | |
| 2013 | Monsters University | Additional voices | |
| 2013 | Despicable Me 2 | Additional voices | |
| 2015 | Lego DC Comics Super Heroes: Justice League vs. Bizarro League | Giganta | |
| 2015 | Home | Boovs | |
| 2020 | Phineas and Ferb the Movie: Candace Against the Universe | Computer Voice | |

=== Television ===
List of voice performances in animated shows
| Year | Title | Role | Notes |
|---|---|---|---|
| 1972–1973 | Kid Power | Connie | |
| 1992 | Defenders of Dynatron City | Additional voices | TV special |
| 1992 | Monster in My Pocket: The Big Scream | Helga | TV special |
| 1992 | Darkwing Duck | Bianca Beakley | |
| 1992–1993 | Goof Troop | Peg Pete, various voices | 77 episodes |
| 1993 | Tom & Jerry Kids | Additional voices | Episode: "Penthouse Mouse/12 Angry Sheep/The Ant Attack" |
| 1993 | Marsupilami | Additional voices | Episode: "A Spotless Record/A Boy and His Crab/Mars vs. Man" |
| 1993 | Problem Child | Additional voices | |
| 1993 | Hollyrock-a-Bye Baby | Additional voices | Television film |
| 1993–1994 | Bonkers | Dyl Piquel | 20 episodes |
| 1993–1994 | SWAT Kats: The Radical Squadron | Molly Mange | 5 episodes |
| 1994 | Aladdin | Woman | Episode: "The Flawed Couple" |
| 1995 | Bump in the Night | Auntie Matta, Princess, the Cute Dolls | Episodes: "Auntie Matta" and "Beauty and the Bump" |
| 1995 | Shnookums & Meat Funny Cartoon Show | Doris Deer, Wowee Woman, Receptionist, Duck Lady, Squirrel Girl, | 8 episodes |
| 1995–1999 | Timon & Pumbaa | Additional voices | 7 episodes |
| 1996 | Gargoyles | Shauna Coyle | Episode: "Broadway Goes to Hollywood" |
| 1996 | Earthworm Jim | Ilene | Episode: "Lounge Day's Journey into Night" |
| 1996 | Quack Pack | Female Viking, various voices | 2 episodes |
| 1996–1997 | Mighty Ducks | Tanya | 26 episodes |
| 1996–1997 | Jungle Cubs | Various characters | 4 episodes |
| 1996, 1998 | The Spooktacular New Adventures of Casper | Miss C. / Baby Casper | 2 episodes |
| 1997 | The Blues Brothers: The Animated Series | Various characters | 2 episodes |
| 1997 | Johnny Bravo | Various characters | Episode: "Johnny Bravo/Jungle Boy in 'Mr. Monkeyman'/Johnny Bravo and the Amazon Women" |
| 1997 | Nightmare Ned | Queen Ant | Episode: "Ants" |
| 1997 | Extreme Ghostbusters | The Waitress | Episode: "The Jersey Devil" |
| 1997–1998 | 101 Dalmatians: The Series | Cruella De Vil | 61 episodes |
| 1997–2001 | Pepper Ann | Lydia Pearson | 62 episodes; 84 segments |
| 1997–2001 | Recess | Muriel Finster | 21 episodes |
| 1998 | Hercules | Amazon Guard | Episode: "Hercules and the Girdle of Hippolyte" |
| 1998 | Men in Black: The Series | Troy's Mother | Episode: "The Quick Clone Syndrome" |
| 1998 | All Dogs Go to Heaven: The Series | Tiffany | Episode: "Bess and Itchy's Dog School Reunion" |
| 1998–1999 | Mad Jack the Pirate | Additional voices | 13 episodes |
| 1998–1999 | CatDog | Sadie, Space Grannies | 2 episodes |
| 1998–2001 | Oh Yeah! Cartoons | Various voices | 3 episodes |
| 1999 | The Wild Thornberrys | Gemsbok #2 | Episode: "Rain Dance" |
| 1999 | Cow and Chicken | Receptionist, Meter Maid | Episode: "The Full Mounty" |
| 1999–2000 | Mickey Mouse Works | Clarabelle Cow | 10 episodes |
| 1999–2000 | Kids from Room 402 | Gracie Graves | |
| 2000 | Buzz Lightyear of Star Command | Pwerta | Episode: "Stress Test" |
| 2000 | Rugrats | Argenta | Episode: "Don't Poop on My Parade" |
| 2000–2001 | Clerks: The Animated Series | Judge | 4 episodes |
| 2001–2003 | House of Mouse | Clarabelle Cow | 28 episodes |
| 2001–2003 | The Legend of Tarzan | Terk / Bibi's Mother | 37 episodes |
| 2001–2004 | Lloyd in Space | Nora Nebulon | 35 episodes |
| 2002 | Totally Spies! | Ms. Catherine Brooks, Principal Vegan | Episode: "Silicon Valley Girls" |
| 2002 | Ozzy & Drix | Lunchlady | Episode: "Gas of Doom" |
| 2002 | Rapsittie Street Kids: Believe In Santa | Nana | Television film |
| 2002–2003 | Teamo Supremo | Hypnotheria | |
| 2003 | The Mummy | Aglaophone #1 | Episode: "The Enemy of My Enemy" |
| 2003 | Rocket Power | Announcer | Episode: "Cinco de Twisto/Saving Lt. Ryan" |
| 2003–2006 | Lilo & Stitch: The Series | Mrs. Edmonds, Aunt Stacy | 35 episodes |
| 2003; 2007 | Kim Possible | Bernice, Miss Hatchet, Trisha | 8 episodes |
| 2004 | Fatherhood | Ms. Huffington | Episode: "Love me Dude" |
| 2004 | As Told by Ginger | Cleaning Lady | Episode: "A Lesson in Tightropes" |
| 2006 | Bratz | Gertrude | Episode: "Survivor" |
| 2006 | Catscratch | Various characters | Episode: "Mall Adjusted/Clan Destiny" |
| 2006 | The X's | Various characters | Episode: "Accidental Hero/Untitled" |
| 2006–2007 | Eloise: The Animated Series | Various characters | 5 episodes |
| 2006–2007 | Legion of Super Heroes | Winema Wazzo | 2 episodes |
| 2006–2016 | Mickey Mouse Clubhouse | Clarabelle Cow | 52 episodes |
| 2007 | The Grim Adventures of Billy & Mandy | Mrs. Slither | Episode: "Detention X" |
| 2007 | Slacker Cats | Additional voices | Episode: "Mexico" |
| 2007–2008 | Tak & the Power of Juju | Donna | 3 episodes |
| 2009–2014 | Phineas and Ferb | Blanca Dishon, Mona, Princess Leia | |
| 2009 | King of the Hill | Various characters | Episode: "Uncool Customer" |
| 2010–2011 | Kick Buttowski: Suburban Daredevil | Helga | |
| 2011 | Curious George | Chilla DeWinter, Melanie | 2 episodes |
| 2011 | Scooby-Doo! Mystery Incorporated | Weena | Episode: "Night Fright" |
| 2011 | Fish Hooks | Lady Eelbottom | Episode: "Oscar Makes an Impression" |
| 2011–2014 | Jake and the Never Land Pirates | Singsong Bird, Slippery Serpent | 4 episodes |
| 2011–present | Minnie's Bow-Toons | Clarabelle Cow | 40 episodes |
| 2012 | Robot and Monster | Grandma, Arpa Default | 4 episodes |
| 2012–2015 | Gravity Falls | Ma Duskerton | 3 episodes |
| 2013 | Ben 10: Omniverse | Queen Voratia Rumbletum | Episode: "Tummy Trouble" |
| 2013 | Kung Fu Panda: Legends of Awesomeness | Mistress Mugan | Episode: "Tigress Tale" |
| 2013 | Monsters vs. Aliens | Soap Opera Alien, Educational Television | Episode: "Educational Television" |
| 2013–2016 | Wander Over Yonder | Sylvia | Main role |
| 2014–2015 | Breadwinners | Mama Monster | |
| 2015 | Star vs. the Forces of Evil | Riddle Sphinx | 2 episodes |
| 2016–2018 | Mickey Mouse | Clarabelle Cow | 3 episodes |
| 2017–2021 | Mickey Mouse Mixed-Up Adventures | Clarabelle Cow | 33 episodes |
| 2017 | Sofia the First | The Dutchess/Windy | 2 episodes |
| 2018–2021 | DuckTales | Black Heron, Zenith, Chip, Dale, Monterey Jack, Zipper, additional voices | 8 episodes |
| 2019 | Amphibia | Tuti, Fens, Braddock | 3 episodes |
| 2020 | DC Super Hero Girls | Antiope | Episode: "#AwesomeAuntAntiope" |
| 2020–2023 | The Wonderful World of Mickey Mouse | Clarabelle Cow | Main cast |
| 2021 | Kid Cosmic | Krosh | 3 episodes |
| 2021 | Mickey's Tale of Two Witches | Clarabelle Cow | Television special |
| 2021–2025 | Mickey Mouse Funhouse | Clarabelle Cow | Main cast |
| 2022 | The Cuphead Show! | Hoagie Mom, Kindly Old Woman, Head Penguin | 2 episodes |
| 2025 | Mickey Mouse Clubhouse+ | Clarabelle Cow | Main cast |
| 2025 | The Mighty Nein | Various characters | |

=== Video games ===
List of voice performances in video games
| Year | Title | Role | Notes |
|---|---|---|---|
| 1991 | Hare Raising Havoc | Baby Herman, Mrs. Herman | |
| 1996 | Animated Storybook: Toy Story | Scrabble Narrator | |
| 1996 | Toonstruck | Ms. Fit, Polly | |
| 1998 | Disney's Math Quest with Aladdin | Bizarrah | |
| 2008 | Disney Think Fast | Clarabelle Cow | |
| 2010 | Epic Mickey | Clarabelle Cow | |
| 2011 | Kinect Disneyland Adventures | Queen of Hearts | |
| 2012 | Epic Mickey 2: The Power of Two | Clarabelle Cow | |
| 2025 | Disney Speedstorm | Queen of Hearts | |

=== Live-action ===
List of acting performances in television shows
| Year | Title | Role | Notes |
|---|---|---|---|
| 1994 | Limboland | Various | Episode: "Pilot" |
| 1996 | Grace Under Fire | Ms. Salem | Episode: "Grace Tests Out" |
| 1999 | Time of Your Life | Karen | Episode: "The Time She Got Mobbed" |
| 2002 | That '80s Show | Mrs. Nealon | Episode: "After the Kiss" |
