= The Library (Seinfeld) =

- Seinfeld episode
- Episode no.: Season 3 Episode 5
- Directed by: Joshua White
- Written by: Larry Charles
- Production code: 304
- Original air date: October 16, 1991

Guest appearances
- Philip Baker Hall as Lt. Joe Bookman; Ashley Gardner as Marion; Harris Shore as Mr. Lippman; Biff Yeager as Mr. Heyman; Cynthia Szigeti as Sherry Becker; Neal Lerner as Guy in the Library (The 'Shusher')

Episode chronology
← Previous "The Dog"	Next → "The Parking Garage"
- Seinfeld season 3

"The Library" is the 22nd episode of the NBC sitcom Seinfeld. Written by staff writer Larry Charles, it was the fifth episode of the show's third season. It aired on October 16, 1991.

It was the only episode of Seinfeld directed by Joshua White.

== Plot ==
The New York Public Library notifies Jerry that he owes 20 years of library fines for failing to return a copy of Henry Miller's Tropic of Cancer that he borrowed in 1971. Jerry is adamant that he returned the book, vividly remembering that he did so in the company of classmate Sherry Becker. However, he fails to plead his case to "library investigation officer" Lt. Joe Bookman, an idealistic, hard-nosed crusader who vows to guard the library system against miscreants.

George suspects that a homeless man living outside the New York Public Library Main Branch is Mr. Heyman, his high school physical education teacher. After relentlessly bullying George and giving him a failing grade, Heyman was finally fired for ganging up with George's classmates to give him a wedgie. Needing to confirm whether he ruined Heyman's life, George introduces himself to the homeless man, from whom he receives another wedgie.

Despite scoffing at library patrons, Kramer strikes up a romance with Marion, a librarian, and becomes enamored with her poetry, which moves him to tears. However, her absence from work to visit Kramer and their after-hours rendezvous in the library draw Bookman's wrath.

At Pendant Publishing, after Elaine's regular lunch order is not picked up, she suspects that her job is at risk. After seeing Mr. Lippman's cold reception towards a Christopher Columbus biography recommended by Jerry, Elaine presents Marion's tear-jerking poetry to him to no avail.

Jerry reconnects with Sherry to corroborate his story, but her account of events is entirely different. Jerry realizes that he actually returned Tropic of Capricorn with her, having lent Tropic of Cancer to George; George then lost the book during the wedgie incident. Jerry duly pays his fine, while the final scene shows the book still in Heyman's possession as he sleeps in an alley.

== Reception ==
Philip Baker Hall's role as Lt. Bookman, whom he played in imitation of Jack Webb's Sergeant Joe Friday on Dragnet, was very well received. It was considered to be one of the best guest appearances on Seinfeld, and led to Hall receiving many other offers of work. It was rated as one of his most memorable performances. When the New York Public Library decided to eliminate late fees in October 2021, it posted a satirical piece on its blog wishing Bookman a happy retirement.
