= Paul Winchell =

American ventriloquist and actor (1922–2005)

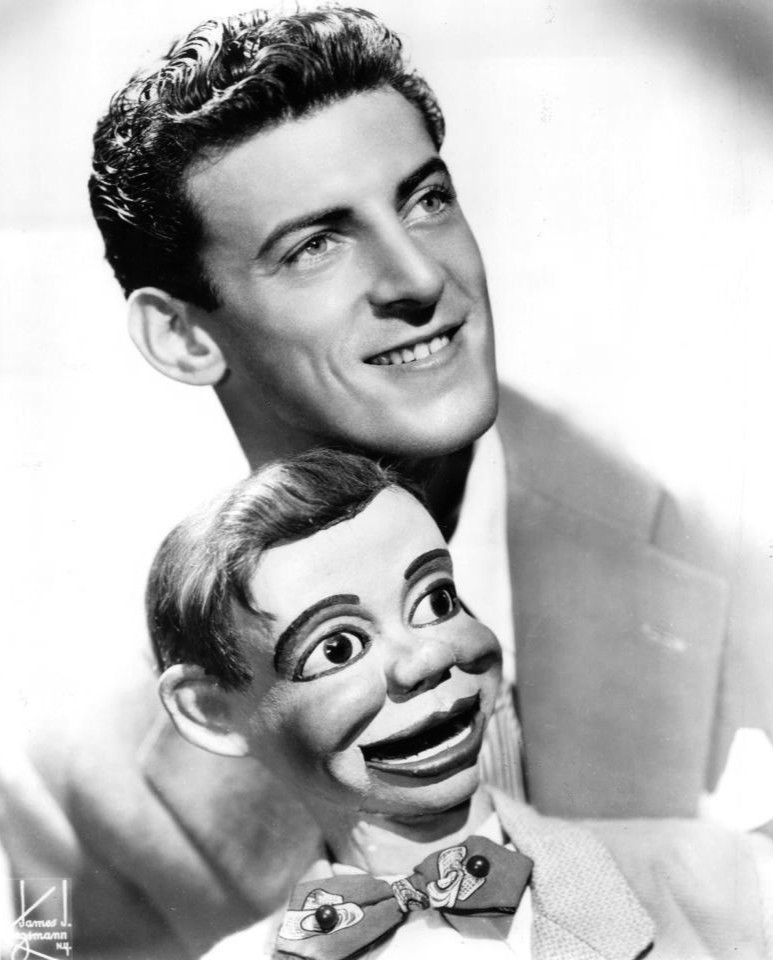
- Winchell in 1951
- Born: Paul Wilchinsky; December 21, 1922; New York City, U.S.
- Died: June 24, 2005 (aged 82); Moorpark, California, U.S.
- Occupations: Ventriloquist; comedian; actor; humanitarian; inventor
- Years active: 1938–1999
- Spouse(s): Dorothy Movitz (m. 1944; div. 1960) Nina Russell (m. 1961; div. 1972) Jean Freeman (m. 1974)
- Children: 3, including April Winchell
- Website: www.paulwinchell.com (archive)

Paul Winchell (né Wilchinsky; December 21, 1922 – June 24, 2005) was an American ventriloquist, comedian, actor, humanitarian, and inventor whose career flourished in the 1950s and 1960s. From 1950 to 1954, he hosted The Paul Winchell Show, which also used two other titles during its prime time run on NBC: The Speidel Show, and What's My Name? From 1965 to 1968, Winchell hosted the children's television series Winchell-Mahoney Time.

He made guest appearances on television series from the late 1950s to the mid 1970s, such as Perry Mason, The Dick Van Dyke Show, McMillan & Wife, The Brady Bunch, The Donna Reed Show, and appearances as Homer Winch on The Beverly Hillbillies. In animation, Winchell was the original voice of Tigger, Dick Dastardly, Gargamel, Scrubbing Bubbles, and other characters.

He also had medical training and became one of the first people to patent a mechanical artificial heart, implantable in the chest cavity (US Patent #3097366 of 1963). Winchell has been honored with a star on the Hollywood Walk of Fame for his work in television.

== Early life, family and education ==
Born Paul Wilchinsky in New York City on December 21, 1922, he was the son of Solomon Wilchinsky and Clara Fuchs. His father was a tailor. His grandparents were Jewish immigrants from Congress Poland and Austria-Hungary.

At age 6, his legs atrophied after contracting polio. When he was 12 or 13, he came across a magazine advertisement offering a ventriloquism kit for ten cents. Back at school, he asked his art teacher, Jero Magon, if he could receive class credit for creating a ventriloquist's dummy. Magon was agreeable, and Winchell thanked him by naming his creation Jerry Mahoney. Winchell went back to reading magazines, gathering jokes from them and putting together a comedy routine, which he then took to the Major Bowes Amateur Hour in 1938, winning first prize. A touring offer, playing various theaters with the Major Bowes Review, was part of the prize. Bandleader Ted Weems saw the young Winchell while on tour; he visited Winchell and made him an offer of employment. Winchell accepted and became a professional at age 14.

== Careers ==
=== career as a ventriloquist ===
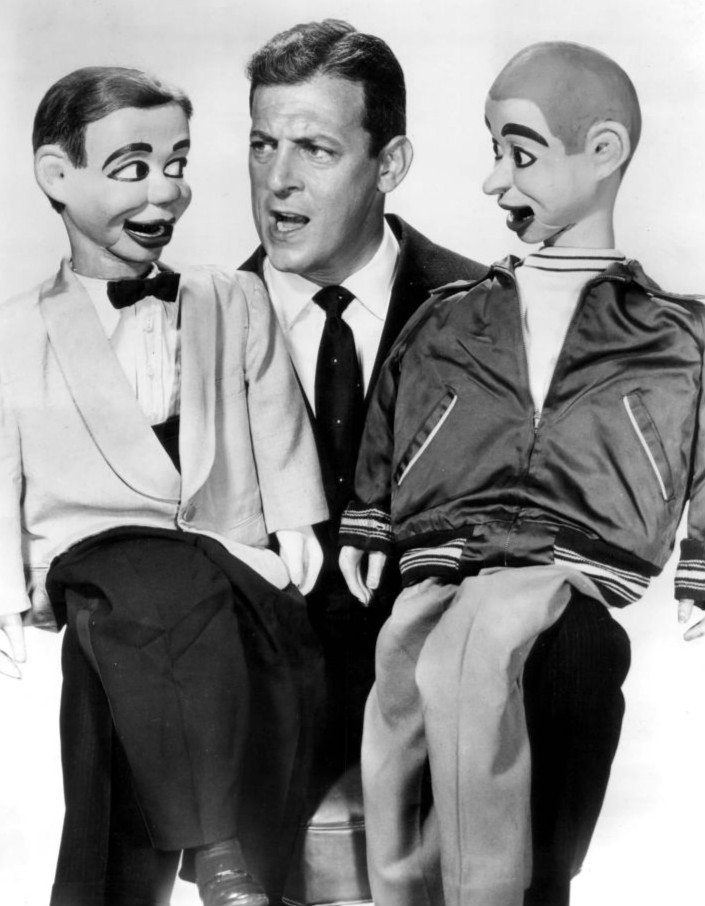
Winchell with Jerry Mahoney (left) and Knucklehead Smiff (right) in 1958

Winchell's best-known ventriloquist dummies were Jerry Mahoney and Knucklehead Smiff. Mahoney was carved by Chicago-based figure maker Frank Marshall. Sometime later Winchell had basswood copies of Jerry's head made by a commercial duplicating service. One became the upgraded Jerry Mahoney that is seen primarily throughout Winchell's television career. He modified two other copies to create Knucklehead Smiff. The television versions of Jerry and Knucklehead also featured Winchell's innovation of actors slipping their hands into the sleeves of the dummies, giving the visual effect of gesturing with their hands while "conversing" with each other. The original Marshall Jerry Mahoney and one copy of Knucklehead Smiff are in storage at the Smithsonian Institution. The other two figures are in the collection of illusionist David Copperfield.

Winchell's first show as a ventriloquist was on radio with Jerry Mahoney in 1943. The program was short-lived, however, as he was overshadowed by Edgar Bergen. Winchell also created Ozwald, a character that resembled Humpty Dumpty. The effect was accomplished by painting eyes and a nose on his chin, then adding a "body" covering the rest of his face, and finally electronically turning the camera image upside down. In 1961, Berwin Novelties introduced a home version of the character that included an Ozwald body, creative pencils to draw the eyes and nose, and a "magic mirror" that automatically turned a reflection upside down.

In 1948, Winchell and Joseph Dunninger were featured on Floor Show on NBC. Recorded via kinescope and replayed on WNBQ-TV in Chicago, the 8:30–9 p.m. Central Time show on Thursdays was the station's first midweekly program.

During the 1950s, Winchell hosted children's (The Paul Winchell and Jerry Mahoney Show) and adult programs with his figures for NBC Television, and later for syndication. The NBC Saturday morning program, sponsored by Tootsie Roll, featured a clubhouse motif and a theme song co-written by Winchell and his longtime bandleader and on-air sidekick, Milton Delugg. The theme song was titled "HOORAY, HOORAH" and featured the secret password "SCOTTY WOTTY DOO DOO". An ending song titled "Friends, Friends, Friends" was sung by the children in the audience. In October 1956, Winchell moved to ABC, hosting Circus Time on Thursday evening for one season before returning to Winchell-Mahoney on Sunday afternoons. On one episode in late 1959, The Three Stooges appeared on the show to promote their joint feature film venture, Stop, Look and Laugh. Winchell made an appearance on Nanny and the Professor (Season 2, Episode 13) as a "mean old man" (a puppeteer who had retired into seclusion after losing his wife in an accident). In 1996, Winchell contracted with figure maker Tim Selberg to construct a more contemporary version of Jerry Mahoney, which Winchell described as "Disney-esque". Winchell used the new figure version to pitch a new TV series idea to Michael Eisner. In 2009, Winchell was featured in the comedy documentary I'm No Dummy, directed by Bryan W. Simon.

=== Voice acting career ===
Winchell's career after 1968 included various voice roles for animated television series. For Hanna-Barbera, he played the character Dick Dastardly in multiple series (including Wacky Races and Dastardly and Muttley in their Flying Machines); Clyde and Softy on Wacky Races and The Perils of Penelope Pitstop; Fleegle on The Banana Splits Adventure Hour; and Gargamel on The Smurfs.

Winchell had also at one point, auditioned for the role of the Pillsbury Doughboy for the Pillsbury Company commercials, but lost out to Paul Frees.

He also provided the voice of Bubi Bear in Help!... It's the Hair Bear Bunch! in 1971, Revs on Wheelie and the Chopper Bunch, Moe on The Robonic Stooges, and Shake on The CB Bears. In 1973, he did the voice of Goober the Dog on the H-B show Goober and the Ghost Chasers and also guest starred as the rain-making villain on an episode of Hong Kong Phooey. For Disney, Winchell voiced Tigger in Disney's Winnie-the-Pooh featurettes, and won a Grammy Award for Best Children's Music Album for his performance in Winnie the Pooh and Tigger Too.

Beginning with the television series The New Adventures of Winnie the Pooh, he alternated in the role with Jim Cummings, the current voice of Pooh. Winchell's final performances as Tigger were in 1999 for Winnie the Pooh: A Valentine for You and The Many Adventures of Winnie the Pooh attraction at Walt Disney World. After that, Jim Cummings permanently took over the role of Tigger, starting with Sing a Song with Pooh Bear in 1999 (though some of Winchell's vocals from previous Pooh animations were included). Other Disney roles included parts in The Aristocats as a Siamese cat named Shun Gon, and The Fox and the Hound as Boomer the woodpecker. He was also the original voice of Zummi Gummi on the TV series Disney's Adventures of the Gummi Bears for seasons 1–5; Jim Cummings took over for the final season in 1990.

Winchell provided the voices of Sam-I-Am and the unnamed character Sam pesters in Green Eggs and Ham from the animated television special Dr. Seuss on the Loose in 1973. He played Fleabag on The Oddball Couple, Fearless Freddy the Shark Hunter on the Pink Panther spinoff Misterjaw in 1976, as well as a number of one-shot characters in The Blue Racer series. In commercials, he voiced the character of Burger Chef for the fast food chain of the same name, the Scrubbing Bubbles for Dow Chemicals, and Mr. Owl for Tootsie Roll Pops.

From 1981 to 1989, Winchell voiced Gargamel on The Smurfs as well as on several Smurfs television movies. During the 1980s, he was called upon by Hanna-Barbera to reprise his role of Dick Dastardly on Yogi's Treasure Hunt (which was a tour de force, featuring all of the H-B characters) and later on Wake, Rattle and Roll (which was a Wacky Races spinoff). Also on the animated movie Yogi Bear and the Magical Flight of the Spruce Goose, he did the voice of the Dread Baron, who was previously voiced by John Stephenson on the Laff-a-Lympics.

=== Live-action work ===
Winchell (often with Jerry Mahoney) was a frequent guest panelist on What's My Line? in 1956. On the April 29 episode, in which Winchell was a panelist, the mystery guest was Edgar Bergen; after his identity was revealed, Jerry Mahoney and Mortimer Snerd carried on a conversation. Other work included on-camera guest appearances on such series as The Polly Bergen Show; The Virginian; The Lucy Show; Perry Mason; The Donna Reed Show; Dan Raven; The Brady Bunch; as Homer Winch on The Beverly Hillbillies; and as Claude Wilbur on The Dick Van Dyke Show. He appeared in a 1960 motion picture that included a compilation of Three Stooges shorts (Stop!, Look and Laugh), and also in the Jerry Lewis movie Which Way to the Front?.

Winchell appeared as himself in 1963 in the NBC game show Your First Impression. He appeared in the late 1960s in a sketch on Rowan and Martin's Laugh-in as a French ventriloquist named Lucky Pierre, who has the misfortune of having his elderly dummy die of a heart attack in the middle of his act. On Love, American Style, he appeared with fellow ventriloquist Shari Lewis in a sketch about two shy people in a waiting room who choose to introduce themselves to each other through their dummies.

=== Winchell-Mahoney Time ===
Winchell's most successful TV show was Winchell-Mahoney Time (1965–1968), a children's show written by his wife, actress Nina Russell. Winchell played several onscreen characters, including Knucklehead Smiff's father, Bonehead Smiff. He also played himself as friend and adult adviser to Mahoney and Smiff. He also created "Mr. Goody-good," a surreal character, by painting eyes and a nose on his chin, covering his face with a small costume, then having the camera image inverted. The resulting pinheaded character seemed to have an immensely wide mouth and a highly mobile head. Winchell created this illusion by moving his chin back and forth. The show was produced at KTTV in Los Angeles, which was owned by Metromedia.

Winchell started "negotiating with Metromedia in 1970 to syndicate the 305 color segments of the show", but nothing came of it. Finally, "Winchell offered to purchase the tapes outright for $100,000. Metromedia responded with an ultimatum...: Agree on a syndication plan or the tapes will be destroyed." When Winchell did not agree, Metromedia carried out with its threat and the tapes were erased and destroyed. Winchell sued Metromedia and in 1986 a jury awarded him "$3.8 million for the value of the tapes and $14 million in punitive damages against Metromedia." Metromedia appealed the award all the way to the Supreme Court but was unsuccessful.

Winchell's last regular on-camera TV appearances working with his puppets were Storybook Squares, a children's version of the adult celebrity game show Hollywood Squares, which was seen Saturday mornings on NBC during the 1969 TV season, and Runaround, another children's TV game show seen Saturday mornings on NBC from September 1972 to September 1973.

== Other pursuits ==
=== Medical career and patents ===
Winchell was a pre-med student at Columbia University. He graduated from The Acupuncture Research College of Los Angeles in 1974 and became an acupuncturist. He also worked as a medical hypnotist at the Gibbs Institute in Hollywood. He owned more than 30 patents in his lifetime. He invented an artificial heart with the assistance of Henry Heimlich (inventor of the Heimlich maneuver) and held an early US patent for such a device. The University of Utah School of Medicine developed a similar apparatus around the same time, but when they tried to patent it, Winchell's patents were cited as prior art. Eventually, Winchell donated his heart patents to the university.

There is some debate as to how much of Winchell's design Robert Jarvik used in creating the Jarvik-7. Heimlich stated, "I saw the heart, I saw the patent, and I saw the letters. The basic principle used in Winchell's heart and Jarvik's heart is exactly the same." Jarvik denied that any of Winchell's design elements were incorporated into his device, which was first successfully implanted in Barney Clark in 1982.

Winchell established more medical patents while working on projects for the Leukemia Society (now known as the Leukemia & Lymphoma Society) and the American Red Cross. Other devices that he invented and patented included a disposable razor, a blood plasma defroster, a flameless cigarette lighter, a garter belt with no outwardly visible lines, a fountain pen with a retractable tip, and battery-heated gloves.

=== Philanthropy ===
In the 1980s, Winchell's concern about starvation in Africa led him to develop a method to raise tilapia in tribal villages and small communities. The fish thrives in brackish waters, which made it particularly well suited for sub-Saharan Africa. Winchell appeared before a Congressional committee with several other celebrities, including actors Richard Dreyfuss and Ed Asner, and Dr. Heimlich. The committee declined to finance a pilot program for the tilapia aquaculture project in Africa because it required digging wells in non-potable water.

== Personal life ==
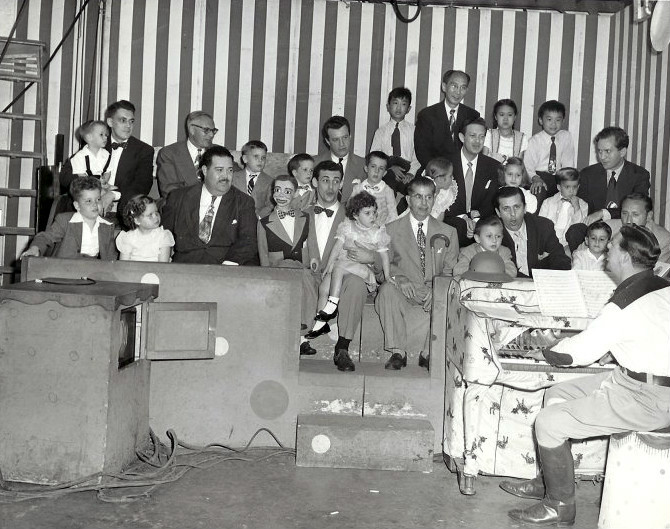
Winchell with his older daughter and Jerry Mahoney in the Howdy Doody studio audience, c. 1948

Winchell had three children: a son, Stacy Paul Winchell; a daughter, Stephanie, from his first marriage to Dorothy "Dottie" Movitz; and a daughter, April Winchell (the current voice of Clarabelle Cow), who is a comedian and voice actress, from his second marriage to actress-writer Nina Russell. His third wife was the former Jean Freeman.

In his autobiography, Winch (2004), Winchell divulged many details about his life that he had previously concealed from the public out of a desire for privacy, including early stories about an abusive childhood, a long history of depression, and at least one mental breakdown, which resulted in a short stint in an institution. The book contained information about the bad treatment which Winchell had received from his mother for a considerable period of time, and it also contained information about the mental impact that continued to negatively affect him for decades after his mother's death (Clara Wilchinski died when she was 58 years old in 1953, when Paul was 30 years old). The autobiography caused a major estrangement between Winchell and his children, prompting his daughter April to publicly defend her mother, who was negatively portrayed in the book.

After writing that religion brought more chaos to humanity than any "other invention of man" in God 2000: Religion Without the Bible (1982), Winchell expressed deist opinions in his 2004 book Protect God.

== Death ==
On June 24, 2005, Winchell died of natural causes, he died in his sleep at his home in Moorpark, California, at the age of 82. He was survived by his wife, his children, and three grandchildren. His remains were cremated, and his ashes were scattered over his home property.[39]

Winchell was estranged from his children, and as a result, they were not immediately informed of his death. Upon learning of it, April posted an entry on her website:

I got a phone call a few minutes ago, telling me that my father passed away yesterday. A source close to my dad, or at least, closer than I was, decided to tell me himself, instead of letting me find out on the news, which I appreciate. Apparently a decision had been made not to tell me, or my father's other children. My father was a very troubled and unhappy man. If there is another place after this one, it is my hope that he now has the peace that eluded him on earth.

Jim Cummings took on the role of Tigger full-time starting with The Tigger Movie (2000) after Winchell was rejected by the studio because at that time, the studio executives thought that his voice and his energy sounded and felt too old for the role of the character (at the time of the production of that movie, Winchell was 75 years old). Tom Kenny and Peter Woodward took on the role of Dick Dastardly and Hank Azaria, Rainn Wilson, and Mark Irons took on the role of Gargamel.

== Filmography ==
=== Film ===
Year	Title	Role	Notes
1960	Stop! Look! and Laugh	Himself – The Ventriloquist	Live action
1968	Winnie the Pooh and the Blustery Day	Tigger	Took over for Wally Boag after the featurette was aired
1970	The Aristocats	Shun Gon	
1970	Which Way to the Front?	Schroeder	Live action
1974	Winnie the Pooh and Tigger Too	Tigger	
1977	The Many Adventures of Winnie the Pooh	Tigger	
1981	The Fox and the Hound	Boomer	
1983	Winnie the Pooh and a Day for Eeyore	Tigger	
1997	Pooh's Grand Adventure: The Search for Christopher Robin	Tigger	Direct-to-Video, Nominated-Outstanding Individual Achievement for Voice Acting by a Male Performer in an Animated Feature Production
1999	Winnie the Pooh: Seasons of Giving	Tigger	Direct-To-Video; Archive footage
2002	Winnie the Pooh: A Very Merry Pooh Year	Tigger	Direct-To-Video; Archive footage
2002	The Many Adventures of Winnie the Pooh: The Story Behind the Masterpiece	Himself	Video documentary short
2009	I'm No Dummy	Himself	Archival Footage

=== Television ===
Year	Title	Role	Notes
1950–1961	The Paul Winchell Show	Host, Jerry Mahoney	Live action
1953	Season's Greetings	Himself	TV special
1956	What's My Line?	Himself – Panelist	
1956–1957	Circus Time	Host, Jerry Mahoney, Knucklehead Smiff	Live action
1962	Saints and Sinners	The Promoter	Live action, "Dear George, The Siamese Cat is Missing"
1962	The Beverly Hillbillies	Grandpa Winch	Live action
1963	77 Sunset Strip	Skeets Riley	Live action, "Falling Stars"
1964	Perry Mason	Henry Clement	Live action, "The Case of the Nervous Neighbor"
1965–1968	Winchell-Mahoney Time	Himself, Jerry Mahoney, Knucklehead Smiff, Bonehead Smiff, Mr. Goody-good	Live action
1966	Frankenstein Jr. and The Impossibles	Diabolical Dauber, Aquator, Devilish Dragster	The Impossibles segments
1966	The Dick Van Dyke Show	Claude Wilbur	Live action, "Talk to the Snail"
1967	The Lucy Show	Himself, Doc Putman	Live action, "Lucy and Paul Winchell"
1967	The Dean Martin Show	Himself	"Episode #2.29"
1968	The Virginian	Jingo	Live action, "Dark Corridor"
1968–1969	Rowan and Martin's Laugh-In	Lucky Pierre	Live-Action
1968–1970	Wacky Races	Dick Dastardly, Clyde, Private Meekly, Sawtooth	
1968–1970	The Banana Splits	Fleegle, Cuckoo, Goofy Gopher	
1969	The Flying Nun	Claudio	Live action, "My Sister the Star"
1969–1970	Dastardly and Muttley in Their Flying Machines	Dick Dastardly, The General, Additional voices	
1969–1970	The Perils of Penelope Pitstop	Clyde, Softy, Additional voices	
1969–1970	Here's Lucy	French Knife Thrower, Jeweler, Carlo, The Tailor	Live action, "Lucy, the Cement Worker", "Lucy and Liberace"
1970	Nanny and the Professor	Herbert T. Peabody	Live action, "The Humanization of Herbert T. Peabody"
1971	The Pebbles and Bamm-Bamm Show	Rockhead, Father	"Mayor May Not"
1971	The Brady Bunch	Skip Farnum	Live action, "And Now, a Word from Our Sponsor"
1971	Curiosity Shop	The King of Id	Episode: "How Do You Fix a Broken Funnybone?"
1971–1972	Help!... It's the Hair Bear Bunch!	Bubi Bear, Furface the Lion, Slicks the Fox, Tiptoes the Ostrich, Gabby the Parrot, Specs the Mole, Pipsqueak the Mouse	He did the voice of Slicks in the first episode, but from then on the character was voiced by Daws Butler, who also voiced Furface in some episodes. Also, Winchell did the voice of Pipsqueak in "Bridal Boo Boo" while in "Love Bug Bungle", the character was voiced by Janet Waldo.
1972	McMillan & Wife	TV Interviewer	Live action, "Cop of the Year"
1972	A Christmas Story	Goober	TV special
1972	Why We Have Elections, or The Kings of Snark	The Narrator	TV short
1972	The ABC Saturday Superstar Movie	Fleegle, additional voices	"The Banana Splits in Hocus Pocus Park" & "Tabitha and Adam and the Clown Family"
1972–1973	The New Scooby-Doo Movies	Additional voices	
1972–1973	Runaround (game show)	Host	Jerry Mahoney and Knucklehead Smiff made frequent appearances
1973	Circle of Fear	Mr. Carlson	Live action, "The Ghost of Potter's Field"
1973	Yogi's Gang	Sheik of Selfishness	"The Sheik of Selfishness"
1973	Dr. Seuss on the Loose	Sam-I-Am, Guy-Am-I, Sneetches	TV short
1973–1975	Goober and the Ghost Chasers	Goober, Additional voices	
1974	Hong Kong Phooey	Mr. Shrink, The Mayor	"Dr. Disguiso & The Incredible Mr. Shrink"
1974–1975	These Are the Days	Additional voices	
1974–1975	Wheelie and the Chopper Bunch	Revs, Captain Tough, Mailman, Lifeguard	
1975	Adams of Eagle Lake	Monty	Live action, "Treasure Chest Murder"
1975	The Tiny Tree	Turtle	TV short
1975	The Oddball Couple	Fleabag	
1976–1977	The Pink Panther Show	Fearless Freddy	
1976–1977	Clue Club	Woofer, Additional voices	
1977	CB Bears	Shake	Shake, Rattle & Roll segment
1977–1978	The Skatebirds	Moe, The Amazing Bordoni, Professor Octane, Blob Leader, Woofer	The Robonic Stooges and Woofer & Wimper, Dog Detectives segments
1977–1978	Fred Flintstone and Friends	Goober, Additional Voices	
1978	To Catch a Halibut	Fearless Freddy	TV short
1978	Hanna-Barbera's All-Star Comedy Ice Revue	Bubi Bear/Fleegle	TV special
1979	Casper and the Angels	Additional voices	
1979	The Super Globetrotters	Bad Blue Bart, The Phantom Cowboy	
1980–1982	Scooby-Doo and Scrappy-Doo	Additional voices	
1980–1982	Heathcliff	Marmaduke, Phil Winslow, Additional voices	
1981	Trollkins	Mayor Lumpkin	
1981	The Flintstones: Wind-Up Wilma	Umpire, Thief, Reporter	TV film
1981–1989	The Smurfs	Gargamel	
1982	My Smurfy Valentine	Gargamel	TV special
1982	The Smurfs Christmas Special	Gargamel	TV special
1982	The Smurfs' Springtime Special	Gargamel	TV special
1982	Spider-Man	Uncle Ben, Silvermane	2 episodes
1982–1983	Meatballs & Spaghetti	Additional voices	
1983	The Smurfic Games	Gargamel	TV special
1984	Here are the Smurfs	Gargamel	TV movie
1985	The Jetsons	Dr. Input	"S'No Relative"
1985	Disney Family Album	Himself	"Voice Actors"
1985–1988	Yogi's Treasure Hunt	Dick Dastardly, Additional voices	
1985–1990	Disney's Adventures of the Gummi Bears	Zummi Gummi	(Seasons 1–5)
1986	The Kingdom Chums: Little David's Adventure	King Saul	TV film
1986	Smurfquest	Gargamel	TV movie
1987	Yogi Bear and the Magical Flight of the Spruce Goose	Dread Baron	TV film
1988–1990	The New Adventures of Winnie the Pooh	Tigger, Additional voices	Seasons 1–3
1990–1991	Wake, Rattle and Roll	Dick Dastardly	Fender Bender 500 segment
1991	Winnie the Pooh and Christmas Too	Tigger	TV special
1991–1994	Garfield and Friends	Additional voices	Joined the cast in season 4
1993	Droopy, Master Detective	Rumpley's Dad	"A Chip off the old Block Head"
1998	A Winnie the Pooh Thanksgiving	Tigger	TV special
1999	A Valentine for You	Tigger	TV special

=== Video games ===
Year	Title	Role
1998	My Interactive Pooh	Tigger

=== Radio ===
Year	Title	Role	Notes
1938	Major Bowes Amateur Hour	Himself	1 episode

=== Theme parks ===
Year	Title	Role
1999	The Many Adventures of Winnie the Pooh	Tigger (Walt Disney World version)
