= Charlie McCarthy =

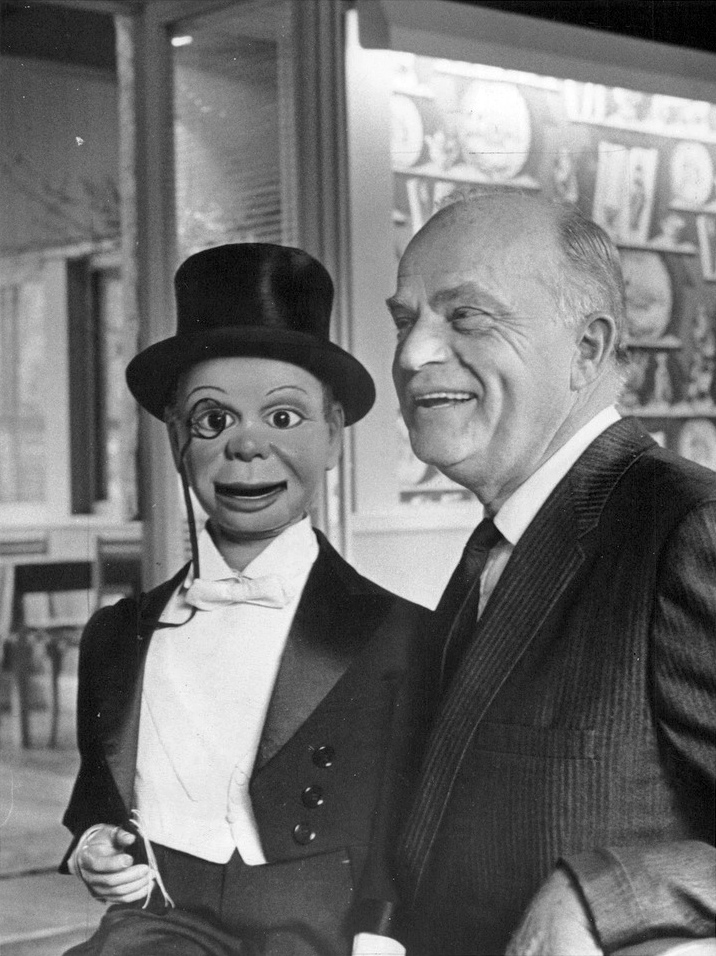
- Charlie (left) with Bergen
- First appearance: The Goldwyn Follies
- Last appearance: The Muppet Movie
- Created by: Edgar Bergen; Theodore Mack; Frank Marshall
- Voiced by: Edgar Bergen (1930–1978)

In-universe information
- Species: Human ventriloquist mannequin
- Gender: Male
- Occupation: Stand-up comedian
- Home: Smithsonian Institution (After Bergen's Death)
- Nationality: American

Charlie McCarthy was a dummy partner of American ventriloquist Edgar Bergen. Charlie was part of Bergen's act as early as high school, and by 1930 was attired in a top hat, tailcoat and monocle. The character was so well known that his popularity exceeded that of his performer, Bergen.

== History ==
Charlie's personality was that of a mischievous little boy, who could wisecrack, misbehave and flirt shamelessly in a way that Bergen could not. Bergen's original dummy was built by carpenter/dummy-maker Theodore Mack, and was later rebuilt by Frank Marshall. A 1938 magazine article reported that “When Edgar Bergen was a high school student in Chicago in the post-war [WWI] period, he got the notion that he wanted a dummy so that he could become a ventriloquist. He came to Mr. [Charlie] Mack’s workshop who assigned [Frank] Marshall to the problem. Bergen wanted a fresh Irish kid, resembling a newsboy that he knew, and the present Charlie McCarthy was made and sold to Bergen for $35 in 1923. However, it was not until 1933 that Charlie and Bergen breezed into Broadway and were an instantaneous hit which was climaxed by their appearance on the radio.”

Charlie and Bergen made their radio debut on NBC's The Royal Gelatin Hour in 1936, where they proved such a hit that the following year the network gave them a starring role on The Chase and Sanborn Hour. There they were initially supported by emcee Don Ameche, singer Nelson Eddy, actress Dorothy Lamour and comedian W. C. Fields. The following year Charlie was joined by a much dumber dummy, "Mortimer Snerd".

By 1939, Charlie was commanding 35.7% of the audience share and was referenced by Barbara Stanwyck in 1945's hit comedy Christmas in Connecticut.

Though shortened to thirty minutes as The Chase and Sanborn Program, it wasn't until 1947, in a case of star taking precedent over sponsor in the title, that the series was officially renamed The Charlie McCarthy Show. After a year's hiatus while the duo toured onstage, 1949 brought a switch to CBS and change of sponsors to Coca-Cola. In 1955, Charlie and Bergen entered their last format, with the ventriloquist taking top billing for once, in The New Edgar Bergen Hour, which ran until 1956.

During this lengthy tenure, Charlie's guest roster included Henry Fonda, the Andrews Sisters, Rosemary Clooney, Roy Rogers, Frank Sinatra, Carol Channing, Groucho Marx, Dinah Shore, Liberace, Bergen's wife Frances Bergen, and in occasional appearances, Charlie's "sister" Candice Bergen. Bergen and McCarthy also co-starred with Mickey Mouse in the 1947 Disney film Fun and Fancy Free. McCarthy also had a cameo in the 1938 Disney cartoon Mother Goose Goes Hollywood, tormenting W.C. Fields, who appeared as Humpty Dumpty.

In 1977, Charlie appeared with Bergen and Mortimer Snerd on Episode 207 of The Muppet Show. Fozzie's dummy "Chuckie" is based on Charlie.

Bergen and McCarthy made their final film appearance in The Muppet Movie, as guest judges of the Bogen County Fair beauty contest. Bergen died in 1978 shortly after filming this sequence, and the film is dedicated to his memory. One of the original Charlie dummies is now part of the permanent collection of the Smithsonian Institution National Museum of American History.

== Orson Welles ==
Charlie and Bergen were programmed opposite The Mercury Theatre on the Air on CBS, a program helmed by Orson Welles. On October 30, 1938, many listeners fiddled with the dial during Nelson Eddy's musical interlude, intending to switch back for Charlie's next comedy spot, and stumbled on Welles' production of The War of the Worlds, allegedly engendering a panic. As later reported, noted critic and wit Alexander Woollcott sent the young Welles a telegram on the subject: "This only goes to prove, my beamish boy, that the intelligent people were all listening to the dummy, and that all the dummies were listening to you." By 1944, Welles had become a recurring guest, with the dummy puncturing the pomposity of the genius.

== Filmography ==
- 1938: The Goldwyn Follies
- 1938: Letter of Introduction
- 1939: You Can't Cheat an Honest Man with Mortimer Snerd
- 1939: Charlie McCarthy, Detective
- 1941: Look Who's Laughing
- 1942: Here We Go Again with Mortimer Snerd
- 1943: Stage Door Canteen
- 1944: Song of the Open Road
- 1947: Fun and Fancy Free with Mortimer Snerd
- 1950: Charlie's Haunt
- 1970: The Phynx
- 1979: The Muppet Movie
- 2009: I'm No Dummy (archival footage)
