= Farfel the Dog =

Ventriloquist puppet and advertising icon

- First appearance: 1950
- Last appearance: 1992
- Created by: Jimmy Nelson
- Performed by: Jimmy Nelson

In-universe information
- Species: Dog
- Gender: Male

Farfel the Dog is a hound dog ventriloquist's dummy created by Jimmy Nelson. The Farfel character is best known for television commercials for Nestlé's Quik which ran from 1953 to 1965. An original talking Farfel can be seen at the Chocolate Experience Museum, located in Burlington, Wisconsin.

== Creation ==
In 1950, while working a late show in a Wichita, Kansas nightclub with his human dummy Danny O'Day, ventriloquist Jimmy Nelson picked up a stuffed dog left by a patron on the piano, and improvised a low-pitched voice to make it talk. This gave him the idea for a new character which he commissioned from Chicago dummy maker Frank Marshall. Nelson named it Farfel, after the Jewish pasta dish he had seen on the menu of resorts in the Borscht Belt on his tour route. Farfel was an instant hit, and contributed to the rise in Nelson's popularity as he began to transition from live performance touring to television. Farfel would frequently say: "No, I wouldn't say that", based on the Great Gildersleeve character Peavey the Druggist's drawled catchphrase "Well now I wouldn't say that."

== Nestlé commercials ==
Beginning in 1955, Farfel sang the last word of the Nestlé jingle, after the first two lines were sung by Nelson's human dummy Danny O'Day:

Danny: "N-E-S-T-L-E-S, Nestlé's makes the very best...
Farfel: Choc'-late

At the end, Farfel's mouth would close with a distinctive clap, uncharacteristic of proper ventriloquist's technique. The sound was the result of Nelson's nervousness at his audition for the Nestlé executives; his hands sweated, resulting in his finger slipping off of the mouth control. The executives liked the effect so much, they insisted that Nelson keep it in. The commercials ran for 10 years from 1955 to 1965. Farfel made a brief comeback in the mid-1990s for a Nestlé's candy Christmas promo, with a send-in offer for a stuffed Farfel doll.

== In popular culture ==
Archie Bleyer of Cadence Records originally wanted Nelson to appear on the Everly Brothers' 1959 recording of "Bird Dog" and use the voice of Farfel on the choruses, but that idea fell through.

In the WKRP in Cincinnati episode "The Consultant", Bailey Quarters sings the Nestle's jingle, and places her hands together to imitate Farfel when singing the last word. She then says to the consultant, "Farfel. Remember that guy? The dog."

In an episode of Seinfeld, entitled "The Dog", Farfel was also the name of the dog that Jerry ends up "dogsitting" after the dog's owner suffers a heart attack while sitting next to Jerry on an airplane.

In the Curb Your Enthusiasm episode “The Terrorist Attack”, Larry David sings the Nestle's jingle whilst apologizing and ends his song with the distinctive clap.
