= List of The New Adventures of Winnie the Pooh episodes =

This is a complete list of episodes of Disney's The New Adventures of Winnie the Pooh. The series premiered on January 17, 1988 on Disney Channel. Thirteen episodes were aired on the network before the series moved to ABC that fall.

== Series overview ==
Season	Episodes	Originally released	
Season	Episodes	First released	Last released
1	22	January 17, 1988	March 11, 1989
2	10	September 9, 1989	December 2, 1989
3	10	September 8, 1990	November 10, 1990
4	8	September 7, 1991	October 26, 1991

== Episodes ==
=== Season 1 (1988–1989) ===
The early half of the season was animated by TMS with the exception of “The Wishing Bear”, which was animated by Walt Disney Animation Australia. Walt Disney Animation Australia later took over animation production of the series, starting with “Fish Out of Water”.

No. overall	No. in season	Title	Written by	Original release date
1	1	"Pooh Oughta Be in Pictures"	Bruce Talkington and Mark Zaslove	January 17, 1988
The pilot episode. As a reward for Christopher Robin eating all his vegetables, he along with Pooh, Piglet, and Tigger go to the theater to watch Birdzilla, a scary monster movie. During the film, Piglet gets scared and thinks the movie is real and the monster will get him. The gang tries to convince him that it is only make-believe and proceed to make their own monster film to prove it.
2a	2a	"Friend, In Deed"	Story by : Mark Zaslove; Teleplay by : Jymn Magon	January 24, 1988
Pooh has been borrowing too much honey from Rabbit lately. This makes Rabbit mad to the point where he says that Pooh is "eating him out of house and honey". Desperate, Pooh and his friends try to retrieve honey from a beehive, so Rabbit will not have to move away. Nevertheless, this proves to be a daunting task.
2b	2b	"Donkey for a Day"	Story by : Mark Zaslove and Dev Ross; Teleplay by : Bruce Talkington and Mark Zaslove	January 24, 1988
Piglet, feeling sorry for Eeyore, who always seems to be depressed, convinces the others to spend a whole day trying to cheer him up. However, their attempts repeatedly get Eeyore into trouble. It turns out that Eeyore isn't as sad as everyone thought.
3a	3a	"There's No Camp Like Home"	Story by : Mark Zaslove; Teleplay by : Dev Ross	January 31, 1988
When the gang goes camping, Piglet is frightened by Tigger's stories and comes up against one of his greatest fears: Heffalumps.
3b	3b	"Balloonatics"	Story by : Mark Zaslove; Teleplay by : Bruce Reid Schaefer	January 31, 1988
Pooh borrows a balloon from Christopher Robin and the gang all panics when Piglet causes it to become deflated.
4	4	"Find Her, Keep Her"	Story by : Mark Zaslove; Teleplay by : Doug Hutchinson, Larry Bernard and Mark Zaslove	February 7, 1988
Rabbit rescues a little bird named Kessie and finds himself in the role of parent. His overly-protective tendencies cause trouble when Kessie begins to feel an urge to fly, which Rabbit expressly forbids for fear of losing her.
5	5	"The Piglet Who Would Be King"	Story by : Mark Zaslove and Mark Cassutt; Teleplay by : Bruce Talkington, Bruce Reid Schaefer and Jymn Magon	February 14, 1988
Piglet sets out with Tigger and Rabbit to the Land of Milk and Honey, hoping to get some honey for Pooh as a gift after Piglet gets an unexpected gift from Pooh. They discover a tiny race of Piglet lookalikes called "Piglies" who proclaim Piglet as their king, which causes him internal conflict – especially when Tigger and Rabbit (whom Piglet appoints as his Prime Minister and Chamberlain, respectively) abuse the Piglies' hospitality.
6	6	"Cleanliness is Next to Impossible"	Story by : Mark Zaslove; Teleplay by : Dev Ross, Bruce Talkington and Mark Zaslove	February 21, 1988
Tigger encourages Christopher Robin to clean his messy room by throwing everything he owns under the bed. This proves troublesome when the gang discovers that the evil Crud (voiced by Jim Cummings) and his sneezing minion, Smudge (also voiced by Cummings), occupy a land beneath the mattress and plan to spread messiness everywhere.
7	7	"The Great Honey Pot Robbery"	Story by : Bruce Talkington and Mark Zaslove; Teleplay by : Bruce Talkington	February 28, 1988
All the honey in the Hundred-Acre Wood has disappeared and it appears to be the work of a Heffalump and a Woozle named Heff (voiced by Chuck McCann) and Stan (voiced by Ken Sansom). When the gang successfully recovers the honey, Stan decides to get backup in the form of a giant Woozle named Wooster--but Pooh's offer of friendship provides a surprising resolution to the conflict.
8a	8a	"Stripes"	Story by : Terrie Collins and Mark Zaslove; Teleplay by : Terrie Collins, Bruce Reid Schaefer and Mark Zaslove	March 6, 1988
When Rabbit forces Tigger to have a bath, the bounce-happy tiger's stripes come off. The gang believes that this "new" creature isn't Tigger, as all Tiggers have stripes, prompting an identity crisis in the sad tiger. Eventually, Eeyore solves the problem by pointing out that it is Tigger's heart, not his stripes, that make him who he truly is.
8b	8b	"Monkey See, Monkey Do Better"	Story by : Mark Zaslove; Teleplay by : Terrie Collins with Bruce Reid Schaefer	March 6, 1988
The gang meets a wind-up monkey toy named Bruno, who claims to be the "best toy a kid could get," in Christopher Robin's closet. Bruno boasts that he is better than all of Christopher's old toys, making them fear that they will be replaced.
9	9	"Babysitter Blues"	Story by : Mark Zaslove and Richard Merwin; Teleplay by : Bruce Reid Schaefer and Bruce Talkington	March 13, 1988
Christopher Robin and the gang get into mischief while a babysitter tries to look after them. Later, on a snow day, Kanga hires Christopher Robin to babysit Roo while she goes out for the day.
10	10	"How Much is That Rabbit in the Window"	Story by : Mark Zaslove; Teleplay by : Dev Ross	March 20, 1988
After a calendar mishap leads Rabbit to believe that his birthday has been forgotten, he decides to run away from the Hundred-Acre-Wood, only to found by a secondhand shop owner who puts him up for sale. While the gang tries to find Rabbit, the bunny himself must fend off some thuggish toys who are out to make trouble.
11a	11a	"Gone With The Wind"	Story by : Terrie Collins and Mark Zaslove; Teleplay by : Terrie Collins and Bruce Talkington	March 27, 1988
After being buffeted about by the wind, Piglet becomes afraid of going outside.
11b	11b	"Nothing But The Tooth"	Bruce Talkington	March 27, 1988
Pooh believes he can no longer enjoy honey when he loses his "sweet tooth," which has been stolen by pack rats.
12	12	"Paw and Order"	Story by : Len Uhley and Mark Zaslove; Teleplay by : Len Uhley	April 3, 1988
Pooh and the gang pretend to be in the Wild West during a play.
13a	13a	"Honey for a Bunny"	Story by : Paula Sigman and Jymn Magon; Teleplay by : Paula Sigman	April 10, 1988
When Rabbit throws away a lone bunny-shaped bookend, it finds its way all around the gang.
13b	13b	"Trap as Trap Can"	Story by : Mark Zaslove and Bruce Talkington; Teleplay by : Bruce Talkington	April 10, 1988
Pooh and Piglet help a young heffalump named Junior, who is having difficulty learning trapping from his father.
14a	14a	"The Masked Offender"	Story by : Mark Zaslove; Teleplay by : Carter Crocker	November 12, 1988
Tigger takes on the identity of "The Masked Offender" in order to help people, but causes more trouble than he fixes.
14b	14b	"Things That Go Piglet in the Night"	Story by : Mark Zaslove; Teleplay by : Bruce Talkington	November 19, 1988
The gang is in a state of panic because they think they are being haunted by a ghost which was just Piglet running scared silly and Eeyore trying to swing. (Note: This episode marks the first time Jim Cummings voiced Tigger, albeit just for a single line)
15a	15a	"Luck Amok"	Story by : Mark Zaslove, Jymn Magon; Teleplay by : Carter Crocker	December 3, 1988
When Tigger breaks a mirror Rabbit was using, Rabbit believes he has bad luck, and so do the others, but it turns out Tigger has the bad luck.
15b	15b	"Magic Earmuffs"	Story by : Terrie Collins and Mark Zaslove; Teleplay by : Carter Crocker	December 3, 1988
Christopher Robin gives Piglet "magic earmuffs" to help give him build confidence in his ice skating. After losing the earmuffs, Piglet has a crisis of belief, only to discover his own skill when he must save the gang from the perils of an icy river. The episode was a bonus on the video release of "Winnie the Pooh and Christmas Too".
16	16	"The Wishing Bear"	Mark Zaslove and Dev Ross (story), Mark Zaslove and Bruce Talkington	December 10, 1988
When Christopher Robin shows Pooh a wishing star, Pooh tells Piglet, Tigger and Rabbit about it, and they all wish for something. But, when Pooh thinks he wished out the wishing star, and that the others' wishes will not come true, he tries his best to fulfill them all.
17a	17a	"King of the Beasties"	Story by : Mark Zaslove; Teleplay by : Carter Crocker	January 7, 1989
Tigger thinks his great uncle is a lion and declares himself, "King of the Beasties" with chaotic results. (Note: This episode marks the first full appearance of Jim Cummings voicing Tigger)
17b	17b	"The Rats Who Came to Dinner"	Story by : Mark Zaslove; Teleplay by : Bruce Talkington	January 7, 1989
Pooh and the gang try to deal with the pack rats during a flood.
18a	18a	"My Hero"	Story by : Mark Zaslove and Stephen Sustarsic; Teleplay by : Stephen Sustarsic and Bruce Talkington	January 14, 1989
Piglet saves Tigger's life, and Tigger becomes Piglet's servant.
18b	18b	"Owl Feathers"	Story by : Mark Zaslove; Teleplay by : Stephen Sustarsic	January 14, 1989
When the gang finds a pile of feathers on the trail, they believe that they belonged to Owl and that he has gone bald.
19a	19a	"A Very, Very Large Animal"	Story by : Mark Zaslove; Teleplay by : Carter Crocker	January 21, 1989
Piglet thinks he is too small and moves away from the Hundred Acre Wood.
19b	19b	"Fish Out of Water"	Story by : Mark Zaslove; Teleplay by : Carter Crocker	January 28, 1989
Rabbit is at his wit's end when Gopher is forced to move in with him.
20a	20a	"Tigger's Shoes"	Story by : Marley Clark, Jymn Magon and Mark Zaslove; Teleplay by : Jymn Magon	February 4, 1989
Rabbit gives Tigger weighted shoes and challenges him to jump the highest rock in the wood to keep him out of the way.
20b	20b	"Lights Out"	Story by : David Silverman and Stephen Sustarsic; Teleplay by : Stephen Sustarsic and Mark Zaslove	February 11, 1989
When Rabbit takes Gopher's flashlight without asking, Gopher panics and he and the rest of the gang go in search of it.
21a	21a	"The "New" Eeyore"	Story by : Mark Zaslove; Teleplay by : Stephen Sustarsic	February 25, 1989
Eeyore dresses up like Tigger in order to become more popular.
21b	21b	"Tigger, Private Ear"	Story by : Terrie Collins and Mark Zaslove; Teleplay by : Carter Crocker and Mark Zaslove	February 18, 1989
When Owl reads a thrilling mystery novel to the gang, Tigger inadvertently helps him find his lost glasses, prompting the bird to declare Tigger a detective. The bouncy tiger likes the idea, but resorts to committing crimes in secret to give himself cases to solve, which leads to attack of conscience when Piglet is accused of stealing honey.
22a	22a	"Party Poohper"	Story by : Mark Zaslove; Teleplay by : Carter Crocker	March 4, 1989
Rabbit wants to plan a party for his five hundred visiting bunny relatives, and becomes obsessed with using a schedule to keep Pooh, Piglet, and Tigger on track. But when his excessive scheduling ends up driving everyone away by accident, he realizes that his desire for order has kept his family and friends from having fun.
22b	22b	"The Old Switcheroo"	Rich Fogel (teleplay)	March 11, 1989
Roo asks Tigger to keep him from having a bath, and the tiger recruits Piglet to switch places with Roo to trick Kanga. But when Roo and Tigger get excessively dirty, and Kanga pretends that she does not recognize Piglet, everyone realizes that their attempted "switcheroo" has gone too far. (Note: This was one of the few episodes to be directly based on a chapter from one of A. A. Milne's Pooh books, namely Winnie-The-Pooh.)

=== Season 2 (1989) ===
Walt Disney Animation Australia animated most of the episodes of Season 2, with the exception of “To Catch a Hiccup”, which was animated by Walt Disney Animation Japan.

No. overall	No. in season	Title	Written by	Original release date
23a	1a	"Me and My Shadow"	Story by : Mark Zaslove; Teleplay by : Stephen Sustarsic	September 23, 1989
Piglet finds a shadow, and takes it home. His friends get somewhat jealous. That night the shadow leaves and Piglet goes to find him.
23b	1b	"To Catch a Hiccup"	Story by : Rich Fogel, Jymn Magon and Mark Zaslove; Teleplay by : Stephen Sustarsic	September 30, 1989
Piglet gets hiccups, so the gang helps Piglet to cure his hiccups
24a	2a	"Rabbit Marks the Spot"	Story by : Mark Zaslove and Bruce Talkington; Teleplay by : Carter Crocker	September 9, 1989
Sick of his friends ruining his garden while they are playing pirate, Rabbit gives them a fake treasure map "drawn from his great-great-great uncle and the greastest rabbit pirate ever, Long John Cottontail" that leads them to a chest full of rocks. When he becomes worried that his friends will hate him for deceiving them, he tries to get the chest back before they open it.
24b	2b	"Good-bye, Mr. Pooh"	Story by : Mark Zaslove and Stephen Sustarsic; Teleplay by : Stephen Sustarsic	September 23, 1989
Misinterpreting Pooh’s words of going to the dump, Tigger spreads a rumor that Pooh is leaving the Hundred Acre Wood, everyone throws Pooh a good-bye party. Pooh then leaves and stays for a second, but when he gets home, he finds Eeyore living at his home.
25a	3a	"Bubble Trouble"	Story by : Lynn Feinermann and Mark Zaslove; Teleplay by : Carter Crocker	September 9, 1989
Pooh gets stuck in a bubble, Gopher's hole blows away in a storm, and Rabbit hosts a vegetable meeting.
25b	3b	"Groundpiglet Day"	Story by : Jimmy Danelli and Mark Zaslove; Teleplay by : Carter Crocker	September 30, 1989
It is Groundhog Day but there is no groundhog, so Rabbit makes Piglet the groundhog and he changes the holiday.
26	4	"All's Well That Ends Wishing Well"	Marley Clark, Stephen Sustarsic, Carter Crocker, Karl Geurs and Mark Zaslove	September 16, 1989
When the gang discovers that Tigger has never had a birthday, they decide to throw him a party that fails to impress him, especially when he does not get what he wants. A trip to the Hundred-Acre-Wood's wishing well leads Tigger to "Wishland," where everything he desires comes true. Eventually, though, he must choose between all of the possessions he has gained and his friends.
27	5	"Un-Valentine's Day"	Story by : Jymn Magon and Mark Zaslove; Teleplay by : Carter Crocker, Stephen Sustarsic and Mark Zaslove	October 7, 1989
Rabbit makes a law that there will be no more Valentine's Day after everyone has received countless valentines in previous years.
28a	6a	"No Rabbit's a Fortress"	Story by : Stephen Sustarsic and Mark Zaslove; Teleplay by : Stephen Sustarsic, Bruce Talkington and Mark Zaslove	October 14, 1989
Rabbit builds a fortress to prevent anyone from trampling into his garden only to realize that he has forgotten to put a door, thus trapping himself inside.
28b	6b	"The Monster Frankenpooh"	Story by : Carter Crocker and Mark Zaslove; Teleplay by : Carter Crocker	October 14, 1989
It is a dark and stormy night in the Hundred Acre Wood and Tigger spins a tale of the mad scientist Piglet and his monster Frankenpooh.
29a	7a	"Where Oh Where Has My Piglet Gone?"	Story by : Mark Zaslove; Teleplay by : Carter Crocker	October 21, 1989
Pooh thinks he has misplaced Piglet and tries to find him until he found him practicing to sing.
29b	7b	"Up, Up and Awry"	Story by : Bruce Talkington and Mark Zaslove; Teleplay by : Carter Crocker	October 21, 1989
When Pooh tries to fly, the gang think that he is 'breaking the law' (of Gravity), so Pooh stays in his house all locked up.
30a	8a	"Eeyore's Tail Tale"	Story by : Evelyn A-R Gabai, Bruce Talkington and Mark Zaslove; Teleplay by : Evelyn A-R Gabai and Bruce Talkington	October 28, 1989
Eeyore becomes sick of his tail, so he abandons it. But Eeyore decides he wants it back, and Detective Tigger helps him. But the others find it and claim it as an object of their own.
30b	8b	"Three Little Piglets"	Story by : Carter Crocker and Mark Zaslove; Teleplay by : Carter Crocker	October 28, 1989
Pooh tells the story of the three little pigs, Hundred Acre Wood style.
31a	9a	"Prize Piglet"	Story by : Bruce Talkington; Teleplay by : Carter Crocker	November 18, 1989
Piglet and his friends run a race for a running trophy.
31b	9b	"Fast Friends"	Story by : Bruce Talkington; Teleplay by : Carter Crocker	November 18, 1989
Piglet is stuck in the treehouse until he jumps off. Gopher tries to make Pooh faster so he won't be late as often.
32a	10a	"Pooh Moon"	Evelyn A-R Gabai and Bruce Talkington (story and teleplay)	December 2, 1989
After Tigger tells the gang a scary story about "the Grab Me-Cotcha", they are alarmed to find that Pooh and Piglet are finding the honeymoon and comes home. Note: This episode has a new bomb falling sound with only one pitch featuring Pooh's first time screaming.
32b	10b	"Caws and Effect"	Story by : Bruce Talkington and Ken Kessel; Teleplay by : Carter Crocker	December 2, 1989
Piglet, Tigger and Rabbit go on a hunt to capture crows and leaves Pooh to watch Rabbit's garden. Unbeknownst to them the whole thing is a setup just to leave the garden under the protection of the "nitwit" Pooh.

=== Season 3 (1990) ===
Walt Disney Animation Australia animated nearly all of the episodes of Season 3, with the exception of “April Pooh” which was animated by Walt Disney Animation UK Limited.

No. overall	No. in season	Title	Written by	Original release date
33a	1a	"Oh, Bottle"	Story by : Bruce Talkington; Teleplay by : Carter Crocker	September 8, 1990
When Pooh and Christopher Robin are playing pirates, Christopher Robin makes up a treasure map, and puts it in a bottle. He gives it to Pooh, but it gets stolen by the pack rats, so Pooh and the gang try to get it back to Christopher Robin.
33b	1b	"Owl in the Family"	Story by : Ken Kessel, Carter Crocker and Bruce Talkington; Teleplay by : Carter Crocker and Bruce Talkington	September 8, 1990
Owl wants to see his family, so Pooh and Piglet organise a family reunion for him. But does Rabbit think they're true?
34a	2a	"Sham Pooh"	Story by : Eric Lewald, Ken Kessel and Bruce Talkington; Teleplay by : Eric Lewald	September 15, 1990
When Pooh loses his appetite, the others think he's not Winnie the Pooh, and then everybody thinks neither one of them are themselves. So, Detective Pooh and Tigger go look for Pooh's appetite.
34b	2b	"Rock-a-Bye Pooh Bear"	Evelyn A-R Gabai and Bruce Talkington	September 15, 1990
Piglet has a bad dream about losing his friends in the storm and becomes afraid to go to sleep. All of his friends except him blow away. Will Piglet ever have a good dream?
35a	3a	"What's the Score, Pooh?"	Sindy McKay, Larry Swerdlove and Bruce Talkington (story and teleplay)	September 22, 1990
A game gets out of hand when Pooh accidentally touches Gopher's Big Boulder exhibition.
35b	3b	"Tigger's Houseguest"	Story by : Carter Crocker; Teleplay by : Carter Crocker and Bruce Talkington	September 22, 1990
Tigger befriends a termite which had been eating all the wooden things in the Hundred Acre Wood. And Rabbit tells Tigger to get rid of the termite.
36a	4a	"Rabbit Takes a Holiday"	Cliff Roberts and Carter Crocker	September 29, 1990
Rabbit has no more work to do around his house and garden, so he leaves Pooh and the others to watch over. But while Rabbit is gone, Pooh and the others create utter chaos in his house and garden.
36b	4b	"Eeyi Eeyi Eeyore"	Story by : Bruce Talkington and Carter Crocker; Teleplay by : Carter Crocker and Bruce Talkington	September 29, 1990
Eeyore agrees to help Rabbit plant a seed near Eeyore's house. But Eeyore thinks that his seed will not grow, so Pooh and Tigger disguise Piglet as a flower and leave him near Eeyore's house overnight. When Rabbit thinks Eeyore is a better gardener than him because of the disguised Piglet, Rabbit gives up his property to Eeyore and lives in Eeyore's house. However, Eeyore is an inexperienced gardener and soon messes up Rabbit's garden.
37	5	"Pooh Skies"	Carter Crocker and Michele Rifkin	October 6, 1990
When Pooh knocks an eggshell out of tree, the gang becomes convinced that the sky is falling.
38a	6a	"To Bee or Not to Bee"	Carter Crocker	October 13, 1990
Christopher Robin and the gang are playing 'war' in their bedroom. His mother tells him to tidy up, so Pooh and his friends explain why they are playing 'war'.
38b	6b	"April Pooh"	Eric Lewald	October 13, 1990
Pooh and his friends look for the April Fool, not aware that it is Christopher Robin playing jokes on them.
39	7	"A Knight to Remember"	Bruce Talkington and Carter Crocker	October 20, 1990
On a stormy night, Piglet enters a world where he is a brave Knight.
40a	8a	"Tigger is the Mother of Invention"	Carter Crocker and Evelyn A-R Gabai	October 27, 1990
Tigger's disastrous inventions bother his friends.
40b	8b	"The Bug Stops Here"	Eric Lewald and Bruce Talkington	October 27, 1990
Pooh is babysitting Owl's nephew, Dexter, and Roo. They and the rest of the gang are invited to Christopher Robin's house so they could see his science project, which is an insect. But the gang accidentally lets the bug loose and soon agree that they will find a replacement bug for Christopher Robin.
41a	9a	"Easy Come, Easy Gopher"	Evelyn A-R Gabai and Bruce Talkington	November 3, 1990
Rabbit becomes annoyed when Gopher starts digging his 'Ultimate Tunnel' around his house, so he re-writes the equation when Pooh accidentally messed it up, but that makes things worse.
41b	9b	"Invasion of the Pooh Snatcher"	Mirith Schilder, Elen Orson and Bruce Talkington	November 3, 1990
When Tigger tells Piglet that Jagulars are roaming the wood, Piglet tells Pooh to help him protect his house, and Tigger thinks that Pooh has been snatched by a Jagular, and vice versa.
42a	10a	"Tigger Got Your Tongue?"	Eric Lewald and Bruce Talkington	November 10, 1990
Tigger loses his voice, and Pooh and the gang try to find the 'Nobody' that took it. Meanwhile, Gopher tries to get rid of the crows bothering him, and Rabbit tries to find his vegetables.
42b	10b	"A Bird in the Hand"	Bruce Talkington and Carter Crocker	November 10, 1990
When an adult Kessie returns to the Hundred-Acre Wood, Rabbit still treats her like a fledgling. When Kessie tries to prove that she is an adult, she runs away, but gets kidnapped by Stan and Heff, who demand honey for her release.

=== Season 4 (1991) ===
This season was animated both by Wang Animation and Hanho Heung-Up.

No. overall	No. in season	Title	Written by	Original release date
43	1	"Sorry, Wrong Slusher"	Stephen Sustarsic	September 7, 1991
Strange things happen when Christopher Robin and the gang watch a late night "Slusher" film.
44	2	"Grown, But Not Forgotten"	Terrie Collins, Stephen Sustarsic and Carter Crocker	September 14, 1991
When Christopher Robin has to attend a "grown up" girl's party, Pooh and the gang become afraid he, too, will grow up and will forget them. Pooh and the other animals decide that they must learn to behave like grown-ups too.
45	3	"A Pooh Day Afternoon"	Jymn Magon (story), Terrie Collins	September 21, 1991
Christopher Robin, Pooh and the gang have to look after a dog.
46	4	"The Good, the Bad, and the Tigger"	Stephen Sustarsic	September 28, 1991
When Tigger loses control of Christopher Robin's toy train, he and Pooh are put on trial as train robbers.
47	5	"Home Is Where the Home Is"	Bruce Reid Schaefer	October 5, 1991
After Christopher Robin and the gang accidentally break a statue of his great-grandfather while cleaning up, Christopher runs away from home, with the gang offering their homes for him. When it turns out that he can not live in any of their houses, Pooh and the gang build him a home.
48a	6a	"Shovel, Shovel, Toil and Trouble"	Libby Hinson	October 12, 1991
When Gopher receives a large shovel, he goes overboard "improving" everyone's home.
48b	6b	"The Wise Have It"	Julia Jane Lewald	October 12, 1991
When the gang throw a birthday party for Pooh, they become convinced he is old and wise when they see how many candles there are on his cake. When they all ask Pooh for advice, things go awry.
49a	7a	"Cloud, Cloud Go Away"	Terrie Collins	October 19, 1991
When Tigger was about to bounce over a tree, a cloud is blocking his view and Tigger insults it while throwing a rock at it. As a result, the cloud starts raining on Tigger wherever he goes.
49b	7b	"To Dream the Impossible Scheme"	Dev Ross	October 19, 1991
Gopher's Grandpappy comes for a visit, prompting Gopher to try to accomplish his Grandpappy's life-long dream of building an above-ground underground city.
50a	8a	"Piglet's Poohetry"	Stephen Sustarsic	October 26, 1991
Tigger causes trouble when he intrudes on Piglet's poetry.
50b	8b	"Owl's Well That Ends Well"	Julia Jane Lewald	October 26, 1991
Owl's poor singing upsets Rabbit, but scares off the crows.

== Additional specials ==
No.	Title	Directed by	Written by	Original release date
1	"Winnie the Pooh and Christmas Too"	Jamie Mitchell	Karl Geurs and Mark Zaslove	December 14, 1991
2	"Boo to You Too! Winnie the Pooh"	Rob LaDuca	Carter Crocker	October 25, 1996
3	"A Winnie the Pooh Thanksgiving"	Jun Falkenstein	Carter Crocker	November 26, 1998
4	"Winnie the Pooh: A Valentine for You"	Keith Ingham	Carter Crocker	February 13, 1999
5	"Winnie the Pooh: Seasons of Giving"	Harry Arends, Jun Falkenstein, and Karl Geurs	Barbara Slade	November 9, 1999 (Direct-to-video)
6	"Winnie the Pooh: A Very Merry Pooh Year"	Jamie Mitchell, Gary Katona, Ed Wexler, and Ken Kessel	Karl Geurs, Ted Henning, Mark Zaslove, and Brian Hohlfeld	November 12, 2002 (Direct-to-video)

== See also ==
- Winnie-the-Pooh
- List of Winnie-the-Pooh characters
- The New Adventures of Winnie the Pooh
