= Zaslove =

Zaslove is a surname. Notable people with the surname include:

- Alan Zaslove (1927–2019), American animator, producer, and director
- Mark Zaslove (born 1959), American writer, director, producer, and novelist
