= The Legend of Calamity Jane =

Television series

- Genre: Animation; Action; Adventure; Western
- Written by: Mark Zaslove
- Directed by: Pascal Morelli
- Starring: Barbara Scaff; Frank Welker; Clancy Brown; Michael Horse; Tim Matheson
- Composer: La Belle Equipe
- Countries of origin: France; United States
- No. of episodes: 13

Production
- Executive producers: Michel P. Pinard; Jean-Paul Gaspari
- Producer: Thierry Rivard
- Running time: 22–23 minutes
- Production companies: Itel; Gangster Production; Contre Allée

Original release
- Network: Canal+ (France); The WB (Kids' WB) (United States)
- Release: September 13, 1997 – June 26, 1998

The Legend of Calamity Jane is a 1997–98 animated television series. The series followed the adventures of a fictionalized Calamity Jane in Deadwood, South Dakota. The episode "I'd Rather Be in Philadelphia" takes place during the opening of the Centennial Exposition, establishing the timeline setting in 1876. The series had "fuller and richer animation than was customary on Saturday-morning TV."

It aired in France and Canada from 1997–98, in Portugal in 2002, and in the United Kingdom via the POP TV channel from 2003–04. Despite its short run, the series developed a cult following.

== Series run ==
In the United States, three episodes were aired on The WB in 1997. The network gave the series heavy promotion, but they quietly pulled it from their line-up after only three weeks. It was stated on Warner Bros.' website that the show would return later in the year, and that Superman: The Animated Series would be filling in for its timeslot, but this proved to be untrue. The series did run complete in Latin America on HBO and several European countries, and was dubbed into languages like French, Spanish, Portuguese, Italian, Swedish and Serbian.

== Production ==
Jennifer Jason Leigh was originally cast as the voice of Calamity Jane. However, two weeks before the show was to premiere, the producers decided to re-cast the role. Barbara Scaff got the part. None of the dialogue recorded by Leigh was used in the final show. However, due to the short notice, the promotional ads aired on the WB used the lines by Leigh.

== Main characters ==
- Calamity Jane (voiced by Barbara Scaff) – Although based on the historical frontierswoman, her appearance and background are fictionalized. For example, in the series, she is literate and claims to have grown up in Portsmouth, Rhode Island and Atlanta, Georgia while the real Martha Jane Canary was illiterate and raised in Missouri. She also claims to be a member of the Comanche tribe. Depicted as 24 years old, with green eyes, pale skin and red hair, she fights on the side of "law and order". Jane prefers to use a whip and drink milk. She rides a black horse named Dakota.
- Joe Presto (voiced by Frank Welker) – He serves as a helpful sidekick to Jane and shows great care and concern for her throughout the series. He prefers not to kill, as evidenced by his shotgun only being loaded with rock salt. He rides a mule named Tessy.
- Wild Bill Hickok (voiced by Clancy Brown) – Based on the real Wild Bill Hickok, he is depicted as an old friend of Jane's who helps her on several occasions despite his reservations toward the law.
- Quanna Parker (voiced by Michael Horse) – Jane's "blood brother" and Chief of the Comanche tribe with a fondness for existential philosophy. In "Troubled Waters", his tribe become millionaires after discovering oil on their land.
- Captain John O'Rourke (voiced by Tim Matheson) – A polite, law-abiding cavalry officer who assists Jane throughout the series and is hinted to have romantic feelings for her. In "The Final Curtain", it is revealed he witnessed the assassination of Abraham Lincoln as a child and felt responsible because his older brother, a Secret Service agent, chose to sit by him instead.

== Episodes ==
No.	Title	Directed by	Written by	Original release date
1	"Slip of the Whip"	Pascal Morelli	Mark Zaslove	September 13, 1997
The Comanche and the army are pitted against each other by Bill Doolin, an outlaw who plans to rob a train.
2	"An Army of Rogues"	Pascal Morelli	S : Mark Zaslove; S/T : Jeremy Cushner	September 20, 1997
A mad Napoleon wannabe sets out to conquer the United States using armaments stolen from a cavalry fort.
3	"Like Father, Like Daughter"	Pascal Morelli	Mark Zaslove	September 27, 1997
A man claiming to be Jane's father turns up at the same time a series of bank robberies occur.
4	"As Easy as One, Two, Three..."	Pascal Morelli	S : Ken Pontac, David Bleiman; S/T : Jeremy Cushner	March 24, 1998
Jane deals with triplet bandits.
5	"Train Kept a' Rollin'"	Pascal Morelli	S : Mark Zaslove; S/T : Jeremy Cushner	April 7, 1998
Bill Doolin escapes from custody and hijacks a military train full of TNT.
6	"The Final Curtain"	Pascal Morelli	Michael Patrick Dobkins	April 14, 1998
O'Rourke is convinced that a travelling actor named Jeremiah Wilkinson is really John Wilkes Booth.
7	"The Way of the Buffalo"	Pascal Morelli	Mark Zaslove	April 17, 1998
Jane and the Buffalo Soldiers try to break up a feud between a racist settler and the Blackfoot.
8	"Troubled Waters"	Pascal Morelli	S : Mark Zaslove; T : Ken Pontac & David Bleiman	April 21, 1998
A corrupt bureaucrat attempts to force the Comanche off of their oil-rich land.
9	"Waiting for the Cavalry"	Pascal Morelli	Mark Zaslove	May 29, 1998
Jane, Joe and Wild Bill are cornered in a desolate shack by desperadoes.
10	"Dead, or Alive"	Pascal Morelli	S : Mark Zaslove; T : Jeremy Cushner	June 5, 1998
Jane fends off bounty hunters while transporting John Wesley Hardin to face trial.
11	"Protege"	Pascal Morelli	S : Mark Zaslove; T : Ken Pontiac and David Bleiman	June 12, 1998
Jane is shadowed by an overly enthusiastic girl named Ellie.
12	"I'd Rather Be in Philadelphia"	Pascal Morelli	Mark Zaslove, Ken Pontac & David Bleiman	June 19, 1998
Neo-Confederates plot to assassinate President Grant.
13	"Without a Vengeance"	Pascal Morelli	Mark Zaslove	June 26, 1998
When Jane is beaten and left for dead by an outlaw, Wild Bill is overcome with lust for revenge.

== Home media ==
On October 3, 2022, the Texas-based companies Piko Interactive and Comix.tv (now known as What A Toon!) launched a Kickstarter campaign to fund a special DVD box set and special edition comic to celebrate the series' 25th anniversary in 2022. The company previously did a Kickstarter campaign for a DVD release of Stone Protectors in 2021 which was successful. It would be the first time the remaining episodes were released in the United States. This campaign was successfully funded with $24,284 on 426 backers. Discotek Media released the series on Blu-ray on September 28, 2023.

The series is currently available on Tubi as of March 31, 2023, but has since been removed.
