= BROK the InvestiGator =

2022 video game

- Developer: COWCAT Games
- Publisher: COWCAT Games (Note: The PS5 version was published by Eastasiasoft for Hong Kong and Taiwan.)
- Producer: Fabrice Breton
- Designer: Fabrice Breton
- Programmer: Fabrice Breton
- Artists: Danilo do B (cover art); Kresblain; GlassesGator; Monika Rider
- Writers: Fabrice Breton; Jymn Magon
- Composer: Python Blue
- Engine: GameMaker Studio 2
- Platforms: Windows; Linux; macOS; Nintendo Switch; PlayStation 4; PlayStation 5; Xbox One; Android; iOS
- Release: Windows; August 26, 2022; Linux, macOS; October 4, 2022; Switch, PS4, PS5, Xbox One; March 1, 2023; Android, iOS; February 21, 2024
- Genres: Point-and-click adventure, beat 'em up
- Modes: Single-player, multiplayer

BROK the InvestiGator is a point-and-click beat 'em up indie game developed and self-published by independent French game studio COWCAT Games using GameMaker Studio 2. The game was successfully crowdfunded through Kickstarter.

The game was released worldwide on August 26, 2022, for Microsoft Windows via Steam, followed by Linux and macOS ports on October 4. Home console versions for Nintendo Switch, PlayStation 4, PlayStation 5 and Xbox One, were released on March 1, 2023.

Android and iOS mobile ports of the game was released on February 21, 2024. The game is free to download with only the first chapter playable, with the option to buy further chapters. A free-to-play spin-off visual novel game, titled BROK - Natal Tail, A New Christmas, was released on Steam on December 13, 2024. Unlike the base game, the Christmas-themed spin-off doesn't have any voiceovers for the characters. Home console ports followed on December 1, 2025.

== Gameplay ==
BROK the InvestiGator plays like a traditional classic point-and-click adventure game, while also combining elements from action side-scrolling beat 'em up and role-playing games, with the look and feel of a 1980s–early 1990s Saturday-morning cartoon. Players control the titular character Brok as well as Graff, where they can be switched at anytime during gameplay. The entire game is also voice-acted from start to finish with more than 23,000 lines of spoken dialogue.

Upon first starting the game, players learn how to use items as well as understanding how to switch between the two gameplay modes, such as Adventure Mode and Action Mode. Players must go around places talking to other non-playable characters, finding and combining clues, investigating scenarios around the environment and solve puzzles by either using thinking skills or by using their action wits. While exploring around, players can either move around and examine or search for things around them in Adventure Mode. They must also interrogate suspects with the clues and hints found and put them together and ask questions and find culprits (inspired by Ace Attorney and Sam & Max). When playing in Action Mode, players can jump and attack enemies or objects like in beat em' up games (like Final Fight or Streets of Rage 2). They must also be in Action Mode in order to bypass traps and avoid hazards by either jumping or running fast. When enemies and bosses come around, players will then be switched into the Action Mode phrase and they must then battle against them (the fight scenes can be skipped if the game is being played on easy mode). When they are defeated, players earn experience points. When enough is earned, they level up their strength like in role-playing games and they can choose one of three stats to upgrade such as either their health points, their attack power, or upgrade special attacks to take less time to cool down after use. Players also have access to an inventory where weapons and items can be used in combat, for puzzle-solving or for supportive aid.

== Plot ==
The game's premise takes place in a fictional country, known as Atlasia, that is set in a futuristic "light cyberpunk" era where anthropomorphic animals have replaced humans, but now refer to themselves as humans. Privileged citizens live under a dome protected from ambient pollution while all the other citizens suffer to make ends meet.

The main focus of the game is the titular character, Brok, a 35-year-old private detective alligator who is also a former championship boxer. He lives in a basement apartment with a cat named Graff, who is the 16-year-old teenage stepson of Brok's deceased wife Lia. As much as Brok could not exactly clarify her accident, events that have happened recently might reveal more information on a much more tragic result, and it might even be connected towards their existence. Brok and Graff now have to get out and endure against all the horrible danger that the corrupted world has created and must be willing to deal with their fates.

== Development ==
The game has started development in 2016 and has been in the process for about six years to create, with wrap-up in 2022. Previous working titles for the game were Tough BROK and BROK the Brawler Detective. The final title was settled on BROK the InvestiGator, as a play on the words "alligator" and "investigator", given what the titular character is. A few years later, further into development, an official Kickstarter page was launched on January 5, 2021, to provide the funding needed for the game's completion. The game was quickly successfully crowdfunded as Breton reached his main pledge goal towards a minimum of €12,000 ($14,287 in 2021) in just 17 hours. Additional "stretch goals", such as better and smoother animations as well as additional and optional boss battles, an official theme song for the game, an official comic book based on the game, multiple contextual game over screens, a developer commentary and even couch co-op multiplayer, were also reached. By the end of the Kickstarter funding campaign on February 5, 2021, the final results came with a funding of 346%, backed by 1,060 supporters with €41,588 ($49,515 in 2021) total, reaching more than triple its original main goal.

The game has been advertised as the first of a hybrid between a point and click adventure game and a side-scrolling beat 'em up with role-playing game elements (specifically, as a "Punch n' Click" game). The game's art style was inspired by western animation from the 1980s and early 1990s, generally from The Disney Afternoon, of which its cartoons were very popular throughout the 1990s. In addition, the script for the first part of the game was edited by Disney pioneer Jymn Magon, an American television and film writer who served as co-creator/writer for DuckTales, Adventures of the Gummi Bears, TaleSpin and A Goofy Movie.

With game development mainly being done in France, the game however was written, scripted and voice-acted entirely in English with more than 23,000 lines of dialogue provided. Afterwards, Breton himself has then translated all the game text and dialogue into French. The game would be available in a total of ten languages overall on launch day. In addition to English and French, the game would also be officially localized and translated into Japanese, Castilian Spanish, German, Italian, Brazilian Portuguese, Russian, Polish and Simplified Chinese. In November 2022, an eleventh language option which is Traditional Chinese was also added, as Eastasiasoft handled publication of a PlayStation 5 release of the game for the Taiwan/Hong Kong markets. However, the voice acting would still only be in English regardless, as the audio dialogue will be displayed through translated subtitle text towards all non-English language options. Due to budget and time constraints, there are currently no plans to dub the game in other languages.

The prologue demo contains the first chapter of the game, whereas the finalized release of the full game is six chapters long as it takes between 15 and 20 hours for the average player to finish a single playthrough. The game also contains multiple endings; depending on the choices players make during their adventure, different relations with characters or events can occur. There are also unlockable extras that are included in the game, such as concept art as well as artwork drawn by fans worldwide that have made the cut to be featured. Players can spend extra points to unlock the fan art. There was also a contest held for the game where lucky winners received prizes.

On October 13, 2021, the game had to be delayed to 2022. On August 9, 2022, a new trailer was announced for the game's worldwide scheduled release date of August 26, on Microsoft Windows via Steam; ports for Linux and macOS was published on October 4. Versions for Nintendo Switch, PlayStation 4, PlayStation 5, Xbox One and Xbox Series X/S, were published on March 1, 2023. A mobile port for Android and iOS was released on February 21, 2024, with a first chapter for free; the rest is behind a paywall.

On November 25, 2022, Version 1.2.1 of this game has added new features such as new enemy moves, the ability for players to do longer combo attacks, and a new difficulty setting (Mania mode, which is unlockable after beating the game on Hardcore mode).

On March 9, 2023, the game added numerous accessibility features for blind gamers, such as additional narration via text-to-speech audio descriptions on characters, locations and scenes, and skippable puzzles/fights. In October the same year, local co-op mode was added with six playable characters to choose from and up to 4 players can experience the story.

On June 4, 2024, COWCAT Games announced downloadable content in the form of The Brawl Bar, a boxing-themed add-on for the base game that is "80% action and 20% visual novel/adventure". The DLC was released on August 13, 2025, on Steam, which was followed by home console ports on December 2 for Nintendo Switch, PlayStation 4, PlayStation 5, Xbox One and Xbox Series X/S. It is a $10 paid DLC add-on on Steam, and a stand-alone separate spin-off title from the base game on home consoles at same price ($10).

== Reception ==
=== Pre-release ===
The game's prologue demo has received very positive feedback with critics and fans on Steam, where the score holds a 9/10. The idea of combining a point-and-click adventure game with side-scrolling beat' em up with RPG elements was taken as a uniquely new concept and players have invoiced positive feedback in regards to its writing, character animations, gameplay and an overall enjoyable experience that holds a very high promise. The game's art style which appeals towards 1990s nostalgia also won praise with fans who grew up in that era.

=== Critical reception ===
Reception

Aggregate score
Aggregator	Score
Metacritic	(PC) 79/100 (XBO) 78/100

Review scores
Publication	Score
Adventure Gamers	4.5/5
Destructoid	7/10
Nintendo Life	7/10

BROK the InvestiGator received "generally favorable" reviews from critics, according to review aggregator platform Metacritic.

Adventure Gamers gave a rating of 4.5 stars out of 5, praising the cartoon art, characters, voice acting, and world-building, but criticizing the simple combat mechanics and stiff animations. Destructoid gave a rating of 7 out of 10, saying, "Solid and definitely have an audience. There could be some hard-to-ignore faults, but the experience is fun." Nintendo Life gave a rating of 7 out of 10 and called it an original game but criticized the slow start.

Within a week after the game's worldwide release, Fabrice Breton himself announced that this game received international success with a 99% rating on Steam. The total sales for BROK the InvestiGator matched nearly close to the total revenue that Breton's first game "Demetrios" received throughout years of its release, after the first week release of BROK.
