= All Dogs Go to Heaven =

1989 animated film directed by Don Bluth

- American theatrical release poster
- Directed by: Don Bluth
- Screenplay by: David N. Weiss
- Story by: Don Bluth; Ken Cromar; Gary Goldman; Larry Leker; Linda Miller; Monica Parker; John Pomeroy; Guy Schulman; David J. Steinberg; David N. Weiss
- Produced by: Don Bluth; Gary Goldman; John Pomeroy
- Starring: Loni Anderson; Judith Barsi; Dom DeLuise; Melba Moore; Charles Nelson Reilly; Burt Reynolds; Vic Tayback
- Edited by: John K. Carr
- Music by: Ralph Burns
- Production companies: Goldcrest Films; Sullivan Bluth Studios Ireland Limited
- Distributed by: United Artists (through MGM/UA Communications Co.; United States); Rank Film Distributors (United Kingdom and Ireland)
- Release dates: 17 November 1989 (United States); 8 February 1990 (United Kingdom); 6 April 1990 (Ireland)
- Running time: 85 minutes
- Countries: Ireland; United Kingdom; United States
- Language: English
- Budget: $13 million
- Box office: $27.1 million

All Dogs Go to Heaven is a 1989 animated musical fantasy comedy drama film directed by Don Bluth. It stars the voices of Loni Anderson, Judith Barsi (in her final film role), Dom DeLuise, Melba Moore, Charles Nelson Reilly, Burt Reynolds, and Vic Tayback. Set in New Orleans in 1939, it tells the story of Charlie B. Barkin, a German Shepherd mix who is murdered by his former friend, Carface Carruthers. Charlie escapes from Heaven to return to Earth, where his best friend, Itchy Itchiford, still lives, to take revenge on Carface. Instead, he befriends a young orphan girl named Anne-Marie. In the process, Charlie learns an important lesson about kindness, friendship, and love.

All Dogs Go to Heaven was theatrically released by MGM/UA Communications Co. on 17 November 1989 in the United States, and by Rank Film Distributors on 8 February 1990 in the United Kingdom, and on 6 April 1990 in Ireland. It received mixed reviews from critics and was moderately successful, grossing $27.1 million on a $13 million budget. It was more successful on home video, becoming one of the highest-selling VHS releases ever. It was followed by a theatrical sequel, a television series, and a holiday direct-to-video film. It is the last animated film to be theatrically released by United Artists until Missing Link (2019).

== Plot ==
In 1939 New Orleans, Charlie B. Barkin escapes from the dog pound with the help of his best friend Itchy Itchiford and returns to their casino riverboat on the bayou. His business partner, Carface Caruthers is surprised to see Charlie alive and is reluctant to share the profits with him. Carface had secretly been responsible for Charlie getting committed to the pound due to greed and decides to get rid of him for good this time by killing him with a car pushed downhill. Despite not having done any good lifetime deeds Charlie is automatically sent to Heaven. He is then greeted by Annabelle who explains to him that because dogs are inherently good and loyal, all dogs go to Heaven and are entitled to paradise. Taking advantage of her kindness, Charlie cheats death by stealing a pocket watch representing his life and winding it back. As Charlie descends back to Earth, the whippet angel tells him that he can never return to Heaven.

When Charlie returns he reunites with Itchy and plots revenge in the form of a rivaling business. They soon discover that Carface's success has been from a kidnapped young orphan girl named Anne-Marie for her ability to talk to animals, which proves helpful when betting on races. While Charlie rescues her and promises to feed the poor and help her find a family, he takes her to a race track the following day to gamble. Charlie steals a wallet from a couple as they talk to Anne-Marie and become concerned by her rough appearance. Charlie and Itchy use their winnings to build a successful casino in the junkyard where they live. Anne-Marie threatens to leave when she realizes she has been used, but Charlie persuade her to stay by bringing pizza to a family of poor puppies and their mother (Flo) at an abandoned church. Although initially a success, Anne-Marie becomes angry at Charlie when she discovers the stolen wallet.

As Charlie has a nightmare in which he is condemned to Hell, Anne-Marie returns the wallet to the couple who introduce themselves as Kate and Harold. As they privately discuss adopting her Charlie arrives and tricks her into leaving with him. Charlie and Anne-Marie narrowly escape an ambush by Carface and his assistant Killer and hide in an abandoned building, but the ground breaks and they fall into the lair of a giant alligator named King Gator. He and Charlie bond over a love of music and he lets them go, but Anne-Marie catches pneumonia in the process. Carface and his thugs destroy Charlie's casino and assault Itchy. Feeling abandoned, Itchy limps back to the church to confront Charlie about his relationship with Anne-Marie. Charlie retorts in exasperation that he is using her and will eventually "dump her in an orphanage". A heartbroken Anne-Marie overhears the conversation and tearfully runs away before she is kidnapped by Carface. Charlie follows them to Carface's casino, where he is ambushed by his thugs. As they fight with Charlie they inadvertently start an oil fire that soon engulfs the whole structure. Charlie's pained howls from their bites summon King Gator, who chases down and devours Carface.

During the chaos both Anne-Marie and the watch fall into the water, but Charlie is unable to rescue both at the same time. He then decides to choose Anne-Marie by placing her onto some driftwood and pushing her toward safety, but Charlie's life ends as the watch stops before he can retrieve it. As Killer finishes pushing her to shore Kate and Harold are waiting with police and medical personnel, alongside Itchy, Flo, and the other dogs from New Orleans. Sometime later, Kate and Harold adopt Anne-Marie, who has also adopted Itchy. Charlie, having sacrificed himself to save Anne-Marie, has earned back his place in Heaven, and is allowed to return in ghost form to reconcile with Anne-Marie. Leaving Itchy in her care, Charlie returns to Heaven, where, in a mid-credits scene, Carface finally arrives and takes his own watch, vowing revenge against King Gator. As Annabelle chases him and warns against using it, Charlie assures the audience that "he'll be back".

== Voice cast ==
- Burt Reynolds as Charlie B. Barkin, a brash German Shepherd and a former con artist.
- Dom DeLuise as Itchy Itchiford, a paranoid, anxious but loyal Dachshund and Charlie's best friend.
- Judith Barsi (Lana Beeson, singing voice) as Anne-Marie, a 7-year-old orphan girl with the ability to talk to and understand animals. This was Barsi's final film role before her murder in 1988; the end credits song "Love Survives" was dedicated in her memory.
- Vic Tayback as Carface Carruthers, a violent, sadistic Bulldog gangster.
- Charles Nelson Reilly as Killer, a misnamed, fidgety, neurotic and spectacles-wearing Schnoodle who is Carface's comic relief sidekick.
- Loni Anderson as Flo, a female Rough Collie and one of Charlie's friends.
- Melba Moore as Annabelle, a Whippet angel who welcomes deceased dogs into Heaven.
- Ken Page as King Gator, an American alligator and voodoo witch doctor living below the streets of New Orleans.
- Rob Fuller and Earleen Carey as Kate and Harold, a kindly married couple who later become Anne-Marie's adoptive parents.
- Godfrey Quigley as Terrier, a dog that appears when Itchy tells everyone Anne-Marie is in danger.
- Anna Manahan as Stella Dallas, a horse that appears when Anne-Marie, Charlie and Itchy are at the derby.
- Candy Devine as Vera, a female gambling dog.
- Dan Molina (uncredited) as the hellhound in Charlie's nightmare and at the finale.

== Production ==
The earliest idea was conceived by Don Bluth after finishing work on The Secret of NIMH. The treatment was originally about a canine private eye, and one of three short stories, making up an anthology film. The character of a shaggy German Shepherd was designed specifically for Burt Reynolds. Don Bluth Productions, however, was going through a period of financial difficulty, ultimately having to declare bankruptcy, and the idea never made it beyond rough storyboards. The concept was revived by Bluth, John Pomeroy and Gary Goldman, and rewritten by David N. Weiss, collaborating with the producers from October through December 1987. They built around the title All Dogs Go to Heaven and drew inspiration from films, such as It's a Wonderful Life, Little Miss Marker and A Guy Named Joe. The film's title came from a book read to Bluth's fourth-grade class, and he resisted suggestions to change it, stating he liked how "provocative" it sounded, and how people reacted to the title alone.

During the production of their previous feature film, Sullivan Bluth Studios had moved from Van Nuys, California, to a state-of-the-art studio facility in Dublin, Ireland, and the film was their first to begin production wholly at the Irish studio. It was also their first film to be funded from sources outside of Hollywood, as the previous two feature films, An American Tail and The Land Before Time, had been backed by Amblin Entertainment and Universal Pictures, and executive producers Steven Spielberg and George Lucas (for The Land Before Time only) exercised a degree of control over the content of the films, a situation that Bluth found disagreeable. The studio found investment from UK-based Goldcrest Films in a US$70m deal to produce three animated feature films (though only two, Rock-a-Doodle and it, were completed under the deal). The three founding members of the studio, Bluth, Pomeroy, and Goldman, had all moved to Ireland to set up the new facility, but during the film's production, John Pomeroy returned to the United States to head up a satellite studio which provided some of the animation for the film. Pomeroy also used his presence in the United States to generate early publicity for the film, including a presentation at the 1987 San Diego Comic-Con.

The film's lead voices, Burt Reynolds and Dom DeLuise, had previously appeared together in five films. For this one, they requested them to record their parts in the studio together (in American animation, actors more commonly record their parts solo). Bluth agreed and allowed the duo to ad-lib extensively; Bluth later commented that "their ad-libs were often better than the original script", but Reynolds was more complimentary of the draft, warmly quipping, "Great script, kid", as he left the studio. Another pair of voices, those of Carface and Killer (Vic Tayback and Charles Nelson Reilly, respectively), also recorded together. Loni Anderson, who voices Flo, was Reynolds' then-wife. Child actress Judith Barsi, who voiced Ducky in Bluth's previous film The Land Before Time, was selected to voice Anne-Marie; she was killed in an apparent murder-suicide over a year before All Dogs was released. Bluth recalled that the animation team were too upset to work on scenes involving Anne-Marie for two weeks after Barsi's death, as animating required them to listen to cassette recordings they had of her voice. In the 2000s, an erroneous rumor emerged on the internet claiming that Reynolds broke down crying while recording his final scene involving Barsi's character due to her death, despite evidence that Reynolds would have finished recording dialogue before Barsi's death. Bluth later denied the rumor on his X account.

As production neared completion, the studio held test screenings and decided that some scenes were too intense for younger viewers. Pomeroy decided to shorten Charlie's nightmare about being condemned. Goldman also agreed to the cut, recognizing that the concession needed to be made in the name of commercial appeal. Bluth owned a private 35-mm print with the excised scenes and planned to convince Goldcrest on releasing a director's cut after returning from Ireland in the mid-1990s, but the print was eventually stolen from Bluth's locked storage room, diminishing hopes of this version being released on home media.

== Music ==
All Dogs Go to Heaven Original Motion Picture Soundtrack

Soundtrack album by various artists
- Released: 1 July 1989
- Genre: Soundtrack
- Length: 33:18
- Label: Curb
- Producer: Ralph Burns

Don Bluth film's music chronology
| The Land Before Time (1988) | All Dogs Go to Heaven (1989) | Rock-a-Doodle (1992) |

The music for All Dogs Go to Heaven was composed by Ralph Burns with songs by Charles Strouse, T.J. Kuenster, Joel Hirschhorn, and Al Kasha. An official soundtrack was released on 1 July 1989, by Curb Records on audio cassette and CD featuring 13 tracks, including seven vocal songs performed by various cast members. The track "Let Me Be Surprised" contains a swear word in a dialogue cut from the final product. "Love Survives", the end credits song and overall theme, was dedicated to Anne-Marie's voice actress Judith Barsi, who was shot by her father, József, along with her mother, Maria, before the film's release on 25 July 1988.

Professional ratings
Review scores
| Source | Rating |
|---|---|
| AllMusic | 4/5 stars |

=== Songs ===
Original songs performed in the film include:

Songs on the All Dogs Go to Heaven soundtrack
| No. | Title | Writer(s) | Performer(s) | Length |
|---|---|---|---|---|
| 1. | "You Can't Keep a Good Dog Down" | Charles Strouse | Burt Reynolds & Dom DeLuise |
| 2. | "Let Me Be Surprised" | Charles Strouse | Melba Moore & Burt Reynolds |
| 3. | "What's Mine is Yours" | Charles Strouse | Burt Reynolds & Chorus |
| 4. | "Soon You'll Come Home" | T.J. Kuenster | Lana Beeson |
| 5. | "Let's Make Music Together" | Charles Strouse | Ken Page & Burt Reynolds |
| 6. | "Hallelujah" | T.J. Kuenster | Candy Devine |
| 7. | "Love Survives" | Al Kasha, Joel Hirschhorn & Michael Lloyd | Irene Cara & Freddie Jackson |

== Reception and legacy ==
=== Critical response ===
On the review aggregator website Rotten Tomatoes, 46% of 28 critics' reviews are positive, with an average rating of 5.5/10. Metacritic, which uses a weighted average, assigned the film a score of 50 out of 100, based on 8 critics, indicating "mixed or average" reviews.

Reviewers often drew unfavorable comparisons to The Little Mermaid, criticizing the disjointed narrative, the quality of the animation, and the songs by Charlie Strouse and T.J. Kuenster. The film received a "thumbs down" from Gene Siskel and a "thumbs up" from Roger Ebert on a 1989 episode of their television program At the Movies. While Siskel found it to be "surprisingly weak" given director Don Bluth's previous works, largely due to its "confusing story" and "needlessly violent" scenes, Ebert was a huge fan of the film's "rubbery and kind of flexible" animation, stating that it was a good film despite not being an "animated classic".

Some also found the darker subject material objectionable in a family film, given the film's depictions of death, violence, theft, drinking, smoking, gambling, murder, demons, and images of Hell. Other reviews were mostly positive, with critics praising the film's emotional qualities, humor, and vibrant color palette. Roger Ebert, who was unimpressed with Bluth's previous film An American Tail, gave it three out of four stars, remarking that the animation "permits such a voluptuous use of color that the movie is an invigorating bath for the eyes" and that although he preferred The Little Mermaid, which opened on the same day, he still found All Dogs Go to Heaven to be bright and inventive. In contrast, film critic Leonard Maltin gave it one-and-a-half out of four stars, due to "unappealing characters, confusing storytelling, and forgettable songs." Common Sense Media was concerned about the depictions of illegal drug usage and excessive dark thematic elements in a family oriented film.

=== Box office ===
Dissatisfied with the terms imposed by Universal Pictures, which had distributed their previous two films, the studio found an alternative distributor in United Artists. Somewhat unusually, production investors Goldcrest Films covered the cost of the release prints and the promotional campaign, in return for a greatly reduced distribution fee from UA. This was similar to the arrangement with United Artists when they distributed Bluth's first feature film, The Secret of NIMH. Goldcrest Films invested $15 million in print and promotion. Due to contractual issues, very little tie-in merchandise accompanied the film's theatrical release; a computer game adaptation for the Commodore Amiga system (with a free software package) was released, and restaurant chain Wendy's offered toys with their Kids' Meals or regular fries.

The film opened in North America on 17 November 1989, concurrent with Disney's 28th full-length animated motion picture The Little Mermaid; once again, Sullivan Bluth would be vying for box-office receipts with Disney, just as their last two films (An American Tail and The Land Before Time) had. On its theatrical release, the film was only moderately successful as its performance fell short of the studio's previous box-office successes, grossing $27 million in North America alone, just over half of what An American Tail and The Land Before Time each took.

This would be Bluth's final box office hit until Anastasia was released eight years later in 1997, which ended up becoming his highest-grossing film.

== Awards and honors ==
All Dogs Go to Heaven received a nomination for "Best Family Motion Picture: Adventure or Cartoon" at the 11th Annual Youth in Film Awards ceremony, being beaten by Disney's The Little Mermaid. The home video release received an Award of Excellence from the Film Advisory Board. All Dogs Go to Heaven was nominated for Best Family Motion Picture: Adventure or Cartoon at the Youth in Film Awards.

== Home media ==
All Dogs Go to Heaven was released on VHS, S-VHS, 8mm video and LaserDisc in both regular and special CAV standard play editions by MGM/UA Home Video on August 28, 1990. The film became a sleeper hit due to its home video release; a strong promotional campaign helped it become one of the top-selling VHS releases of all time, selling over 3 million copies in its first month. The film was followed by another VHS release under the MGM/UA Family Entertainment label in 1994, which was available exclusively through Warner Home Video.

A DVD was made available for the first time on March 6, 2001, under the MGM Kids label and was later released as a double feature with All Dogs Go to Heaven 2 on March 14, 2006. The film made its debut on Blu-ray on March 29, 2011, and was later included as a bundle with its sequel on October 7, 2014, along with a re-release of the compilation on DVD. The Blu-ray version was also packaged with another Don Bluth film, The Pebble and the Penguin, on October 8, 2013, and again with eight other MGM films as part of the company's 90th anniversary "Best of Family Collection" on 4 February 2014.

A video game based on the film, also titled All Dogs Go To Heaven, was released in 1989 for MS-DOS and in 1990 for Amiga. The game has ten mini-games loosely tied together to form a story mode, with three difficulty levels. The game's minigames include rat racing, watch catching, horizontal ball and paddle, maze navigating, shape stacking, maze running, hangman, jigsaw puzzle, street navigating, and dog fighting. An activity center game based on the film, titled All Dogs Go To Heaven Activity Center, was released for Windows PC in 1997.

== Sequels and television series ==
The success of the film, particularly its performance on home video, prompted several follow-up productions. A theatrical sequel, All Dogs Go to Heaven 2 (1996), a television series, All Dogs Go to Heaven: The Series (1996–1998), and An All Dogs Christmas Carol (1998), a Christmas television film based on Charles Dickens' A Christmas Carol, were made. Bluth and his studio had no involvement with any of them, and Reynolds did not reprise his role as Charlie after the first film; he was replaced in the sequel film and television series by Charlie Sheen and Steven Weber, respectively. Reilly declined to return for the sequel film, but voiced Killer for the television productions. DeLuise played Itchy through the entire franchise.

== See also ==
- List of films about angels
