= 1989–90 United States network television schedule (daytime) =

The following is the 1989–90 daytime network television schedule for the three major English-language commercial broadcast networks in the United States. It covers the weekday and weekend daytime hours from September 1989 to August 1990.

== Legend ==
- Light yellow indicates talk shows.
- Green indicates soap operas.
- Pink indicates game shows.
- Gold indicates news and public affairs programming.
- Light teal indicates sporting events.
- White indicates local programming.
- Light purple indicates children's programming.
- Gray indicates encore programming (e.g., reruns of prime-time programming).
- New series are highlighted in **bold**.

== Schedule ==
- All times correspond to U.S. Eastern and Pacific Time scheduling (except for some live sports or events). Except where affiliates slot certain programs outside their network-dictated timeslots, subtract one hour for Central, Mountain, Alaska, and Hawaii-Aleutian times.
- Local schedules may differ, as affiliates have the option to pre-empt or delay network programs. Such scheduling may be limited to preemptions caused by local or national breaking news or weather coverage (which may force stations to tape delay certain programs to later timeslots) and any major sports events scheduled to air in a weekday timeslot (mainly during major holidays). Stations may air shows at other times at their preference.

=== Monday–Friday ===
Network		6:00 am	6:30 am	7:00 am	7:30 am	8:00 am	8:30 am	9:00 am	9:30 am	10:00 am	10:30 am	11:00 am	11:30 am	noon	12:30 pm	1:00 pm	1:30 pm	2:00 pm	2:30 pm	3:00 pm	3:30 pm	4:00 pm	4:30 pm	5:00 pm	5:30 pm	6:00 pm	6:30 pm
ABC	Fall	ABC World News This Morning		Good Morning America				Local/syndicated programming				The Home Show		**Perfect Strangers**	Loving	All My Children		One Life to Live		General Hospital		Local/syndicated programming					ABC World News Tonight with Peter Jennings
ABC	Summer	ABC World News This Morning		Good Morning America				Local/syndicated programming				The Home Show		Match Game	Loving	All My Children		One Life to Live		General Hospital		Local/syndicated programming					ABC World News Tonight with Peter Jennings
CBS		CBS Morning News		CBS This Morning				Local/syndicated programming		Family Feud	Wheel of Fortune	The Price Is Right		Local/syndicated programming	The Young and the Restless		The Bold and the Beautiful	As the World Turns		Guiding Light		Local/syndicated programming					CBS Evening News with Dan Rather
NBC	Fall	NBC News at Sunrise		Today				Local/syndicated programming		Scrabble	Classic Concentration	The Golden Girls	**227**	Local/syndicated programming	Generations	Days of Our Lives		Another World		Santa Barbara		Local/syndicated programming					NBC Nightly News with Tom Brokaw
NBC	Spring	NBC News at Sunrise		Today				Local/syndicated programming		227	Classic Concentration	The Golden Girls	**The Marsha Warfield Show**	Local/syndicated programming	Generations	Days of Our Lives		Another World		Santa Barbara		Local/syndicated programming					NBC Nightly News with Tom Brokaw
NBC	Summer	NBC News at Sunrise		Today				Local/syndicated programming		**Let's Make a Deal**	Classic Concentration	The Golden Girls	**The Marsha Warfield Show**	Local/syndicated programming	Generations	Days of Our Lives		Another World		Santa Barbara		Local/syndicated programming					NBC Nightly News with Tom Brokaw

=== Saturday ===
Network		7:00 am	7:30 am	8:00 am	8:30 am	9:00 am	9:30 am	10:00 am	10:30 am	11:00 am	11:30 am	noon	12:30 pm	1:00 pm	1:30 pm	2:00 pm	2:30 pm	3:00 pm	3:30 pm	4:00 pm	4:30 pm	5:00 pm	5:30 pm	6:00 pm	6:30 pm
ABC	Fall	Local and/or syndicated programming		A Pup Named Scooby-Doo	Disney's Gummi Bears / Winnie the Pooh Hour		Slimer! and the Real Ghostbusters		**Beetlejuice**	The Bugs Bunny and Tweety Show		Animal Crack-Ups	ABC Weekend Special	College Football on ABC											
ABC	Winter	Local and/or syndicated programming		A Pup Named Scooby-Doo	Disney's Gummi Bears / Winnie the Pooh Hour		Slimer! and the Real Ghostbusters		**Beetlejuice**	The Bugs Bunny and Tweety Show		The Flintstone Kids (R)	ABC Weekend Special	ABC Sports and/or local programming										Local news	ABC World News Saturday
ABC	May	Local and/or syndicated programming		A Pup Named Scooby-Doo	Disney's Gummi Bears / Winnie the Pooh Hour		Slimer! and the Real Ghostbusters		**Beetlejuice**	The Bugs Bunny and Tweety Show		Animal Crack-Ups	ABC Weekend Special	ABC Sports and/or local programming										Local news	ABC World News Saturday
CBS	Fall	Local and/or syndicated programming		**Dink, the Little Dinosaur**	Jim Henson's Muppet Babies		Pee-wee's Playhouse	**The California Raisin Show**	Garfield and Friends		**Rude Dog and the Dweebs**	The Adventures of Raggedy Ann and Andy (R)	CBS Storybreak (R)	CBS Sports and/or local programming										Local news	CBS Evening News
CBS	Winter	Local and/or syndicated programming		**Dink, the Little Dinosaur**	The California Raisin Show	Jim Henson's Muppet Babies		Pee-wee's Playhouse	Garfield and Friends		**Rude Dog and the Dweebs**	The Adventures of Raggedy Ann and Andy (R)	CBS Storybreak (R)	CBS Sports and/or local programming										Local news	CBS Evening News
NBC	Fall	Local and/or syndicated programming		ALF Tales	**Camp Candy**	**Captain N: The Game Master**	**The Karate Kid**	The Smurfs		The Chipmunks	**Saved by the Bell**	ALF (R)	Kissyfur (R)	NBC Sports and/or local programming										Local news	NBC Nightly News
NBC	Spring	Local and/or syndicated programming		Kissyfur (R)	**Camp Candy**	**Captain N: The Game Master**	**The Karate Kid**	The Smurfs		The Chipmunks	**Saved by the Bell**	ALF Tales	ALF (R)	NBC Sports and/or local programming										Local news	NBC Nightly News

=== Sunday ===
Network		7:00 am	7:30 am	8:00 am	8:30 am	9:00 am	9:30 am	10:00 am	10:30 am	11:00 am	11:30 am	noon	12:30 pm	1:00 pm	1:30 pm	2:00 pm	2:30 pm	3:00 pm	3:30 pm	4:00 pm	4:30 pm	5:00 pm	5:30 pm	6:00 pm	6:30 pm
ABC		Local and/or syndicated programming							This Week with David Brinkley		ABC Sports and/or local programming													Local news	ABC World News Sunday
CBS	Fall	Local and/or syndicated programming				CBS News Sunday Morning			Face the Nation	Local and/or syndicated programming		The NFL Today	NFL on CBS and/or local programming												
CBS	Mid-winter	Local and/or syndicated programming				CBS News Sunday Morning			Face the Nation	Local and/or syndicated programming		CBS Sports and/or local programming												Local news	CBS Evening News
NBC	Fall	Local and/or syndicated programming		Sunday Today			Meet the Press	Local and/or syndicated programming				NFL Live!	NFL on NBC												
NBC	Mid-winter	Local and/or syndicated programming		Sunday Today			Meet the Press	Local and/or syndicated programming				NBC Sports and/or local programming												Local news	NBC Nightly News

== By network ==
=== ABC ===
**Returning series**

- ABC Weekend Special
- ABC World News This Morning
- ABC World News Tonight with Peter Jennings
- All My Children
- Animal Crack-Ups
- The Bugs Bunny and Tweety Show
- Adventures of the Gummi Bears (moved from NBC)
- The Flintstone Kids (reruns)
- General Hospital
- Good Morning America
- The Home Show
- Loving
- Match Game
- The New Adventures of Winnie the Pooh
- One Life to Live
- A Pup Named Scooby-Doo
- Slimer! and the Real Ghostbusters
- This Week with David Brinkley

**New series**

- **Beetlejuice**
- **Perfect Strangers** (reruns)

**Not returning from 1988 to 1989**

- Growing Pains (reruns)
- The New Adventures of Beany and Cecil
- Ryan's Hope

=== CBS ===
**Returning series**

- The Adventures of Raggedy Ann and Andy
- As the World Turns
- The Bold and the Beautiful
- CBS Evening News
- CBS Morning News
- CBS News Sunday Morning
- CBS Storybreak (reruns)
- CBS This Morning
- Face the Nation
- Family Feud
- Garfield and Friends
- Guiding Light
- Jim Henson's Muppet Babies
- Pee-wee's Playhouse
- The Price Is Right
- Wheel of Fortune
- The Young and the Restless

**New series**

- **The California Raisins Show**
- **Dink, the Little Dinosaur**
- **Rude Dog and the Dweebs**

**Not returning from 1988 to 1989**

- Card Sharks
- Flip!
- Hey Vern, It's Ernest!
- Mighty Mouse: The New Adventures
- Now You See It
- Superman
- Teen Wolf (reruns)

=== NBC ===
**Returning series**

- ALF (reruns)
- ALF Tales
- Another World
- The Chipmunks
- Classic Concentration (reruns)
- Days of Our Lives
- Generations
- The Golden Girls (reruns)
- Kissyfur
- Meet the Press
- NBC News at Sunrise
- NBC Nightly News
- Santa Barbara
- Scrabble
- The Smurfs
- Sunday Today
- Today

**New series**

- **227** (reruns)
- **Camp Candy**
- **Captain N: The Game Master**
- **The Karate Kid**
- **Let's Make a Deal**
- **The Marsha Warfield Show**
- **Saved by the Bell**

**Not returning from 1988 to 1989**

- 2 Hip 4 TV
- Disney's Adventures of the Gummi Bears (moved to ABC)
- The Completely Mental Misadventures of Ed Grimley
- Fat Albert and the Cosby Kids (reruns)
- The New Archies (reruns)
- Punky Brewster (reruns)
- Sale of the Century
- Super Password
- Wheel of Fortune (moved to CBS)
- Win, Lose or Draw

== See also ==
- 1989-90 United States network television schedule (prime-time)
- 1989-90 United States network television schedule (late night)

== Sources ==
- https://web.archive.org/web/20071015122215/http://curtalliaume.com/abc_day.html
- https://web.archive.org/web/20071015122235/http://curtalliaume.com/cbs_day.html
- https://web.archive.org/web/20071012211242/http://curtalliaume.com/nbc_day.html
