= An All Dogs Christmas Carol =

1998 animated film

- VHS cover
- Written by: Jymn Magon
- Directed by: Paul Sabella
- Starring: Ernest Borgnine; Steven Weber; Dom DeLuise; Sheena Easton; Charles Nelson Reilly; Bebe Neuwirth
- Music by: Mark Watters
- Country of origin: United States
- Original language: English

Production
- Producers: Paul Sabella; Jonathan Dern
- Running time: 73 minutes
- Production company: Metro-Goldwyn-Mayer Animation

Original release
- Release: November 17, 1998

An All Dogs Christmas Carol is a 1998 direct-to-video animated musical comedy drama television special based on the 1843 novella A Christmas Carol by Charles Dickens. The third and final installment in the All Dogs Go to Heaven film series, it also serves as the series finale to the animated series. Unlike the first two films, where the main characters are Charlie and Itchy, Carface is the focus of the story.

== Plot ==
A bunch of angel puppies ask the angelic whippet Annabelle to tell them a story. She begins to tell them about how Carface saved Christmas with a little guidance from Charlie and Itchy.

In a San Francisco alleyway, Charlie, Itchy and Sasha help their friends decorate for a Christmas party. Charlie and Itchy tend to the young puppies, primarily a little one named Timmy, who has a crippled leg. The dogs have a collection for an operation for Timmy. To disrupt the festivities, Carface and Killer arrive for debts, but as his is not yet due, Charlie refuses. Carface blows a mysterious dog whistle that hypnotizes everyone into giving up their bones. As they depart, Carface and Killer take the food, presents and money, including that for Timmy's operation for his crippled leg.

Charlie and Itchy's attempts to reclaim their goods fail but they discover Carface is working for Annabelle's treacherous cousin, Belladonna, who plots to use a massive dog whistle to hypnotize every dog in the city into stealing the masters' Christmas presents, causing them to be thrown out of their houses and abandoned by their owners, much in the same way Carface used to be when he was a puppy. Charlie plots to scare "the Dickens" out of him and asks Annabelle for some aid, resulting in them being transformed into characters from A Christmas Carol. Itchy becomes the Ghost of Christmas Past, Sasha the Ghost of Christmas Present, and Charlie the Ghost of Christmas Future.

They each visit Carface, and gradually learn how he turned into a notorious criminal. At Itchy's insistence, Carface reveals that he was a happy puppy but his owner blamed him for making a mess of Christmas decorations, which gets him thrown out. Sasha tells him that without his operation, Timmy will die, and Charlie then shows that because of his actions, Carface will cause his own death, and be condemned to Hell for eternity.

Carface, having seen himself in Timmy, hurries to stop the whistle. Betrayed, Belladonna flies into a frenzied rage and is about to kill Carface and Killer when she is frozen solid by a massive amount of snow caused by Annabelle. As it begins to snow, everyone celebrates, but Itchy laments the lack of presents. At that moment, Carface arrives on a sled pulled by Killer and returns everything, and gives more. Handing back Timmy's money box, it is full to the top. Carface turns to leave but Sasha invites him to stay. He respectfully declines, deciding to visit his mother, but wishes everyone a Merry Christmas.

== Cast ==
- Ernest Borgnine as Carface Caruthers, the pit bull/bulldog mix (Ebenezer Scrooge)
- Steven Weber as Charles "Charlie" B. Barkin, the German Shepherd, Sasha's husband / Ghost of Christmas Future.
- Dom DeLuise as Itchiford "Itchy Itchiford" Dachshund (the dachshund), Charlie's best friend / Ghost of Christmas Past.
- Sheena Easton as Sasha la Fleur Barkin (the Irish Setter), Charlie's wife / Ghost of Christmas Present.
- Charles Nelson Reilly as Killer the schnoodle, Carface's mistreated, neurotic henchdog. Reilly reprises his role from the original film.
- Bebe Neuwirth as Annabelle, a good-hearted whippet who welcomes dogs into Heaven / Belladonna, Annabelle's villainous cousin
- Beth Andersen as Martha, a young girl and Timmy's owner
- Taylor Emerson as Timmy, a puppy with a crippled leg and Martha's pet (Tiny Tim)

Additional voices by Carlos Alazraqui, Dee Bradley Baker, Jamie Cronin, Myles Jeffrey, Megan Malanga, Chris Marquette, Gail Matthius, Aria Noelle Curzon and Ashley Tisdale with singing voices provided by Beth Andersen, Amick Byram, Billy Bodine, Susan Boyd, Alvin Chea, Randy Crenshaw, Lorraine Feather, Edie Lehman, Laurie Shillinger, Carmen Twillie and Vanessa Vandergriff.

== Music ==
Four original songs by Mark Watters and Lorraine Feather are featured:

- "When We Hear a Christmas Carol" – Charlie, Sasha, Itchy and Ensemble
- "Puppyhood" – Carface and Ensemble
- "I Always Get Emotional at Christmas Time" – Killer, Belladonna and Carface (Reprise)
- "Clean Up Your Act" – Charlie and Heavenly Ensemble

== See also ==
- Adaptations of A Christmas Carol
- List of Christmas films
- List of films about angels
