= The New Adventures of Winnie the Pooh =

American animated children's television series

- Also known as: Winnie the Pooh
- Genre: Children's series Animated series Fantasy; Comedy; Slapstick; Edutainment
- Based on: Winnie-the-Pooh by A. A. Milne and E. H. Shepard
- Developed by: Mark Zaslove; Karl Geurs
- Voices of: Jim Cummings; John Fiedler; Peter Cullen; Paul Winchell; Patricia Parris; Nicholas Melody; Ken Sansom; Hal Smith; Michael Gough; Tim Hoskins
- Theme music composer: Steve Nelson
- Opening theme: "Pooh Bear (The New Adventures of Winnie the Pooh Theme Song)" sung by Steve Wood
- Ending theme: "The New Adventures of Winnie the Pooh"
- Composers: Steve Nelson; Thom Sharp
- Country of origin: United States
- Original language: English
- No. of seasons: 4
- No. of episodes: 50 (82 segments) (list of episodes)

Production
- Producers: Karl Geurs; Ken Kessel
- Editor: Rick Hinson
- Running time: 22 minutes
- Production company: Walt Disney Television Animation

Original release
- Network: The Disney Channel
- Release: January 17 – April 10, 1988
- Network: ABC
- Release: November 12, 1988 – October 26, 1991

Related
- The Many Adventures of Winnie the Pooh; Winnie the Pooh and Christmas Too; The Tigger Movie; The Book of Pooh; My Friends Tigger & Pooh

The New Adventures of Winnie the Pooh is an American animated children's television series produced by Walt Disney Television Animation. Based on the Winnie-the-Pooh books by authors A. A. Milne and E. H. Shepard, The New Adventures was the first time a major Disney character headlined an animated, made-for-television series as well as the first Disney television series based on a major animated film. The cartoon premiered with a limited run on The Disney Channel on January 17, 1988. Nine months later, the show moved to ABC as part of their Saturday morning lineup. New episodes continued until October 26, 1991.

Proving popular with children and older fans, the series remained a staple on television in the United States for nearly two decades. Publications ranging from The Los Angeles Times to TV Guide gave it extremely positive reviews for its resemblance to the earlier Disney efforts and its high production quality, receiving praise for its wholesome tradition. The show won back-to-back Emmy Awards for Outstanding Animated Program as well as two Humanitas Prizes. The show was well received by both children and their parents. Most of the viewer mail the crew received were from parents thanking the staff for producing a show that they can watch with their children. The New Adventures is credited with bringing about a resurgence of Pooh animated media, including a series of television and video specials.

== Premise ==
The series depicts the everyday lives of Christopher Robin and his 9 companions Pooh, Piglet, Tigger, Kanga, Roo, Rabbit, Eeyore, Owl and Gopher. Rather than a straightforward adaptation, the show was more Americanized than previous Pooh efforts. Episodes dealt with strong messages about honesty, responsibility, confidence, teamwork, friendship, and caring. Many stories are designed to help young children distinguish between fantasy and reality and overcome common childhood fears. Most episodes have two stories, but some are a single 22-minute episode.

== Characters ==
- Winnie the Pooh (voiced by Jim Cummings) is the main title character. He is a naive yet lovable and good-natured teddy bear. Cummings called the program timeless.
- Tigger (voiced by Paul Winchell in seasons 1–3 and Jim Cummings in seasons 1–4) is an ebullient toy tiger. He is always filled with great energy and optimism, and though always well-meaning, Tigger can also be mischievous, and his actions have sometimes led to chaos and trouble for himself and his friends. Tigger is very confident and has quite an ego, having a high opinion of himself. Tigger has a notable habit of mispronouncing various words, or stressing wrong syllables in them. Unlike previous adaptations, Tigger is shown living in a large treehouse. Winchell thought of him as a cross between the Dead End Kids and the Cowardly Lion. He is one of the only members of the original cast involved.
- Piglet (voiced by John Fiedler) is Pooh's best friend. He is a shy and kind-hearted toy piglet and is obsessed with keeping things neat and tidy, and enjoys beautiful things like flowers. His fears and nervousness often hinder his life, as Piglet runs and hides when unnecessary and often stutters when nervous, but has been shown to have a lot of hidden courage and often faces danger to help others. Piglet sometimes has an inferiority complex, although his friends think highly of him. Episodes about him tend to revolve around these traits as well as his small size. Fiedler is one of the only members of the original cast involved.
- Eeyore (voiced by Peter Cullen) is a gloomy toy donkey. He is somewhat less caustic and sarcastic in this version than in the original stories. Despite his depressive nature, Eeyore is capable of great compassion. Eeyore usually expects misfortune to happen to him, such as his house of sticks to be knocked down regularly, but accepts it when it does.
- Rabbit (voiced by Ken Sansom) is a sarcastic and finicky rabbit. In addition to wanting to be organized and practical, Rabbit's tendency to take charge is inflated to the extent that Rabbit becomes a control freak who insists on doing things exactly right, in his way and in the proper order. Rabbit keeps a garden and does whatever he can to protect it from other animals such as bugs and crows, often getting upset when anyone or anything tries to steal his vegetables. Rabbit and Tigger are usually foils for each other, reluctantly working together. Rabbit was shown as pale green in the series, compared to yellow in later efforts.
- Kanga (voiced by Patricia Parris) is a toy kangaroo and Roo's mother. She rarely appears, but she is shown to be kindhearted and calm.
- Roo (voiced by Nicholas Melody) is a young joey. He wears a light blue shirt. The smallest of the characters, Roo frequently is seen hanging around Tigger.
- Gopher (voiced by Michael Gough) is a hard-working gopher who lives underground. Gopher is shown to be a bit of a workaholic, and is obsessed with dynamite and digging in his tunnels. Gopher speaks with a Southern accent, whistles his "Ss" and wears a helmet with a light attached.
- Owl (voiced by Hal Smith) is the eldest character in the series. He presents himself as a mentor and teacher to the others, but is really quite scatterbrained. Owl enjoys telling stories about his distant relatives whenever a certain event reminds him of one, but many of his stories are pointless or absurd. Owl speaks with a Southern English accent. Along with Fielder, Smith was one of only two members of the original cast involved in the show for its entire run.
- Christopher Robin (voiced by Tim Hoskins) is a young boy that has adventures with the stuffed animals. He's also Pooh's other best friend.

For the most part, the show used a limited cast consisting only of characters in the original Milne books, with the notable exception of the Disney-created character Gopher. However, several minor characters did make appearances. Christopher Robin's mother is shown occasionally, but always with her face obscured. Kessie, a female bluebird that Rabbit rescues, makes her first appearance in this series; Kessie would later appear in The Book of Pooh. Stan Woozle and Heff Heffalump appear as a pair of honey-stealing thieves. This marked the first time heffalumps and woozles were seen on-screen. Prior to this, heffalumps and woozles had always been portrayed as creatures that did not exist and were representative of childhood fears. Instead, the show used other unseen villains such as Jagulars and the "Grab-Me Gotcha." Papa Heffalump also appeared from time to time. Other characters on the show include Owl's cousin Dexter (voiced by Hal Smith) and Skippy the Sheepdog. Chuck McCann provided additional voices as well.

== Episodes ==
Season	Episodes	TV season	Time slot (ET)	Originally aired	
Season	Episodes	TV season	Time slot (ET)	Season premiere	Season finale
1	22	1988–89	8:30 AM – 9:30 AM	January 17, 1988	March 4, 1989
2	10	1989	9:00 AM – 9:30 AM	September 9, 1989	December 2, 1989
3	10	1990	8:00 AM – 8:30 AM	August 18, 1990	November 10, 1990
4	8	1991	8:00 AM – 8:30 AM	September 7, 1991	October 26, 1991

== History ==
=== Origin ===
Winnie the Pooh was created by British authors A. A. Milne and E. H. Shepard in the 1920s. The character was named after a teddy bear owned by Milne's son, Christopher Robin Milne. He had named his toy bear after Winnie, a Canadian black bear he often saw at London Zoo, and "Pooh", a swan they had met while on holiday. Drawing from this and other toys owned by his son, Milne created the world of Winnie-the-Pooh. He first appeared by name on December 24, 1925, in a Christmas story commissioned and published by the London Evening News. The following year, a collection of Pooh stories was formally released bearing the name Winnie-the-Pooh. The stories proved very popular and inspired a sequel.

The idea for a television series was first discussed in 1957. NBC suggested Jay Ward undertake the pilot, then titled The World of Winnie the Pooh, with an option for thirty-nine episodes. Some songs and bits of dialogue were recorded, but the project was ultimately abandoned. In 1961, Disney's namesake founder Walt Disney purchased the film rights to make an animated movie starring the characters. He subsequently produced a series of three short featurettes throughout the late 1960s and early 1970s, beginning with Winnie the Pooh and the Honey Tree (1966). Disney had also aired a variety show with the characters that used electronically controlled puppetry and life-sized costume titled Welcome to Pooh Corner. This became the highest rated program on The Disney Channel. The original featurettes also proved popular, with video sales topping the charts in 1986 and 1987.

=== Development ===
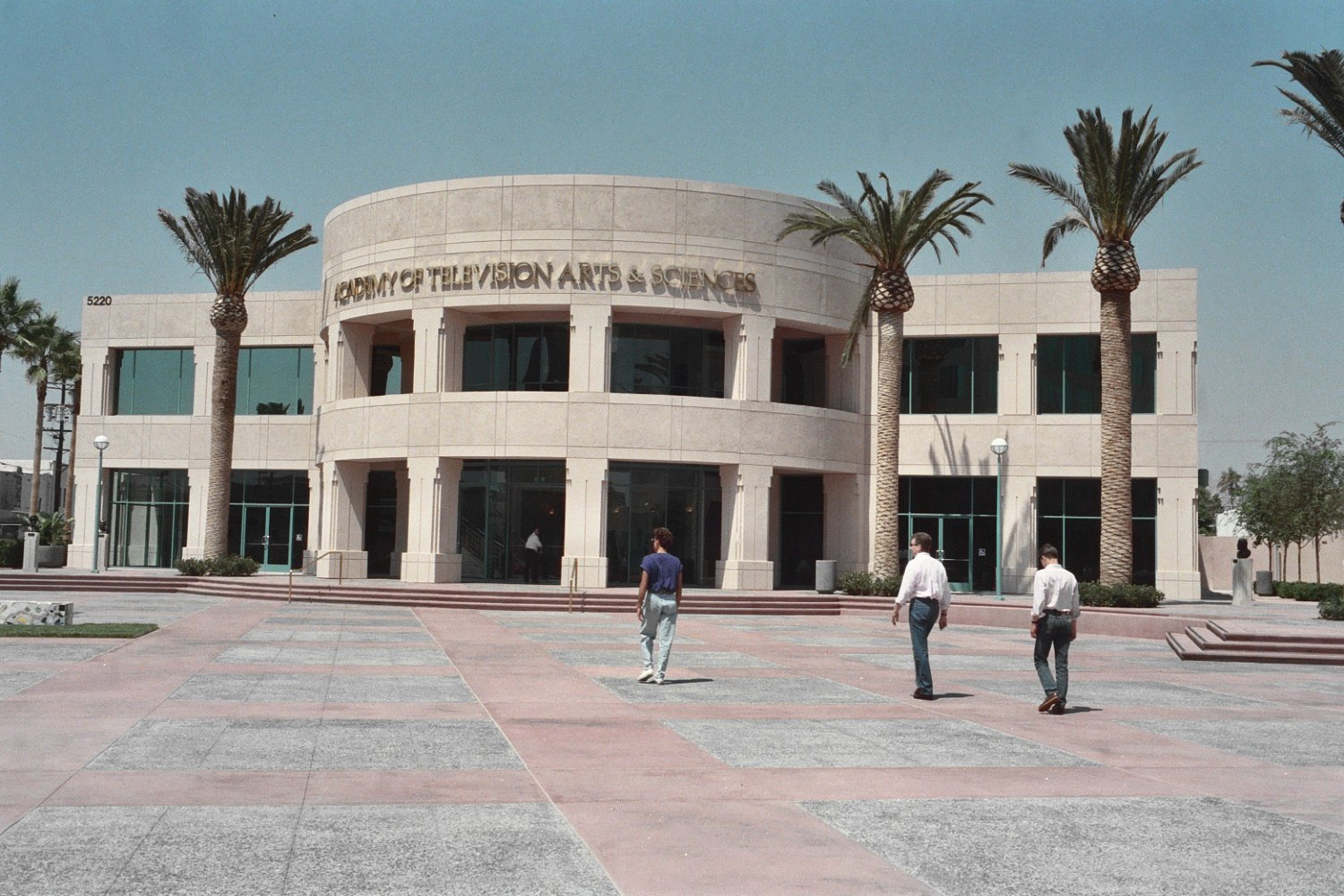
Production took place at the Academy of Television Arts & Sciences complex

An animated cartoon starring the characters was first proposed by Walt Disney Television Animation Vice President Gary Krisel during a Disney retreat, in which company assets and future prospects were examined. Rich Frank later recalled him saying: "I think Pooh is a great character for Saturday morning animation". He believed the merchandising license, held at that time by Sears, would work as a great promotional tool. Mark Zaslove was contacted to write the series bible; he had recently finished work on the DuckTales pilot episode. The document was written over Memorial Day weekend 1987, with Zaslove having only three days to complete the proposal. The pitch was well received by Disney and subsequently green-lit.

Instead of shopping Winnie the Pooh around to different networks, the show was pitched directly to ABC. The network had desperately wanted a cartoon from Disney for their Saturday morning schedule, which had fallen to last place in the ratings. They had hoped Pooh could boost ratings for the channel, specifically that they believed Winnie-the-Pooh would draw an audience old enough to operate the people meter that largely dictated television ratings at the time; ABC had blamed the people meter being too difficult for young children to operate for the failure of its previous series The Little Clowns of Happytown, a show geared toward a preschool-aged audience. Two years earlier, Michael Eisner and Krisel had set up meetings with all three major networks in hopes to sell rights to their two cartoon series: Disney's Wuzzles and Adventures of the Gummi Bears. CBS and NBC had purchased Wuzzles and Gummi Bears respectively. Realizing they had nothing left to offer ABC, Eisner and Krisel met with them anyway and received a warm response to the gaffe. A deal was reached giving ABC the show, while giving first run rights to The Disney Channel.

The show was official announced via a press release on November 15, 1987. It would mark the first time a prominent Disney character was seen on Saturday morning television. (Note: Scrooge McDuck had previously been adapted for DuckTales the year before, but was not considered to be one of the main Disney characters.) The series was viewed as a gamble, with people unsure if Pooh would survive on the new medium. Because Saturday morning cartoons had a reputation for dry and repetitive storylines, shallow characters, clichéd narratives, and cheap animation, animation fans greeted Disney's plans to adapt the books to the small screen with a mixture of skepticism and dismay, fearing the show could not top the original featurettes.

=== Production ===
ABC eagerly commissioned 25 half-hour episodes of The New Adventures of Winnie the Pooh for its first season, rather than the standard 13 to 17. Karl Geurs, a self-described Pooh fan, developed the series, which took several months. At the time, Walt Disney Television Animation had only 80 employees and two projects in production. The department did not yet have in-house facilities built, so employees worked out of the Academy of Television Arts & Sciences building. Disney put the same high standards of expectation that they had with their feature films. They had hoped to set a new standard of excellence in Saturday morning television, one with "storytelling rich in language and values, as well as delightful well acted characters" that would appeal to audiences of all ages.

We've been well-trained in being really careful about how the characters are being handled, and a lot of effort goes into the writing, just to guarantee that it's true to the original sense of Milne. Since he was writing for a different era, compromises have to be made, and we've always been very concerned about that

— Ken Kessel, Tribune Media Services

The writing process began with story premises being pitched to Zaslove, who served as story editor for the first season. The best ones were selected and sent to ABC executives for approval, followed by story outlines and scripts. The process took around four weeks per episode. The crew were "dyed-in-the-wool" fan of Milne's works, constantly checking their work against published Pooh books in order to stay true to the original sense of Milne. Special attention was given to maintain the personalities of the characters as they had originally been written. The cartoon attempted to have the right balance of both action-adventure sequences and moments of whimsy. The staff often found trouble working with the limited cast, with supervising director Ken Kessel quoted as saying: "You are restrained by what the characters can do and who they are". The writing staff hoped to channel the spirit of the Walt Disney shorts of the 1940s, drawing inspiration from artists Jack Hannah, Ward Kimball, and Jack and Dick Kinney.

The series had one internal standards director. Care was made to ensure there was no imitable behavior that children could copy. A source of friction on the show was whether Gopher was allowed to have gunpowder. A consulting company based in Glendale, California advised the team on how the characters should speak, look, and act in order to better appeal to the target demographic. The relationship with the production staff was described as positive.

Like most other cartoons, the animation was outsourced to other countries. This was mainly done for cost purposes and the limited availability of artists in the United States. All the writing, music, direction, character design, and color was worked by around 30 Disney employees in Hollywood. After this, everything was sent overseas for the animation. Approximately 300 employees would work on inking and printing. An unusually high number of animation cels were used for the show, with 20,000 cels in each episode as opposed to 8,000–12,000 for typical cartoons. The show had more drawings per minute than any other television cartoon at the time. Early episodes were completed by TMS Entertainment in Tokyo, Japan and later by Walt Disney Animation UK Ltd. in London, England, Hanho Heung-Up in Seoul, South Korea and Wang Film Productions in Taipei, Taiwan. Sixteen episodes were also produced by Walt Disney Television Australia in Sydney, New South Wales. The show set a benchmark for similar cartoons that both Disney as well as other channels expected for future shows.

After the animation was completed, the production reels were sent back to the United States where music and sound effects were added. The show's theme song, entitled "Pooh Bear", was written by Steve Nelson and sung by Steve Wood. A version with Nelson doing the vocals later appeared on his Listen What the Katmandu album. Another version of the song with Jim Cummings doing the vocals (who also voiced Pooh and Tigger) appeared in reruns of the series on The Disney Channel in 1994. Nelson also composed several additional songs that were shown on the early episodes. The music was particularly praised by critics. The show's underscore was composed by Thom Sharp. An orchestra was used to record the music, using instruments such as trumpets, woodwinds, and a full string section. The composers were given the unique opportunity to examine the animator's exposure sheets, enabling them to write music while an episode was being scripted.

=== Casting ===
The producers actively sought out the surviving original voice cast who had been used in the 1960s featurettes. Sterling Holloway, the original voice of Winnie the Pooh, read for the part, but although he was still able to perform the voice as he had, producers concluded that Holloway likely could not handle the strain of a full series commitment at his age—83 years old by the time the series launched—and health, which he had already acknowledged was failing as early as 1986; this angered Holloway's agent. A casting call was held and Jim Cummings was selected as his replacement, a role he has continued with to the present day. Cummings has claimed that veteran actors such as Burgess Meredith and E. G. Marshall had read for the part of Pooh as well.

Paul Winchell, John Fiedler and Hal Smith, the original voices for Tigger, Piglet, and Owl respectively, returned for the series. On advice from his cardiologist, Winchell mostly avoided recording with the rest of the cast to avoid the stress so the studio allowed him do his voices alone. Meanwhile, Winchell was making various trips to Africa to cure hunger, in which Cummings often understudied for Winchell. Throughout the series, Winchell voiced Tigger in the first two seasons and select episodes of the third season before Cummings took over the role. (Note: Jim Cummings voiced Tigger during Season 1's "King of the Beasties" and most of Season 3's episodes except for "Oh Bottle", "What's the Score, Pooh?", and "Eeyi Eeyi Eeyore".) When Cummings took over, Winchell said: "Take care of my little friend for me."

Most of the recording sessions occurred at B&B Sound in Burbank, California. Advanced technology allowed for the actors to record their roles without having to be in the same room. For example, Fiedler recorded his role from New York while Winchell recorded some from Florida. Cummings described Fielder's voice as "kind of like the wind blowing through tall grass. It sounded homey, and it sounding comforting." Fiedler stated he was very proud of his work on the show having enjoyed the role as much as when he started in 1968. Ken Sansom was cast as Rabbit, he later described voicing Rabbit in the series as the best professional experience he ever had.

=== Promotion ===
Going into the 1988–89 television season, networks had been struggling with a drop in ratings among children. ABC itself experienced a decline of 37 percent in kids under the age of 6. It had been surmised by ABC executives that this was due to a change in the way Nielsen ratings were collected. The data had historically been recorded automatically by a device inside household television sets. However, this had been changed the year before; children now had to use people meters for their viewership to be counted. This required manually pushing buttons that would clock kids in and out of programs, something they often had trouble successfully completing. What resulted was a demographic that could not be guaranteed to advertisers.

In order to combat this, ABC decided to fill their programming with "old favorites". The studio began to develop and retool preexisting characters and shows, ones that they hoped could attract older children and their parents into watching the program. Winnie the Pooh became the centerpiece in this plan, with the show was described as the highlight of ABC's Saturday morning schedule. The character had what network executives call "marquee value"—meaning they are familiar and already have a built-in audience. Squire Rushnell, Children's Vice President for ABC, was hoping Pooh could draw a "somewhat more sophisticated" audience in the range from 6 to 11 years.

In the three weeks leading up to its debut, ABC began airing promotions for the cartoon during prime-time hours. This was seen as a very unusual occurrence. Part of the reason this was done was to fill airtime, as the 1988 Writers Guild of America strike had caused production to be halted on prime-time television shows. Advertisements for The New Adventures of Winnie the Pooh were played during adult-oriented shows such as Thirtysomething and Moonlighting using the tagline "Now you can share your childhood heroes with your children". A television commercial that aired during the ABC Sunday Night Movie on September 4, 1988, used the tagline "Before taxes. Before puberty. There was childhood. And Winnie the Pooh".

The evening before the show made its broadcast debut, ABC aired a thirty-minute Saturday morning preview show featuring Winnie the Pooh and characters from two other debuting cartoons, The New Adventures of Beany and Cecil and A Pup Named Scooby-Doo. The show placed second in its time slot with a 7.3 rating and a 14 share, with 11.2 million viewers watching.

Sears & Roebuck and Honey Nut Cheerios partnered to host a nationwide premiere party to celebrate the series coming to ABC. Over 300 Sears stores across the country participated in the breakfast, which doubled as a charity event. The first episode was telecast on in-store video displays. More than 40,000 children attended the event. Some stores had Winnie the Pooh characters show up in costume. Sears also dedicated eight pages of their Christmas catalog to the series.

=== Broadcast history ===
During the late 1980s, a debate emerged inside Disney about whether original programs should be aired on The Disney Channel or outsourced to other networks. Some executives felt that The Disney Channel was essential to the company's growth. Others such as Gary Krisel disagreed, believing it would risk losing a generation of TV viewers who did not have cable. In the end, a compromise was reached with Disney Channel President John F. Cooke, who agreed to "pay" Krisel's division a certain price if he could get first-run rights. The show premiered on The Disney Channel on January 17, 1988. Thirteen episodes aired at 8:30am on weekends. The show's run ended that July.

The show then moved to Saturday morning on ABC where it aired for a full hour from 8:30am to 9:30am. For the second season, the show was cut back to 30 minutes to make room for new entries. The show was merged with Disney's Adventures of the Gummi Bears and aired as part of the Gummi Bears-Winnie the Pooh Hour. This partnership was short-lived and lasted only one year, when Gummi Bears moved to The Disney Afternoon. Winnie the Pooh returned as a solo effort the following year. New episodes intermixed with reruns returned for a third season in the fall of 1990. During this time, two of the show's characters—Winnie the Pooh and Tigger—were incorporated into the television special Cartoon All Stars to the Rescue. The show returned for a fourth season on September 7, 1991. The show was not renewed the following year. After the series ended, the crew produced Winnie the Pooh and Christmas Too, a primetime spin-off of the show.

Despite production ending the year before, reruns of the show continued on ABC's fall schedule for the 1992–93 season. By the following year, the show was dropped altogether by ABC and sold in syndication. Executives felt the show could make more money selling directly to television stations rather than accepting ABC's license fee. The show returned on ABC in late 1995 when reruns of the program replaced The New Adventures of Madeline. It returned again to the ABC lineup on January 4, 1997, as part of Disney's purchase of ABC the year prior; these reruns continued until September 7, 2002.

The Disney Channel began airing reruns of the series on October 3, 1994, in the United States. The show also began airing in the channel's preschool block, Playhouse Disney, when the block launched on February 1, 1999. These continued until September 1, 2006, at which point it was taken off the channel's schedule. Playhouse Disney on the other hand ran it until August 1, 2006, one month before Disney Channel ended its run. It was also shown on Toon Disney, first airing on April 18, 1998, and ran until October 19, 2007. Internationally, the show has aired in several countries including Seven Network (later The Disney Channel) in Australia, CITV (later The Disney Channel) in the United Kingdom, TF1 in France, Super RTL in Germany, Rai 1 and Rai 2 in Italy, TV Tokyo (later Disney Channel, Tokyo MX, Toon Disney, Disney XD, Disney Junior, and NHK BS Premium) in Japan, SBT (later Disney Weekend, Disney Channel and Claro TV's channel) in Brazil, and Family Channel in Canada, India, and Poland.

== Setting ==
For this adaptation, the show's setting was changed from native England to America. Christopher Robin is depicted as a typical 1980s American child rather than a 1920s British one, and is shown living in a suburban house with his mother, His mischievous imagination drew comparisons to Calvin from Calvin and Hobbes, as opposed to Milne's original interpretation. Additionally, unlike the earlier Disney featurettes, the show did not use a narrator or the storybook theme.

Although the show still used the Hundred Acre Wood as its main setting, several episodes took place in other locations. The characters occasionally traveled to the adjacent town, going to a grocery store or movie theater. Other episodes were set in more imaginative settings and involved the characters journeying into the clouds or down in a wishing well. Two episodes took place in the Wild West, one in the form of a play. These styles of episodes were done away with later on. The writing staff felt they worked best in the Hundred Acre Wood.

The writers made a point of keeping the show as timeless as possible, having the Hundred Acre Wood become a "never, never land". The show did its best to leave out all contemporary conveniences. The approach to episodes was to put more emphasis on adventure, yet keep the integrity of Milne's characters. To add excitement, the occasional waterfall or cliff was added, which the show found tough to fit in. Its dialogue was updated to make the show more relatable to younger generations.

== Themes and analysis ==
The show was conceived as a comedy of manners and was hailed as a rare cartoon devoid of any violence or villains. The show's main theme revolved around the complications and misunderstandings that often arose between the characters and their eventual return to normalcy. For instance, one episode dealt with Pooh believing Rabbit was moving away after hearing he had "eaten him out of house and [honey]". Special attention was paid to write from a child's point of view, rather than an adult's. For this, the writers drew inspiration from Bill Cosby, Gahan Wilson, and The Phantom Tollbooth. Additionally, the staff was also very conscious of their older viewers—dubbed "older kids"—and would always aim for a sensibility that would appeal to them as well. Kessel noted that while the show often had writing that would go over the heads of little kids, the original Milne books did as well.

Unlike previous adaptations of Winnie the Pooh, the stories were for the most part not based on chapters from A. A. Milne's books. The writers made a point of not copying from Milne, but instead drawing the essence of him for the modern day; keeping the same charm and style as the original stories. The episodes have very little action in terms of plot, which in later years has drawn comparisons to Seinfeld. The main storylines typically derived from the characters and their relationships to each other. Episode plots ranged from the simple, such as Winnie the Pooh searching for honey (stylized as hunny), to the more dramatic, such as Christopher Robin becoming trapped under his bed. Some episodes spoofed published works of fiction including Frankenstein and Sherlock Holmes.

Episodes focused on socioemotional issues, dealing with topics such as teamwork, resourcefulness, how to triumph over challenges, the power of positive outlook, and the value of friendship. The series delivered strong messages about honesty, responsibility, persistence, cooperative effort, friendship and caring. The morals taught in each story allow children to draw parallels to their own lives. These were offered in a far more subtle manner than the "prosocial snippets" seen on other programs. Many stories are designed to help young children distinguish between fantasy and reality and overcome common childhood fears. Innumerable children's expert panels continued throughout its lengthy network run to highly commend and recommend the series to the three-to-ten-year-old crowd, even growing tolerant enough to be amused by the "hunny/honey" spelling controversy.

== Reception ==
=== Critical response ===
Only a few program even approach the quality of ABC's four-season-old New Adventures of Winnie the Pooh, the most artfully written and drawn kids' series on the air.

— Noel Holston, The Pittsburgh Press

Charles Solomon of the Los Angeles Times called the show "the best made-for-TV cartoon show in several seasons". Months later, he claimed it as "not only the classiest new show of the season, but also one of the best-looking series ever animated for television", and gave a similarly positive review the next year. The Atlanta Journal-Constitution said it "contained much more detailed and lively animation than the usual kidvid". TV Guide said the show had "theatrical-grade animation, sprightly stories, conscientious eschewing of laugh tracks and best of all, the willingness to let the visual jokes speak for themselves". Entertainment Weekly gave the show an "A" saying "there's enough excitement, including lots of slapstick and bad guys, to keep '90s adventurers happy". The New York Times called the show "lovingly faithful" to the original Milne books. Lee Winfrey of Knight-Ridder says the writers successfully maintained the integrity of Milne's characters and praised the animators for Ernest H. Shepard's illustrations. The Milwaukee Journal said the show will "offer children and probably their parents, a gentle walk through Pooh Corner". Gene Seymour of Knight-Ridder called the best animation on weekly television outside of the General Mills Commercials. The Dayton Daily News called the program one of the best on television writing "The animation of this offering from the Disney's studios is not as sumptuous as the company's feature films, but it is miles above the television norm". Charles Witback praised the show claiming that "Milne [came] out on top " and they remain unique to the flashy, noisy Hollywood. The San Bernardino Sun wrote "if kids like the verbal wit of the other shows, they'll tackle the rich sophistication of Winnie the Pooh".

Good Housekeeping wrote that the show was "sweet and endearing, though its educational value is essentially limited to a kid-tailored 'I'm okay, you're okay' theme". Common Sense Media gave the show 4 stars, saying "the lessons are just as classic and time-tested as the characters". Hal Erickson, writing in his book Television Cartoon Shows, called the show a delightful eye of calm in "the hurricane of hectic Saturday morning slapstick". DVDizzy.com praised the show calling it "true both to the spirit of Milne's creation and the animation of Disney's terrific short films". DVDVerdict.com called the show "perfectly respectable imitations that still rank as stellar, sweet-natured children's entertainment", going on to write "Kids should enjoy this stuff and adults should feel comfortable leaving their young ones in the care of this of this good-hearted programming for an hour". AnimatedViews called the show "a well-remembered if not exceptional series that slotted into the kind of programming that filled the Disney Afternoons." David Perlmutter, in his book America Toons In, called the longevity of the show "a testament to the enduring appeal of the beloved characters". Common Sense Media have the series a four out of five stars, saying, "Classic characters will delight preschoolers."

Not all reviews have been positive. Evan Levine, writing for the Philadelphia Daily News, gave the program a mixed review, saying "the characters are all true to form, but the colors are overly bright, and the whole look is harsh" but adding "this series is certainly better than a lot of other cartoons that we've seen". Jan Crain Rudeen, writing for the Scripps Howard News Service, described the series and the resulting video releases as "awful", which she felt lacked imagination. Desson Howe of The Washington Post described the series as "cheaply sweetened fare". One particular episode has been a source of controversy. "Sorry Wrong Slusher", in which the characters stay up late, order pizza, and watch a late night "slusher film", has been called violent.

=== Ratings ===
Select Nielsen ratings (Note: Despite the fact that the two programs were technically considered a single show, ratings were not reportedly uniformly.)
Date	Score
September 10, 1988	5.9/22
September 17, 1988	5.7/23
September 24, 1988	5.1/21
October 1, 1988	5.2/22
September 9, 1989	4.9/25
September 16, 1989	4.4/20
September 23, 1989	4.1/18

The network television premiere on Saturday, September 10, 1988, was hailed as an immediate success. The show won its time-slot with 5.9/23 Nielsen ratings share, translating to 5.7 million viewers. ABC, who had been in third place for Saturday morning the year prior, won every time-slot averaging a 5.0 rating/20 share. This trend continued for the next three weeks. (Note: Ratings are notoriously tricky to obtain for children's programming and not guaranteed to be accurate. Because of this, very few sources publish Saturday morning ratings outside of premiere dates.) Selby Hall, Marketing Manager for ABC, was quoted as saying "[the show had] been very successful on Saturday mornings in the States". The high ratings caused an extra push behind the international airings of the program. Throughout the season, the show continued to receive "solid" ratings. The show ranked 10th place out of all Saturday morning cartoons for the season.

During the 1989–90 television schedule, the series was paired with Disney's Adventures of the Gummi Bears. The show once again won its time-slot, but fell one rating point from the previous year's debut. The show repeated this the next week, but was beaten by Captain N: The Game Master the next two weeks.

By 1993, the show had fallen in the ratings. Finishing 27th out of the 36 Saturday morning programs, the show averaged a 2.1/9 Nielsen rating share. The show received a 3.3 Nielsen rating in late February 1993 corresponding to 3.2 million viewers. In 1997, MediaWeek ranked it 301st out of every broadcast show. By the late 1990s, the show was one of the top five Saturday morning cartoons. It had a (2.5/11) market share in Boys 2–11 and a (2.2/11) market share in boys 6–11.

=== Awards and nominations ===
For its debut season, the show won a Daytime Emmy Award for Outstanding Animated Program. During his acceptance speech, Mark Zaslove praised the actors and animators for their dedication to the series and specifically thanked Jymn Magon and Karl Geurs for the humanity they brought to the program. The following year the series was awarded the same honor, this time in a tie with Beetlejuice. The show was awarded the first of two Humanitas Prizes during its first season for "[examining] the need to both hold onto and let go of love". Three years later, the show would pick up its second prize for its dramatization "of the struggle to assume responsibility and live with the consequences of your mistakes". The show also received a commemoration from the Action for Children's Television with President Peggy Charren calling the show "an imaginative extension of the Pooh stories...preserving the essence of the original characters".

The show was cited in the Children's Television Act of 1990 as an example of a positive educational program. The show received a special salute during the opening session of the Congressional Club in 1988. Joan Lunden, co-host of Good Morning America, hosted the opening session which included United States Congressional and Cabinet wives as well as their children and grandchildren. BuzzFeed ranked the theme song third in their list of "7 Cartoon Theme Songs Guaranteed to Earworm You"

Awards and nominations for The New Adventures of Winnie the Pooh
Date	Award	Category	Nominee(s)	Result
1988	CableACE Award	Children's Entertainment Series or Special, 8 and Younger		Won
1988	Parents' Choice Awards	Silver Seal Award		Won
1989	Golden Reel Awards	Sound Effects Mixing	"Paw & Order"	Nominated
1989	Golden Reel Awards	Sound Effects Mixing	"The Masked Offender"	Nominated
1989	Young Artist Awards	Best Young Actor Voice-Over Role	Tim Hoskins	Nominated
1989	Action for Children's Television	Commercial Broadcast Award		Won
1989	Daytime Emmy Awards	Outstanding Animated Program		Won
1989	Humanitas Prize	Children's Animation	Doug Hutchinson, Larry Bernard and Mark Zaslove for "Find Her, Keep Her"	Won
1989	Parents Choice Awards	Gold Seal Award		Won
1990	Daytime Emmy Awards	Outstanding Animated Program		Won
1990	Parents Choice Awards	Gold Seal Award		Won
1991	Daytime Emmy Awards	Outstanding Film Sound Editing		Nominated
1991	Golden Reel Awards	Outstanding Achievement	"The Good, The Bad, and The Tigger"	Nominated
1992	Daytime Emmy Awards	Outstanding Animated Program		Nominated
1992	Daytime Emmy Awards	Outstanding Film Sound Editing		Nominated
1992	Humanitas Prize	Children's Animation	Bruce Reid Schaefer for "Home Is Where The Home Is"	Won

== Home media ==
Logo used for Disney's Pooh products in the 1990s

Although Disney has never released the complete series on home video, there have been numerous video collections released over the years. The first was a collection of 10 videocassette tapes issued by Walt Disney Home Video. Each VHS contained two to four episodes, with the first three tapes released in 1989. This was followed by an additional two the next year, one more in 1991 and four more in 1992. Due to a twenty-five year license agreement on Pooh merchandise, these videotapes were released only in Sears. Sales were very poor, despite a solid consumer base.

Eric Schulz, Vice President of Marketing at Disney, recalled an incident one Friday afternoon at Kmart where parents were shopping: "We noticed that no Winnie the Pooh characters were available. Several consumers were asking the store clerks if the Poohs were sold out". Schulz and his team discovered there were no plush toys available at Kmart, due to the licensing. They also discovered that this license was expiring in just a few months and would not be renewed. That afternoon, the marketing team returned to the office and began to plan new ideas to sell Winnie the Pooh videos.

In 1994, on the day that the Sears license expired, a nationwide Pooh video and plush promotion was launched. Videos were packaged with Pooh plush characters together in a single box. Disney proclaimed 1994, "The Year of Pooh", which coincided with the 70th anniversary of Winnie the Pooh. In lieu of traditional press kit, Disney sent out a Winnie the Pooh cookie jar to the press outlets, a decision which received overwhelmingly positive reaction. The Today Show proudly displayed its Pooh cookie jar on television while the hosts talked about the new video releases.

Two collections of compilation tapes called Pooh Playtime and Pooh Learning were released with three videotapes encompassing each set. The videos featured between two and four episodes of The New Adventures of Winnie the Pooh and featured new songs written by Dave Kinnoin. Sales were very high, with numerous videos turned up on the Video Bestseller List. In just three weeks, Disney had sold twenty times more Winnie the Pooh videos than they had in the previous twelve months. By 1995, Pooh videos sold over thirty times what they had sold the year before, despite the fact that Disney had only repackaged existing products. Because of their success, two additional videos were added to each collection. A third collection entitled Pooh Friendship was released in 1997, bringing the three collections to fifteen videos between them.

The show first appeared on DVD in the United Kingdom. Under the title The Magical World of Winnie the Pooh, eight volumes were released consisting of four episodes apiece. The first five volumes of this series later appeared in the United States under the name Growing Up with Winnie the Pooh. Appearing in February 2005, the releases were made to coincide with the premiere of Pooh's Heffalump Movie. These episodes did not include the original opening credits, but instead had new sequences specifically made for the discs. Episodes of the show have also been released as part of the "special features" in the DVD releases of Winnie the Pooh movies, such as The Tigger Movie and Winnie the Pooh: Springtime with Roo.

The series became available on Disney+ when the service launched on November 12, 2019.

== Legacy ==
The series helped spawn a successful Winnie the Pooh media franchise, which grew into a series of made-for-TV holiday specials, two additional television series, and four theatrically released movies. Many of the cast members continued to work with these Winnie the Pooh adaptations. Jim Cummings continues to voice Pooh and Tigger in the present day. Paul Winchell briefly reprised his role as Tigger in Pooh's Grand Adventure: The Search for Christopher Robin (1997) as well as some of the 1990s specials. John Fiedler voiced Piglet until his death in 2005. Peter Cullen continued to voice Eeyore until he was replaced by Bud Luckey for the 2011 film. Ken Sansom continued voicing Rabbit until 2010. Much of the writers and directors returned for Pooh's Grand Adventure and The Book of Pooh. Bruce Talkington has since written many children's books based on Winnie the Pooh.

The show was one of the last times Winnie the Pooh was designed and marketed for audiences of all ages. In the years following the series, Walt Disney Home Video began to reposition their strategy and marketed the television series, and Winnie the Pooh in general, towards younger age groups, despite critics claiming the show can be enjoyed by members of all ages. In later years, the show has been touted as strictly for preschoolers. DVDizzy summarized the idea saying "Even though Milne's books had won over readers of all ages and even though kids weren't buying movie tickets and merchandise, Disney seemed set on the idea that Pooh was strictly for little ones, those not even old enough to attend school".

The program caused a resurgence of popularity of Winnie the Pooh that continues to this day, to the point of the character being Disney's second largest animated franchise, only behind Mickey Mouse & Friends. Following the home video releases, Disney's annual revenue from Winnie the Pooh rose from $100 million to more than $1 billion in just four years. Winnie the Pooh is now the most successful Disney character, surpassing Mickey Mouse. As of 2012, it is the third most popular media franchise in the United States.

To promote the opening of Winnie the Pooh: The New Musical Adaptation, the production released a recording of Corbin Bleu covering the show's theme song. Bleu sings the original Winnie the Pooh theme for the actual production.
