= All Dogs Go to Heaven: The Series =

Television series

- The title card of the animated series
- Genre: Animated sitcom; Supernatural fiction
- Based on: All Dogs Go to Heaven by Don Bluth
- Directed by: Gary Selvaggio (seasons 1–2); John Grusd (season 3)
- Voices of: Steven Weber; Dom DeLuise; Sheena Easton; Ernest Borgnine; Charles Nelson Reilly; Bebe Neuwirth
- Theme music composer: Mark Watters; Lorraine Feather (lyrics)
- Opening theme: "A Little Heaven", performed by Gene Miller, Clydene Jackson-Edwards, and Carmen Twillie
- Ending theme: "A Little Heaven" (instrumental)
- Composers: Mark Watters (original songs); Robert Irving (music scores)
- Country of origin: United States
- Original language: English
- No. of seasons: 3
- No. of episodes: 40

Production
- Executive producers: Paul Sabella; Jonathan Dern
- Producers: John Grusd (season 3); Jymn Magon (season 3)
- Running time: 22 minutes
- Production company: Metro-Goldwyn-Mayer Animation (Note: Animation outsourced to Wang Film Productions and Thai Wang Film Productions.)

Original release
- Network: First-run syndication
- Release: September 21, 1996 – February 28, 1998
- Network: Fox Family Channel
- Release: July 31 – November 6, 1998

Related
- All Dogs Go to Heaven 2; An All Dogs Christmas Carol

All Dogs Go to Heaven: The Series is an American animated sitcom, which aired from 1996 to 1998 in syndication and on Fox Family from 1998 to 1999 with 40 half-hour episodes produced in total. Don Bluth's 1989 animated feature All Dogs Go to Heaven featured a disreputable mongrel (with a mixture of a German Shepherd) named Charlie who died, went to heaven, escaped back to Earth for vengeance on his murderer and then found redemption with the help of a young orphan girl named Anne-Marie. It spawned a 1996 sequel, All Dogs Go to Heaven 2. The series takes place after the second film.

Most of the voice actors from the films reprised their roles in the series, including Dom DeLuise, Ernest Borgnine, Charles Nelson Reilly, Bebe Neuwirth, Sheena Easton and Adam Wylie. Steven Weber provided the speaking and singing voices of Charlie B. Barkin, who was voiced in the films by Burt Reynolds and Charlie Sheen (and singing voice provided in the second film by Jesse Corti). A direct-to-video Christmas special An All Dogs Christmas Carol serves as the finale.

== Plot ==
Following the events of All Dogs Go to Heaven 2, Charlie and Itchy reside in San Francisco as guardian angels. In each episode, Annabelle assigns them a task, and while they always try to do the right thing, they consistently get stuck in awkward situations. Charlie's duplicitous enemy Carface and his sidekick, Killer – returning from the first film – also appear, as did Charlie's friends: the Irish Setter Sasha; the whippet angel Annabelle, and the human boy David. The series also introduces three new characters: Bess, an award-winning, purebred show dog and Itchy's romantic interest; Lance, a by-the-book Doberman Pinscher, whom Charlie is jealous of for his heroic acts; and Belladonna, Annabelle's demonic cousin.

== Voice cast ==
- Steven Weber as Charles "Charlie" B. Barkin
- Dom DeLuise as Itchiford "Itchy Itchiford" Dachshund
- Bebe Neuwirth as Annabelle / Belladonna
- Sheena Easton as Sasha la Fleur
- Adam Wylie as David
- Ernest Borgnine as Carface Caruthers
- Charles Nelson Reilly as Killer
- Carlos Alazraqui as Otto
- Tress MacNeille as Winifred Bessamay "Bess" de Winkerville / Gerta
- Kevin Michael Richardson as Manfred
- Mark Benninghofen as Lance the Wonder Pup
- Jess Harnell and Steve Mackall as The Blueshounds
- April Winchell as Tiffany

== Episodes ==
=== Series overview ===
Season	Episodes	Originally released		
Season	Episodes	First released	Last released	Network
1	13	September 21, 1996	February 22, 1997	Syndication
2	13	September 20, 1997	February 28, 1998	Syndication
3	14	July 31, 1998	November 6, 1998	Fox Family Channel

=== Season 1 (1996–97) ===
No. overall	No. in season	Title	Written by	Original release date
1	1	"The Doggone Truth"	Mark Young	September 21, 1996
For having messed up three missions, Charlie is on probation so isn't allowed to do, say, or even think anything bad until he does a good deed. When Carface and Killer take over the Flea Bite Café and turn it into a video game arcade, Charlie and Itchy have to dress up like girls to get the café back. Note: There is a running gag in this episode. Since Charlie is on probation, they're not allowed to do, say, or think anything bad. Whenever Charlie is about to say something bad (which includes telling lies), a lightning bolt strikes him on his rear end.
2	2	"Field Trip"	Bruce Talkington	September 28, 1996
Charlie has to babysit Sasha's six puppies when she leaves to prepare for her anniversary and is given a list of things to do: feed, bathe, and give them a nap. When the sixth puppy escapes to go on an adventure, Charlie and Itchy must rescue the puppy from the hands of Carface. Absent: Annabelle. Bess doesn't count, because this is before she comes into the show as a main character.
3	3	"Lance, the Wonder Pup"	Mark Hoffmeier	October 5, 1996
Charlie and Itchy are joined by Lance the Wonder Pup, who starts imposing rules and outshining Charlie at being a guardian angel. Eventually, Itchy and Lance run into a situation where the rulebook doesn't help.
4	4	"Puppy Sitter"	Unknown	October 19, 1996
Anabelle gives Charlie and Itchy the assignment to find a home for a little puppy, although Charlie does mess up her signal on the receiving end and leaves out the part that the puppy was a wolf cub. The puppy turns out to be extremely wild and impossible to find a home. Charlie, however, discovers that Sasha is impressed with how noble he is when taking care of a puppy, thus, he tries to go on a date with Sasha, using the puppy to his advantage.
5	5	"Dogs in the House"	Steve Brasfield	November 2, 1996
Itchy is unable to properly beg for food, unlike Charlie, who masters it quite often. Under Charlie's guidance, Itchy begs a rich kid for ice cream, who, in return, takes Itchy as a new pet. Charlie successfully rescues Itchy from the clutches of the kid, but Itchy refuses to leave and tells Charlie that the kid is lonely and they must help her make friends. Meanwhile, Carface and Killer have picked the same house as their next target in a string of burglaries.
6	6	"Cyrano de Barkinac"	Ellen Svaco and Colleen Taber	November 9, 1996
A dog called Bess becomes a star to help with the Flea Bag Cafe, leaving Charlie jealous and hurt. He decides to ruin a date with Bess but it ends successfully with a lick. Absent: Anabelle, Carface, and Killer.
7	7	"An Itch in Time"	Unknown	November 16, 1996
David receives a voice recorder on his birthday, as Charlie and Itchy bump into him with it on the streets the following morning, but when he shows the gadget in school, he ends up receiving detention. Charlie, who never had a birthday of his own due to him being a street dog, wants to give David a great birthday. Using David's new voice recorder, Charlie creates an impromptu David look-alike with the voice recorder repeatedly saying mathematical equations and sneaks him out of detention, but it makes things worse.
8	8	"Mission Im-paws-ible"	Jeanette Shelburne	November 23, 1996
Carface and Killer steal Itchy's Heavenly Collar, so Charlie, Itchy, and Sasha plan to get it back. When the plan involves Sasha flirting with Carface, Charlie must get her to like him again.
9	9	"Mutts Ado About Nothing"	Steve Brasfield	November 30, 1996
Bess and Sasha meet for the first time, and decide to plan a double date with Charlie and Itchy in order for the two to stop arguing. They are however unaware that Anabelle switched Charlie and Itchy's personality souls into each other's bodies. Charlie is in Itchy's body, and Itchy is in Charlie's body and it becomes worse. Absent: Carface and Killer.
10	10	"Dog Eat Dog"	Don Gillies	January 18, 1997
Sasha leaves town to see her sister's new puppies in Los Angeles and leaves Charlie and Itchy in charge of the Flea Bite until she returns.
11	11	"Will Success Spoil Itchy Itchiford?"	Michael Patrick Dobkins	January 25, 1997
Charlie auditions to be the new spokesdog for Gulpo Dog Food, but the advertising company picks Itchy instead. Now Itchy is famous and Charlie is left sulking in the Flea Bite Café, leaving everyone wondering, "Will success spoil Itchy Itchiford?"
12	12	"Heaventh Inning Stretch"	Jymn Magon	February 1, 1997
Charlie and Itchy are assigned to help a boy who wants to join a baseball team, but if they succeed, Itchy will go back into Heaven. With the separation between him and his best friend at stake, Charlie struggles with moral dilemma: to deliberately fail the mission or help out and let Itchy go back to Heaven. Absent: Bess, Sasha, Carface, and Killer.
13	13	"The Perfect Dog"	Mark Zaslove	February 22, 1997
Sasha wants the perfect dog, and Charlie decides to give her that perfect dog - by "pretending" to have been hit by the car so bad, to be a nice dog and smother her with love and kindness.

=== Season 2 (1997–98) ===
No. overall	No. in season	Title	Written by	Original release date
14	1	"La Doggie Vita"	Mark Zaslove	September 20, 1997
Charlie and Itchy's new mission is becoming a bit more mysterious, and that they believe that Anabelle has sent them an evil mission: to join Carface and Killer at a meat packing plant. Anabelle believes that "she", actually being her evil cousin Belladonna tricked them, and that she wants Charlie to be in her group, but Itchy won't allow it at all. Absent: Bess and Sasha.
15	2	"Travels with Charlie"	Unknown	September 27, 1997
Charlie is burnt out and needs a vacation. He manages to convince Itchy into taking, but with so many bad things happening in the city, Charlie can't even go a block without being someone's Guardian Angel.
16	3	"Charlie's Cat-Astrophe"	Unknown	October 4, 1997
Charlie and Itchy are assigned to return a cat named Dilly to her owner, but when Dilly gets taken in by a dog-hating old lady, Charlie and Itchy must use a Miracle Dog Tag to become cats to rescue her.
17	4	"Magical Misery Tour"	Mark Zaslove	October 11, 1997
Charlie seems to have overbooked his schedule between a fight with Otto's gang, his Poker buds, and having lunch with Sasha. Charlie is worried until he, Itchy, and David find a magic multiplying box, which he uses to clone himself to make each appointment. Now Charlie is in triple trouble when each of his clones mess up in their own way during each appointment, ultimately leaving the real Charlie to confront his friends, enemies, and Sasha. Absent: Bess, Carface, and Killer.
18	5	"Miss Guidance"	Unknown	October 18, 1997
Charlie volunteers to go get notes that David's crush, Alex, left in her mom's car, but Sasha must go with Charlie instead of Itchy, because he is sick from running around in the rain. Charlie however doesn't see women as good partners for this type of thing. Sasha decides to show Charlie what women can do.
19	6	"Fearless Fido"	Brian Swenlin	November 8, 1997
Bess is being threatened by Manfred and wants out of the relationship to be with Itchy. Itchy tries everything to protect her as Manfred makes fun, but Charlie saves Bess from being hurt by Manfred. Itchy is later hypnotized by a magician who turns him into a superhero. Absent: Sasha, Carface, and Killer.
20	7	"Pair-a-Dogs Lost"	Unknown	November 15, 1997
Charlie and Itchy are watching a wilderness movie, and Itchy becomes frightened. Charlie tells Itchy that every dog has got wolf blood in them, even Itchy. Charlie then decides that they are going on a trip into the wild, so Itchy can live up to his heritage.
21	8	"Kibbleland"	Steve Brasfield	November 22, 1997
Kibbleland's new game has come out and Charlie decides to try it, but he becomes selfish to not only think of himself and nobody else, not even Sasha. This step becomes a serious situation, when Belladonna tricks Sasha into playing the game as a big tornado comes and sucks her into the world of Kibbleland. Charlie and Itchy must find a way to rescue her before she is stuck there forever.
22	9	"The Rexx Files"	Michael Patrick Dobkins	January 31, 1998
Anabelle tells Itchy and Charlie to guard a "crystal". Charlie and Itchy have been playing pranks. Charlie thinks he sees a UFO and tells Itchy, who thinks to be just another prank, and leaves. Then the "aliens" come into Itchy and Charlie's home, and scare Charlie away. The "aliens" were actually Carface and Killer. When Charlie finds this out, he plots a scheme to get them back and the "crystal".
23	10	"Sidekicked"	Unknown	February 7, 1998
Itchy gets sent to the pound and has to break out with help from Killer.
24	11	"Heaven Nose"	Unknown	February 14, 1998
Charlie has been lying a bit too much lately, so Anabelle makes his nose grow every time he tells a lie. Charlie must start telling the truth or will face the consequences.
25	12	"The Big Fetch"	Jeanette Shelburne (premise); Jymn Magon and Henry Gilroy (story + teleplay)	February 21, 1998
Charlie falls into a coma and has a dream of him becoming a detective to find out about a cat-scheme back in the 1930s. Absent: Bess.
26	13	"All Creatures Great & Dinky"	Unknown	February 28, 1998
The next mission for Charlie and Itchy takes them to the sewers to help a colony of mice. Toxic smelling paint and other junk washed down the drains, taking away their freedom of living without anything to worry about. Charlie and Itchy team up with Moxie, a mother mouse in the colony, to crack the case. They follow the drain to Carface and Killer's curio shop, trying to transform new looking toy trains to look like antiques to sell for loads of money. The problem is almost unbearable for Charlie to succeed in, until Anabelle tells him that the pollution in the water would someday end up in his dish. Note: This was the last episode to have Charlie rendered with a dark brown & white coloring on his fur as it was replaced with light brown and yellow fur.

=== Season 3 (1998) ===
No. overall	No. in season	Title	Written by	Original release date
27	1	"Free Nelly"	Don Gillies	July 31, 1998
Circus animals are being mistreated, and Charlie and Itchy are on the case. They find out that an elephant named Nelly is abused, and it is their job to video tape it and send it to animal control. On the tape however, Charlie is caught doing some embarrassing things, so he tells Itchy to forget the tape, as they will find Nelly a new home. Note: This was the first episode to have the shortened intro and theme song in the credits.
28	2	"Dogfaces"	Steve Brasfield	August 7, 1998
Charlie and Itchy are told to go to a military base and show a kid how to have fun, but Anabelle also sent them there so Charlie would learn some respect for authority figures.
29	3	"Charlie the Human"	Michael Patrick Dobkins	August 14, 1998
Charlie and Itchy are assigned on a mission to watch an absent-minded scientist. The two dogs have a miracle dog tag, supposed to be used for emergencies only. When Charlie persuades Itchy to let him have it, Charlie turns himself into a human.
30	4	"History of All Dogs"	Henry Gilroy	August 21, 1998
Itchy and Charlie write a report for David on the history of all dogs and how they helped society. Note: It was the first episode to originally air on Fox Family (formerly The Family Channel).
31	5	"Trading Collars"	Diane Fresco	August 28, 1998
Charlie and Itchy take a stroll on the upper-class neighborhood and meet a rich show dog named Thor, who looks exactly like Charlie. Charlie wants to know what it is like to be pampered, and Thor wants to know what it is like to be a free-spirited street dog, so the two switch places. When Thor's difficult agility contest comes up, and Charlie is expected to do a dangerous move, Charlie soon realises that switching places between each other is more difficult than at first thought.
32	6	"Whacked to the Future"	Michael Patrick Dobkins	September 4, 1998
Charlie Barkin sees himself in 200 years in his life, that he lives dirty and very filthy, and that many others don't seem to get along with him at all. When his dream takes him to a future where dogs live under the oppressive rule of the canine-hating "Deliverer", he decides to change his ways before it is too late.
33	7	"Dr. Beagle and Mangy Hide"	Brian Swenlin	September 11, 1998
Carface gets his hands on a dangerous substance that is supposed to turn dogs into monsters. He and Killer decide to test it out on Charlie. Killer taints Charlie's dog food when he is not looking, and Charlie turns into a monster. Carface and Killer plan to use Charlie to steal things for them, and then turn Charlie in to the cops when they are done with him. Itchy learns about this situation and goes to rescue Charlie.
34	8	"Charlie's Angle"	Don Gillies	September 18, 1998
Charlie is assigned to train three angels-in-training, but when he fails to do so, and he needs their help, they mess up, and Charlie gets in deeper trouble.
35	9	"Agent from F.I.D.O."	Jymn Magon	September 25, 1998
Itchy tells the story of the amazing Double Dog Dare and how he saved the world.
36	10	"Bess and Itchy's Dog School Reunion"	Jeanette Shelburne	October 2, 1998
Charlie's little advice to Itchy "Be a phony to impress a phony" and "Show dogs never itch in public" makes Bess' reunion turn to disaster. Itchy, hiding the fact that he was a street dog, escorts Bess to her dog school reunion. All the dogs attending are high-horsed snobs, especially the Afghan Hound Tiffany. When she puts down Bess, Charlie convinces Itchy for revenge. Prank after prank, nothing is resolved but a big mess for the spaniel to clean up. After Tiffany secretly puts fleas on Itchy, the beam she is standing on collapses. With the other dogs not willing to help, it is Itchy to the rescue.
37	11	"When Hairy Met Silly"	Michael Patrick Dobkins	October 9, 1998
Charlie tells the story of how he met Itchy, and how he had been a bad dog to a pair of puppies arguing over a bag of dog food.
38	12	"The Wrong Stuff"	Diane Fresco	October 16, 1998
Charlie becomes obsessed with being caught on tape doing a heroic act. That is, until Itchy almost drowns, but the reporters catch him saving Itchy, and the two dogs get to go to an exclusive hotel suite.
39	13	"Haunted Is as Haunted Does"	Jymn Magon	October 30, 1998
Itchy gets so scared that he couldn't help Charlie, who decides it is time for Itchy to face his fears. He tells Itchy that they are spending the night in a "haunted" mansion. Charlie thinks it will help Itchy get over his fears. It appears at first nothing is in the house, but both dogs soon realize that they are wrong.
40	14	"He Barked, She Barked"	Jymn Magon	November 6, 1998
Charlie is on trial, accused by Belladonna of abusing his angelic position. If he is found guilty, Charlie will be dismissed from Heavenly duties and forced to work for the other side. Charlie must find a way to get out from this tricky situation.

== Music ==
Mark Watters wrote the show's score. Some episodes feature a song, which was more frequent in the first two seasons, and season 3 only has one. "The Perfect Dog" and "Take the Easy Way Out" earned the series two Daytime Emmy nominations for Outstanding Original Song.

Title	Composer	Lyricist	Performer(s)	Episode
"A Little Heaven" (theme song)	Mark Watters	Lorraine Feather	Gene Miller; Clydene Jackson-Edwards; Carmen Twillie	All episodes
"Casanova"	Mark Watters	Lorraine Feather	Ernest Borgnine	"The Doggone Truth"
"By the Book"	Ray Colcord	Lorraine Feather	Mark Benninghofen; Steven Weber	"Lance, the Wonder Pup"
"It's Gotta Come from the Heart"	Michael Silversher; Patty Silversher	Michael Silversher; Patty Silversher	Steven Weber	"Cyrano de Barkinac"
"Everything a Girl Wants"	Michael Silversher; Patty Silversher	Michael Silversher; Patty Silversher	Sheena Easton	"Mission Im-paws-ible"
"Itchin' and a-Twitchin"	Tom Scott	Lorraine Feather	Steven Weber; Dom DeLuise	"Dog Eat Dog"
"The Perfect Dog"	Michael Silversher; Patty Silversher	Michael Silversher; Patty Silversher	Sheena Easton; Steven Weber; Dom DeLuise	"The Perfect Dog"
"Take the Easy Way Out"	Richard Kaufman; Scooter Pietsch	Lorraine Feather	Bebe Neuwirth; Andrea L. Robinson	"La Doggie Vita"
"Party on a UFO"	Kevin Quinn; Randy Petersen	Kevin Quinn; Randy Petersen	Jess Harnell; Steve Mackall; Steven Weber; Kevin Quinn; Randy Petersen	"The Rexx Files"
"Sidekicks"	Megan Cavallari	David Goldsmith	Dom DeLuise; Charles Nelson Reilly	"Sidekicked"
"Be Your Own Dog"	Scooter Pietsch	Lorraine Feather	Sheena Easton; Andrea L. Robinson; Maxi Anderson; Carmen Twillie	"The Big Fetch"
"Why Not Be Happy Now?"	Mark Watters	Lorraine Feather	Sheena Easton; Carlos Alazraqui; Sheryl Bernstein; John Forsythe	"He Barked, She Barked"

== Home media ==
In the 1990s, several VHS compilations were released, each with two episodes. In 2006, two volumes were released by Sony Pictures Home Entertainment, each containing four episodes. The entire series is available for digital download on iTunes. In Spring 2011, the entire series became available on YouTube through MGM Digital Media.

In December 2013, TGG Direct released All Dogs Go to Heaven: The Series - Complete Series on region 1 DVD. The 7-disc set features all 40 episodes, alongside An All Dogs Christmas Carol.

== See also ==
- List of films about angels
