= Jymn Magon =

American screenwriter (born 1949)

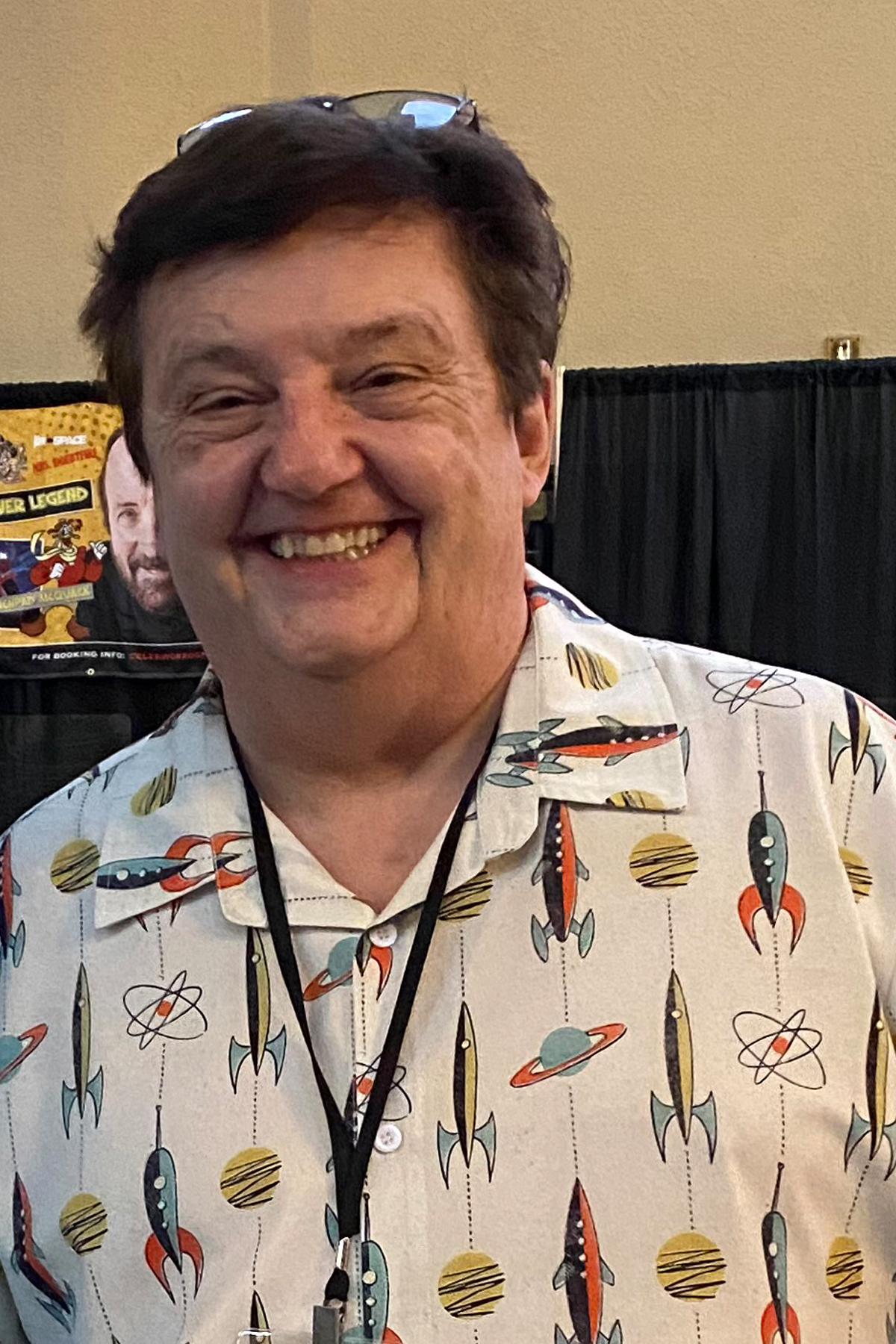
- Jymn Magon at Mouse-Con in November 2021
- Born: December 7, 1949 (age 76) Detroit, Michigan, U.S.
- Occupation: Screenwriter

Jymn Magon (/ˈdʒɪm ˈmeɪɡɒn/; born December 7, 1949) is an American television and film writer.

He was born in Detroit, Michigan. He spent 17 years at Walt Disney Studios, first producing children's records, then later moving to Disney Television Animation. He created, story edited, and wrote on such shows as Disney's Adventures of the Gummi Bears, DuckTales, Chip 'n Dale: Rescue Rangers, TaleSpin, Darkwing Duck, Goof Troop, Quack Pack and The New Adventures of Winnie the Pooh. In 1993 he began a freelance career, writing and story editing for numerous studios. His TV and film projects include A Goofy Movie, Make Way for Noddy, Casper: A Spirited Beginning, Casper Meets Wendy, Archie's Weird Mysteries and All Dogs Go to Heaven: The Series. He also writes for ads, stage, books, and comics.

He also wrote three of the episodes for Sitting Ducks: "Feather Island/King of the Bongos", "Holding Pen 13/Daredevill Ducks" and "Iced Duck/Duck Footed. While working at MGM Animation he worked as writer on MGM Sing Along Videos, The Secret of NIMH 2: Timmy to the Rescue and Tom Sawyer.

He was also a producer and creative consultant on Titanic: The Legend Goes On and the script editor on the first chapter of the 2022 indie game BROK the InvestiGator.

== Screenwriting credits ==
=== Television ===
Series head writer denoted in bold

- Adventures of the Gummi Bears (1986–1989)
- DuckTales (1987–1990)
- The New Adventures of Winnie the Pooh (1988–1991)
- The Magical World of Disney (1989)
- TaleSpin (1990–1991)
- Darkwing Duck (1991)
- Goof Troop (1992)
- Superhuman Samurai Syber Squad (1994–1995)
- Quack Pack (1996)
- The Wacky World of Tex Avery (1997)
- All Dogs Go to Heaven: The Series (1997–1998)
- Archie’s Weird Mysteries (1999–2000)
- Mickey Mouse Works (1999–2000)
- The Book of Pooh (2001)
- House of Mouse (2001)
- Make Way for Noddy (2002–2003)
- Sitting Ducks (2003)
- JoJo’s Circus (2006)
- Ben & Izzy (2007)
- Gormiti (2010)
- Maryoku Yummy (2010)
- Pac-Man and the Ghostly Adventures (2013–2015)
- Heroes of the City (2014)
- Tumble Leaf (2016)
- Filly Funtasia (2019)

=== Film ===
- A Goofy Movie (1995)
- Casper: A Spirited Beginning (1997)
- A Christmas Carol (1997)
- Casper Meets Wendy (1998)
- An All Dogs Christmas Carol (1998)
- The Secret of NIMH 2: Timmy to the Rescue (1998)
- Tom Sawyer (2000)
- Titanic: The Legend Goes On (2000)
- The Book of Pooh: Stories from the Heart (2001)
- Mickey’s House of Villains (2001)
