= Winnie the Pooh and Christmas Too =

- VHS cover
- Based on: Winnie-the-Pooh by A. A. Milne
- Written by: Karl Geurs; Mark Zaslove
- Directed by: Jamie Mitchell
- Starring: Jim Cummings; Paul Winchell; Ken Sansom; John Fiedler; Michael Gough; Edan Gross
- Music by: Steve Nelson; Thomas Richard Sharp
- Country of origin: United States
- Original language: English

Production
- Producers: Jamie Mitchell; Ken Kessel
- Editors: Lee Phillips; Simon Cruse; Rick Hinson
- Running time: 26 minutes
- Production companies: Walt Disney Television Animation; Walt Disney Animation, France S.A.; Sunwoo Animation (Korea), Co., Ltd.

Original release
- Network: ABC
- Release: December 14, 1991

Winnie the Pooh and Christmas Too is a 1991 American Christmas television special based on the Disney television series The New Adventures of Winnie the Pooh, originally broadcast on December 14, 1991, on ABC and produced by Walt Disney Animation (France), S.A. and Walt Disney Television Animation.

The special received a primetime Emmy Award nomination for Outstanding Children's Program in 1992.

== Plot ==
Two days before Christmas, Christopher Robin writes out a letter to Santa Claus for him and his friends in the Hundred Acre Wood, asking for presents; Rabbit wants a new fly swatter to stop bugs from eating carrots; Eeyore wants an umbrella to keep the snow off his house; Tigger wants a snowshoe for his tail so he can bounce on the snow without his hands and feet; Christopher Robin wants a sled "big enough for him and maybe a friend or two"; and Piglet says that Santa Claus can bring him anything.

He sends the letter off into the wind, but on Christmas Eve, Winnie the Pooh realizes, after Piglet informs him, that he did not ask anything for himself, so they search for the letter, which has not gotten very far. Afterwards, they, along with Tigger and Eeyore, go to Rabbit's house and rewrite the letter to include Pooh's present, a pot of honey. Along the way, however, they become greedy and start upgrading their desires.

Following this, Tigger, Eeyore, and Rabbit go off to get a giant Christmas tree, with help from a reluctant Gopher. Meanwhile, Pooh and Piglet go back to the point where Robin sent the letter and cast it off into the wind again. But the wind shifts southward, and the letter follows Pooh to his house. He goes to Piglet and informs him of what happened. Knowing that the rest of the gang will not get their presents as a result of this, Pooh tells Piglet they must take it into their hands to make sure the gifts are delivered.

Pooh (disguised as Santa) sneaks out and delivers Tigger, Rabbit, and Eeyore a super-bouncer barrel, a bug sprayer made from a teapot, and a mobile home made from a suitcase, respectively – or rather, handmade versions of the said items that break apart upon use. Demanding to know what is going on, the three of them corner Pooh, who says he is Santa. However, Piglet, disguised as a "sorry-lookin' reindeer", slips and makes his sled fall downhill before crashing, exposing Pooh's disguise.

After explaining what happened, Pooh tries delivering the letter to Santa himself, reasoning it would be worth missing Christmas if he could "bring Christmas" to his friends. He does not get far, though, as the wind suddenly takes the letter, so he gives up. At the Christmas tree, Pooh's friends bemoan that spending time with him at Christmas is more important than getting gifts just as Pooh reunites with them. Christopher Robin arrives with his new sled and brings them the gifts they had originally asked for. Even though Pooh does not feel like he deserves his gift due to his failure to deliver their letter, he gives Christopher Robin a hug after he urges Pooh to accept his gift as they celebrate Christmas.

== Cast ==
- Jim Cummings as Winnie the Pooh
- Paul Winchell as Tigger
- Peter Cullen as Eeyore
- John Fiedler as Piglet
- Michael Gough as Gopher
- Edan Gross as Christopher Robin
- Ken Sansom as Rabbit

== Broadcast history ==
When Winnie the Pooh and Christmas Too originally aired, it was introduced by way of a short introductory skit featuring Michael Eisner and the Disneyland walk-around versions of the Winnie the Pooh characters. The special was then accompanied by the Donald Duck cartoons The Hockey Champ and Bearly Asleep, as well as a promo for Beauty and the Beast. The special was accompanied the following year by a promo for Walt Disney Fairy Tales and The Making of The Muppet Christmas Carol. The first airing of the special ranked 53rd out of 92 shows that week, averaging a 10.8/20 rating/share, ranking second place in its first half hour behind The Golden Girls and first place in its second half hour ahead of Walter and Emily.

The special was first released on VHS on November 25, 1994. The VHS was re-released in 1997, with a sneak peek at Recess before the special. The special was broadcast on CBS in 1996. After Disney's purchase of ABC, that network once again became the home of all subsequent broadcasts until 1999. It returned for the first time on December 11, 2007, albeit in an edited-down format. The edited 2007 version aired on ABC Family (now Freeform), as part of their "25 Days of Christmas" in December 2008.

Currently, the only DVD release available is the direct-to-video release Winnie the Pooh: A Very Merry Pooh Year, where it is edited into the main feature. However, Christopher Robin's lines are re-dubbed by his voice actor in the film's main story, and Rabbit's animation is recolored to have him in his usual yellow-furred appearance (as opposed to his greenish fur in the New Adventures series). This is also the only presentation of the special on Disney+.

== Reception ==
In 2004, TV Guide ranked the special number four on its 10 Best Classic Family Holiday Shows list.

== See also ==
- List of Christmas films
