= Mark Zaslove =

American television and film writer, director, producer and novelist

Mark Zaslove is an American television and film writer, director, producer and novelist in live-action and animation. He has won two Emmy Awards and the Humanitas Prize. He has created a wide range of content from the children's show The New Adventures of Winnie the Pooh to his action thriller novel Death and Taxes.

== Early life and education ==
Zaslove is the son of the late animator Alan Zaslove. Born in Los Angeles, California, he was the third-youngest member of the Magic Castle in 1976–77, as part of Dick and Diana Zimmerman's Junior Magicians Group. He attended U.C. Berkeley to study astrophysics but left the program after two years, staying in the Bay Area for two more years while writing his first (unpublished) novel, Travail.

== Career ==
Returning to Santa Monica in 1981, Zaslove worked as a trainer at a fitness center while trying his hand at short fiction and screenplays. He joined LFP, Inc. in 1983, writing short fiction, and became Senior Editor on several of their magazines. The job lasted seven months, until he began animation screenwriting in the mid-1980s with Challenge of the GoBots and script assignments for Marvel Studios and Hanna-Barbera.

By the late 1980s, Zaslove was a staff writer for Walt Disney Television Animation, working on Disney cartoons from that era. He was chosen to develop, story edit, and co-produce The New Adventures of Winnie the Pooh. In 1987 Zaslove was a writer on the mini-series kickoff to the "DuckTales" series, Treasure of the Golden Suns. In 1990 he co-created, co-produced, and story edited TaleSpin, which became the first new series created for Disney Afternoon.

Zaslove left Disney around 1993 to start his own company, Palisades Films. In 1993 he showran the series “Cro” and developed a cartoon series for Film Roman based on the Mighty Max line of toys, named Mighty Max. He reunited with Jymn Magon in 1994 for Superhuman Samurai Syber-Squad. Other notable series co-developed by Zaslove include Bump in the Night which he story edited and co-produced, and The Legend of Calamity Jane (1997) as well as “Howdy Gaudi” (2002) and Xiaolin Chronicles (2013).

Zaslove served as a story consultant and show writer for the children's series LazyTown, produced in Iceland in the 2000s. He worked on the full-length feature realization of the Newberry Award-winning “Maniac Magee” (2003), action thrillers “Madrassa Song” (2013) and “Six Dead Dogs” (2016), as well as features for various Hyderabad studios: “5 ½ Hours to Dawn” (2001), “Little John” (2002); “Son of Alladin” (2003), “Eshan” (2006), “Lost Voyage of Sinbad” (2007), and “The Dictator of the Darkness” (2011). He is a two-time Emmy award winner and a recipient of the Humanitas Prize.

In 2018, Aperient Press published the first thriller in his new Tales of a Badass IRS Agent series, Death and Taxes.

== Screenwriting credits ==
=== Television ===
Series head writer denoted in bold

- Challenge of the GoBots (1985)
- Defenders of the Earth (1986)
- The New Adventures of Jonny Quest (1986)
- Adventures of the Gummi Bears (1987)
- DuckTales (1987)
- The New Adventures of Winnie the Pooh (1988–1989)
- TaleSpin (1990–1991)
- Bobby's World (1992)
- Taz-Mania (1992–1994)
- Bonkers (1993)
- **Cro** (1993–1994)
- **Mighty Max** (1993–1994): season 1 head writer
- Bump in the Night (1994–1995)
- **Superhuman Samurai Syber Squad** (1994–1995)
- The Legend of Calamity Jane (1997)
- All Dogs Go to Heaven: The Series (1997)
- The Wacky World of Tex Avery (1997)
- The Wacky Adventures of Ronald McDonald (1999)
- The Book of Pooh (2001)
- Jeopardy! (2001)
- Xiaolin Showdown (2004–2005)
- Loonatics Unleashed (2006–2007)
- The Secret Show (2006–2007)
- World of Quest (2008)
- Pink Panther and Pals (2010)
- Maryoku Yummy (2010)
- Secret Millionaires Club (2012–2013)
- Clay Kids (2015)
- Molly of Denali (2019–2020)

=== Film ===
- Winnie the Pooh and Christmas Too (1991)
- The Secret of Anastasia (1997)
- Seasons of Giving (1999)
- Little John (2001)
- The Book of Pooh: Stories from the Heart (2001)
- A Very Merry Pooh Year (2002)
- Maniac Magee (2003)
- Son of Aladdin (2003)
