= 1992–93 United States network television schedule (daytime) =

The following is the 1992–93 daytime network television schedule for the four major English-language commercial broadcast networks in the United States. It covers the weekday and weekend daytime hours from September 1992 to August 1993.

== Legend ==
- Light yellow indicates talk shows.
- Green indicates soap operas.
- Pink indicates game shows.
- Gold indicates news and public affairs programming.
- Light teal indicates sporting events.
- White indicates local programming.
- Light purple indicates children's programming.
- Gray indicates encore programming (e.g., reruns of prime-time programming).
- Aquamarine border indicates other programs not applicable to the above categorizations.
- New series are highlighted in **bold**.

== Schedule ==
- All times correspond to U.S. Eastern and Pacific Time scheduling (except for some live sports or events). Except where affiliates slot certain programs outside their network-dictated timeslots, subtract one hour for Central, Mountain, Alaska, and Hawaii-Aleutian times.
- Local schedules may differ, as affiliates have the option to pre-empt or delay network programs. Such scheduling may be limited to preemptions caused by local or national breaking news or weather coverage (which may force stations to tape delay certain programs in overnight timeslots or defer them to a co-operated station or digital subchannel in their regular timeslot) and any major sports events scheduled to air in a weekday timeslot (mainly during major holidays). Stations may air shows at other times at their preference.

=== Monday–Friday ===
Network		6:00 am	6:30 am	7:00 am	7:30 am	8:00 am	8:30 am	9:00 am	9:30 am	10:00 am	10:30 am	11:00 am	11:30 am	noon	12:30 pm	1:00 pm	1:30 pm	2:00 pm	2:30 pm	3:00 pm	3:30 pm	4:00 pm	4:30 pm	5:00 pm	5:30 pm	6:00 pm	6:30 pm
ABC		ABC World News This Morning		Good Morning America				Local/syndicated programming				Home		Local/syndicated programming	Loving	All My Children		One Life to Live		General Hospital		Local/syndicated programming					ABC World News Tonight with Peter Jennings
CBS		CBS Morning News		CBS This Morning				Local/syndicated programming		Family Feud Challenge		The Price is Right		Local/syndicated programming	The Young and the Restless		The Bold and the Beautiful	As the World Turns		Guiding Light		Local/syndicated programming					CBS Evening News
NBC	Fall	NBC News at Sunrise		Today				Local/syndicated programming				The Faith Daniels Show	Classic Concentration (reruns)	Local/syndicated programming	Dr. Dean	Days of Our Lives		Another World		Santa Barbara		Local/syndicated programming					NBC Nightly News with Tom Brokaw
NBC	Winter	NBC News at Sunrise		Today				Local/syndicated programming				The Faith Daniels Show	Classic Concentration (reruns)	Scrabble	**Scattergories**	Days of Our Lives		Another World		Local/syndicated programming							NBC Nightly News with Tom Brokaw
NBC	Spring	NBC News at Sunrise		Today				Local/syndicated programming				**Family Secrets**	Classic Concentration (reruns)	Scrabble	**Scattergories**	Days of Our Lives		Another World		Local/syndicated programming							NBC Nightly News with Tom Brokaw
NBC	Summer	NBC News at Sunrise		Today				Local/syndicated programming				**John and Leeza from Hollywood**		Classic Concentration (reruns)	**Caesars Challenge**	Days of Our Lives		Another World		Local/syndicated programming							NBC Nightly News with Tom Brokaw
Fox	Early Fall (September 7)	Local/syndicated programming			Jim Henson's Muppet Babies (reruns)	Fox's Peter Pan & the Pirates (reruns)	Local/syndicated programming													Beetlejuice (reruns)	Tom & Jerry Kids	Tom & Jerry Kids (Mon.); George of the Jungle (Tue.); **Super Dave: Daredevil for Hire** (Wed.); Bobby’s World (Thu.); **Eek! the Cat** (Fri.)	**Batman: The Animated Series**	Local/syndicated programming			
Fox	Mid-Fall (starting September 14)	Local/syndicated programming			Beetlejuice (reruns)	Alvin and the Chipmunks (reruns)	Local/syndicated programming													Merrie Melodies Starring Bugs Bunny & Friends	Tom & Jerry Kids	**Tiny Toon Adventures**	**Batman: The Animated Series**	Local/syndicated programming			

ABC note: After ABC cut Home back to one hour, giving the noon/11am timeslot back to local stations, Loving became available to affiliates at noon/11am CT/PT to allow stations to air newscasts in the 11:30am timeslot in the Central, Mountain and Pacific time zones.

NBC note: Santa Barbara aired its final episode on January 15, 1993. The following Monday, NBC returned the 3 pm timeslot to its local stations. Many affiliates had already dropped the show by the time it was canceled. In exchange, NBC took back the 12:00 p.m. timeslot from its local stations. Many affiliates did not air network programming in the 12:00 p.m. timeslot, opting to air local news or other programming.

CBS note: CBS returned the 10 am hour to its affiliates beginning September 13.

=== Saturday ===
Network		7:00 am	7:30 am	8:00 am	8:30 am	9:00 am	9:30 am	10:00 am	10:30 am	11:00 am	11:30 am	noon	12:30 pm	1:00 pm	1:30 pm	2:00 pm	2:30 pm	3:00 pm	3:30 pm	4:00 pm	4:30 pm	5:00 pm	5:30 pm	6:00 pm	6:30 pm
ABC	Fall	Local and/or syndicated programming		The New Adventures of Winnie the Pooh (R)	Land of the Lost	**Wild West C.O.W.-Boys of Moo Mesa**	Darkwing Duck	**Goof Troop**	**The Addams Family**	The Bugs Bunny and Tweety Show / Schoolhouse Rock! (11:56AM)		A Pup Named Scooby-Doo (R)	ABC Weekend Special	College Football on ABC											
ABC	Spring	Local and/or syndicated programming		A Pup Named Scooby-Doo (R)	Wild West C.O.W.-Boys of Moo Mesa	Goof Troop	The Addams Family	The Bugs Bunny and Tweety Show / Schoolhouse Rock! (10:56AM)		Land of the Lost	Darkwing Duck	The New Adventures of Winnie the Pooh (R)	ABC Weekend Special	ABC Sports and/or local programming										Local news	ABC World News Saturday
CBS	Fall	Local and/or syndicated programming		**Fievel's American Tails**	**The Little Mermaid**	Garfield and Friends		Teenage Mutant Ninja Turtles		Back to the Future	**Raw Toonage**	**The Amazing Live Sea Monkeys**	Grimmy	CBS Sports and/or local programming										Local news	CBS Evening News
CBS	Spring	Local and/or syndicated programming		**Fievel's American Tails**	**The Little Mermaid**	Garfield and Friends		Teenage Mutant Ninja Turtles		**Cyber C.O.P.S.**	**Raw Toonage**	**The Amazing Live Sea Monkeys**	Back to the Future	CBS Sports and/or local programming										Local news	CBS Evening News
NBC	Fall	Local and/or syndicated programming		Saturday Today				Saved by the Bell	**California Dreams**	Saved by the Bell	**Name Your Adventure**	**Double Up**	NBC Sports and/or local programming					NBC Sports programming						Local news	NBC Nightly News
NBC	October	Local and/or syndicated programming		Saturday Today				Saved by the Bell	**California Dreams**	Saved by the Bell	**Name Your Adventure**	NBA Inside Stuff	NBC Sports and/or local programming					NBC Sports programming						Local news	NBC Nightly News
NBC	Summer	Local and/or syndicated programming		Saturday Today				Saved by the Bell	**California Dreams**	Saved by the Bell	**Name Your Adventure**	**Brains and Brawn**	NBC Sports and/or local programming					NBC Sports programming						Local news	NBC Nightly News
Fox	Fall	Local and/or syndicated programming		**Jim Henson's Dog City**	Bobby's World	Tom & Jerry Kids	Taz-Mania	**The Plucky Duck Show**	**Eek! The Cat**	**Super Dave: Daredevil for Hire**	George of the Jungle / Specials	Local and/or syndicated programming													
Fox	November	Local and/or syndicated programming		**Jim Henson's Dog City**	Bobby's World	Tom & Jerry Kids	Eek! The Cat	Tiny Toon Adventures	Taz-Mania	Mighty Mouse: The New Adventures (R)	Super Dave: Daredevil for Hire	Local and/or syndicated programming													
Fox	January	Local and/or syndicated programming		**Jim Henson's Dog City**	Bobby's World	Tom & Jerry Kids	Eek! The Cat	Tiny Toon Adventures	Taz-Mania	**X-Men**	Super Dave: Daredevil for Hire	Local and/or syndicated programming													

=== Sunday ===
Network		7:00 am	7:30 am	8:00 am	8:30 am	9:00 am	9:30 am	10:00 am	10:30 am	11:00 am	11:30 am	noon	12:30 pm	1:00 pm	1:30 pm	2:00 pm	2:30 pm	3:00 pm	3:30 pm	4:00 pm	4:30 pm	5:00 pm	5:30 pm	6:00 pm	6:30 pm
ABC	Fall	Local and/or syndicated programming				This Week with David Brinkley		Local and/or syndicated programming		ABC Sports and/or local programming														Local news	ABC World News Sunday
ABC	Winter	Local and/or syndicated programming		**Good Morning America Sunday**		This Week with David Brinkley		Local and/or syndicated programming		ABC Sports and/or local programming														Local news	ABC World News Sunday
CBS	Fall	Local and/or syndicated programming				CBS News Sunday Morning			Face the Nation	Local and/or syndicated programming		The NFL Today	NFL on CBS and/or local programming												
CBS	Mid-winter	Local and/or syndicated programming				CBS News Sunday Morning			Face the Nation	Local and/or syndicated programming		CBS Sports and/or local programming												Local news	CBS Evening News
NBC	Fall	Local and/or syndicated programming		Sunday Today		Meet the Press		Local and/or syndicated programming				NFL Live!	NFL on NBC												
NBC	Mid-winter	Local and/or syndicated programming		Sunday Today		Meet the Press		Local and/or syndicated programming				NBC Sports and/or local programming												Local news	NBC Nightly News

== By network ==
=== ABC ===
Returning series:

- ABC Weekend Special
- ABC World News This Morning
- ABC World News Tonight with Peter Jennings
- All My Children
- The Bugs Bunny and Tweety Show
- Darkwing Duck
- General Hospital
- Good Morning America
- Home
- Land of the Lost
- Loving
- The New Adventures of Winnie the Pooh (reruns)
- One Life to Live
- A Pup Named Scooby-Doo (reruns)
- Schoolhouse Rock! (reruns)
- This Week with David Brinkley

New series:

- **The Addams Family**
- **Good Morning America Sunday**
- **Goof Troop**
- **Wild West C.O.W.-Boys of Moo Mesa**

Not returning from 1991-92:

- Beetlejuice
- Hammerman
- The Pirates of Dark Water
- Slimer! and the Real Ghostbusters

=== CBS ===
Returning series:

- As the World Turns
- Back to the Future
- The Bold and the Beautiful
- CBS Evening News
- CBS Morning News
- CBS News Sunday Morning
- CBS This Morning
- Face the Nation
- Family Feud Challenge
- Garfield and Friends
- Guiding Light
- Mother Goose and Grimm (retitled Grimmy)
- The Price Is Right
- Teenage Mutant Ninja Turtles
- The Young and the Restless

New series:

- **The Amazing Live Sea Monkeys**
- **Cyber C.O.P.S.**
- **The Little Mermaid**
- **Raw Toonage**
- **Fievel's American Tails**

Not returning from 1991-92:

- Designing Women (reruns)
- Family Feud continued in syndication
- Inspector Gadget (reruns)
- Jim Henson's Muppet Babies
- Riders in the Sky
- Where's Waldo?

=== Fox ===
Returning series:

- Fox Kids Network
  - Alvin and the Chipmunks (reruns)
  - Beetlejuice (reruns)
  - Bobby's World
  - George of the Jungle (reruns)
  - Merrie Melodies Starring Bugs Bunny & Friends
  - Mighty Mouse: The New Adventures (reruns)
  - Taz-Mania
  - Tiny Toon Adventures
  - Tom & Jerry Kids

New series:

- Fox Kids Network
  - **Batman: The Animated Series**
  - **Dog City**
  - **Eek! The Cat**
  - **The Plucky Duck Show**
  - **Super Dave: Daredevil for Hire**
  - **X-Men**

Not returning from 1991-92:

- Fox Kids Network
  - Attack of the Killer Tomatoes
  - Bill & Ted's Excellent Adventures
  - Jim Henson's Muppet Babies (reruns)
  - Little Dracula (limited series)
  - Little Shop
  - Fox's Peter Pan & the Pirates

=== NBC ===
Returning series:

- Another World
- Classic Concentration (reruns)
- Days of Our Lives
- Dr. Dean
- The Faith Daniels Show
- Meet the Press
- NBA Inside Stuff
- NBC News at Sunrise
- NBC Nightly News
- Santa Barbara
- Saturday Today
- Saved by the Bell
- Scrabble
- Sunday Today
- Today

New series:

- **Caesars Challenge**
- **Family Secrets**
- **John and Leeza from Hollywood**
- **Scattergories**
- **TNBC**
  - **Brains and Brawn**
  - **California Dreams**
  - **Double Up**
  - **Name Your Adventure**

Not returning from 1991-92:

- Captain N: The Game Master
- Chip and Pepper's Cartoon Madness
- A Closer Look
- One on One with John Tesh
- ProStars
- Saturday Morning Videos
- Space Cats
- Super Mario World
- Wish Kid
- Yo Yogi!

== See also ==
- 1992-93 United States network television schedule (prime-time)
- 1992-93 United States network television schedule (late night)

== Sources ==
- https://web.archive.org/web/20071015122215/http://curtalliaume.com/abc_day.html
- https://web.archive.org/web/20071015122235/http://curtalliaume.com/cbs_day.html
- https://web.archive.org/web/20071012211242/http://curtalliaume.com/nbc_day.html
- https://kidsblockblog.wordpress.com/2012/10/25/fox-kids-weekday-lineups-1990-1993/
