= 1993–94 United States network television schedule (daytime) =

The following is the 1993–94 daytime network television schedule for the four major English-language commercial broadcast networks in the United States. It covers the weekday and weekend daytime hours from September 1993 to August 1994.

== Legend ==
- Light yellow indicates talk shows.
- Green indicates soap operas.
- Pink indicates game shows.
- Gold indicates news and public affairs programming.
- Light teal indicates sporting events.
- White indicates local programming.
- Light purple indicates children's programming.
- Gray indicates encore programming (e.g., reruns of prime-time programming).
- Aquamarine indicates other programs not applicable to the above categorizations.
- New series are highlighted in **bold**.

== Schedule ==
- All times correspond to U.S. Eastern and Pacific Time scheduling (except for some live sports or events). Except where affiliates slot certain programs outside their network-dictated timeslots, subtract one hour for Central, Mountain, Alaska, and Hawaii-Aleutian times.
- Local schedules may differ, as affiliates have the option to pre-empt or delay network programs. Such scheduling may be limited to preemptions caused by local or national breaking news or weather coverage (which may force stations to tape delay certain programs in overnight timeslots or defer them to a co-operated station or digital subchannel in their regular timeslot) and any major sports events scheduled to air in a weekday timeslot (mainly during major holidays). Stations may air shows at other times at their preference.

=== Monday–Friday ===
Network		6:00 am	6:30 am	7:00 am	7:30 am	8:00 am	8:30 am	9:00 am	9:30 am	10:00 am	10:30 am	11:00 am	11:30 am	noon	12:30 pm	1:00 pm	1:30 pm	2:00 pm	2:30 pm	3:00 pm	3:30 pm	4:00 pm	4:30 pm	5:00 pm	5:30 pm	6:00 pm	6:30 pm
ABC	Fall	ABC World News This Morning		Good Morning America				Local/syndicated programming				Home		Local/syndicated programming	Loving	All My Children		One Life to Live		General Hospital		Local/syndicated programming					ABC World News Tonight with Peter Jennings
ABC	April	ABC World News This Morning		Good Morning America				Local/syndicated programming				**Mike and Maty**		Local/syndicated programming	Loving	All My Children		One Life to Live		General Hospital		Local/syndicated programming					ABC World News Tonight with Peter Jennings
CBS		CBS Morning News		CBS This Morning				Local/syndicated programming				The Price Is Right		Local/syndicated programming	The Young and the Restless		The Bold and the Beautiful	As the World Turns		Guiding Light		Local/syndicated programming					CBS Evening News
NBC	Fall	NBC News at Sunrise		Today				Local/syndicated programming				John and Leeza from Hollywood		Classic Concentration (reruns)	Caesars Challenge	Days of Our Lives		Another World		Local/syndicated programming							NBC Nightly News with Tom Brokaw
NBC	Winter	NBC News at Sunrise		Today				Local/syndicated programming		Leeza		**The Jane Whitney Show**		Local/syndicated programming		Days of Our Lives		Another World		Local/syndicated programming							NBC Nightly News with Tom Brokaw
Fox	Fall	Local/syndicated programming			**Mighty Morphin Power Rangers**	Merrie Melodies Starring Bugs Bunny & Friends	Local/syndicated programming													Tom & Jerry Kids / Bobby's World (March 14–18)	Tiny Toon Adventures	**Animaniacs**	Batman: The Animated Series	Local/syndicated programming			
Fox	August	Local/syndicated programming			**Mighty Morphin Power Rangers**	Merrie Melodies Starring Bugs Bunny & Friends	Local/syndicated programming													Droopy, Master Detective	Tiny Toon Adventures	**Animaniacs**	Batman: The Animated Series	Local/syndicated programming			

=== Saturday ===
Network		7:00 am	7:30 am	8:00 am	8:30 am	9:00 am	9:30 am	10:00 am	10:30 am	11:00 am	11:30 am	noon	12:30 pm	1:00 pm	1:30 pm	2:00 pm	2:30 pm	3:00 pm	3:30 pm	4:00 pm	4:30 pm	5:00 pm	5:30 pm	6:00 pm	6:30 pm
ABC	Fall	Local and/or syndicated programming		**Cro**	Wild West C.O.W.-Boys of Moo Mesa	**Sonic the Hedgehog**	The Addams Family	**Tales from the Cryptkeeper**	The Bugs Bunny and Tweety Show / Schoolhouse Rock! (11:26AM)		**CityKids**	Land of the Lost (R)	ABC Weekend Special	College Football on ABC											
ABC	Spring	Local and/or syndicated programming		The Bugs Bunny and Tweety Show / Schoolhouse Rock! (8:56AM)		**Sonic the Hedgehog**	The Addams Family	**Tales from the Cryptkeeper**	CityKids	Land of the Lost (R)	Wild West C.O.W.-Boys of Moo Mesa	Cro	ABC Weekend Special	ABC Sports and/or local programming										Local news	ABC World News Saturday
CBS	Fall	Local and/or syndicated programming		**Marsupilami**	The Little Mermaid	Garfield and Friends		**All-New Dennis the Menace**	Teenage Mutant Ninja Turtles		**Cadillacs and Dinosaurs**	**Beakman's World**	CBS Storybreak	CBS Sports and/or local programming										Local news	CBS Evening News
CBS	November	Local and/or syndicated programming		**Marsupilami**	The Little Mermaid	Garfield and Friends		Teenage Mutant Ninja Turtles		All-New Dennis the Menace	**Cadillacs and Dinosaurs**	**Beakman's World**	CBS Storybreak	CBS Sports and/or local programming										Local news	CBS Evening News
CBS	Spring	Local and/or syndicated programming		**Marsupilami**	The Little Mermaid	Garfield and Friends		Teenage Mutant Ninja Turtles		All-New Dennis the Menace	**Conan and the Young Warriors**	**Beakman's World**	CBS Storybreak	CBS Sports and/or local programming										Local news	CBS Evening News
NBC	Fall	Local and/or syndicated programming		Saturday Today				Name Your Adventure	California Dreams	**Saved by the Bell: The New Class**	**Running the Halls**	Brains and Brawn	NBC Sports and/or local programming					NBC Sports programming						Local news	NBC Nightly News
NBC	October	Local and/or syndicated programming		Saturday Today				Name Your Adventure	California Dreams	**Saved by the Bell: The New Class**	**Running the Halls**	NBA Inside Stuff	NBC Sports and/or local programming					NBC Sports programming						Local news	NBC Nightly News
Fox	Fall	Local and/or syndicated programming		Jim Henson's Dog City	Bobby's World	**Droopy, Master Detective**	Eek! The Cat	Tiny Toon Adventures	Taz-Mania	X-Men	**Mighty Morphin Power Rangers**	Local and/or syndicated programming													
Fox	November	Local and/or syndicated programming		Jim Henson's Dog City	Droopy, Master Detective	Bobby's World	Eek! and the **Terrible Thunderlizards**	Tiny Toon Adventures	Taz-Mania	X-Men	**Mighty Morphin Power Rangers**	Local and/or syndicated programming													
Fox	January	Local and/or syndicated programming		Jim Henson's Dog City	Droopy, Master Detective	Bobby's World	Eek! and the **Terrible Thunderlizards**	Tiny Toon Adventures	Taz-Mania	X-Men	The Terrible Thunderlizards	Local and/or syndicated programming													
Fox	February	Local and/or syndicated programming		Jim Henson's Dog City	Mighty Morphin Power Rangers	Bobby's World	Eek! and the **Terrible Thunderlizards**	Tiny Toon Adventures	Taz-Mania	X-Men	**Where on Earth Is Carmen Sandiego?**	Local and/or syndicated programming													
Fox	July	Local and/or syndicated programming		Jim Henson's Dog City	**Thunderbirds USA**	Bobby's World	Eek! and the **Terrible Thunderlizards**	Tiny Toon Adventures	Taz-Mania	X-Men	**Where on Earth Is Carmen Sandiego?**	Local and/or syndicated programming													

=== Sunday ===
Network		7:00 am	7:30 am	8:00 am	8:30 am	9:00 am	9:30 am	10:00 am	10:30 am	11:00 am	11:30 am	noon	12:30 pm	1:00 pm	1:30 pm	2:00 pm	2:30 pm	3:00 pm	3:30 pm	4:00 pm	4:30 pm	5:00 pm	5:30 pm	6:00 pm	6:30 pm
ABC		Local and/or syndicated programming		Good Morning America Sunday		This Week with David Brinkley		Local and/or syndicated programming		ABC Sports and/or local programming														Local news	ABC World News Sunday
CBS	Fall	Local and/or syndicated programming				CBS News Sunday Morning			Face the Nation	Local and/or syndicated programming		The NFL Today	NFL on CBS and/or local programming												
CBS	Mid-winter	Local and/or syndicated programming				CBS News Sunday Morning			Face the Nation	Local and/or syndicated programming		CBS Sports and/or local programming												Local news	CBS Evening News
NBC	Fall	Local and/or syndicated programming		Sunday Today		Meet the Press		Local and/or syndicated programming				NFL Live!	NFL on NBC												
NBC	Mid-winter	Local and/or syndicated programming		Sunday Today		Meet the Press		Local and/or syndicated programming				NBC Sports and/or local programming												Local news	NBC Nightly News

== By network ==
=== ABC ===
Returning series:

- ABC Weekend Special
- ABC World News This Morning
- ABC World News Tonight with Peter Jennings
- The Addams Family
- All My Children
- The Bugs Bunny and Tweety Show
- General Hospital
- Good Morning America
- Good Morning America Sunday
- The Home Show
- Land of the Lost (reruns)
- Loving
- One Life to Live
- Schoolhouse Rock!
- This Week with David Brinkley
- Wild West C.O.W.-Boys of Moo Mesa

New series:

- **CityKids**
- **Cro**
- **Mike and Maty**
- **Sonic the Hedgehog**
- **Tales from the Cryptkeeper**

Not returning from 1992-93:

- Darkwing Duck
- Goof Troop
- A Pup Named Scooby-Doo (reruns)

=== CBS ===
Returning series:

- As the World Turns
- The Bold and the Beautiful
- CBS Evening News
- CBS Morning News
- CBS News Sunday Morning
- CBS Storybreak (reruns)
- CBS This Morning
- The Little Mermaid
- Face the Nation
- Garfield and Friends
- Guiding Light
- The Price Is Right
- Teenage Mutant Ninja Turtles
- The Young and the Restless

New series:

- **All-New Dennis the Menace**
- **Beakman's World**
- **Cadillacs and Dinosaurs**
- **Conan and the Young Warriors**
- **Marsupilami**

Not returning from 1992-93:

- The Amazing Live Sea Monkeys
- Back to the Future
- Cyber C.O.P.S.
- Family Feud Challenge
- Raw Toonage
- Fievel's American Tails
- Grimmy

=== Fox ===
Returning series:

- Fox Kids Network
  - Batman: The Animated Series
  - Bobby's World
  - Dog City
  - Eek! The Cat
  - Merrie Melodies Starring Bugs Bunny & Friends
  - Taz-Mania
  - Tiny Toon Adventures (reruns)
  - Tom & Jerry Kids
  - X-Men

New series:

- Fox Kids Network
  - **Animaniacs**
  - **Droopy, Master Detective**
  - **Mighty Morphin Power Rangers**
  - **The Terrible Thunderlizards**
  - **Thunderbirds USA**
  - **Where on Earth Is Carmen Sandiego?**

Not returning from 1992-93:

- Fox Kids Network
  - Alvin and the Chipmunks (reruns)
  - Beetlejuice (reruns)
  - George of the Jungle (reruns)
  - Mighty Mouse: The New Adventures (reruns)
  - The Plucky Duck Show
  - Super Dave: Daredevil for Hire

=== NBC ===
Returning series:

- Another World
- Caesars Challenge
- Classic Concentration (reruns)
- Days of Our Lives
- John and Leeza from Hollywood (retitled Leeza)
- Meet the Press
- NBC News at Sunrise
- NBC Nightly News
- Saturday Today
- Sunday Today
- Today
- TNBC
  - Brains and Brawn
  - California Dreams
  - Name Your Adventure
  - NBA Inside Stuff

New series:

- **The Jane Whitney Show**
- TNBC
  - **Running the Halls**
  - **Saved by the Bell: The New Class**

Not returning from 1992-93:

- Dr. Dean
- The Faith Daniels Show
- Family Secrets
- Santa Barbara
- Saved by the Bell
- Scattergories
- Scrabble
- TNBC
  - Double Up

== See also ==
- 1993-94 United States network television schedule (prime-time)
- 1993-94 United States network television schedule (late night)

== Sources ==
- https://web.archive.org/web/20071015122215/http://curtalliaume.com/abc_day.html
- https://web.archive.org/web/20071015122235/http://curtalliaume.com/cbs_day.html
- https://web.archive.org/web/20071012211242/http://curtalliaume.com/nbc_day.html
