= 1991–92 United States network television schedule (daytime) =

The following is the 1991–92 daytime network television schedule for the four major English-language commercial broadcast networks in the United States. It covers the weekday and weekend daytime hours from September 1991 to August 1992. The schedule is followed by a list per network of returning series, new series, and series canceled after the 1990–91 season.

== Legend ==
- Light yellow indicates talk shows.
- Green indicates soap operas.
- Pink indicates game shows.
- Gold indicates news and public affairs programming.
- Light teal indicates sporting events.
- White indicates local programming.
- Light purple indicates children's programming.
- Gray indicates encore programming (e.g., reruns of prime-time programming).
- New series are highlighted in **bold**.

== Schedule ==
- All times correspond to U.S. Eastern and Pacific Time scheduling (except for some live sports or events). Except where affiliates slot certain programs outside their network-dictated timeslots, subtract one hour for Central, Mountain, Alaska, and Hawaii-Aleutian times.
- Local schedules may differ, as affiliates have the option to pre-empt or delay network programs. Such scheduling may be limited to preemptions caused by local or national breaking news or weather coverage (which may force stations to tape delay certain programs in overnight timeslots or defer them to a co-operated station or digital subchannel in their regular timeslot) and any major sports events scheduled to air in a weekday timeslot (mainly during major holidays). Stations may air shows at other times at their preference.

=== Monday–Friday ===
| Network | | 6:00 am | 6:30 am | 7:00 am | 7:30 am | 8:00 am | 8:30 am | 9:00 am | 9:30 am | 10:00 am | 10:30 am | 11:00 am | 11:30 am | noon | 12:30 pm | 1:00 pm | 1:30 pm | 2:00 pm | 2:30 pm | 3:00 pm | 3:30 pm | 4:00 pm | 4:30 pm | 5:00 pm | 5:30 pm | 6:00 pm | 6:30 pm |
|---|---|---|---|---|---|---|---|---|---|---|---|---|---|---|---|---|---|---|---|---|---|---|---|---|---|---|---|
| ABC | | ABC World News This Morning | | Good Morning America | | | | Local/syndicated programming | | | | Home | | | Loving | All My Children | | One Life to Live | | General Hospital | | Local/syndicated programming | | | | | ABC World News Tonight with Peter Jennings |
| CBS | Fall | CBS Morning News | | CBS This Morning | | | | Local/syndicated programming | | Designing Women | Family Feud | The Price Is Right | | Local/syndicated programming | The Young and the Restless | | The Bold and the Beautiful | As the World Turns | | Guiding Light | | Local/syndicated programming | | | | | CBS Evening News with Dan Rather |
| CBS | Summer | CBS Morning News | | CBS This Morning | | | | Local/syndicated programming | | **Family Feud Challenge** | | The Price Is Right | | Local/syndicated programming | The Young and the Restless | | The Bold and the Beautiful | As the World Turns | | Guiding Light | | Local/syndicated programming | | | | | CBS Evening News with Dan Rather |
| NBC | Fall | NBC News at Sunrise | | Today | | | | Local/syndicated programming | | | | **One on One with John Tesh** | Classic Concentration (R) | Local/syndicated programming | A Closer Look | Days of Our Lives | | Another World | | Santa Barbara | | Local/syndicated programming | | | | | NBC Nightly News with Tom Brokaw |
| NBC | Summer | NBC News at Sunrise | | Today | | | | Local/syndicated programming | | | | **The Faith Daniels Show** | Classic Concentration (R) | Local/syndicated programming | **Dr. Dean** | Days of Our Lives | | Another World | | Santa Barbara | | Local/syndicated programming | | | | | NBC Nightly News with Tom Brokaw |
| Fox | Early September (September 2) | Local/syndicated programming | | | | | | | | | | | | | | | | | | | | | Fox's Peter Pan & the Pirates (Mon.); **Little Dracula** (Tue.-Fri.) | Local/syndicated programming | | | |
| Fox | Mid-September (September 9) | Local/syndicated programming | | | Jim Henson's Muppet Babies (R) | Fox's Peter Pan & the Pirates / Little Dracula (Halloween) | Local/syndicated programming | | | | | | | | | | | | | | | **Beetlejuice** | Local/syndicated programming | | | | |

ABC note: ABC rescinded the noon time slot to affiliates on August 17. Many ABC affiliates preempted network programming to air local news in the noon time slot. Loving was now available to affiliates at noon/11:00 CT or 12:30/11:30 CT.

=== Saturday ===
| Network | | 7:00 am | 7:30 am | 8:00 am | 8:30 am | 9:00 am | 9:30 am | 10:00 am | 10:30 am | 11:00 am | 11:30 am | noon | 12:30 pm | 1:00 pm | 1:30 pm | 2:00 pm | 2:30 pm | 3:00 pm | 3:30 pm | 4:00 pm | 4:30 pm | 5:00 pm | 5:30 pm | 6:00 pm | 6:30 pm |
|---|---|---|---|---|---|---|---|---|---|---|---|---|---|---|---|---|---|---|---|---|---|---|---|---|---|
| ABC | Fall | Local and/or syndicated programming | | The New Adventures of Winnie the Pooh | **Land of the Lost** | **Darkwing Duck** | Beetlejuice | **Hammerman** | **The Pirates of Dark Water** | The Bugs Bunny and Tweety Show | | Slimer! and The Real Ghostbusters | ABC Weekend Special | College Football on ABC | | | | | | | | | | | |
| ABC | Winter | Local and/or syndicated programming | | The New Adventures of Winnie the Pooh | **Land of the Lost** | **Darkwing Duck** | Beetlejuice | Slimer! and the Real Ghostbusters | **The Pirates of Dark Water** | The Bugs Bunny and Tweety Show | | Hammerman | ABC Weekend Special | ABC Sports and/or local programming | | | | | | | | | | Local news | ABC World News Saturday |
| CBS | Fall | Local and/or syndicated programming | | **Riders in the Sky** | **Mother Goose and Grimm** | Garfield and Friends | | Teenage Mutant Ninja Turtles | | **Back to the Future** | **Where's Waldo?** | Jim Henson's Muppet Babies | CBS Storybreak | CBS Sports and/or local programming | | | | | | | | | | Local news | CBS Evening News |
| CBS | October | Local and/or syndicated programming | | Jim Henson's Muppet Babies | **Mother Goose and Grimm** | Garfield and Friends | | Teenage Mutant Ninja Turtles | | **Back to the Future** | **Where's Waldo?** | Riders in the Sky | CBS Storybreak | CBS Sports and/or local programming | | | | | | | | | | Local news | CBS Evening News |
| CBS | Winter | Local and/or syndicated programming | | Jim Henson's Muppet Babies | **Mother Goose and Grimm** | Garfield and Friends | | Teenage Mutant Ninja Turtles | | **Back to the Future** | **Where's Waldo?** | **Inspector Gadget** (R) | Riders in the Sky | CBS Sports and/or local programming | | | | | | | | | | Local news | CBS Evening News |
| NBC | Fall | Local and/or syndicated programming | | **Chip and Pepper's Cartoon Madness** | **Yo Yogi!** | Captain N and the New **Super Mario World** | **ProStars** | **Wish Kid** | **Space Cats** | Saved by the Bell | | Saturday Morning Videos | NBC Sports and/or local programming | | | | | NBC Sports programming | | | | | | Local news | NBC Nightly News |
| NBC | October | Local and/or syndicated programming | | Space Cats | **Yo Yogi!** | Captain N and the New **Super Mario World** | **ProStars** | **Wish Kid** | Chip and Pepper's Cartoon Madness | Saved by the Bell | | NBA Inside Stuff | NBC Sports and/or local programming | | | | | NBC Sports programming | | | | | | Local news | NBC Nightly News |
| NBC | July | Local and/or syndicated programming | | Space Cats | **Yo Yogi!** | Captain N and the New **Super Mario World** | **ProStars** | **Wish Kid** | Chip and Pepper's Cartoon Madness | Saved by the Bell | | Saturday Morning Videos | NBC Sports and/or local programming | | | | | NBC Sports programming | | | | | | Local news | NBC Nightly News |
| NBC | August | Local and/or syndicated programming | | **Saturday Today** | | | | Saved by the Bell | Wish Kid | Saved by the Bell | | Saturday Morning Videos | NBC Sports and/or local programming | | | | | NBC Sports programming | | | | | | Local news | NBC Nightly News |
| Fox | Fall | Local and/or syndicated programming | | Attack of the Killer Tomatoes | Bobby's World | Tom & Jerry Kids | **Taz-Mania** | **Little Shop** | **Bill & Ted's Excellent Adventures** | Local and/or syndicated programming | | | | | | | | | | | | | | | |
| Fox | October | Local and/or syndicated programming | | Attack of the Killer Tomatoes | Bobby's World | Tom & Jerry Kids | **Taz-Mania** | Bill & Ted's Excellent Adventures | Little Shop | Local and/or syndicated programming | | | | | | | | | | | | | | | |

NBC note: This marked the final season of NBC airing children's animated programming on Saturday mornings due to the network's decision to forego cartoons the next season in favor of the Saturday edition of The Today Show and the live action teen sitcom-focused banner TNBC, which lasted for a decade on the network.

=== Sunday ===
| Network | | 7:00 am | 7:30 am | 8:00 am | 8:30 am | 9:00 am | 9:30 am | 10:00 am | 10:30 am | 11:00 am | 11:30 am | noon | 12:30 pm | 1:00 pm | 1:30 pm | 2:00 pm | 2:30 pm | 3:00 pm | 3:30 pm | 4:00 pm | 4:30 pm | 5:00 pm | 5:30 pm | 6:00 pm | 6:30 pm |
|---|---|---|---|---|---|---|---|---|---|---|---|---|---|---|---|---|---|---|---|---|---|---|---|---|---|
| ABC | | Local and/or syndicated programming | | | | | | This Week with David Brinkley | | ABC Sports and/or local programming | | | | | | | | | | | | | | Local news | ABC World News Sunday |
| CBS | Fall | Local and/or syndicated programming | | | | CBS News Sunday Morning | | | Face the Nation | Local and/or syndicated programming | | The NFL Today | NFL on CBS and/or local programming | | | | | | | | | | | | |
| CBS | Mid-winter | Local and/or syndicated programming | | | | CBS News Sunday Morning | | | Face the Nation | Local and/or syndicated programming | | CBS Sports and/or local programming | | | | | | | | | | | | Local news | CBS Evening News |
| NBC | Fall | Local and/or syndicated programming | | Sunday Today | | | Meet the Press | Local and/or syndicated programming | | | | NFL Live! | NFL on NBC | | | | | | | | | | | | |
| NBC | Mid-winter | Local and/or syndicated programming | | Sunday Today | | | Meet the Press | Local and/or syndicated programming | | | | NBC Sports and/or local programming | | | | | | | | | | | | Local news | NBC Nightly News |

== By network ==
=== ABC ===
Returning series:

- ABC Weekend Special
- ABC World News This Morning
- ABC World News Tonight with Peter Jennings
- All My Children
- Beetlejuice
- The Bugs Bunny and Tweety Show
- General Hospital
- Good Morning America
- The Home Show
- Loving
- The New Adventures of Winnie the Pooh
- One Life to Live
- Slimer! and the Real Ghostbusters
- This Week with David Brinkley

New series:

- **Darkwing Duck**
- **Hammerman**
- **Land of the Lost**
- **The Pirates of Dark Water**

Not returning from 1990–91:

- Little Rosey
- Match Game
- New Kids on the Block
- A Pup Named Scooby-Doo
- The Wizard of Oz

=== CBS ===
Returning series:

- As the World Turns
- The Bold and the Beautiful
- CBS Evening News
- CBS Morning News
- CBS News Sunday Morning
- CBS Storybreak (reruns)
- CBS This Morning
- Designing Women (reruns)
- Face the Nation
- Family Feud
- Garfield and Friends
- Guiding Light
- Jim Henson's Muppet Babies
- The Price Is Right
- Teenage Mutant Ninja Turtles
- The Young and the Restless

New series:

- **Back to the Future**
- **Family Feud Challenge**
- **Inspector Gadget** (reruns)
- **Mother Goose and Grimm**
- **Riders in the Sky**
- **Where's Waldo?**

Not returning from 1990–91:

- The Adventures of Raggedy Ann and Andy (reruns)
- The Barbara DeAngelis Show
- Bill and Ted's Excellent Adventures (moved to Fox Kids Network)
- Dink, the Little Dinosaur
- Pee-wee's Playhouse
- Soap Star Family Feud
- Wheel of Fortune

=== Fox ===
Returning series:

- Fox Kids Network
  - Attack of the Killer Tomatoes
  - Beetlejuice
  - Bill & Ted's Excellent Adventures (Moved from CBS)
  - Bobby's World
  - Fox's Peter Pan & the Pirates
  - Tom & Jerry Kids Show (retitled Tom & Jerry Kids)

New series:

- Fox Kids Network
  - **Jim Henson's Muppet Babies** (reruns)
  - **Little Dracula** (limited series)
  - **Little Shop**
  - **Taz-Mania**

Not returning from 1990-91:

- Fox Kids Network
  - Fox's Fun House
  - Piggsburg Pigs
  - Swamp Thing
  - Zazoo U

=== NBC ===
Returning series:

- Another World
- Captain N: The Game Master
- A Closer Look/The Faith Daniels Show
- Classic Concentration (reruns)
- Days of Our Lives
- Meet the Press
- NBA Inside Stuff
- NBC News at Sunrise
- NBC Nightly News
- Santa Barbara
- Saturday Morning Videos
- Saved by the Bell
- Sunday Today
- Today

New series:

- **Chip and Pepper's Cartoon Madness**
- **Dr. Dean**
- **One on One with John Tesh**
- **ProStars**
- **Saturday Today**
- **Space Cats**
- **Super Mario World**
- **Wish Kid**
- **Yo Yogi!**

Not returning from 1990–91:

- The Adventures of Super Mario Bros. 3
- Camp Candy
- The Chipmunks Go to the Movies
- Cover to Cover
- Full House (reruns; moved to syndication; New episodes continued to air on ABC)
- Generations
- Gravedale High
- Guys Next Door
- Kid 'n Play
- Let's Make a Deal
- The Marsha Warfield Show
- To Tell the Truth
- TrialWatch
- Wheel of Fortune (continuing in syndication)

== See also ==
- 1991-92 United States network television schedule (prime-time)
- 1991-92 United States network television schedule (late night)

== Sources ==
- https://web.archive.org/web/20071015122215/http://curtalliaume.com/abc_day.html
- https://web.archive.org/web/20071015122235/http://curtalliaume.com/cbs_day.html
- https://web.archive.org/web/20071012211242/http://curtalliaume.com/nbc_day.html
- https://kidsblockblog.wordpress.com/2012/10/25/fox-kids-weekday-lineups-1990-1993/
