= Dr. Dean =

Dr. Dean may refer to:

- Dr. Dean Edell, host of the Dr. Dean Edell radio program
- Dr. Howard Dean, former Democratic Governor of Vermont, former Presidential Candidate, and former head of the Democratic National Committee
