= 1990–91 United States network television schedule (daytime) =

The following is the 1990–91 daytime network television schedule for the four major English-language commercial broadcast networks in the United States. It covers the weekday and weekend daytime hours from September 1990 to August 1991.

== Legend ==
- Light yellow indicates talk shows.
- Green indicates soap operas.
- Pink indicates game shows.
- Gold indicates news and public affairs programming.
- Light teal indicates sporting events.
- White indicates local programming.
- Light purple indicates children's programming.
- Gray indicates encore programming (e.g., reruns of prime-time programming).
- New series are highlighted in **bold**.

== Schedule ==
- All times correspond to U.S. Eastern and Pacific Time scheduling (except for some live sports or events). Except where affiliates slot certain programs outside their network-dictated timeslots, subtract one hour for Central, Mountain, Alaska, and Hawaii-Aleutian times.
- Local schedules may differ, as affiliates have the option to pre-empt or delay network programs. Such scheduling may be limited to preemptions caused by local or national breaking news or weather coverage (which may force stations to tape delay certain programs in overnight timeslots or defer them to a co-operated station or digital subchannel in their regular timeslot) and any major sports events scheduled to air in a weekday timeslot (mainly during major holidays). Stations may air shows at other times at their preference.

=== Monday–Friday ===
Network		6:00 am	6:30 am	7:00 am	7:30 am	8:00 am	8:30 am	9:00 am	9:30 am	10:00 am	10:30 am	11:00 am	11:30 am	noon	12:30 pm	1:00 pm	1:30 pm	2:00 pm	2:30 pm	3:00 pm	3:30 pm	4:00 pm	4:30 pm	5:00 pm	5:30 pm	6:00 pm	6:30 pm
ABC	Fall	ABC World News This Morning		Good Morning America				Local/syndicated programming				Home		Match Game	Loving	All My Children		One Life to Live		General Hospital		Local/syndicated programming					ABC World News Tonight with Peter Jennings
ABC	Summer	ABC World News This Morning		Good Morning America				Local/syndicated programming				Home			Loving	All My Children		One Life to Live		General Hospital		Local/syndicated programming					ABC World News Tonight with Peter Jennings
CBS	Fall	CBS Morning News		CBS This Morning				Local/syndicated programming		Family Feud	Wheel of Fortune	The Price Is Right		Local/syndicated programming	The Young and the Restless		The Bold and the Beautiful	As the World Turns		Guiding Light		Local/syndicated programming					CBS Evening News
CBS	Winter	CBS Morning News		CBS This Morning				Local/syndicated programming		**The Barbara DeAngelis Show**	Family Feud	The Price Is Right		Local/syndicated programming	The Young and the Restless		The Bold and the Beautiful	As the World Turns		Guiding Light		Local/syndicated programming					CBS Evening News
CBS	Spring	CBS Morning News		CBS This Morning				Local/syndicated programming		Family Feud	Family Feud	The Price Is Right		Local/syndicated programming	The Young and the Restless		The Bold and the Beautiful	As the World Turns		Guiding Light		Local/syndicated programming					CBS Evening News
CBS	Summer	CBS Morning News		CBS This Morning				Local/syndicated programming		**Designing Women**	Family Feud	The Price Is Right		Local/syndicated programming	The Young and the Restless		The Bold and the Beautiful	As the World Turns		Guiding Light		Local/syndicated programming					CBS Evening News
NBC	Fall	NBC News at Sunrise		Today				Local/syndicated programming		Let's Make a Deal	Classic Concentration	**To Tell the Truth**	The Marsha Warfield Show	Local/syndicated programming	Generations	Days of Our Lives		Another World		Santa Barbara		Local/syndicated programming					NBC Nightly News with Tom Brokaw
NBC	Winter	NBC News at Sunrise		Today				Local/syndicated programming		**Wheel of Fortune**	Classic Concentration	**To Tell the Truth**	**TrialWatch**	Local/syndicated programming	**A Closer Look**	Days of Our Lives		Another World		Santa Barbara		Local/syndicated programming					NBC Nightly News with Tom Brokaw
NBC	June	NBC News at Sunrise		Today				Local/syndicated programming		**Wheel of Fortune**	Classic Concentration	**Full House**	**TrialWatch**	Local/syndicated programming	**A Closer Look**	Days of Our Lives		Another World		Santa Barbara		Local/syndicated programming					NBC Nightly News with Tom Brokaw
NBC	July	NBC News at Sunrise		Today				Local/syndicated programming		**Wheel of Fortune**	Classic Concentration	**Full House**	**Cover to Cover**	Local/syndicated programming	**A Closer Look**	Days of Our Lives		Another World		Santa Barbara		Local/syndicated programming					NBC Nightly News with Tom Brokaw
Fox		Local/syndicated programming																					**Fox's Peter Pan & the Pirates**	Local/syndicated programming			

NBC note: Wheel of Fortune aired its last daytime episode on September 20, 1991. The following Monday, NBC returned the 10:00 am hour to its affiliates.

=== Saturday ===
Network		7:00 am	7:30 am	8:00 am	8:30 am	9:00 am	9:30 am	10:00 am	10:30 am	11:00 am	11:30 am	noon	12:30 pm	1:00 pm	1:30 pm	2:00 pm	2:30 pm	3:00 pm	3:30 pm	4:00 pm	4:30 pm	5:00 pm	5:30 pm	6:00 pm	6:30 pm
ABC	Fall	Local and/or syndicated programming		The New Adventures of Winnie the Pooh	**The Wizard of Oz**	Slimer! and the Real Ghostbusters		Beetlejuice	**New Kids on the Block**	The Bugs Bunny and Tweety Show		**Little Rosey**	A Pup Named Scooby-Doo	College Football on ABC											
ABC	Winter	Local and/or syndicated programming		The New Adventures of Winnie the Pooh	**The Wizard of Oz**	Slimer! and the Real Ghostbusters		Beetlejuice	**New Kids on the Block**	The Bugs Bunny and Tweety Show		**Little Rosey**	ABC Weekend Special	ABC Sports and/or local programming										Local news	ABC World News Saturday
ABC	August	Local and/or syndicated programming		The New Adventures of Winnie the Pooh	**The Wizard of Oz**	Slimer! and the Real Ghostbusters		Beetlejuice	A Pup Named Scooby-Doo	The Bugs Bunny and Tweety Show		**Little Rosey**	New Kids on the Block	ABC Sports and/or local programming										Local news	ABC World News Saturday
CBS	Fall	Local and/or syndicated programming		Jim Henson's Muppet Babies		Garfield and Friends		**Teenage Mutant Ninja Turtles**		**Bill & Ted's Excellent Adventures**	Pee-wee's Playhouse	Dink, the Little Dinosaur	CBS Storybreak (R)	CBS Sports and/or local programming										Local news	CBS Evening News
CBS	August	Local and/or syndicated programming		Jim Henson's Muppet Babies		Garfield and Friends		**Teenage Mutant Ninja Turtles**		**Bill & Ted's Excellent Adventures**	The Adventures of Raggedy Ann and Andy (R)	Dink, the Little Dinosaur	CBS Storybreak (R)	CBS Sports and/or local programming										Local news	CBS Evening News
NBC	Fall	Local and/or syndicated programming		Camp Candy	Captain N and **The Adventures of Super Mario Bros. 3**		**Gravedale High**	**Kid 'n Play**	The Chipmunks Go to the Movies	Saved by the Bell	**Guys Next Door**	**Saturday Morning Videos**		NBC Sports and/or local programming										Local news	NBC Nightly News
NBC	October	Local and/or syndicated programming		Camp Candy	Captain N and **The Adventures of Super Mario Bros. 3**		**Gravedale High**	**Kid 'n Play**	The Chipmunks Go to the Movies	Saved by the Bell	**Guys Next Door**	Saturday Morning Videos	**NBA Inside Stuff**	NBC Sports and/or local programming										Local news	NBC Nightly News
NBC	November	Local and/or syndicated programming		Camp Candy	Gravedale High	Captain N and The Adventures of Super Mario Bros. 3		**Kid 'n Play**	The Chipmunks Go to the Movies	Saved by the Bell	**Guys Next Door**	Saturday Morning Videos	**NBA Inside Stuff**	NBC Sports and/or local programming										Local news	NBC Nightly News
NBC	January	Local and/or syndicated programming		Camp Candy	Captain N and The Adventures of Super Mario Bros. 3		Gravedale High	**Kid 'n Play**	The Chipmunks Go to the Movies	Saved by the Bell	**Guys Next Door**	Saturday Morning Videos	**NBA Inside Stuff**	NBC Sports and/or local programming										Local news	NBC Nightly News
NBC	May	Local and/or syndicated programming		Camp Candy	Captain N and The Adventures of Super Mario Bros. 3		Gravedale High	**Kid 'n Play**	The Chipmunks Go to the Movies	Saved by the Bell	**Roomies** (R)	Saturday Morning Videos	**NBA Inside Stuff**	NBC Sports and/or local programming										Local news	NBC Nightly News
NBC	July	Local and/or syndicated programming		Camp Candy	Captain N and The Adventures of Super Mario Bros. 3		Gravedale High	**Kid 'n Play**	The Chipmunks Go to the Movies	Saved by the Bell	Saved by the Bell	Saturday Morning Videos		NBC Sports and/or local programming										Local news	NBC Nightly News
Fox	Fall	Local and/or syndicated programming		**Bobby's World**	**Zazoo U**	**Tom & Jerry Kids Show**	**Attack of the Killer Tomatoes**	**Piggsburg Pigs**	**Fun House**	Local and/or syndicated programming															
Fox	October	Local and/or syndicated programming		Zazoo U	Bobby's World	**Tom & Jerry Kids Show**	**Attack of the Killer Tomatoes**	**Piggsburg Pigs**	**Fun House**	Local and/or syndicated programming															
Fox	January	Local and/or syndicated programming		Fox's Peter Pan & the Pirates	Bobby's World	**Tom & Jerry Kids Show**	**Attack of the Killer Tomatoes**	**Piggsburg Pigs**	**Fun House**	Local and/or syndicated programming															
Fox	April	Local and/or syndicated programming		Fox's Peter Pan & the Pirates	Bobby's World	**Tom & Jerry Kids Show**	Tom & Jerry Kids Show	Attack of the Killer Tomatoes	**Swamp Thing** Piggsburg Pigs (May 25–June 29)	Local and/or syndicated programming															
Fox	August	Local and/or syndicated programming		Fox's Peter Pan & the Pirates	Bobby's World	**Tom & Jerry Kids Show**	Tom & Jerry Kids Show	Piggsburg Pigs	Attack of the Killer Tomatoes	Local and/or syndicated programming															

Several Fox stations aired WWF Superstars of Wrestling and/or WWF Wrestling Challenge after the Fox Children's Network block.

=== Sunday ===
Network		7:00 am	7:30 am	8:00 am	8:30 am	9:00 am	9:30 am	10:00 am	10:30 am	11:00 am	11:30 am	noon	12:30 pm	1:00 pm	1:30 pm	2:00 pm	2:30 pm	3:00 pm	3:30 pm	4:00 pm	4:30 pm	5:00 pm	5:30 pm	6:00 pm	6:30 pm
ABC		Local and/or syndicated programming						This Week with David Brinkley		ABC Sports and/or local programming														Local news	ABC World News Sunday
CBS	Fall	Local and/or syndicated programming				CBS News Sunday Morning			Face the Nation	Local and/or syndicated programming		The NFL Today	NFL on CBS and/or local programming												
CBS	Mid-winter	Local and/or syndicated programming				CBS News Sunday Morning			Face the Nation	Local and/or syndicated programming		CBS Sports and/or local programming												Local news	CBS Evening News
NBC	Fall	Local and/or syndicated programming		Sunday Today			Meet the Press	Local and/or syndicated programming				NFL Live!	NFL on NBC												
NBC	Mid-winter	Local and/or syndicated programming		Sunday Today			Meet the Press	Local and/or syndicated programming				NBC Sports and/or local programming												Local news	NBC Nightly News

== By network ==
=== ABC ===
Returning series:

- ABC Weekend Special
- ABC World News This Morning
- ABC World News Tonight with Peter Jennings
- All My Children
- Beetlejuice
- The Bugs Bunny and Tweety Show
- General Hospital
- Good Morning America
- Home
- Loving
- Match Game
- The New Adventures of Winnie the Pooh
- One Life to Live
- A Pup Named Scooby-Doo
- Slimer! and the Real Ghostbusters
- This Week with David Brinkley

New series:

- **Little Rosey**
- **New Kids on the Block**
- **The Wizard of Oz**

Not returning from 1989-90:

- Adventures of the Gummi Bears
- Animal Crack-Ups
- The Flintstone Kids (reruns)
- Perfect Strangers (reruns)

=== CBS ===
Returning series:

- The Adventures of Raggedy Ann and Andy (reruns)
- As the World Turns
- The Bold and the Beautiful
- CBS Evening News
- CBS Morning News
- CBS News Sunday Morning
- CBS Storybreak (reruns)
- CBS This Morning
- Dink, the Little Dinosaur
- Face the Nation
- Family Feud
- Garfield and Friends
- Guiding Light
- Jim Henson's Muppet Babies
- Pee-wee's Playhouse
- The Price Is Right
- Teenage Mutant Ninja Turtles
- Wheel of Fortune
- The Young and the Restless

New series:

- **The Barbara DeAngelis Show**
- **Bill & Ted's Excellent Adventures**
- **Designing Women** (reruns)
- **Soap Star Family Feud**

Not returning from 1989-90:

- The California Raisins Show
- Dungeons & Dragons
- Rude Dog and the Dweebs

=== Fox ===
New series:

- **Fox Children's Network**
  - **Attack of the Killer Tomatoes**
  - **Bobby's World**
  - **Fun House**
  - **Fox's Peter Pan & the Pirates**
  - **Piggsburg Pigs**
  - **Swamp Thing**
  - **Tom & Jerry Kids Show**
  - **Zazoo U**

=== NBC ===
Returning series:

- Another World
- Camp Candy
- Captain N: The Game Master
- The Chipmunks Go to the Movies
- Classic Concentration
- Days of Our Lives
- Generations
- Let's Make a Deal
- The Marsha Warfield Show
- Meet the Press
- NBC News at Sunrise
- NBC Nightly News with Tom Brokaw
- Santa Barbara
- Saved by the Bell
- Sunday Today
- Today
- Wheel of Fortune

New series:

- **The Adventures of Super Mario Bros. 3**
- **A Closer Look/The Faith Daniels Show**
- **Cover to Cover**
- **Full House** (reruns)
- **Gravedale High**
- **Guys Next Door**
- **Kid 'n Play**
- **NBA Inside Stuff**
- **Roomies** (reruns)
- **Saturday Morning Videos**
- **To Tell the Truth**
- **TrialWatch**

Not returning from 1989-90:

- ALF (reruns)
- ALF Tales
- The Golden Girls (reruns)
- The Karate Kid
- Kissyfur (reruns)
- Scrabble
- The Smurfs

== See also ==
- 1990-91 United States network television schedule (prime-time)
- 1990-91 United States network television schedule (late night)

== Sources ==
- https://web.archive.org/web/20071015122215/http://curtalliaume.com/abc_day.html
- https://web.archive.org/web/20071015122235/http://curtalliaume.com/cbs_day.html
- https://web.archive.org/web/20071012211242/http://curtalliaume.com/nbc_day.html
