= TNBC (disambiguation) =

TNBC was an American teen-oriented programming block.

TNBC may also refer to:

- Triple-negative breast cancer, any breast cancer that does not express the genes for estrogen receptor, progesterone receptor, and HER2/neu
- The Nightmare Before Christmas, a 1993 stop-motion musical film
- The Night Before Christmas, an alternative title of the 1823 poem A Visit from St. Nicholas by Clement Clarke Moore
