= Chip and Pepper =

Identical twin businessmen from Winnipeg, Manitoba, Canada

Chip and Pepper Foster
- Industry: Clothing
- Founded: 1987
- Headquarters: Winnipeg, Manitoba, Canada
- Area served: Canada
- Products: Denim, sportswear, bakery products
- Website: www.chipandpepper.com

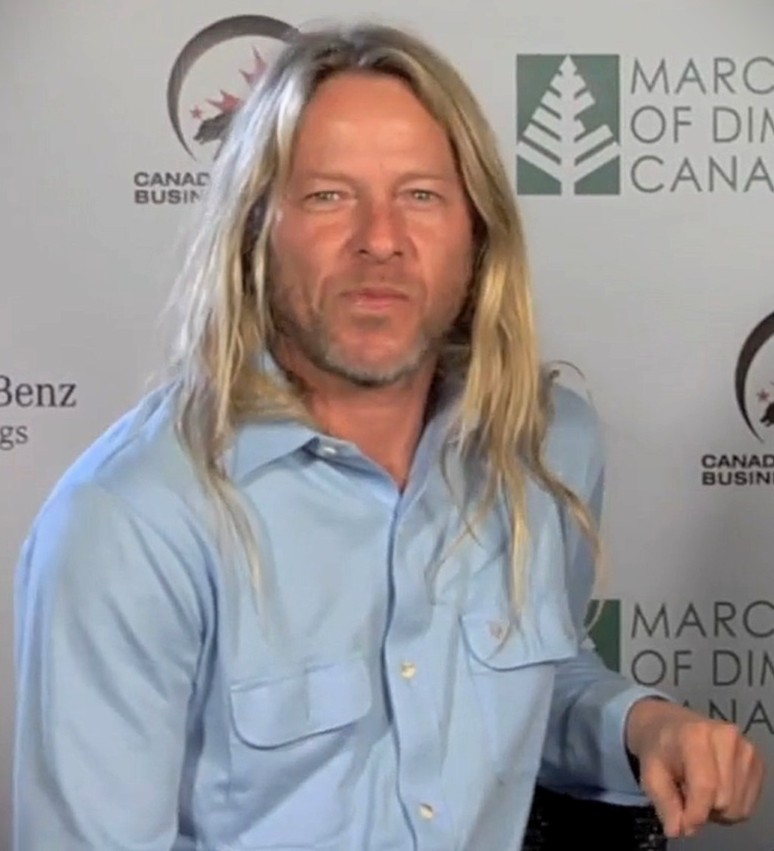
Pepper Foster in 2013

Chip and Pepper Foster are identical twin businessmen from Winnipeg, Manitoba, Canada. The co-owners of Chip & Pepper California, they are former hosts of their own NBC series, Chip and Pepper's Cartoon Madness.

== Chip and Pepper's Cartoon Madness ==
At a peak in their popularity, the Foster brothers appeared on a Canadian TV station, singing "Chip and Pepper: get hip or get out!" The footage came into the hands of NBC's head of entertainment, Brandon Tartikoff, who decided to give them a Saturday morning cartoon show. In fall 1991, Chip and Pepper's Cartoon Madness debuted. The new addition to NBC's animated line-up included sketches and interviews, but old cartoons such as Casper and Captain Caveman took up most of the airtime. The show lasted one season before NBC dropped its animated block altogether in 1992.

== Apparel line ==
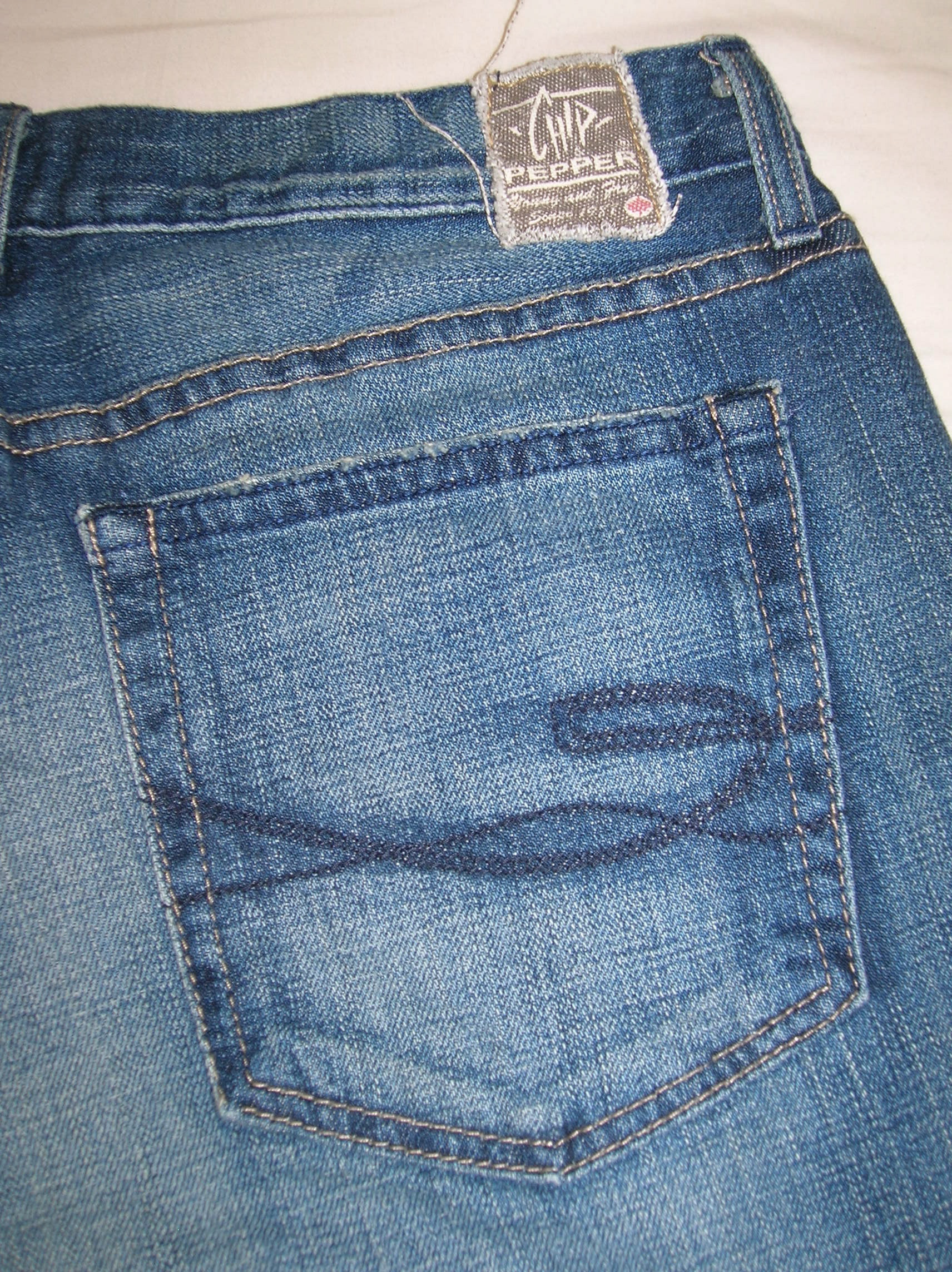
Chip & Pepper's original logo on a pair of blue jeans

Chip & Pepper California is a clothing company which specializes in denim and sportswear. It was launched in 1987. In 2003, it entered the premium denim market. It is sold in over 42 countries. The tie-dye fashions were popular in Canada in the late 1980s and early 1990s.

== Golf Punk and appearances on the Style Network/E! ==
In 1994, the Fosters opened a store by the name of Golf Punk. As it grew, they decided to resurrect their signature brand in the fall of 2003 in Los Angeles. They made appearances as stylists on the Style Network show The Look For Less, and on E!, including Glamour's 50 Biggest Fashion Dos & Don'ts.

== C7P ==
In 2007, the Fosters introduced a brand new line with JC Penney called C7P. The line was aimed particularly at the teen market, including an array of denim items including jeans, skirts, Bermuda shorts, crop pants, T-shirts, tops, and fleece.

== Legal troubles ==
In 2023 Chip and Pepper became involved in Winnipeg's KUB Bakery. Allegations were made by Sheldon Pescitelli who was partnered with them in the venture, that Chip and Pepper improperly handled the finances, making off with over $700,000 of loaned money intended for the bakery. Pescitelli stated: “Pepper just kept stringing us along that pay would come next week, next week, next week. He was convincing me to convince (my staff) that it was just rough waters at the beginning.”

Pepper is also facing lawsuits from two Winnipeg law firms to whom he owes over $33,000. An additional lawsuit from Royal Bank of Canada alleges that he has "neglected or refused" to pay back debts. In total, Pepper now owes the bank $681,988.53, which includes accrued interest, according to the lawsuit.

== Legacy ==
The 2021 Netflix series Saturday Morning All Star Hits! spoofs the duo as Skip and Treybor, each played by Kyle Mooney.
