= The Marsha Warfield Show =

- Genre: Talk show
- Presented by: Marsha Warfield
- Country of origin: United States
- Original language: English
- No. of seasons: 1

Production
- Producers: Marilyn Gill; Darlene Hayes
- Camera setup: Multi-camera
- Running time: 48 minutes
- Production companies: Kline and Friends; Back Burner Productions

Original release
- Network: NBC
- Release: March 26, 1990 – January 25, 1991

The Marsha Warfield Show is an American daytime talk show that aired for ten months on NBC from March 26, 1990 to January 25, 1991. Comedian and actress Marsha Warfield served as host.

== Overview ==
Each show featured several guests who, on the surface, did not seem to have anything in common. Warfield then got her guests to talk about hot-topic issues. The show was light-hearted and Warfield's set included a basketball hoop.
