= TNBC =

American television programming block

- Final logo, used from 2000 to 2002
- Network: NBC
- Launched: September 12, 1992
- Closed: September 28, 2002
- Country of origin: United States
- Format: Saturday morning live-action teen programming block
- Running time: 2½ hours (1992–97); 3 hours (1997–2002)
- Original language: English

TNBC (or Teen NBC) was an American teen-oriented television programming block that aired on NBC from September 12, 1992 to September 28, 2002, when it was replaced with the children's-oriented Discovery Kids on NBC educational lineup. The Saturday morning block featured comical live-action series – primarily in the form of scripted sitcoms and variety series such as Saved by the Bell, California Dreams, Hang Time, One World, City Guys and others – geared toward teenagers and sometimes young adults, the majority of which were produced by Peter Engel and the network's in-house production units NBC Studios and NBC Enterprises.

The TNBC branding was briefly reused, from August 2023 to June 2024, for a standalone free ad-supported streaming television channel, which included reruns of programming from the original TNBC block.

== History ==
As early as 1988, NBC had been openly contemplating replacing its Saturday morning cartoon programming block of children's animation with less expensive, in-house programming oriented towards older audiences, such as talk shows and travel-themed programs, due to increasing competition from weekday afternoon cartoons airing in first-run syndication. The idea for a block specifically oriented towards a teenage demographic sprang from the popularity of the live-action teen sitcom Saved by the Bell, which debuted on the network's Saturday morning lineup in September 1989 and centered on a group of six students attending the fictional Bayside High School in Pacific Palisades, Los Angeles.

In 2000, Just Deal became the first TNBC scripted series not to be produced by Peter Engel since the 1993 series Running the Halls, and the first series to be shot in a single-camera format. The following year, Sk8 premiered on the block, lasting for one season before being canceled. Both Just Deal and Sk8 were productions of Thomas W. Lynch, who had previously produced several hit teen dramas for Nickelodeon. By 2001, the block was suffering from declining viewership, particularly among its intended audience of teens; much of its audience by this point was from older viewers who had left their TV on after Weekend Today ended, and by its last season, the average age of a TNBC viewer was 41 years old.

NBC shut down the program block in 2002, leasing out its children's programming to Discovery Kids in a brokered programming arrangement. NBC blamed TNBC's failure on the network's poor performance among younger viewers in its regular prime time program lineup, leaving no opportunity to promote children's programming there; the network would have abandoned children's programming altogether if not for federal E/I mandates requiring them.

== Return ==
On June 29, 2023, NBCUniversal announced it would revive the TNBC brand for a free ad-supported streaming television channel to launch on Amazon Freevee and Xumo Play on August 15, 2023. Debuting as part of a larger slate of FAST channels featuring content from the NBCUniversal library, the channel included reruns of programming from the TNBC block, as well as other NBCUniversal-owned sitcoms such as Punky Brewster and Major Dad. On May 31, 2024, it was announced that TNBC would be rebranded the next day; June 1, 2024, as NBC Comedy Vault.

== Programming ==
- Saved by the Bell (1992–1993)
- Double Up (1992)
- California Dreams (1992–1996)
- Name Your Adventure (1992–1995)
- Brains & Brawn (1993)
- Running the Halls (1993)
- Saved by the Bell: The New Class (1993–2000)
- Hang Time (1995–2000)
- City Guys (1997–2001)
- One World (1998–2001)
- Just Deal (2000–2002)
- All About Us (2001)
- Sk8 (2001–2002)

== See also ==
- Children's programming on NBC
