= Scattergories (game show) =

- Genre: Game show
- Presented by: Dick Clark
- Announcer: Charlie Tuna
- Country of origin: United States
- Original language: English
- No. of episodes: 90 (1993; 1 unaired)

Production
- Running time: 25 minutes
- Production company: Reg Grundy Productions

Original release
- Network: NBC
- Release: January 18 – June 11, 1993

Scattergories is an American game show on NBC daytime hosted by Dick Clark, with Charlie Tuna as announcer, that aired from January 18 to June 11, 1993. It is an adaptation of the board game Scattergories, featuring two teams of contestants competing to name words that fit a category or topic, and begin with a pre-determined letter of the alphabet. It was produced by Reg Grundy Productions and was the second to last American game show to be produced by the company.

== Gameplay ==
The gameplay is an adaptation of Scattergories, a board game created by Milton Bradley. Two teams of four people of the same gender (men vs women) competed on each episode, and they were accompanied by a panel of five celebrities. Instead of being physically present in the studio, though, the panelists videotaped their responses to the game questions in advance; they also recorded introductions for the host and dialogues leading into and out of commercial breaks.

=== Main game ===
The team in control was given 15 seconds to name up to six items that fit a stated category and began with a specified letter of the alphabet. Contestants had to raise their hands before answering, and could not confer with their teammates. No contestant could give two consecutive responses, and an individual word could be used in no more than two answers. The team scored one point for each answer given within the time limit, after which the opposing team was then given an opportunity to challenge any responses they believed were unacceptable. Challenges were settled by a majority vote among a panel of five judges chosen from the studio audience. The team in control gained or lost one point for each response accepted or rejected by the panel, respectively. After the challenges were finished (if any), the team chose four celebrity panelists, one at a time, whose responses to the category/letter were then played back. The team scored one additional point for each panelist's response that was not on their list.

Early in the show's run, the host stated a category/letter at the beginning of the first round, and the first contestant to buzz in and give an acceptable response scored one point and secured initial control for his/her team. Later, the toss-up was dropped and the challengers played first. Some former contestants were invited to serve as judges during the latter portion of the run.

Two rounds were played, with each team having control for one turn per round. All responses and challenges were worth two points in the second round, and initial control was given to the leading team. The high scorers at the end of the second round won the game and $500. In the event of a tie, a toss-up similar to the first-round starter was played; the first contestant to buzz in and give an acceptable response won the game for his/her team.

Teams remained on the show until they were defeated or won five consecutive matches.

=== Bonus round ===
One final category was played, with each celebrity giving one answer that started with a different assigned letter. The team had 25 seconds to provide two answers for each of these five letters, playing through them in an order specified by the host. Once time ran out, any celebrities associated with unacceptable answers were taken out of play, as were any for whom the team had failed to give two answers.

The answers given by the remaining ("unlocked") celebrities were then revealed. If a celebrity's answer did not match either of the two given by the team, he/she was "captured." Capturing any three celebrities awarded a cash jackpot that began at $4,000 and increased by $1,000 every day it went unclaimed. Otherwise, the team won $100 per unlocked celebrity.

Originally, the winning team started the round by choosing one of five cards, each containing the name of a different celebrity. The team won the jackpot if they had captured the celebrity whose name they had drawn, or if all five had been captured. If they were unsuccessful, they won $200 per capture.

== Broadcast history ==
Scattergories and a revival of Grundy's earlier Scrabble joined the NBC lineup on the same day; NBC was looking to replace the soap opera Santa Barbara, which had been airing since 1984 but had recently suffered a dive in ratings thanks in part to stations becoming more prone to moving their schedules around to open the 3:00 pm slot Santa Barbara occupied for other programming such as talk shows. NBC agreed to give that time slot back to the affiliates once Santa Barbara ended, making it the first of the major American broadcast networks to do this; ABC gave the slot back in 2012, while CBS allowed flexibility to its own affiliates as to where they choose to air programming.

In exchange, NBC reclaimed the 12:00 pm slot and chose to place both of its new game shows in the noon hour. Scattergories aired at 12:30 pm, following Scrabble, for its entire run. However, most NBC affiliates would not air Scattergories at its scheduled time due to their continuing practice of airing local newscasts or other syndicated programming in the 12:00 pm hour; this resulted in some NBC stations airing the show in a different spot on their schedule while others did not air it at all, often relegating it to independent stations in some media markets.

In the markets that did air Scattergories at its scheduled time, the show faced off against Loving on ABC and the first half-hour of The Young and the Restless on CBS. Scattergories did not perform well enough against either soap opera. As a result, NBC cancelled Scattergories after twenty-one weeks of episodes and aired its last episode on June 11, 1993. The show was then replaced on June 14 by Caesars Challenge which began airing at 12:30 pm until December 31, 1993, then moved to 12:00 pm three days later for its last two weeks, finally ending in that slot on January 14, 1994, becoming the last new daytime game show to date. (Note: CBS's The Price Is Right was the only daytime game show on network television from January 17, 1994 to October 5, 2009, when the current version of Let's Make a Deal premiered on CBS.)
