= Family Secrets (game show) =

- Created by: Dave Bell
- Developed by: Stephen Radosh
- Presented by: Bob Eubanks
- Announcer: Dean Miuccio
- Country of origin: United States
- No. of episodes: 59 (1 unaired)

Production
- Executive producer: Dave Bell
- Running time: 30 minutes
- Production company: Dave Bell Productions

Original release
- Network: NBC
- Release: March 22 – June 11, 1993

Family Secrets is a daytime game show, running on NBC from March 22 to June 11, 1993. Bob Eubanks hosted and Orlando-area disc jockey Dean Miuccio announced. The show was taped at the Disney-MGM Studios in Orlando, Florida in front of a live studio audience consisting of theme park guests.

== Gameplay ==
Two families, consisting of two parents and one child, competed in a game similar to Eubanks' own The Newlywed Game.

=== Round 1 ===
In round one, the parents were brought into isolation, then the kids were asked two questions about their dad. Their dads were then brought out of isolation and were asked for their answers to the same questions. Each match was worth $100. The process is then repeated with two questions about their moms.

=== Round 2 ===
In round two, the kids are put in isolation. The parents are then asked two questions about their kids. The kids were then brought out to answer the same questions, with each match being worth $200.

=== Final question ===
For the last question, a numerical question about the average American family was asked. Each family had ten seconds to write down their answer. The family that came closest (or, if both families were in the same numerical range, the family with the higher number) won $500. After this round, the family with the most money (out of a possible $1,300) won the game, an extra prize and moved on to the bonus round. If there was a tie at the end of the game, a second numerical question was asked with the same rules.

=== Bonus round ===
The bonus round was played for a family vacation. Up to five trivia questions would be asked of the winning team. Before each question, Eubanks would give the child the category of the question and have them decide whether mom or dad would answer it. If the team gave three wrong answers, the round ended with a loss, but if they gave three correct answers they won the trip.

== Controversy ==
During the series' run, controversy arose when one team competing on the show turned out not to be a real family. Identifying themselves as the Hansen family, the team actually consisted of a father, his 10-year-old daughter and his live-in girlfriend who posed as the daughter's mother. A May 1993 Chicago Tribune report reported the team won $6,000 in prizes, but the girl's real mother discovered the deception. She contacted NBC and Dave Bell Associates, the series' packagers, to get the episode pulled before its intended May 27, 1993 broadcast date. Officials at both companies agreed to pull the episode and replace it with a rerun. The father and his girlfriend married on June 11, 1993, the same date of the series finale.

The daughter was awarded her prizes (a camera and a CD player), but the family was not awarded the family cruise or their cash.

== Cancellation ==
The series was cancelled after 12 weeks not only because of low ratings, but also because not enough contestants were meeting eligibility requirements. The series was replaced with Caesars Challenge.
