= Name Your Adventure =

American reality television series

- Genre: Reality
- Directed by: Jordan Brady; Carl Buehl; Brian K. Roberts; Charlie Ryan; Michael F. Sears; Sue Steinberg; Patrick Taulère
- Presented by: Tatyana Ali; Jordan Brady; Mario Lopez
- Composer: Greg O'Connor
- Country of origin: United States
- Original language: English
- No. of seasons: 3

Production
- Executive producers: Kerri Zane (Friedland); Scott A. Friedland
- Running time: 22–24 minutes

Original release
- Network: NBC
- Release: September 12, 1992 – September 2, 1995

Name Your Adventure is an American reality series that aired on Saturday mornings during NBC's TNBC line-up. Created and executive produced by Kerri and Scott Friedland, the series was hosted by Mario Lopez, Jordan Brady, and Tatyana Ali. The series ran from September 12, 1992 to September 2, 1995.

== Synopsis ==
The show was about making the dreams of ordinary children and teenagers come true. Viewers aged 9 to 17 would submit letters to be chosen. Then the hosts of the show would go to a lucky teenager's house, surprise him or her and join in as he or she experienced an all-expenses-paid adventure, whether it was to be an actor, a track star or an astrologer.

On one episode, a teenager got to meet President Bill Clinton. Another episode saw Mario Lopez take a teen who wanted to be an Olympic diver on an adventure to meet Olympic Diving Gold Medalist, Greg Louganis. Another featured a teen becoming a roadie and setting up a concert for Richard Marx. Other episodes featured teenagers in Alaska with working alongside the U.S.G.S. A pas de deux with the lead dancers of the Joffrey Ballet. Tap dancing with Gregory Hines, to name a few.

== Awards and nominations ==
Year	Award	Result	Category
1993	Young Artist Awards	Outstanding Hosts for a Youth Magazine, News or Game Show	Mario Lopez
1994	Young Artist Awards	Outstanding Hosts for a Youth Magazine, News or Game Show	Mario Lopez
