= Guys Next Door =

American television series

- Genre: Sketch comedy
- Created by: Deborah McKay
- Developed by: Deborah McKay; Vince Manze
- Written by: Deborah McKay; Steve Mackal; Tom Burkhard
- Directed by: Jon Ezrine; Dominic Orlando; Rick Squire
- Starring: Patrick J. Dancy; Eddie Garcia; Bobby Leslie; Damon Sharpe; Chris Wolf
- Voices of: Corey Burton
- Theme music composer: Charlie Midnight; Dan Hartman
- Opening theme: "(We're The) Guys Next Door"
- Composers: David Shapiro; Howie Hersh
- Country of origin: United States
- Original language: English
- No. of seasons: 1
- No. of episodes: 13

Production
- Executive producers: Vince Manze; Deb Leibling
- Producer: Deborah McKay
- Production location: NBC Studios, Burbank, California
- Editor: Lynne Lussier
- Running time: 30 minutes
- Production company: NBC Productions

Original release
- Network: NBC
- Release: 27 August 1990 – 16 February 1991

Guys Next Door is an American sketch comedy television series aired on NBC in the 1990–91 season as part of its Saturday morning lineup. It featured a boy band performing comedy sketches and spoofs, as a combination of New Kids on the Block with The Monkees. The show starred Patrick J. Dancy, Eddie Garcia, Bobby Leslie, Damon Sharpe, and Chris Wolf. Several music videos were created for the individual episodes; they were produced by Joseph Sassone and directed by Dominic Orlando.

As a band, the group was signed to SBK Records and released a self-titled album, which spawned a single titled "I've Been Waiting for You". The single peaked at #42 on the Billboard Hot 100 singles chart on February 23, 1991.

While Wolf and Leslie dropped out of the public eye after the show ended, Dancy and Garcia are still active as actors. Sharpe is currently a music producer and songwriter who has worked with such artists as Jennifer Lopez, Kylie Minogue, Anastacia, Kelly Rowland, Big Time Rush, New Boyz, and Monica.

The series sparked criticism by parents, teachers, and media experts due to airing a targeted program for young adult audiences on Saturday mornings that was since attended to be a marathon for children, causing the series to be cancelled after one season. Prior to its cancellation in 1991, then-President George H. W. Bush signed a deal to require educational content on NBC by the Children's Television Act, which became a downfall for the network and completely eliminating children’s programming in Summer 1992.
