= Wish Kid =

American animated television series

- Title card
- Genre: Comedy; Fantasy; Family
- Created by: Andy Heyward
- Written by: Jeffrey Scott
- Directed by: Chuck Patton; Christopher Brough (live action segments)
- Starring: Macaulay Culkin; Quinn Culkin; Chris Beshy; Paul Haddad; Marilyn Lightstone; Judy Marshak; Andrew Sabiston; Stuart Stone; James Rankin
- Composer: Clark Gassman
- Countries of origin: United States; Italy
- Original language: English
- No. of series: 1
- No. of episodes: 13

Production
- Executive producer: Andy Heyward
- Producers: Chuck Patton; Christopher Brough (live action segments)
- Editors: Gregory K. Bowron; Richard Bruce Elliot; Allan Gelbart
- Running time: 30 minutes
- Production companies: DIC Animation City; Reteitalia S.p.A.

Original release
- Network: NBC (U.S.); Telecinco (Spain)
- Release: September 14 – December 7, 1991

Wish Kid is an animated series that aired on Saturday mornings from September 14 to December 7, 1991 on NBC starring Macaulay Culkin. It was produced by DIC Animation City and Italian company Reteitalia S.p.A., in association with Spanish network Telecinco.

A second season was planned for 1993 to air on The Family Channel, but this was later cancelled.

== Synopsis ==
Nicholas "Nick" McClary (modeled after and voiced by Culkin), a 10-year-old boy, owns a baseball glove that had been struck by a miniature shooting star, an event that inexplicably enabled it to magically grant wishes, if punched three times. It is, however, limited to use only once every week, and each wish would expire relatively shortly after it was cast, often at the most inopportune time possible. Each story — introduced in a live-action prologue by Culkin — revolves around Nick's wishes and the trouble that always seems to follow. It is up to Nick and others involved to resolve the situation and make things right.

Darryl Singletary is Nick's best friend and the only one in on the secret; he always manages to get tangled up in Nick's adventures. Francis "Frankie" Dutweiler is the neighborhood bully who often antagonizes Nick and Darryl. Other characters include Mel and Adrienne McClary, Nick's parents, who are a reporter/photographer and real estate agent, respectively; Nick's younger sister, Katie (voiced by Quinn Culkin, Macaulay's real life sister), his pet dog, Slobber, and nosy neighbor, Mrs. Opal.

== Voice cast ==
- Macaulay Culkin - Nicholas "Nick" McClary
- Quinn Culkin - Katie McClary
- Paul De La Rosa
- Paul Haddad
- Marilyn Lightstone
- Judy Marshak
- Andrew Sabiston
- Stuart Stone - Darryl Singletary
- James Rankin
- Harvey Atkin
- Tara Strong
- Joe Matheson
- Benji Plener
- Catherine Gallant
- Susan Roman
- Greg Swanson

== Episodes ==
episode#	Title	Air date
1	Top Gun - Will Travel	September 14, 1991
2	A Matter of Principal	September 21, 1991
3	Haunted House For Sale	September 28, 1991
4	Captain Mayhem	October 5, 1991
5	Glove of Dreams	October 12, 1991
6	Love At First Wish	October 19, 1991
7	Lotto Trouble	October 26, 1991
8	Darryl's Dilemma	November 2, 1991
9	A Nick Off the Old Block	November 9, 1991
10	A Grand Ol' Time	November 16, 1991
11	Gross Encounters	November 23, 1991
12	Mom, Dad, You're Fired!	November 30, 1991
13	The Best of Enemies	December 7, 1991

== Home media ==
BMG Kidz and Buena Vista Home Video originally released single episode VHS tapes of the series during the 1990s.

In October 2003, Sterling Entertainment Group released a VHS/DVD titled "Be Careful What You Wish For", containing 3 episodes (4 on the DVD). The DVD was re-released by NCircle Entertainment in February 2008.

In February 2015, Mill Creek Entertainment released Wish Kid - The Complete Series on DVD in Region 1.

== Syndication ==
After the show's initial airing, the show's theme song, which parodied Chantilly Lace, was replaced with a recomposed instrumental version due to copyright issues.
