= Taz-Mania =

American animated television series

- Genre: Animated sitcom
- Created by: Tom Ruegger
- Based on: Looney Tunes by Warner Bros.; Tasmanian Devil by Robert McKimson Sid Marcus
- Developed by: Art Vitello
- Voices of: Jim Cummings; John Astin; Dan Castellaneta; Debi Derryberry; Miriam Flynn; Maurice LaMarche; Rosalyn Landor; Kellie Martin; Rob Paulsen; Philip Proctor
- Theme music composer: Richard Stone
- Opening theme: "Come to Taz-Mania" performed by Jess Harnell and Jim Cummings
- Ending theme: "Come to Taz-Mania" (Instrumental)
- Composers: J. Eric Schmidt; Richard Stone; Mark Watters; Don Davis; Steve Bernstein; John Given; Carl Johnson; Harvey Cohen; Jerry Grant
- Country of origin: United States
- Original languages: English; Silent
- No. of seasons: 4
- No. of episodes: 65 (121 segments)

Production
- Executive producers: Jean MacCurdy; Tom Ruegger
- Producer: Art Vitello
- Running time: 30 minutes
- Production company: Warner Bros. Animation

Original release
- Network: Fox Kids
- Release: September 7, 1991 – May 22, 1995

Related
- Tiny Toon Adventures (1990–95); The Plucky Duck Show (1992)

Taz-Mania is an American animated sitcom produced by Warner Bros. Animation from 1991 to 1995. It was broadcast in the United States on Fox Kids. It stars the Looney Tunes character Tasmanian Devil.

It is similar in tone to other Warner Bros. cartoons of its time, such as Animaniacs and Tiny Toon Adventures (both of which were created by Taz-Mania co-developer Tom Ruegger). The title song is performed by Jess Harnell and Jim Cummings.

== Premise ==
The show follows the adventures of the Looney Tunes character Taz the Tasmanian Devil in the fictional land of Tazmania (based on Tasmania). The intro indicates that in this rendering of Tasmania "the sky's always yellow, rain or shine".

== Characters ==
=== Tazmanian Devil family ===
- Taz the Tazmanian Devil (voiced by Jim Cummings) is the central character of the series and appears in every episode. Taz is the older brother of Molly and Jake. Taz is uncouth, feral, dirty, always hungry, and suffers aquaphobia; unlike his original incarnation, he is capable of lucidity and can converse normally in addition to frequently breaking the fourth wall. He works as a bellhop at the Hotel Tazmania.
- Jean Tazmanian Devil (voiced by Miriam Flynn) is Taz, Molly, and Jake's loving, hard-working mother. Many episodes circle around her speaking on the phone and running through a long list of chores she has created for herself.
- Hugh Tazmanian Devil (voiced by Maurice LaMarche impersonating Bing Crosby) is Taz, Molly, and Jake's suave, friendly, and logical father. Hugh likes orange juice (a reference to Crosby being a famous pitch-man for orange juice), golf, and bowling and he will often over-explain things to the point where he will say "blah-blah-blah, yackity schmackity".
- Molly Tazmanian Devil (voiced by Kellie Martin) is Taz and Jake's 16-year-old sister. Despite being more composed than her brother, she often shares his wild and aggressive nature, though in a more sibling-rivalry sense.
- Jake Tazmanian Devil (voiced by Debi Derryberry) is Taz and Molly's crazy, hyperactive, cute, and imaginative little brother, who idolizes Taz.
- Dog the Turtle (vocal effects provided by Rob Paulsen) is Taz, Molly, and Jake's pet turtle, who acts like a dog.
- Drew Tazmanian Devil (voiced by Maurice LaMarche impersonating Bob Hope) is Taz, Molly, and Jake's good-humored, cool, zany, and lovable uncle. Like Hugh, Drew enjoys golf, bowling, telling jokes, and heading out on road trips (often forcing Taz into joining them) in spoofs of Hope and Crosby's Road to... film series of the 1940s and 1950s.

=== Hotel Tazmania staff ===
- Bushwhacker Bob (voiced by Jim Cummings impersonating John Cleese) is Taz's arrogant, incompetent, intimidating, and cranky boss who is Hotel Tazmania's hotel manager. As the owner of the Hotel Tazmania, he is a misanthropic snob, who rarely does any actual work, preferring to leave any and all tasks to his staff. His demeanor is inspired by that of Cleese's Basil Fawlty, protagonist of the British sitcom Fawlty Towers.
- Mum (voiced by Rosalyn Landor) is Bushwhacker Bob's mother who is much more patient and intelligent than her son. Despite her son being the hotel manager the Hotel Tazmania, Mum is the proprietor of the establishment. She is often quick to embarrass her son despite her comments typically being true.
- Constance Koala (voiced by Rosalyn Landor) is an enormous but gentle and humble koala who is the maid at the Hotel Tazmania. She is quite fond of singing and dancing, despite her dancing often causing unintentional destruction. She is in the same dance class that Molly takes when Taz tries ballet.
- Mr. Thickly (voiced by Dan Castellaneta) is an optimistic, genial, and fun-loving wallaby whose exact job title is unspecified. He considers himself a jack-of-all-trades, always prefacing the activities he does with Taz with an exclamation that he's "an expert". He enjoys doing favors for Taz, but his ineptitude usually results in chaos.

=== Outback characters ===
- Digeri Dingo (voiced by Rob Paulsen) is a conceited dingo. He and Taz share a mutual love for bottle cap collecting. A scavenger, treasure hunter, and chronic collector, he often takes advantage of Taz's strength and ferocious nature to hunt rare treasures. Typically after he gets what he wants, he still berates Taz for bringing it back in a tarnished condition. On occasion, Digeri would also get some type of comeuppance when his plans fail like getting attacked by the same marine life that attacked Taz or getting annoyed by Taz's family. His name is a play on the digeridoo.
- Wendal T. Wolf (voiced by Jim Cummings impersonating Woody Allen) is a neurotic Tasmanian wolf who is desperate for any type of friendship. He resembles a shorter and recolored version of Wile E. Coyote. When not being hunted by Taz, he usually drives him crazy in his efforts to befriend him. In his first appearance, it is revealed that Wendal doesn't taste good to Taz causing him to regurgitate Wendal.
- Francis X. Bushlad (voiced by Rob Paulsen) is a white-skinned, red-haired aboriginal boy of the Mudpeople Tribe in a diaper-shaped loincloth who unsuccessfully hunts Taz as a rite of manhood. Despite their tribal society, his entire tribe behave and speak like well-educated, posh businessmen. His name recalls silent movie star Francis X. Bushman.
- Chief Felton (voiced by Jim Cummings impersonating Jim Backus) is the leader of the Mudpeople Tribe and Francis' father.
- Bull Gator and Axl (voiced by John Astin and Rob Paulsen respectively) are two alligators who unsuccessfully try to trap Taz for the enjoyment of zoo-going children around the world (as a rather weak pretense to the massive financial gain the endeavor will grant them). Bull is the leader of the duo, always acting in a happy and upbeat attitude even while reprimanding Axl. Axl is Bull's hunter-in-training, constantly naïve, though often subject to Bull's "corrections" (typically in the form of a mallet smashing). They vaguely resemble Laurel and Hardy.
- Hamilton Butkis "Buddy" Boar (voiced by Jim Cummings) is a wild boar who acts like a yuppie-type Hollywood talent agent. He is often seen talking on his mobile phone to anyone who calls him up and is best friends with Taz. Though Buddy tends to take advantage of Taz at times, he does not seem to treat him nearly as badly as Digeri Dingo, Mr. Thickley, and the Platypus Brothers do. In "I'm Okay Your Taz", Buddy is revealed to still live with his mother. He was established early in the show, but was seemingly ill-received, reflected in several fourth wall-breaking moments by the show's characters. As such, Buddy's appearances were uncommon. His later appearances suggest he was promoted to the show's producer after he was considered to be an unliked character on the show proper as mentioned by the receptionist in "Willy Wombat's Last Stand" and he later attempts to direct an episode featuring Bull and Axl with catastrophic results in "Retakes Not Included".
- Daniel and Timothy, known as the Platypus Brothers (voiced by Maurice LaMarche and Rob Paulsen) are twin platypus brothers. Timothy is the only one who wears glasses. Their love of do-it-yourself projects usually ends up causing trouble for Taz and occasionally for Bushwhacker Bob when they help out at Hotel Tazmania. They seem to be the Goofy Gophers and Daffy Duck combined in appearance and manner of speech. A pair of episodes deal with their obsession with the primetime cartoon "The McKimsons", a Simpsons parody featuring a character who constantly shouts "No way, I'm out of here, man!"
- The Kee-Wee is a silent kiwi. It can run as fast as the Road Runner, often being chased down by Taz in search of his lunch in the same manner as Wile E. Coyote. At different points, other characters have helped Taz hunt the Kee-Wee. In its debut episode "Kee-Wee Ala King", Buddy Boar helps Taz hunt the Kee-Wee due to the fact that wild boars also prey off of Kee-Wee according to a book called "The Birds of Tazmania: Swimsuit Edition". In "Bottle Cap Blues", Digeri Dingo helps Taz when the Kee-Wee is wearing a rare bottle cap that it is wearing. In "Bird Brained Beast", the Platypus Brothers help Taz catch the Kee-Wee when they assume that he wants to keep it for a pet.
- The Bushrats are a group of bush rats in tribal costume that are led by a chief (voiced by Phil Proctor). They speak in an odd mix of real and nonsense languages that are appended by mismatched, humorous subtitles. Their favorite phrase is "Spanfirkel!", which is similar to the German word Spanferkel which translates to "small, young pig, which still gets suckled". On occasion, the Bushrats would run afoul of the other characters. In "Of Bushrats and Hugh", the Bushrats fight Taz and Hugh over their orange harvests. In "The Pied Piper of Taz-Mania", the Bushrats make their home in Hotel Tazmania causing Bushwacker Bob to order the Platypus Brothers to exterminate them.
- Willie Wombat (voiced by Phil Proctor), originally cast in a Bugs Bunny-like role against Taz, resents this typecasting and greatly admires Taz and his career. His determination to remain pacifistic and polite usually reverts to frustration and rage by the end of his episodes. Ironically, his friendly nature was previously used by Bugs in 1980's "Spaced Out Bunny".
- The Spies (variously voiced by Jim Cummings, Maurice LaMarche, and Rob Paulsen) are a group of unnamed spies with obscured faces who Taz, Hugh, and Drew run into in the "Road to Tazmania" episodes. As seen in two of the "Road to Tazmania" episodes, the Spies would go after the Tazmanian Devils when they obtain an item from a spy location's proprietor that another spy was planning to obtain.

=== Looney Tunes characters ===
The following Looney Tunes characters appear in this show:

- Bugs Bunny (voiced by Greg Burson), in "A Devil of a Job", appears as a deus ex machina, driving a souped-up jeep out of a quicksand pit, saving Bushwhacker Bob and Mr. Thickley. In Willie Wombat's debut episode, Willie phones Bugs for advice about how to handle Taz.
- Daffy Duck (voiced by Maurice LaMarche) is seen riding along with Bugs in the jeep in "A Devil of a Job" as their souped-up jeep emerges from the quicksand pit that Bushwacker Bob and Mr. Thickly were in. He tells Bugs "I told you this was the left at Albuquerque".
- Yosemite Sam (voiced by Maurice LaMarche), after Willie phones Bugs for advice, is called by Taz in "Wacky Wombat". He is never actually seen and expresses surprise that Taz has his own show by asking "Ain't you retired yet?"
- Sam Sheepdog (voiced by Jim Cummings), in one episode, was working as a sheepdog. Taz, working as a temporary agent for carnivorous predators, substitutes for Ralph Wolf and attempts to steal sheep from Sam's pen (a bit of character confusion was at play here, as at one point Sam suggests "I thought I was a bit too hard on that coyote last week").
- Foghorn Leghorn (voiced by Greg Burson), because of his name, was mistaken for hotel critic F.H. Leghorn by Bushwhacker Bob in "Gone with the Windbag".
- Beaky Buzzard makes a cameo in the show where he's seen relaxing on his nest.
- Marvin the Martian (voiced by Rob Paulsen) once comes to Earth on vacation in "The Man from M.A.R.S.", glad his plans to destroy it failed. His attempts at relaxation are thwarted by Taz's noisy behavior, cajoling him into wanting to destroy Earth again, and his actions indeed cause Earth to explode due to a temporal anomaly.
- Road Runner makes a cameo appearance in the show and is caught by Taz. Taz is then about to eat him, but lets the bird go after Axl and Bull try to kidnap Taz.
- Wile E. Coyote makes a cameo appearance in the show when he's being seen at the Boulder Museum.

== Episodes ==
Episodes are copyright 1991 (1–15), 1992 (16–47), or 1993 (48–65); note that this does not always correspond with when they originally aired. The series premiered on September 7, 1991, and ended on May 22, 1995.

Season	Segments	Episodes	Originally released	
Season	Segments	Episodes	First released	Last released
1	24	14	September 7, 1991	December 7, 1991
2	26	13	September 5, 1992	November 28, 1992
3	23	13	September 4, 1993	December 25, 1993
4	48	25	September 13, 1994	May 22, 1995

=== Season 1 (1991) ===
No.	Title	Directed by	Written by	Storyboard by	Original release date	Prod. code
1	"The Dog the Turtle Story"	Douglas McCarthy	Bill Kopp	Garrett Ho, Larry Scholl and Douglas McCarthy	September 7, 1991	406–401
Taz rescues a turtle, which acts like a dog, from a trap and adopts him as a pet, but then Bull Gator and Axl visit Taz's outback family and they all rescue him from the pair.
2	"Like Father, Like Son"	Keith Baxter	Mark Saraceni and Art Vitello	Garrett Ho and Larry Scholl	September 14, 1991	406–402
2	"Frights of Passage"	Keith Baxter	Keith Baxter and Bill Kopp	Douglas McCarthy	September 14, 1991	406–402
Hugh takes Taz out for a father-son bonding experience./Francis X. Bushlad of the Mudpeople sets out to hunt a Tasmanian Devil as his proof of manhood.
3	"War and Pieces"	Lenord Robinson	Mark Saraceni	Warren Greenwood and Todd Kurosawa	September 21, 1991	406–403
3	"Airbourne Airhead"	Lenord Robinson	Mark Saraceni	Kirk Tingblad	September 21, 1991	406–403
Taz and his younger siblings Molly and Jake are left to run the house while their parents visit Grandma./With help from the Platypus Brothers Daniel and Timothy, Taz attempts to climb Pointy Peak and to obtain giant bird eggs with which to make a Taz-sized omelet.
4	"It's No Picnic"	Greg Duffell and Gary Hartle	Mark Saraceni and Art Vitello	Greg Duffell	September 28, 1991	406–404
4	"Kee-Wee ala King"	Greg Duffell and Gary Hartle	Henry T. Gilroy and Art Vitello	Ennis McNulty	September 28, 1991	406–404
The Tasmanian Devil family heads out on a picnic, unaware that Bull Gator and Axl are looking to capture all of them./Taz and Buddy Boar go hunting for a Kee-Wee bird, which quickly turns into disaster for the pair.
5	"A Devil of a Job"	Douglas McCarthy	Gordon Kent	Garrett Ho, Larry Scholl and Charles Visser	October 5, 1991	406–405
Taz gets a job at the Hotel Tazmania to earn the money for a motorcycle.
6	"Battling Bushrats"	Keith Baxter	Bill Kopp	Filmarion Ferreira	October 12, 1991	406–406
6	"Devil in the Deep Blue Sea"	Keith Baxter	Bill Kopp, Chris Otsuki and Art Vitello	Chris Otsuki	October 12, 1991	406–406
Taz must protect his mom's turkey dinner from both the Bushrats and an army of ants. Despite his hatred of water, Taz is manipulated by Digeri Dingo to scuba dive into the ocean and find a sunken treasure.
7	"Woeful Wolf"	Lenord Robinson	Gordon Kent	Humberto Delefuente, Warren Greenwood, Audu Paden and Al Zegler	October 19, 1991	406–407
The neurotic Wendal T. Wolf looks to Taz for friendship, but Taz just finds him to be an annoying and needy pest.
8	"Devil with the Violet Dress On"	Gary Hartle	Gordon Kent	Daniel Danglo	October 26, 1991	406–408
8	"Kidnapped Koala"	Gary Hartle	Mark Saraceni	Gary Hartle and Gabi Payn	October 26, 1991	406–408
Jean insists on spending the day with her son Taz, for better or for worse. Bull Gator and Axl attempt to capture Constance Koala. Note: This episode was excluded from the first DVD volume Taz on the Loose.
9	"Mishap in the Mist"	Douglas McCarthy	Bill Kopp and Art Vitello	Garrett Ho	November 2, 1991	406–409
9	"Toothache Taz"	Douglas McCarthy	Bill Kopp	Larry Scholl	November 2, 1991	406–409
A woman studies the Tasmanian Devil family in their natural habitat. Taz gets a toothache and turns to the Platypus Brothers for help, but their cures end up being worse than the toothache.
10	"Here, Kitty, Kitty, Kitty"	Keith Baxter & Art Vitello	Chris Otsuki and Art Vitello	Keith Baxter and Flamarion Ferreira	November 9, 1991	406–410
10	"Enter the Devil"	Keith Baxter & Art Vitello	Henry Gilroy and Art Vitello	Victoria Jenson, Chris Otsuki and Al Zegler	November 9, 1991	406–410
Molly gets a cute cat for a pet, but this new addition to the family quickly becomes Taz's worst nightmare that he tries to eliminate. Mr. Thickly trains Taz to be a kung-fu master.
11	"Bewitched Bob"	Lenord Robinson	Gordon Kent	Warren Greenwood, Audu Paden, Lou Scarborough and Al Zegler	November 16, 1991	406–411
A new visitor to the Hotel Tazmania has Bushwhacker Bob wrapped around her finger.
12	"Instant Replay"	Jon McClenahan	Henry T. Gilroy and Art Vitello	Jon McClenahan	November 23, 1991	406–412
12	"Taz and the Pterodactyl"	Jon McClenahan	Chris Otsuki and Art Vitello	Chris Otsuki	November 23, 1991	406–412
Bull Gator and Axl film their exploits to learn the best way to capture Taz. Taz meets a living pterodactyl and is taken on a flight across the outback.
13	"Pup Goes the Wendal"	Douglas McCarthy	Gordon Kent and Art Vitello	Garrett Ho	November 30, 1991	406–413
13	"I'm Okay, You're Taz"	Douglas McCarthy	Mark Saraceni	Larry Scholl	November 30, 1991	406–413
Wendal Wolf kicks Dog the Turtle out of Taz's house and inserts himself as the new family pet. Buddy Boar tries to improve Taz's personality.
14	"Comic Madness"	Keith Baxter	Henry Gilroy and Art Vitello	Flamarion Ferreira and Victoria Jenson	December 7, 1991	406–414
14	"Blunders Never Cease"	Keith Baxter	Bill Kopp	Chris Otsuki	December 7, 1991	406–414
The family is worried that Taz is spending too much time with his comic books. Francis resorts to taking tribal potions in his quest to capture Taz.

=== Season 2 (1992) ===
No. overall	No. in season	Title	Directed by	Written by	Original release date	Prod. code
15	1	"Amazing Shrinking Taz and Co."	Keith Baxter	Bill Kopp, Art Vitello, Alan Swayze	September 5, 1992	406–418
The latest invention of the Platypus Brothers shrinks Taz, Bull Gator, and Axl to microscopic size.
16	2	"Oh, Brother"	Lenord Robinson	Henry Gilroy, Mark Saraceni, Art Vitello, Glenn Leopold	September 12, 1992	406–419
16	2	"Taz-Babies"	Lenord Robinson	Henry Gilroy, Mark Saraceni, Art Vitello, Glenn Leopold	September 12, 1992	406–419
A giant gorilla is goaded by his little brother to attack Jake, but Taz does not take his attacks lightly. Taz-Mania is presented to the network vice-president, who has his own ideas on what Taz's show should be like.
17	3	"Jake's Big Date"	Douglas McCarthy	Henry Gilroy, Mark Saraceni, Art Vitello, Mary Jo Ludin	September 19, 1992	406–421
17	3	"Taz Live"	Douglas McCarthy	Henry Gilroy, Mark Saraceni, Art Vitello, Mary Jo Ludin	September 19, 1992	406–421
Jake is set up on a play date with his friend Heather. When Hotel Tazmania is unable to deliver its scheduled comedy act, Taz and his friends stall for time with their own acts.
18	4	"A Midsummer Night's Scream"	Douglas McCarthy	Mark Zaslove, Art Vitello, Mark Saraceni, Timothy Williams	September 26, 1992	406–434
18	4	"Astro Taz"	Douglas McCarthy	Mark Zaslove, Art Vitello, Mark Saraceni, Timothy Williams	September 26, 1992	406–434
Lost in the mountains, Taz and Bushwhacker Bob are forced to spend the night in a creepy motel. Taz mistakes a space shuttle for an arcade game.
19	5	"Tazmanian Lullaby"	Keith Baxter, Art Vitello	Keith Baxter, Chris Otsuki, Art Vitello, Brenda Lilly, Kristina Mazzotti	October 3, 1992	406–437
19	5	"Deer Taz"	Keith Baxter, Art Vitello	Keith Baxter, Chris Otsuki, Art Vitello, Brenda Lilly, Kristina Mazzotti	October 3, 1992	406–437
19	5	"A Taz-Manian Moment"	Keith Baxter, Art Vitello	Keith Baxter, Chris Otsuki, Art Vitello, Brenda Lilly, Kristina Mazzotti	October 3, 1992	406–437
Francis discovers Taz's love of accordion music and uses it to capture him. Taz must compete with other predators over an adorable baby deer that he cannot bring himself to eat. In an "unused" scene from "Ticket Taker Taz", Molly uses her paddleball to scam Taz out of the concert tickets.
20	6	"The Outer Taz-Manian Zone"	Keith Baxter	Chris Otsuki, Gordon Kent, Art Vitello, George Atkins	October 10, 1992	406–422
20	6	"Here, Kitty, Kitty, Kitty - Part 2"	Keith Baxter	Chris Otsuki, Gordon Kent, Art Vitello, George Atkins	October 10, 1992	406–422
Taz and Molly switch bodies after an argument over their personal lives. Molly's cat returns, and the feline wastes no time in terrorizing Taz out of revenge.
21	7	"Taz-Mania's Funniest Home Videos"	Lenord Robinson	Bill Kopp, Henry Gilroy, Art Vitello, Bruce Howard	October 17, 1992	406–423
21	7	"Bottle Cap Blues"	Lenord Robinson	Bill Kopp, Henry Gilroy, Art Vitello, Bruce Howard	October 17, 1992	406–423
To win a trip to the Bora Bora Islands, Taz attempts to film some candid videos of his family. Taz and Dingo pursue a Kee-Wee Bird for the rare bottle cap it is carrying.
22	8	"Hypnotazed"	Douglas McCarthy, Jon McClenahan	Henry Gilroy, Gordon Kent, Art Vitello, Earl Kress	October 24, 1992	406–438
22	8	"Mum's n' Taz's"	Douglas McCarthy, Jon McClenahan	Henry Gilroy, Gordon Kent, Art Vitello, Earl Kress	October 24, 1992	406–438
Bull Gator accidentally hypnotizes himself into thinking he is a Tasmanian Devil. Taz and Mum get trapped in an abandoned mine shaft.
23	9	"Boys Just Wanna Have Fun"	Douglas McCarthy	Mark Saraceni, Gordon Kent, Art Vitello, Mark Young	October 31, 1992	406–417
23	9	"Unhappy Together"	Douglas McCarthy	Mark Saraceni, Gordon Kent, Art Vitello, Mark Young	October 31, 1992	406–417
With Jean and Molly out at a swim meet, Hugh, Taz, and Jake have a guys' night at home. Taz's presence ends up driving a wedge between the Platypus Brothers.
24	10	"Food for Thought"	Keith Baxter	Gordon Kent, Chris Otsuki, Art Vitello, Gary Greenfield, George Atkins	November 7, 1992	406–433
24	10	"Gone to Pieces"	Keith Baxter	Gordon Kent, Chris Otsuki, Art Vitello, Gary Greenfield, George Atkins	November 7, 1992	406–433
Taz attempts to cross a piranha-filled lake to grab an egg for lunch. Taz's game of bottlecap tiddlywinks ends up breaking his mother's valuable vase. He tries to hide the accident from Mom.
25	11	"Kee-Wee Cornered"	Lenord Robinson	Gordon Kent, Art Vitello, Bill Kopp, Wayne Kaatz	November 14, 1992	406–439
25	11	"But Is It Taz?"	Lenord Robinson	Gordon Kent, Art Vitello, Bill Kopp, Wayne Kaatz	November 14, 1992	406–439
Fed up with Taz eating all of her pet birds, Molly goes out and gets a Kee-Wee Bird. Taz quits the show out of anger for all of the abuse he takes every episode and gets a fast-food job, instead.
26	12	"Mall Wrecked"	Lenord Robinson	Henry Gilroy, Mark Saraceni, Art Vitello, Tony Benedict	November 21, 1992	406–415
26	12	"A Dingo's Guide to Magic"	Lenord Robinson	Henry Gilroy, Mark Saraceni, Art Vitello, Tony Benedict	November 21, 1992	406–415
When the car breaks down, Taz, Jean, and Molly are left stranded in an empty mall parking lot. Dingo uses a magic kit to trick the gullible Taz out of a giant gold nugget he found.
27	13	"The Man from M.A.R.S."	Doug McCarthy	Bill Kopp, Art Vitello, Sindy McKay, Evelyn A-R Gabai, Betty Birney	November 28, 1992	406–442
27	13	"Friends for Strife"	Doug McCarthy	Bill Kopp, Art Vitello, Sindy McKay, Evelyn A-R Gabai, Betty Birney	November 28, 1992	406–442
After hearing a scary sci-fi program on the radio, Taz attacks a vacationing Marvin the Martian out of fear that he wants to conquer the Earth. Dingo shares with Taz all of the adventures they have shared since they first met.

=== Season 3 (1993) ===
No. overall	No. in season	Title	Directed by	Written by	Original release date	Prod. code
28	1	"Wacky Wombat"	Gary Hartle	Sindy McKay, Mark Zaslove, Art Vitello, Jim Ryan, Glenn Leopold	September 4, 1993	406–440
28	1	"Molly's Folly"	Gary Hartle	Sindy McKay, Mark Zaslove, Art Vitello, Jim Ryan, Glenn Leopold	September 4, 1993	406–440
Willie Wombat is cast as Taz's foil in a semiparody of the original Taz cartoons. Guest starring Greg Burson as Bugs Bunny & Maurice LaMarche as Yosemite Sam. Taz gets roped into taking ballet classes with Molly.
29	2	"A Flea for Me"	Keith Baxter	Chris Otsuki, Art Vitello, Keith Baxter, Mary Jo Ludin, Tony Benedict	September 11, 1993	406–445
29	2	"A Young Taz's Fancy"	Keith Baxter	Chris Otsuki, Art Vitello, Keith Baxter, Mary Jo Ludin, Tony Benedict	September 11, 1993	406–445
Taz gets an unwelcome guest in his fur, a flea, which he tries to get rid of. Taz falls for a Tasmanian Shedevil, but is unaware that she is really Francis in disguise.
30	3	"Never Cry Taz"	Lenord Robinson	Bill Kopp, Art Vitello, Larry Markes, Bruce Howard	September 18, 1993	406–451
30	3	"Bully for Bull"	Lenord Robinson	Bill Kopp, Art Vitello, Larry Markes, Bruce Howard	September 18, 1993	406–451
The Platypus Brothers find the entrance to a new world in their attic during spring cleaning. Bull Gator falls into depression over his constant failures, leaving Axl to try to cheer him up.
31	4	"Of Bushrats and Hugh"	Doug McCarthy	Henry Gilroy, Art Vitello, Arthur Alsberg, Don Nelson	September 25, 1993	406–450
Taz and Hugh protect their precious orange tree from a hoard of hungry Bushrats.
32	5	"Merit Badgered"	Lenord Robinson	Henry Gilroy, Art Vitello, Barry E. Blitzer	October 2, 1993	406–443
Taz accompanies Jake on a camping trip.
33	6	"Devil Indemnity"	Gary Hartle	Gordon Kent, Art Vitello, Bill Matheny, Lane Raichert, Laren Bright	October 16, 1993	406–460
Taz is at home and stuck in a full-body cast. While he struggles to answer the phone and win a TV contest, Jean fills in for his bellhop job at Hotel Tazmania and struggles with Bushwhacker Bob's abuse.
34	7	"Willie Wombat's Deja Boo-Boo"	Lenord Robinson	Sindy McKay, Art Vitello, Gordon Kent, Barry E. Blitzer, Paul Dini	October 23, 1993	406–455
34	7	"To Catch a Taz"	Lenord Robinson	Sindy McKay, Art Vitello, Gordon Kent, Barry E. Blitzer, Paul Dini	October 23, 1993	406–455
Willie Wombat tries to get roles in other cartoons, but cannot escape being typecast as Taz's foil. Taz is framed for the consumption of a birthday cake, and Wendal T. Wolf is the police officer determined to catch him.
35	8	"The Thing that Ate the Outback"	Keith Baxter	Chris Otsuki, Art Vitello, Mark Zaslove, David Schwartz	October 30, 1993	406–449
35	8	"Because It's There"	Keith Baxter	Chris Otsuki, Art Vitello, Mark Zaslove, David Schwartz	October 30, 1993	406–449
Taz creates a blob monster with his new chemistry set, one that just keeps eating and growing. Taz and Dingo attempt to climb a mountain.
36	9	"Antenna Dilemma"	Gary Hartle	Gordon Kent, Art Vitello, Sindy McKay, Mark Seidenberg, Laura Numeroff	November 6, 1993	406–444
36	9	"Autograph Pound"	Gary Hartle	Gordon Kent, Art Vitello, Sindy McKay, Mark Seidenberg, Laura Numeroff	November 6, 1993	406–444
Taz visits the Platypus Brothers for some TV time when a thunderstorm cuts his cable. Constance is smitten with a wrestling champion staying at the hotel, but Taz is simply terrorized.
37	10	"Taz and the Emu Egg"	Keith Baxter	Chris Otsuki, Art Vitello, Sindy McKay, John Semper, Bill Allen	November 13, 1993	406–461
37	10	"Willy Wombat's Last Stand"	Keith Baxter	Chris Otsuki, Art Vitello, Sindy McKay, John Semper, Bill Allen	November 13, 1993	406–461
37	10	"K-Taz Commercial"	Keith Baxter	Chris Otsuki, Art Vitello, Sindy McKay, John Semper, Bill Allen	November 13, 1993	406–461
Taz hunts a surprisingly swift unhatched emu egg. Finally fed up with his typecasting, Willie Wombat takes his case to the network itself./Taz's "unique" singing talents are advertised as part of a CD collection.
38	11	"Doubting Dingo"	Gary Hartle	Henry T. Gilroy, Art Vitello, Alan Katz, Earl Kress, Mark Evanier	November 20, 1993	406–464
38	11	"Sub Commander Taz"	Gary Hartle	Henry T. Gilroy, Art Vitello, Alan Katz, Earl Kress, Mark Evanier	November 20, 1993	406–464
Dingo suspects that Taz is plotting to get rid of him. Taz places a mail order for a submarine, but the wait for its arrival tests his patience.
39	12	"Feed a Cold"	Doug McCarthy	Henry Gilroy, Art Vitello, Fred Freiberger, Jack Mendelsohn	November 27, 1993	406–462
39	12	"Sidekick for a Day"	Doug McCarthy	Henry Gilroy, Art Vitello, Fred Freiberger, Jack Mendelsohn	November 27, 1993	406–462
Taz is sick with a cold, and his sneezes become overwhelmingly powerful. However, the Platypus Brothers suffer the abuse of his illness even more when they try to find a cure for it. Bull Gator fires Axl and hires Taz as his new sidekick.
40	13	"No Time for Christmas"	Doug McCarthy	Mark Zaslove and Art Vitello	December 25, 1993	406–446
With everybody in Tazmania getting ready for Christmas, Taz makes a trip across the outback to deliver gifts to his friends.

=== Season 4 (1994–95) ===
No. overall	No. in season	Title	Directed by	Written by	Original release date	Prod. code
41	1	"Road to Tazmania"	Gary Hartle	Mark Saraceni, Kerry Ehrin, Ali Marie Matheson	September 13, 1994	406–416
Taz's Uncle Drew comes to visit, and Hugh and he take Taz along on a trip to pick up some orange juice. However, only Taz seems to notice the spies that apparently want the juice they bought.
42	2	"Taz-Manian Theatre"	Gary Hartle	Gordon Kent, Art Vitello, Bill Kopp, Mike Dirham, Cliff Roberts	September 14, 1994	406–420
42	2	"The Bushrats Must Be Crazy"	Gary Hartle	Gordon Kent, Art Vitello, Bill Kopp, Mike Dirham, Cliff Roberts	September 14, 1994	406–420
Taz and Wendal are stranded on a desert island in Mr. Thickly's thrilling tale of Taz-Manian Theatre. The Bushrats embark on a journey to retrieve their idol of worship – Jake's rubber duck.
43	3	"Return of the Road to Taz-Mania Strikes Back"	Keith Baxter	Mark Saraceni, Art Vitello, Barbara Levy, Marc Paykuss	September 15, 1994	406–426
With Taz as their caddy, Hugh and Uncle Drew head out to the golf course to play against a pair of old golfing rivals, whose own caddy is another sneaky spy who is out to get them.
44	4	"Taz Like Dingo"	Lenord Robinson	Henry Gilroy, Art Vitello, Harvey Bullock	September 16, 1994	406–427
Digeri Dingo finds a lamp that holds a genie. With his first wish, Dingo wishes for Taz to like him, no matter what, but this turns out to be a bad idea later.
45	5	"The Pied Piper of Taz-Mania"	Gary Hartle	Mark Saraceni, Gordon Kent, Harvey Bullock, Earl Kress	September 19, 1994	406–428
45	5	"The Treasure of the Burnt Sienna"	Gary Hartle	Mark Saraceni, Gordon Kent, Harvey Bullock, Earl Kress	September 19, 1994	406–428
Hotel Tazmania faces a Bushrat infestation. Bushwhacker Bob drags Taz on a treasure hunt.
46	6	"Not a Shadow of a Doubt"	Keith Baxter	Chris Otsuki, Art Vitello, Sindy McKay, Alan Burnett, Jeff Hall	September 20, 1994	406–429
46	6	"Nursemaid Taz"	Keith Baxter	Chris Otsuki, Art Vitello, Sindy McKay, Alan Burnett, Jeff Hall	September 20, 1994	406–429
Taz's shadow comes to life for a day. Dingo fakes a broken leg to get sympathy (and free food) from Taz and his family.
47	7	"Home Despair"	Doug McCarthy	Bill Kopp, Gordon Kent, Mark Saraceni, Earl Kress	September 21, 1994	406–430
47	7	"Take All of Me"	Doug McCarthy	Bill Kopp, Gordon Kent, Mark Saraceni, Earl Kress	September 21, 1994	406–430
Taz gets the Platypus Brothers to repair the house, but they only make things worse. Wendal pesters Bull Gator and Axl into capturing him so that he can relish the zoo life.
48	8	"Bird-Brained Beast"	Lenord Robinson	Henry Gilroy, Bruce M. Morris, Tony Marino, Rowby Goren	September 22, 1994	406–431
48	8	"Ready, Willing, Unable"	Lenord Robinson	Henry Gilroy, Bruce M. Morris, Tony Marino, Rowby Goren	September 22, 1994	406–431
Taz and the Platypus Brothers hit the road to catch a Kee-Wee Bird. Unaware of their true goal to capture Taz, Mr. Thickly lends his advice to Bull Gator and Axl.
49	9	"We'll Always Have Taz-Mania"	Gary Hartle	Henry Gilroy, Art Vitello, Bill Kopp, Mark Saraceni, Tom Ruegger, Barry O'Brien	September 23, 1994	406–432
49	9	"Moments You've Missed"	Gary Hartle	Henry Gilroy, Art Vitello, Bill Kopp, Mark Saraceni, Tom Ruegger, Barry O'Brien	September 23, 1994	406–432
With the TV broken, Hugh and Jean entertains the kids with the story of how they first met. Bull Gator and Axl host a show featuring "removed" segments from previous episodes.
50	10	"Sidekicked"	Douglas McCarthy	Mark Saraceni, Art Vitello, Bill Kopp, Gordon Kent, Barry O'Brien, Gary Greenfield	November 7, 1994	406–425
50	10	"Gone with the Windbag"	Douglas McCarthy	Mark Saraceni, Art Vitello, Bill Kopp, Gordon Kent, Barry O'Brien, Gary Greenfield	November 7, 1994	406–425
Axl is forced to hunt Taz on his own when Bull Gator leaves for the Tazmania Hula-Hooping Championship finals. Hotel critic F.H. Leghorn has come to the Hotel Tazmania, and Bushwhacker Bob is determined to get a passing review from him.
51	11	"Driving Mr. Taz"	Lenord Robinson	Gordon Kent, Bill Kopp, Art Vitello, Richard Merwin, Mark Young	November 8, 1994	406–435
51	11	"Mean Bear"	Lenord Robinson	Gordon Kent, Bill Kopp, Art Vitello, Richard Merwin, Mark Young	November 8, 1994	406–435
51	11	"Taz Museum"	Lenord Robinson	Gordon Kent, Bill Kopp, Art Vitello, Richard Merwin, Mark Young	November 8, 1994	406–435
Taz is taken out for a driving lesson. The Bushrats call upon Taz to defeat a cruel bear. The show advertises the Boulder Museum.
52	12	"Ticket Taker Taz"	Gary Hartle	Sindy McKay, Mark Zaslove, Bruce Howard	November 14, 1994	406–436
52	12	"Taz^{2}"	Gary Hartle	Sindy McKay, Mark Zaslove, Bruce Howard	November 14, 1994	406–436
Taz wins a pair of concert tickets, of which Molly wants to relieve him. The Platypus Brothers develop a cloning machine and use it on Taz, creating an army of Tasmanian Devils that are all hungry for platypus.
53	13	"Mutton for Nothing"	Keith Baxter	Chris Otsuki, Art Vitello, Keith Baxter, Bob Smith, Barry O'Brien, David Schwartz	November 15, 1994	406–441
53	13	"Dr. Wendal and Mr. Taz"	Keith Baxter	Chris Otsuki, Art Vitello, Keith Baxter, Bob Smith, Barry O'Brien, David Schwartz	November 15, 1994	406–441
Taz arrives at the sheep meadow to fill in for Ralph Wolf, where Sam Sheepdog performs his usual predator-pounding job on him. Wendal Wolf mistakes a gamma-radiation chamber for a tanning booth, causing him to transform into a violent monster whenever Taz gets him upset.
54	14	"Taz-Mania Confidential"	Lenord Robinson	Alan Katz, Art Vitello, Sindy McKay, George Atkins, Mark Young	November 21, 1994	406–447
54	14	"The Platypi Psonic Psensation Psimulator"	Lenord Robinson	Alan Katz, Art Vitello, Sindy McKay, George Atkins, Mark Young	November 21, 1994	406–447
A film crew has arrived to expose every humiliating detail of the Tasmanian Devil family, even those that they make up. The Platypus Brothers use their new invention to probe Taz's memories for "unused" episode segments.
55	15	"The Not-So-Gladiators"	Gary Hartle	Gordon Kent, Art Vitello, Sindy McKay, Carol Corwin, Kim Campbell	November 22, 1994	406–448
55	15	"One Ring Taz"	Gary Hartle	Gordon Kent, Art Vitello, Sindy McKay, Carol Corwin, Kim Campbell	November 22, 1994	406–448
Taz and Jean go on "Grub Gladiators" (a food-themed spoof of American Gladiators). Taz wants to join the circus, so Mr. Thickly "helps" him find an act.
56	16	"Retakes Not Included"	Gary Hartle	Sindy McKay, Art Vitello, Gordon Kent, Christopher Brough, Jim Ryan	February 6, 1995	406–452
56	16	"Pledge Dredge"	Gary Hartle	Sindy McKay, Art Vitello, Gordon Kent, Christopher Brough, Jim Ryan	February 6, 1995	406–452
The latest episode is filled with animation errors, and director Buddy Boar does not seem to grasp the concept of retakes. Mr. Thickly hosts a telethon to raise money for the show.
57	17	"Bushlad's Lament"	Keith Baxter	Keith Baxter, David Schwartz	February 13, 1995	406–453
57	17	"Taz-Mania Comedy Institute"	Keith Baxter	Keith Baxter, David Schwartz	February 13, 1995	406–453
An elderly Francis, still having not achieved his manhood, is forced to pursue an equally elderly Taz. A documentary on 16-ton weights is featured.
58	18	"Heartbreak Taz"	Gary Hartle	Gordon Kent, Bill Kopp, Glenn Leopold, Timothy Williams	February 14, 1995	406–424
58	18	"Just Be 'Cuz"	Gary Hartle	Gordon Kent, Bill Kopp, Glenn Leopold, Timothy Williams	February 14, 1995	406–424
Constance Koala develops a very one-sided infatuation with Taz. Francis is stuck watching his little cousin Edgar, so he takes him along on his hunt for Taz.
59	19	"The Taz Story Primer"	Douglas McCarthy	Alan Katz, Art Vitello, Mark Zaslove, Gary Marks, Brenda Lilly	February 20, 1995	406–454
59	19	"Ask Taz"	Douglas McCarthy	Alan Katz, Art Vitello, Mark Zaslove, Gary Marks, Brenda Lilly	February 20, 1995	406–454
Molly is called on by the network to provide the plot for the week's episode. Everybody seems to find great wisdom in Taz's frequent line "Taz hate water", so Bushwhacker Bob exploits it as a way to make money.
60	20	"It's a Taz's Life"	Gary Hartle	Gordon Kent, Art Vitello"	February 27, 1995	406–456
60	20	"Gee Bull!"	Gary Hartle	"Mark Zaslove, Rich Fogel, Fred Freiberger	February 27, 1995	406–456
Taz gets chosen by a TV host to have his life examined in retrospect. Bull Gator resorts to extreme teaching methods to knock some sense into Axl.
61	21	"Taz in Keeweeland"	Keith Baxter	Chris Otsuki, Art Vitello, Gary Warne, Ron Friedman	May 1, 1995	406–457
61	21	"Stuck for Bucks"	Keith Baxter	Chris Otsuki, Art Vitello, Gary Warne, Ron Friedman	May 1, 1995	406–457
61	21	"A Philosophical Taz Moment"	Keith Baxter	Chris Otsuki, Art Vitello, Gary Warne, Ron Friedman	May 1, 1995	406–457
Taz finds himself in a world filled with Kee-Wee birds, though it proves more dangerous than it looks. The need for immediate funds brings Taz into battle with his seemingly indestructible piggy bank. Taz contemplates nature and his enslavement for food.
62	22	"The Origin of the Beginning of the Incredible Taz-Man"	Keith Baxter	Keith Baxter, Henry T. Gilroy, Chris Otsuki, Gary Greenfield, Rich Fogel	May 2, 1995	406–465
62	22	"Francis Takes a Stand"	Keith Baxter	Keith Baxter, Henry T. Gilroy, Chris Otsuki, Gary Greenfield, Rich Fogel	May 2, 1995	406–465
Taz takes advice from Mr. Thickly on how to become a real-life superhero. Taz and Francis set up competing lemonade stands in hopes of making big money.
63	23	"Yet Another Road to Taz-Mania"	Douglas McCarthy	Henry Gilroy, Art Vitello, Charles M. Howell IV	May 8, 1995	406–458
Once more, Taz is stuck on a road trip with Hugh and Uncle Drew. This time, they are going bowling, and the spies are after their new bowling ball.
64	24	"Bad Luck Bottlecap"	Lenord Robinson	Sindy McKay, Art Vitello, Alan Katz, Steve Brasfield, Glenn Leopold	May 15, 1995	406–459
64	24	"A Story with a Moral"	Lenord Robinson	Sindy McKay, Art Vitello, Alan Katz, Steve Brasfield, Glenn Leopold	May 15, 1995	406–459
Dingo tries to get rid of a cursed bottlecap by passing it on to Taz, but his attempts continue to backfire. An injured Taz is being nursed back to health by an overbearing (and clumsy) Scotsman.
65	25	"One Saturday in Taz-Mania"	Lenord Robinson	Sindy McKay, Art Vitello, Mark Zaslove, Steve Brasfield, Timothy Williams	May 22, 1995	406–463
65	25	"Platypi on Film"	Lenord Robinson	Sindy McKay, Art Vitello, Mark Zaslove, Steve Brasfield, Timothy Williams	May 22, 1995	406–463
Taz's lazy Saturday is continuously interrupted by Jake. The Platypus Brothers critique their favorite movies (all of them Taz-themed parodies of famous films).

== Video games ==
Five video games based on the show were made, two by Sega for the Mega Drive/Genesis, Master System, and Game Gear, and three by Sunsoft: one for the Super Nintendo Entertainment System and two for the Game Boy.

== Episode status and home media releases ==
Three VHS tapes were released in 1993. After the show ceased running on Fox Kids, it was rerun on TNT, for a short time on TBS in 1996–1997 (before and after the Time Warner/Turner merger) as part of their Disaster Area block, and has also been rerun on Cartoon Network, making it the first Warner Bros. Animation series to air on that network. Its sister channel Boomerang started airing reruns of the series on July 15, 2023.

Reruns of the series currently aired on MeTV Toons since February 2, 2026, and then it was one of the 100 Warner Bros.-owned animated series that added to the Fox Corporation-owned FAST/AVOD streaming service Tubi on March 1, 2026.

A DVD containing the first four episodes of the series was released in Europe in April 2010, whilst later released in the UK in 2011 under the title "Taz and Friends" as part of the Kids' WB "Big Faces" series.

A DVD containing the 5 to 8 episodes of the series was released in Europe in July 2019, whilst later released in the UK in 2019 under the title "Taz and Friends, Volume 2" as part of the Cartoon Network "Big Faces" series.

On May 14, 2013, Warner Home Video released Taz Mania – Season 1, Part 1: Taz on the Loose on DVD in Region 1 for the first time. Season 1, Part 2 was released on August 6, 2013. On June 19, 2020, the third season was announced for a DVD release on August 25 under the company's Warner Archive Collection division.

Taz-Mania home video releases
Season		Episodes	Release dates
Season		Episodes	Region 1
1	1991	13 (excluded "Devil with the Violet Dress On" / "Kidnapped Koala")	May 14, 2013
2	1992	13	August 6, 2013

== Other appearances ==
- In the Duck Dodgers episode "M.M.O.R.P.D.", one of the forms that Duck Dodgers turns himself into is Axl Gator. In this brief appearance, Axl Gator's vocal effects are reprised by Rob Paulsen. Taz himself appears with Dodgers in the episode "Deathmatch Duck".
- Molly makes cameo appearances as a student of ACME Looniversity in the Tiny Toons Looniversity episodes "Skulls and Sillybones" and "Twin-Con".
