= Double Up (American game show) =

- Presented by: J. D. Roth
- Announcer: "Disco"
- Country of origin: United States
- Original language: English
- No. of seasons: 1
- No. of episodes: 7

Production
- Running time: 30 Minutes
- Production companies: Slam Dunk Productions; NBC Productions

Original release
- Network: NBC (Saturday mornings)
- Release: September 5 – October 17, 1992

Double Up is an American game show that aired on NBC Saturday mornings from September 5 to October 17, 1992. J. D. Roth hosted as well as being one of its executive producers. A rap DJ named Disco served as announcer. (Dick Clark Productions and MCA TV had produced a completely unrelated pilot in 1987 also called Double Up, hosted by Jamie Farr; the show was not picked up, but Farr was still promoted as being host of the show when he appeared during 2 "Game Show Hosts" weeks in 1987 and 1988 on the NBC game show Scrabble.)

== Gameplay ==
Two siblings attempted to find dates for each other. Each sibling had three dates to pick from, each identified by a nickname (for example, "Dude-Loving Dara" and "Jammin' Jason"). Each date sat on a collapsible seat suspended over a giant trash can full of confetti.

The sister would ask each of the three girls two Dating Game-style questions, and the brother would follow suit with the three boys. The siblings could hear their potential dates being interviewed, but could not see them.

After the questioning was done, each potential date would get a few seconds to explain why they would be the best choice. The audience would then vote on which date was the best. Each audience member would vote by writing the names on a slip of a paper, stuffing it inside a toy ball, and throwing the ball onstage.

After this, the brother would pick which date he thought was right for his sister. He did this by explaining why he didn't pick the other two, and pulling a lever that "dumped" them into their trash cans. The sister would do the same afterwards.

After the selecting was over, the audience's choices were revealed. If they matched one of the audience's choices, each sibling won $100 towards their dates. If they matched both of the audience's choices, they each won a larger date known as The Ultimate Night In Town (tickets to a rock concert, pro wrestling match, etc.) Regardless, both dates would be chaperoned by a limo service.
