= Brains & Brawn =

- Genre: Game show
- Presented by: Jack Lescoulie; Fred Davis
- Country of origin: United States
- Original language: English
- No. of seasons: 1

Production
- Camera setup: Multi-camera
- Running time: 30 minutes

Original release
- Network: NBC
- Release: September 13 – December 27, 1958

Brains & Brawn is the name of two similar NBC game shows aired on Saturdays (in different slots) in 1958 and 1993 respectively.

== First version ==
The first version of the show premiered on 13 September 1958, on the NBC system, airing Saturdays at 10:30 p.m. Eastern Standard Time. It was hosted by Jack Lescoulie and Fred Davis. There were two teams composed of two contestants each; two celebrity guests formed the "Brain" portion (hosted by Davis) and two other contestants formed the "Brawn" portion (hosted by Lescoulie). The complex structure of the show puzzled audiences and sponsors (it ran as a sustaining program) and was cancelled after just three or four months.

== Second version ==
Brains & Brawn
- Genre: Game show
- Presented by: Mark-Paul Gosselaar; Danielle Harris; Tatyana M. Ali
- Country of origin: United States
- Original language: English
- No. of seasons: 1

Production
- Camera setup: Multi-camera
- Running time: 22–24 minutes

Original release
- Network: NBC
- Release: July 10 – October 16, 1993

A second and final version was hosted by Mark-Paul Gosselaar, shown as part of NBC's teen-oriented Saturday morning programming and ran from July 10 to October 16, 1993.

Gosselaar's co-host in early episodes was Danielle Harris; she was replaced by Tatyana M. Ali, who was a team captain on a previous episode. "From the backlot of Universal Studios in Hollywood", the show pit two teams of teens against each other in fast-paced rounds of academic and physical challenges accompanied by music and special effects.

=== Format ===
Two teams of three teenagers, one of whom was a celebrity captain, competed. They competed in five events for points, which they would use in the Obstacle Course at the end of the show.

Games played include:

- "2-Minute Drill" – Each contestant stood at a lectern. Mark-Paul would read a question with three possible answers, and each one punched in what they believed was the right answer. The round lasted for 2 minutes, and each right answer won the team 10 points.
- "Hockey" – One contestant from each team played; one would be the goalie, while the other would try to hit balls with a hockey stick into their net. Each team had 30 seconds to score goals, and would earn 10 points for every goal.
- "Swing Shot" – Two contestants from one team had to throw balls through three large holes in a wall. However, a member of the opposing team sat on a pendulum swinging in front of the holes, and would try to block the balls as they flew past. Each team got 30 seconds to do this, and each ball that made it through a hole earned 10 points.
- "Oddity" – Each team faces an identical board, with ten rows of three items. One item in each row was the oddity that did not belong with the rest. Each team had 60 seconds to move the oddities into a column in the center. They received 20 points for each oddity correctly identified.
- "Volleyball" – The teams played a 3-minute game of volleyball, with 20 points awarded for each score. Two things made this game more difficult; first, each teammate was connected to each other with a bungee cord. Second, the net was a solid trip of fabric, so the ball could not be seen through it.

After five events, both teams went to the Obstacle Course. First, the contestants had to run through tires, then climb a fire escape ladder. Then, they had to slide into a large air cushion. After that, they cross a balance beam to reach a zip line. Then they enter a three-seater, pedal-driven buggy to pedal to the finish line. The first team to cross the line won the course and the game. The team in the lead received a head start; for every 10 points the team had scored over their opponents, they would receive one second.

Each member of the winning team received a Bushnell telescope.
