= Dean Edell =

American physician and broadcaster

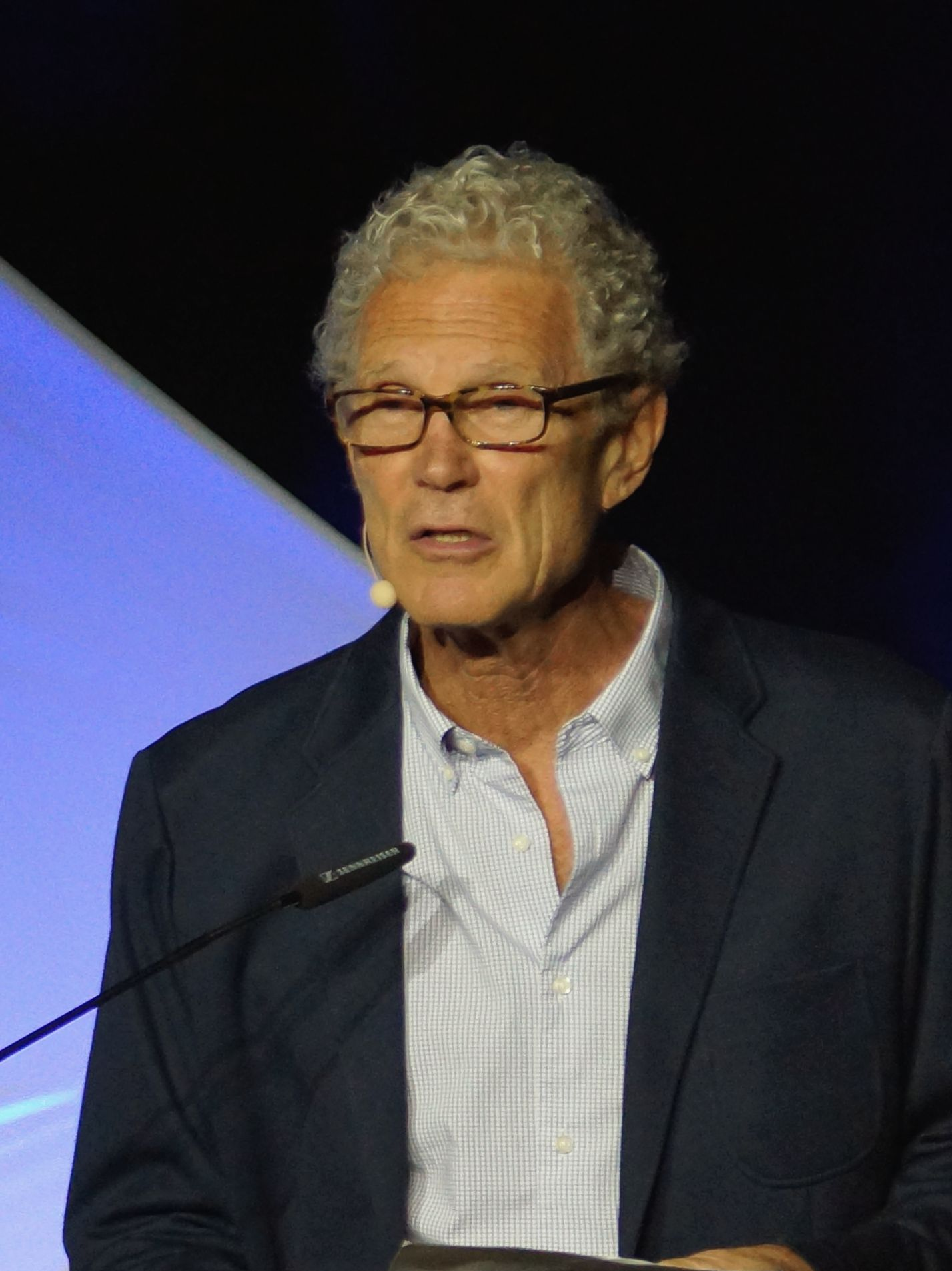
Dean Edell speaking in 2015

Dean Edell (born March 26, 1941) is an American physician and broadcaster who hosted the Dr. Dean Edell radio program, a syndicated radio talk show which aired live from 1979 until December 10, 2010. He was also nationally syndicated in television as a medical news reporter and host of his own television shows including NBC's Dr. Dean.

== Life and education ==
Dean Edell was born in Newark, New Jersey on March 26, 1941. His father was a vitamin manufacturer in the 1940s and 1950s. Edell studied zoology at Cornell University and earned his M.D. from Cornell University Medical School in 1967. He later opened a private ophthalmology practice in San Diego, California, and was an instructor of anatomy and a clinical instructor at the University of California, San Diego. Edell quit medical practice altogether in 1973. He later said that he "... didn't like medicine originally...I kind of found the thing I love the most, which is really the information and communicating the information".

He spent the next several years experimenting with lifestyles that included buying and selling antiques, working as a silversmith and goldsmith, organic farming, painting, living in a 1950s-vintage bus and engaging in a self-described hand-to-mouth existence that included scavenging for food thrown out by grocery stores. During this period he described himself as a hippie.

In the late 1970s, Edell worked for an antique auction gallery and also had a jewelry and antique shop of his own in Sacramento, California. To supplement his income he served as medical director of the County Alcohol and Drug Rehabilitation Center in Sacramento, California. A co-worker introduced Edell to the owner of country music station KRAK and suggested Edell try doing a talk show. He did six call in-shows for that station in 1978, launching his radio career. He moved to the San Francisco Bay Area in 1980, and lived in rural Mendocino County.

Edell collected Chinese art, Chinese snuff bottles, and rare books on anatomy. On October 5, 2007, Christie's held an auction of Edell's anatomy art collection.

Edell's sister is a Hollywood costume designer.

== The Dr. Dean Edell radio program ==
In 1979, Edell began broadcasting regularly on KGO radio in San Francisco. At that time talk radio had never been successfully syndicated. In 1986 Ed McLaughlin, then president of ABC Radio's failed attempt to syndicate talk radio, quit his job and teamed up with Edell. The show soon reached 350 to 400 markets with 8.5 million weekly listeners. They also launched Medical Minutes, 60 second medical news segments into 400 markets. McLaughlin proved radio talk shows could be successfully syndicated. He then turned his attention to a then unknown radio personality from Sacramento named Rush Limbaugh, who by summer of 1989 surpassed Edell in ratings and went on to become the most successful talk radio host in America. For most of the 90's Edell was the second most listened to radio talk show in America. By 2005, the Dr. Dean Edell radio program was syndicated to over 200 markets by Premiere Radio Networks, and aired weekday afternoons on America's Talk on XM Radio. The program was estimated to have 1.5 million unique listeners a week.

The program's format was unique. Edell answered personal medical questions from callers and included commentary on articles that appeared in medical journals as well as opinions about controversial medical issues. From the beginning of his career, Edell was a strong advocate for the scientific method and often criticized the media for unnecessarily publicizing unsupported health scares without proper scientific investigation. He was very concerned about the decline in scientific literacy in America. He railed against pseudoscience and magical thinking and was very critical of unproven alternative healing methods, the vitamin and herbal supplement industry, fad diets and diet pills, and many anti-science groups opposing vaccines, or fluoride or other scientifically accepted practices. He also questioned many mainstream medical practices like newborn circumcision, cesarean sections, hysterectomies, and the over-diagnosis of fad health maladies. He was an early supporter of medical marijuana and research into the therapeutic use of psychedelic drugs. He generally opposed the war on drugs. On December 1, 2010, Edell announced his retirement from radio. In 2010 Edell was named by Talkers Magazine to be among the 100 most important radio talk show hosts of all time.

=== Other radio and television broadcasts ===
From 1979, when Edell was the only physician in America employed full-time by a local television news station, until March 2007, Edell did nightly health reports for KGO-TV news, the local ABC station in the San Francisco Bay Area. These television news reports were syndicated nationally to over 100 local television news stations. He also did nightly live segments on KGO-TV news called "House Calls" during which he spontaneously answered live viewer call-in questions. He used his art background to draw explanations while he answered questions. This segment was also done live by satellite for KABC-TV in Los Angeles. He has now retired from these regular television reports.

In 1986, KGO-TV produced Dr. Edell's Medical Journal, a weekly live audience health magazine show, the first of its genre. The show was syndicated and also carried by Discovery Channel as well as PBS. It won the IRIS award at the National Association of Television Programming Executives (NATPE) in 1986 and was accepted into the permanent collection of the Museum of Broadcasting on April 11, 1988. Variety's review reported that "Edell is clearly charming, glib and informed."

In June 1992, NBC television network launched Dr.Dean, a half-hour daily television show, the first time an M.D. hosted his own daily network television show. The Hollywood Reporter described him a "Likeable, informed man with something to say." He hosted other television shows, Hey Dr. Dean, Calling Dr. Dean, and By Appointment with Dr. Dean all with varied success. He also hosted a quarterly series of TV specials called "Medical Breakthroughs Presented by HealthCentral", which are syndicated to local stations via the HealthCentral Company.

Edell provided on-camera commentary for the 1995 anti-circumcision documentary Whose Body, Whose Rights?, which was co-produced by PBS television station KCET.

== Publications ==
=== Periodicals ===
Edell was the author of the "Edell Health Letter", published from 1982 until 1994. Five years later the editorial staff of Healthcentral.com wrote articles based on his radio show topics on HealthCentral.com from 1999 until 2001 when the site went bankrupt and was sold to new owners.

=== Books ===
- The Brush & The Stone, Art Media Resources, 1999
- Eat, Drink, & Be Merry, Harper, 2000
- Life, Liberty, and the Pursuit of Healthiness, Harper, 2005

=== Websites ===
In 1999, Edell launched the aforementioned HealthCentral, a website featuring both personally authored content and general health-related information with the mission of "becoming your favorite consumer health information service." Edell lost his ownership position in this company when it filed for bankruptcy in 2001. The site is now owned and operated by Washington, D.C.–based The HealthCentral Network. The site no longer publishes new content by Edell, though his advice column and articles that predate the bankruptcy are featured prominently.

== Awards ==
Edell has won media awards for his work, including the C. Everett Koop Media Award, the Edward R. Murrow Award, a national Emmy, the American Cancer Society Recognition Award, and the American Heart Association Award. In August 2011 Dr. Edell was honored by The Independent Investigations Group with an 'Iggie' award for promoting science and critical thinking in mainstream media. In 1996, the Committee for Skeptical Inquiry presented Edell with the Public Education in Science Award.
