= List of Hang Time episodes =

Hang Time is an American teen sitcom that aired on NBC. The program first aired on September 9, 1995, and ran for six seasons, with its final first-run episode airing on December 16, 2000.

== Series overview ==
Season	Episodes	Originally released	
Season	Episodes	First released	Last released
1	13	September 9, 1995	December 2, 1995
2	13	September 7, 1996	November 30, 1996
3	26	September 13, 1997	December 6, 1997
4	26	September 12, 1998	December 5, 1998
5	14	September 11, 1999	March 11, 2000
6	12	September 23, 2000	December 16, 2000

== Episodes ==
=== Season 1 (1995) ===
The cast for the first season of Hang Time was:

- Daniella Deutscher as Julie Connor
- David Hanson as Chris Atwater
- Chad Gabriel as Danny Mellon
- Megan Parlen as Mary Beth Pepperton
- Robert Michael Ryan as Earl Hatfield
- Christian Belnavis as Michael Maxwell
- Hillary Tuck as Samantha Morgan
- Reggie Theus as Coach Bill Fuller

List of Hang Time season 1 episodes
No. overall	No. in season	Title	Directed by	Written by	Original release date
1	1	"Pilot"	Howard Murray	Story by : Mark Fink and Troy Searer & Robert Tarlow; Teleplay by : Mark Fink	September 9, 1995
New transfer Julie Connor tries out for the boys' varsity basketball team, something that is met with displeasure from team captain Chris Atwater and jealousy from his girlfriend Mary Beth, Deering High's head cheerleader. Meanwhile, Coach Bill Fuller tries to get used to his new job but has a hard time getting used to Samantha, the team manager. Special guest star: Alonzo Mourning and Francis "Chick" Hearn
2	2	"Trouble in Paradise"	Howard Murray	Mark Fink	September 16, 1995
As Mary Beth and Chris' six month anniversary approaches, she falsely assumes that Chris and Julie have feelings for each other. Danny fails every time he tries to tell Julie he has feelings for her. Meanwhile, Coach Fuller enlists Michael to help Earl stick with new diet.
3	3	"Full Court Press"	Howard Murray	Jeff Ferro	September 23, 1995
The press is all over the basketball team, because it's Julie's first game with the Deering Tornadoes. Her teammates begin to resent her because of all the attention she's getting. Mary Beth saves Earl's life and gets a pig in return. Guest star: Angelle Brooks as Roxanne Special guest stars: Willow Bay and Ahmad Rashad Note: Willow Bay and Ahmad Rashad co-hosted NBA Inside Stuff, a program for NBC that served as the bridge between TNBC and Saturday afternoon programming.
4	4	"Will the Real Michael Maxwell Please Stand Up"	Howard Murray	Cindy Begel	September 30, 1995
After Michael misses two free throws in a game Deering lost, he struggles with loss of self-confidence until he gets a visit from Detroit Piston's Grant Hill. When Samantha gives lessons to Danny on how to win Julie's heart, it's Samantha who falls for Danny. Special guest star: Grant Hill
5	5	"Oh Captain, My Captain"	Howard Murray	Robert Tarlow	October 7, 1995
Coach Fuller tries to mix up the team to improve their performances. Chris quits as captain because he doesn't like his new position of power forward, and Danny replaces him as captain. Meanwhile, Michael takes a job at Earl's farm.
6	6	"Earl Makes the Grade"	Howard Murray	Troy Searer	October 14, 1995
If Earl doesn't pass a history test, he can't play in the crucial game against Dover High. Meanwhile, Danny and Julie engage in a prank war. Guest stars: Julie Benz as Linda Cantrell and Michael Trucco as Tim Ritter
7	7	"Let's Get Ready to Rumble"	Howard Murray	Ken Kuta	October 21, 1995
Chris and Mary Beth's relationship gets worse, when Mary Beth goes out with an old classmate without telling Chris. Meanwhile, the team goes to Coach Fuller's house to watch a Mike Tyson fight on a Saturday, but Danny usually goes out on a date with Samantha on Saturday nights. Guest star: Trey Alexander as Charles Van Landingham
8	8	"The Candidate"	Howard Murray	Bernie Ancheta	October 28, 1995
Michael and Mary Beth run against each other for Student President. Michael plans to save Earl's "Future Farmers Club", while Mary Beth and her friends wants to replace it with the "Gold Card Club." Meanwhile, Chris and Julie make a bet on which one of the attractive female teachers will ask Coach Fuller out on a date. Guest star: Dominique Jennings as Miss Desiree
9	9	"Stranded"	Howard Murray	Jeff Ferro	November 4, 1995
The team argue after an unexpected loss, when a blizzard hits everyone, except Michael, gets trapped in the gym over the weekend. Mary Beth and Earl are the "parents" of a baby doll for a class project. Meanwhile, Julie tries to cool things off with Chris because "teammates can't be together".
10	10	"The Sweat Shack"	Howard Murray	Troy Searer	November 11, 1995
Mary Beth reluctantly gets a job at the Sports Shack store. Meanwhile, Earl falls for the new Russian exchange student, but Michael just wants a Russian babe.
11	11	"The Bachelor Pad"	Howard Murray	Mark Fink & Cindy Begel	November 18, 1995
When his parents go out of town, Danny stays with Coach Fuller. Samantha, the team manager, feels she isn't appreciated by the basketball team.
12	12	"Poetic Justice"	Howard Murray	Robert Tarlow	November 25, 1995
Earl inspires Mary Beth to write a poem when she founds out that Julie and Chris have been secretly dating. Guest star: Jazsmin Lewis as Teresa
13	13	"Game Day"	Howard Murray	Ken Kuta & Bernie Ancheta & Cindy Begel	December 2, 1995
Samantha looks back at the week leading up to the league championship game and the game itself. Julie is annoyed when Chris resorts to an old habit to play well in the league championship game - a good luck kiss from Mary Beth. Meanwhile, Danny has difficulties saying "I Love You" to Samantha. Note: This episode marks the final appearances of Samantha, Michael Maxwell, Chris and Earl.

=== Season 2 (1996) ===
The cast for the second season of Hang Time was:

- Daniella Deutscher as Julie Connor
- Chad Gabriel as Danny Mellon
- Megan Parlen as Mary Beth Pepperton
- Kevin Bell as Josh Sanders
- Michael Sullivan as Vince D'Amata
- Anthony Anderson as Theodore "Teddy" Brodis
- Paige Peterson as Amy Wright
- Reggie Theus as Coach Bill Fuller

List of Hang Time season 2 episodes
No. overall	No. in season	Title	Directed by	Written by	Original release date
14	1	"Winning Isn't Everything"	Patrick Maloney	Ronald B. Solomon	September 7, 1996
A new school year at Deering High begins and the basketball season is off to a shaky start, with the departure of last year's starting line-up freshman Michael Maxwell, and seniors Earl Hatfield and Chris Atwater. Mary Beth announces that she has taken the position of team manager from Samantha (who's at college in Chicago), changes Deering's basketball uniforms, and appoints a new lively head cheerleader, Amy. With the addition of newcomers Vince D'Amata and Teddy Brodis (Coach Fuller's godson) to the team, Julie, Danny and Mary Beth try to recruit the talented Josh Sanders, who's sworn off competitive sports. Special guest star: Mitch Richmond
15	2	"Just One of the Guys"	Patrick Maloney	Brett Dewey	September 14, 1996
Julie has a crush on new teammate Josh Sanders, but when she thinks boys don't notice her, she has an identity crisis and quits the team. Meanwhile, Danny, Teddy and Vince makes fun of the cheerleaders, and Mary Beth and Amy punish them by making every girl at the school stop talking to them until they apologize. Special guest star: Florence Griffith-Joyner
16	3	"Harvest Moon"	Patrick Maloney	Tony Soltis	September 21, 1996
The Harvest Moon Dance is coming up, and Danny is especially excited to be reunited with Samantha -- until he receives a letter that explains that she has found a new love. Mary Beth and Vince insult each other over their dates to the dance. Meanwhile, Teddy is convinced by Amy to be DJ for the dance. Special guest star: Cedric Ceballos
17	4	"The Sure Thing"	Patrick Maloney	Sheldon Krasner & David Saling	September 28, 1996
Teddy falls for one of the girls at the cheerleader tryouts. Josh is tired of Julie's constant "Baby talk".
18	5	"War of the Roses"	Patrick Maloney	Brett Dewey	October 5, 1996
Mary Beth paints the locker room pink, leading to a war of retaliations between Mary Beth and Vince. It gets so bad that the gang has to intervene. Julie doesn't want a surprise party for her birthday.
19	6	"Short Cuts"	Patrick Maloney	Tony Soltis	October 12, 1996
When Vince hears about a basketball training camp hosted by Coach Fuller and NBA star Muggsy Bogues, he is willing to do anything to get in, including taking steroids. The rest of the gang is filming an alien invasion movie, "Zeltoid Hunters". Special guest star: Muggsy Bogues
20	7	"Fake ID-ology"	Patrick Maloney	Ronald B. Solomon	October 19, 1996
In a flashback, the gang has been benched by Coach Fuller: they used fake I.D.'s to get into an over-21 club.
21	8	"When Loss is Gain"	Patrick Maloney	Noah Taft	October 26, 1996
The gang decide to each sacrifice an important personal item for a charity drive. Mary Beth gets mugged.
22	9	"Style Before Substance"	Patrick Maloney	Sheldon Krasner & David Saling	November 2, 1996
Danny is the only one interested in the mayoral election. Amy becomes interested when she sees one of the candidates. The basketball team challenges the football team to various contests.
23	10	"Son-in-Law"	Patrick Maloney	Tony Soltis	November 9, 1996
Mary Beth dates Vince to get her father's attention. The team has to beat undefeated Remington High to keep their play-off hopes alive. Special guest star: Juwan Howard
24	11	"Superman Brodis"	Patrick Maloney	Ronald B. Solomon	November 16, 1996
NBA superstar Theodore Brodis, Sr., Teddy's dad, moves to Indianapolis after retiring from the NBA. The team gets ready for a 3-point shoot-off. Guest star: Marques Johnson as Theodore Brodis, Sr.
25	12	"Green-Eyed Julie"	Patrick Maloney	Brett Dewey	November 23, 1996
Julie gets jealous of the new waitress, Nicole. Mary Beth teaches Vince to dance. Guest stars: Shannon Elizabeth as Nicole Barrett and Maggie Lawson as Kim
26	13	"The Best Game of the Season"	Patrick Maloney	Sheldon Krasner & David Saling	November 30, 1996
The game which decides if Deering makes it to the playoffs. Julie is made an offer to play professional basketball in Italy. Special guest star: Lisa Leslie Note: This marks the final appearances of Josh and Amy.

=== Season 3 (1997) ===
The cast for the third season of Hang Time was:

- Daniella Deutscher as Julie Connor
- Chad Gabriel as Danny Mellon
- Megan Parlen as Mary Beth Pepperton
- Michael Sullivan as Vince D'Amata
- Anthony Anderson as Theodore "Teddy" Brodis
- Adam Frost as Michael Manning
- Amber Barretto as Kristy Ford
- Reggie Theus as Coach Bill Fuller

List of Hang Time season 3 episodes
No. overall	No. in season	Title	Directed by	Written by	Original release date
27	1	"Team Captain"	Patrick Maloney	Jeffrey J. Sachs	September 13, 1997
New cheerleader Kristy Ford and new player Michael Manning both arrive at Deering. Julie is disappointed when the team choose Michael to be the new team captain. Mary Beth reveals that she kissed Ryan Parker at space camp. Note: This episode marks the first appearances of Kristy and Michael Manning.
28	2	"Sexual Harassment"	Patrick Maloney	Jordana Arkin	September 13, 1997
Mary Beth uses up the team's budget for the entire year to buy sport bags. Coach Fuller demands that Mary Beth raise back the money she blew; when her dad won't cover it, she becomes a waitress at Stadium. The situation gets complicated with her manager Tom, a former Deering basketball star, who begins to sexually harass her. The basketball team gets tattoos in order to show team unity for their upcoming season. Guest star: Jeremy Vincent Garrett (later of Sweet Valley High) as Tom
29	3	"First Game of the Season"	Patrick Maloney	Scott Spencer Gorden	September 20, 1997
Deering's new vice principal turns out to be Coach Fuller's ex-fiancée. The team is given detention two days before their game. The team's first game is facing Michael's former team, Lynwood.
30	4	"Fighting Words"	Patrick Maloney	Richard Albrecht & Casey Keller	September 20, 1997
After Danny gets into a verbal altercation with a bully, he takes up karate, as do Michael, Teddy, and Vince. The Montrose & Deering cheerleaders have a prank war.
31	5	"No Smoking"	Patrick Maloney	Peggy Nicoll & Barry Stringfellow	September 27, 1997
Coach Fuller is ready to drop Teddy from the team, unless Teddy is willing and able to give up cigarettes. Kristy has a run of bad luck after she walks under a ladder.
32	6	"Coach Fuller's Car"	Patrick Maloney	Richard Albrecht & Casey Keller	September 27, 1997
Coach Fuller needs someone to look after his beloved Range Rover while he's gone. He gives Julie, Vince, Danny, and Teddy a list of rules before he leaves the car in their care. Michael's band "Slam Funk" plays at a college frat party, with Kristy and Mary Beth performing as backup backup singers. Julie, Vince, Danny, and Teddy go to the party as well and enjoy some punch which turns out to be spiked.
33	7	"Julie's Guy"	Patrick Maloney	Carl Kurlander	October 4, 1997
Julie is dating a player from a rival team. Mary Beth tries to arrange a dinner so all the players can get to know each other. Kristy prepares for her driving exam. Special guest star: Glenn Robinson
34	8	"Playing With Pain"	Patrick Maloney	Todd J. Greenwald	October 4, 1997
A scout from the University of Arizona comes to see Michael. He hurts his ankle while practicing with Julie and tries to hide the extent of his injury. Kristy tries to teach Mary Beth the bones of the human body. Special guest stars: Peter Engel as the Commissioner, and Damon Stoudamire
35	9	"Not a D'Amata"	Patrick Maloney	Scott Spencer Gorden	October 11, 1997
Nicky, Vince's little brother, returns from France. Nicky now likes writing poems, something that Vince doesn't find suitable for a D'Amata. Guest star: Billy Sullivan (brother of Michael Sullivan who stars as Vince) as Nicky D'Amata. Special guest star: Gary Payton
36	10	"Kristy's Other Mother"	Don Barnhart	Jeffrey J. Sachs	October 11, 1997
The team goes to California to play in a tournament. Kristy finds out that her birth mother lives in California. The guys enter a game show, only to find out it's a dating show.
37	11	"The Hustlers"	Patrick Maloney	Todd J. Greenwald	October 18, 1997
In California, Julie and Teddy are the only ones practicing; the rest of the team goes with Mary Beth to watch for celebrities at their hotel. Julie and Teddy are targeted by professional basketball hustlers. Vince finds Mel Gibson's wallet. Special guest stars: Dustin Diamond as Screech, and Kobe Bryant
38	12	"Fuller's Rival"	Patrick Maloney	Todd J. Greenwald	October 18, 1997
Coach Fuller wants to beat his rival's team in the upcoming finals of the LA Invitational tournament. Julie and Kristy compete for the attention of a guy that works at the hotel the team is staying at.
39	13	"The Perfect Girl"	Patrick Maloney	Carl Kurlander	October 25, 1997
After she enters a modeling contest and loses, Mary Beth considers plastic surgery. Coach Fuller is a substitute teacher for cooking class, leading Danny, Julie, Michael and Teddy to assume (much to their regret) that it will be a cakewalk.
40	14	"Blood Drive"	Patrick Maloney	Jordana Arkin	October 25, 1997
Vince agrees to help Mary Beth organize the school dance. Danny offers to help Kristy with the school's blood drive. Michael doesn't want to ask Julie to the dance, because he can't dance. Special guest star: Shareef Abdur-Rahim
41	15	"Teen Mom"	Patrick Maloney	Peggy Nicoll & Barry Stringfellow	November 1, 1997
Danny starts dating a teen mom. Kristy gets addicted to a video game at the Stadium and misses the photo shoot that would put the girls on the cover of Girls in Sports Magazine.
42	16	"Midnight Basketball"	Patrick Maloney	Todd J. Greenwald	November 1, 1997
The gang volunteer for the teen line, where kids call in to get advice. Teddy receives a call from a teen who mentions he and his friends have nothing to do but sworp and wonder the streets. Teddy successfully proposes to Coach Fuller a Midnight Basketball program to keep kids off the streets. After a close game that Deering wins, the losing team trashes the locker room after the game. Meanwhile, Julie and Michael have feelings for each other but don't know what to do. They both call the teen line separately, but get some not-so-good advice from Danny and Mary Beth.
43	17	"Mary Beth's Parents"	Don Barnhart	Jordana Arkin	November 8, 1997
Mary Beth celebrates her birthday at a ski lodge, and finds out her parents are divorcing. Coach Fuller goes ice fishing to catch the "boss" bass fish.
44	18	"The Laugh Riot"	Patrick Maloney	Carl Kurlander	November 8, 1997
Danny has a dream of performing stand up comedy, and performs at the ski lodge's comedy club. Mary Beth loses an expensive ring she was given by Vince.
45	19	"Love on the Rockies"	Patrick Maloney	Richard Albrecht & Casey Keller	November 15, 1997
After Julie finds out that her ex-boyfriend Paul is staying at the lodge, Mary Beth convinces her to not tell Michael. Teddy, Danny, Kristy and Coach Fuller rescue a millionaire while skiing.
46	20	"Fuller's Camp"	Patrick Maloney	Story by : Jeffrey J. Sachs; Teleplay by : Peggy Nicoll & Barry Stringfellow	November 15, 1997
Coach Fuller has a basketball camp. The gang are counselors. There's only one girl there, so Julie tries to bond with her. Mary Beth receives love letters from one of the kids. Danny is terrorized by his group of kids.
47	21	"Kristy Connor"	Patrick Maloney	Richard Albrecht & Casey Keller	November 22, 1997
Kristy borrows a jacket from Julie, for whom Kristy is consequently mistaken by a cute fan of Julie's. Coach Fuller orders hamburgers for the team from Vince's uncle. They get a little more than they expected when a live cow shows up.
48	22	"Game Point"	Patrick Maloney	Jordana Arkin & Todd J. Greenwald	November 22, 1997
Kristy writes a paper on how sports can enhance personal relationships. She proves this by looking back on things that happened in the past seasons. This is the first clip show episode.
49	23	"Twister"	Patrick Maloney	Story by : Carl Kurlander; Teleplay by : Jeffrey J. Sachs	November 29, 1997
Teddy enters into a pizza-eating contest to win concert tickets. The gang is disappointed when they find out that the concert is on a work day. Coach Fuller receives a rare 1918 standing liberty quarter worth $5,000; he entrusts Mary Beth with the rare quarter, which proves to be a disastrous mistake when Vince uses the quarter to buy a soda. Special guest star: Sheryl Swoopes
50	24	"Goodnight Vince"	Patrick Maloney	Jeffrey J. Sachs	November 29, 1997
Vince loses his confidence when he misses a free throw during a game. Mary Beth searches for the perfect gift to thank Coach Fuller for a winning season.
51	25	"The Curfew"	Patrick Maloney	Richard Albrecht & Casey Keller	December 6, 1997
Coach Fuller sets a curfew for the team before their big game. However, Teddy meets a girl and is invited to her sorority's party. He goes to the party figuring that he'll stay for only a short while, and be back in time for Coach Fuller's head count at curfew, but then the gang notices that Teddy's not back yet. Julie, Michael, and Vince go to the party for Teddy. After Coach Fuller shows up at the sorority looking for them, all four teammates dress up like members of the opposite sex and sneak out, but Teddy still isn't finished talking with the girl that he's met. When everyone but Teddy makes it back before curfew, Coach Fuller benches him from the game. Teddy winds up becoming the first male member of Deering High's cheerleading squad.
52	26	"Fuller's Big Offer"	Patrick Maloney	Peggy Nicoll & Barry Stringfellow	December 6, 1997
The Tornadoes make it to the Indiana State Championship finals. Southern Florida University wants to hire Coach Fuller. The team is more worried about losing their coach than their game. Note: This episode marks the final appearances of Danny, Vince, Teddy, and Coach Fuller.

=== Season 4 (1998) ===
The cast for the fourth season of Hang Time was:

- Daniella Deutscher as Julie Connor
- Megan Parlen as Mary Beth Pepperton
- Adam Frost as Michael Manning
- Amber Barretto as Kristy Ford
- Mark Famiglietti as Nick Hammer
- Danso Gordon as Kenny "Silk" Hayes
- James Villani as Rico Bocso
- Dick Butkus as Coach Mike Katowinski

List of Hang Time season 4 episodes
No. overall	No. in season	Title	Directed by	Written by	Original release date
53	1	"A Whole New Ballgame"	Patrick Maloney	Jeffrey J. Sachs	September 12, 1998
Mike Katowinski replaces Coach Fuller, but the new team with Kenny 'Silk' Hayes, Rico Bosco, and Nick Hammer isn't coming together so well. The new coach treats Julie differently from the guys. Kristy gets a letter from Teddy saying that he and Vince are at the University of Southern Florida with Coach Fuller, Vince is dating Miss Florida Orange Juice and Danny is currently working on his stand-up at NYU.
54	2	"Team Players"	Patrick Maloney	Todd J. Greenwald	September 12, 1998
Michael talks about how bad the new guys are and is overheard by Hammer who tells the rest of the team, which causes a rift. Mary Beth tries to get into the good graces of Coach Katowinski.
55	3	"Let Them Play"	Patrick Maloney	Richard Albrecht & Casey Keller	September 19, 1998
The team finds out that a player on a rival team has HIV. After a "C" and "D" on two art history assignments, Kristy writes a mean letter to her art history teacher.
56	4	"Lend a Helping Hammer"	Patrick Maloney	Todd J. Greenwald	September 19, 1998
Hammer finds out that a waitress at the Stadium is homeless. Coach Katowinski wants the team to improve its agility and flexibility, so he calls in a ballet teacher.
57	5	"S.A.T. Blues"	Patrick Maloney	Renee Palyo	September 26, 1998
Hammer finds out that his S.A.T. scores aren't good enough to get him into any of the colleges that he had planned to attend. Kristy tries to convince Hammer to take the S.A.T.s again. Julie and Michael's anniversary is coming up and when Mary Beth overhears Michael talking about buying a Ruby guitar, she mistakenly thinks that he's buying Julie a ruby. Special guest star: Mitch Richmond (second guest appearance)
58	6	"Easy Credit"	Patrick Maloney	Richard Albrecht & Casey Keller	September 26, 1998
Silk racks up a large debt when he uses his new credit card. Julie is named Indiana state player of the month.
59	7	"Assault and Pepper Spray"	Patrick Maloney	Karen Russell	October 3, 1998
When Kristy is mugged in the parking lot of the Deering Plaza, she takes a self-defense class with Mary Beth and Julie. Rico, Silk and Hammer try to convince Coach Katowinski to use his extra Pacers ticket on one of them.
60	8	"High Hoops"	Patrick Maloney	David Garber	October 3, 1998
Rico starts smoking marijuana which causes significant problems for him and his friends. Michael, Mary Beth and Kristy take Auto Shop in hopes of getting an easy A.
61	9	"Love Triangle"	Patrick Maloney	Jeffrey J. Sachs	October 10, 1998
Mary Beth discovers that Kristy likes Hammer. She tries to set them up on a blind date, but Hammer thinks Mary Beth is trying to set herself up with him. Coach Katowinski organizes a school dance with help from the team.
62	10	"Texas Rose"	Patrick Maloney	Jeffrey J. Sachs	October 10, 1998
The team travels to Texas to play in the Tri-state final. Silk meets Rose. He sees her as she gets out of a limousine so he thinks that she's wealthy. Kristy meets a guy named Antonio who she thinks can only speak Spanish.
63	11	"Restless Mary Beth"	Patrick Maloney	Ron Solomon	October 17, 1998
In order for her to attend California University, Mary Beth needs to participate in more extracurricular activities. After Mary Beth joins the marching band, the debate team and the cheerleading squad, she finds out there's an election for a new student council president. Coach Katowinski gets a new hot tub to be only used for sports injuries but the team has other ideas.
64	12	"Shoot Out"	Patrick Maloney	Todd J. Greenwald	October 17, 1998
Coach Katowinski finds out that the coach of the rival team is his old assistant, who is now in a wheelchair. Kristy can't forgive Antonio for pretending to not understand English.
65	13	"Nothing in Common"	Patrick Maloney	Richard Albrecht & Casey Keller	October 24, 1998
Mary Beth gives herself a makeover to look more like a biker, to surprise Hammer. Coach Katowinski thinks about buying the Stadium.
66	14	"And Then There Were Nuns"	Patrick Maloney	Richard Albrecht & Casey Keller	October 24, 1998
Julie finds out Kristy has run off with Antonio to a wedding.
67	15	"The Tall and Short of It"	Patrick Maloney	David Garber	October 31, 1998
Rico is self-conscious about going out with a girl who is taller than him. When Mary Beth accidentally throws away Hammer's favourite jacket, she and Kristy try to find it before Hammer finds out. Guest stars: Bree Turner as Gail and Constance Zimmer as Lisa
68	16	"Just Friends"	Patrick Maloney	Karen Russell	October 31, 1998
Julie realizes that her feelings for Michael have changed. Mary Beth takes a job that makes her Kristy's boss.
69	17	"Sharing the Spotlight"	Patrick Maloney	Story by : Karen Russell; Teleplay by : David Garber & Todd J. Greenwald	November 7, 1998
If Julie doesn't get a good grade on her math exam, she has to be benched from playing.
70	18	"New Girl in Town"	Patrick Maloney	David Garber	November 7, 1998
A girl named Eve joins the gang, hoping to get noticed by college scouts. Eve starts getting jealous of Julie's ability to play.
71	19	"Rocky Road to the Playoffs"	Patrick Maloney	Todd J. Greenwald	November 14, 1998
Michael is afraid to tell his dad about his bad report card because he might not be allowed to play basketball anymore. Kristy and Mary Beth compete in a one-on-one basketball competition in order to win a car stereo.
72	20	"Kristy Nightingale"	Patrick Maloney	Story by : Jeffrey J. Sachs; Teleplay by : Richard Albrecht & Casey Keller	November 14, 1998
When Kristy takes a job as a nurse's assistant at the camp, she nearly kills Rico when treating his bee sting and loses all of her confidence. Julie and Mary Beth pull a prank on the guys to try and scare them.
73	21	"Phenom Blues"	Patrick Maloney	Jeffrey J. Sachs & Todd J. Greenwald	November 21, 1998
The team's first game on their way to the state championship is against the team with the best player in Indiana. When Mary Beth convinces Kristy to play in a pool tournament to win a present for the coach, she ends up facing him in the finals.
74	22	"New York Nick"	Patrick Maloney	Brett Dewey	November 22, 1998
The Deering team travel to New York after winning a trip. Hammer looks up an old girlfriend, and Mary Beth feels jealous. Rico, Silk and Michael get into a food fight at a New York Knicks game.
75	23	"Breaks of the Game"	Patrick Maloney	Richard Albrecht & Casey Keller	November 28, 1998
The Tornadoes make it to the state championship finals, but Hammer gets benched when he tests positive for steroids. Hammer says he's never taken steroids, but Silk and Rico refuse to believe him and this affects their performance in the state finals. Kristy meets an artist who asks her to pose for him.
76	24	"Window of Opportunity"	Patrick Maloney	Richard Albrecht & Casey Keller	November 28, 1998
Mary Beth works at a department store to come up with ideas for the teen department. She is shocked when her boss takes credit for her ideas. Coach plays Santa Claus at the mall, with Rico, Silk, Hammer & Michael as elves.
77	25	"Christmas in New York"	Patrick Maloney	Jeffrey J. Sachs	December 5, 1998
In New York, Rico meets his grandfather, who wants to spend Christmas with him. Rico is embarrassed by him and lies to him, saying the team won't be around the city during the holidays.
78	26	"Waiting for Mary Beth"	Patrick Maloney	David Garber	December 5, 1998
The Deering gang reminisce about the past year. A famous hairdresser ruins Mary Beth's hair. This is the second clip show.

=== Season 5 (1999–2000) ===
Seasons 5 and 6 of Hang Time were filmed together as a single production, so the cast for the fifth and sixth seasons of Hang Time was the same:

- Daniella Deutscher as Julie Connor
- Megan Parlen as Mary Beth Pepperton
- Adam Frost as Michael Manning
- Amber Barretto as Kristy Ford
- Danso Gordon as Kenny "Silk" Hayes
- Phillip Glasser as Eugene Brown
- Jay Hernandez as Antonio Lopez
- Dick Butkus as Coach Mike Katowinski

List of Hang Time season 5 episodes
No. overall	No. in season	Title	Directed by	Written by	Original release date
79	1	"Hello and Goodbye"	Miguel Higuera	Jeffrey J. Sachs	September 11, 1999
Hammer is forced to leave the team and Mary Beth when he is offered an out of state scholarship. Antonio moves from Texas to be with Kristy. Eugene Brown replaces Rico, who joined the wrestling team. Note: This marked the first appearance of Eugene Brown.
80	2	"Managing Michael"	Miguel Higuera	Rob Hammersley	September 18, 1999
Mary Beth becomes the manager for Michael's band "Slam Funk". The team thinks the coach is leaving to take another job. Special guest stars: The Moffatts
81	3	"Beer Pressure"	Miguel Higuera	Mark Scherzer	October 2, 1999
Julie starts dating an older guy, who constantly encourages her to do mature things. Coach Katowinski rents out an apartment to Antonio.
82	4	"Extreme Eugene"	Miguel Higuera	Troy Searer	October 9, 1999
Eugene starts liking skateboards, and acts like it is more important than basketball. Kristy is apprehensive about her parents meeting Antonio. Special guest star: Biker Sherlock
83	5	"Too Good to be True"	Miguel Higuera	Richard Albrecht & Casey Keller	October 16, 1999
Michael meets a man after a basketball game and gets both a loan and a job. Julie finds out the man is a college recruiter, and becomes worried Michael may have become ineligible to play college basketball. Coach Katowinski purchases a telescope, but breaks the lens the day before a rare comet appears.
84	6	"Shall We Dance?"	Miguel Higuera	Jay J. Demopoulos	October 23, 1999
Julie and Antonio decide to enter a swing dancing competition together. Mary Beth thinks that there is more than dancing going on between the two. Silk and Eugene set up pranks to catch on video. Special guest stars: Dr. Drew Pinsky and Atomic Fireballs
85	7	"Joint Venture"	Miguel Higuera	Richard Albrecht & Casey Keller	October 30, 1999
Eugene and Silk become co-managers for a new dance club. Kristy and Mary Beth go undercover to buy drugs from a dealer in order to get spots in the newspaper.
86	8	"Revolver, Problem Solver?"	Miguel Higuera	Richard Albrecht & Casey Keller	November 6, 1999
A vengeful criminal named Eric terrorizes Silk. Silk starts getting nervous so he arms himself with a gun.
87	9	"Tolerance"	Miguel Higuera	Richard Albrecht & Casey Keller	November 13, 1999
Kristy becomes lab partners with Syd, a Grote. She dresses up as a Grote to get to know them better. Eugene lies to a college girl, telling her that he also attends college.
88	10	"Big Brother Blues"	Miguel Higuera	Rob Hammersley	November 20, 1999
Michael and Silk sign up for a big brother program. They get assigned to a boy named Daniel. Silk doesn't have the chance to meet Daniel's mother but when Michael meets her, she says that she's glad that her son got the right kind of big brother: a white male.
89	11	"Finals Fury"	Miguel Higuera	Rob Hammersley	November 27, 1999
The team travels to the state finals. Antonio meets up with some friends at a fraternity party. Kristy gets jealous when she finds out there were other girls there. Michael is harassed by a guy in the stands.
90	12	"The Upset"	Miguel Higuera	Rob Hammersley & Troy Searer	December 4, 1999
The team is overly confident when they find out that the team that they are playing against in the Indiana State Championship finals is one which is generally considered easy to beat. Kristy and Mary Beth try to make it up to an old classmate whom they used to tease but instead they just end up getting humiliated. Special guest star: Tim Hardaway
91	13	"Fighting for Your Dreams"	Miguel Higuera	Troy Searer	January 8, 2000
The University of Kentucky offers Antonio a scholarship, but he suffers an injury and declines it. Mary Beth can't get over Hammer's departure.
92	14	"My Family"	Miguel Higuera	Rob Hammersley & Mark Scherzer	March 11, 2000
Coach doesn't know that his 17-year-old daughter, visiting from Chicago, had a baby. The guys try to sell pagers to raise money for a ski trip.

=== Season 6 (2000) ===
As season 6 of Hang Time was filmed together with season 5 as a single production, the cast for the sixth season of Hang Time was the same as the cast for the fifth season.

List of Hang Time season 6 episodes
No. overall	No. in season	Title	Directed by	Written by	Original release date
93	1	"www.eugene.trouble.com"	Miguel Higuera	Jeffrey J. Sachs	September 23, 2000
Eugene starts gambling online. Kristy is supposed to be interviewed by Stanford University, but she has a dental problem that makes it difficult to speak so Mary Beth takes her place.
94	2	"That '60s Show"	Miguel Higuera	Rob Hammersley & Mark Scherzer	September 30, 2000
Mr. McHenry, who has just won a Teacher of the Year award, encourages the students to rebel against a newly enforced dress code. The dress code is overturned but Mr. McHenry is fired. Eugene, Kristy and Mary Beth pool their money together to try to win the lotto. Mary Beth and Kristy end up getting detention for the first time ever and then they keep getting more and more detentions. Special guest star: Alan Young as Mr. McHenry
95	3	"The Gospel According to Silk"	Miguel Higuera	Jeffrey J. Sachs	October 7, 2000
Silk loses his faith when his aunt Charlotte dies. Mary Beth and Coach Katowinski are the last two contestants competing in a fundraising competition where the person who stays the longest inside a VW Beetle wins. Special guest star: Jennifer Holliday as Charlotte Hayes
96	4	"The Enforcer"	Miguel Higuera	Troy Searer	October 14, 2000
The coach tells Julie to toughen up before the next game but she ends up injuring a player who was destined to play in the NBA. She loses her confidence and gets benched for the next game. An ATM spits out $1000, when Kristy only asks for $20. When Mary Beth and Kristy decide to keep the money, they have a run of bad luck. Guest star: Riley Smith as Dave Carter
97	5	"Have No Fear"	Miguel Higuera	Troy Searer	October 21, 2000
Silk receives a basketball scholarship from Temple University, but worries he won't keep his grades up and be a successful player in college. Julie and Kristy decide to buy a car together.
98	6	"At the Movies"	Miguel Higuera	Jay J. Demopoulos	October 28, 2000
Kristy and Antonio enjoy working together at the local cinema until a promotion becomes available. Mary Beth has a romantic dream about Eugene. Special guest star: Dustin Diamond (second guest appearance as Screech)
99	7	"Life 101"	Miguel Higuera	Mark Scherzer	November 4, 2000
Hammer drops out of Duke to attend UCLA with Mary Beth and Kristy, but he isn't accepted, forcing Mary Beth to choose between Hammer and Kristy. The guys accidentally lose Coach Katowinski's dog while taking him for a walk.
100	8	"Secrets and Lies"	Miguel Higuera	Jeffrey J. Sachs	November 11, 2000
Mary Beth meets a guy while working on an article. Although he initially seems nice, he tries to rape her. Two girls try to sabotage Eugene and Silk's game.
101	9	"For the Love of the Game"	Miguel Higuera	Richard Albrecht & Casey Keller	November 18, 2000
Though the team is one game away from an undefeated season, Coach Katowinski is concerned that their playing has become tentative and that they fear losing more than they desire winning. He gets them to remember what it was like when they played basketball for fun. Julie is accepted by the University of Connecticut.
102	10	"A Night to Remember"	Miguel Higuera	Richard Albrecht & Casey Keller	December 2, 2000
The gang work on setting up the gym for the prom. However, the girls lose the prom money and on the night of the prom, they end up wearing the same dress. Mary Beth and Silk end up with horrible dates but Eugene still tries to find a date. A tornado hits the Deering area.
103	11	"High School Confidential"	Miguel Higuera	Mark Scherzer & Jay J. Demopoulos	December 9, 2000
Mary Beth and Kristy interview the rest of the gang about their best and worst moments. This is the third and final clip show.
104	12	"Graduation on Three"	Miguel Higuera	Jeffrey J. Sachs	December 16, 2000
The gang prepare to take a final glance at their time spent at Deering over the years. Kristy is worried that after they graduate, the gang will never see each other again.
