= Haven (Star Trek: The Next Generation) =

- Star Trek: The Next Generation episode
- Episode no.: Season 1 Episode 11
- Directed by: Richard Compton
- Story by: Tracy Tormé; Lan O'Kun
- Teleplay by: Tracy Tormé
- Production code: 105
- Original air date: November 30, 1987

Guest appearances
- Majel Barrett – Lwaxana Troi; Robert Knepper – Wyatt Miller; Nan Martin – Victoria Miller; Robert Ellenstein – Steven Miller; Carel Struycken – Mr. Homn; Anna Katarina – Valeda Innis; Raye Birk – Wrenn; Danitza Kingsley – Ariana; Armin Shimerman - Betazoid gift box; Michael Rider – Transporter Chief

Episode chronology
| ← Previous "Hide and Q" | Next → "The Big Goodbye" |
- Star Trek: The Next Generation season 1

"Haven" is the eleventh episode of the first season of the American science fiction television series Star Trek: The Next Generation, originally aired on November 30, 1987, in broadcast syndication in the United States. Directed by Richard Compton, the story was originally created by Lan O'Kun, and developed into the final script by Tracy Tormé.

Set in the 24th century, the series follows the adventures of the Starfleet crew of the Federation starship Enterprise-D. In this episode, Deanna Troi (Marina Sirtis) deals with the commitment of an arranged marriage after the arrival of the wedding party, including her mother Lwaxana (Majel Barrett). Meanwhile, the Enterprise must deal with a plague ship approaching a paradisiacal planet.

The episode marked the first appearance of several guest actors in The Next Generation, including Barrett and Carel Struycken. Tormé disliked the final version of the episode, and the critical response to the episode was mixed, with the performance of Barrett both praised and criticised.

== Plot ==
The Federation starship Enterprise arrives at the planet Haven, where the ship's Betazoid Counselor Deanna Troi has been summoned by her mother Lwaxana. Troi had previously been set into an arranged marriage to the young human doctor, Wyatt Miller (Robert Knepper), and his parents have since tracked down Lwaxana to enforce the marriage. After Lwaxana and the Millers are welcomed aboard the Enterprise, the parents argue over whose cultural traditions will be honored at the ceremony. Troi and Wyatt attempt to get to know each other but find it difficult, as Troi is still in love with Commander William Riker (Jonathan Frakes). Wyatt has had numerous dreams of another woman with whom he has fallen in love, and had initially believed her to be Troi communicating telepathically with him.

The Enterprise then learns of an unmarked vessel approaching Haven. Captain Picard (Patrick Stewart) recognizes it as Tarellian, a race thought to have been wiped out by a highly lethal and contagious virus. When they contact the ship, they find a handful of Tarellian refugees who have been traveling at sub-light speeds to Haven in hopes of finding an isolated location to live out the rest of their lives in peace. Picard insists that they cannot go to the planet for fear of spreading the virus, and has the Tarellian vessel placed in a tractor beam. Wyatt recognizes one of the Tarellians, Ariana (Danitza Kingsley), from his dreams, and she too recognizes him. He tells Dr. Crusher (Gates McFadden) that he will transport some medical supplies to them, but transports himself along with the supplies. When the crew discovers this, Wyatt's parents demand that Picard bring Wyatt back to the Enterprise, but Troi insists that he cannot return, as he would now carry the Tarellian virus. Wyatt tells his parents, Troi, and the rest of the crew that he knew this was his destiny and is happy to try to help cure the Tarellians. He convinces the Tarellians to leave Haven and search for help elsewhere. Picard orders the tractor beam to be dropped and allows the vessel to depart the system.

== Production ==
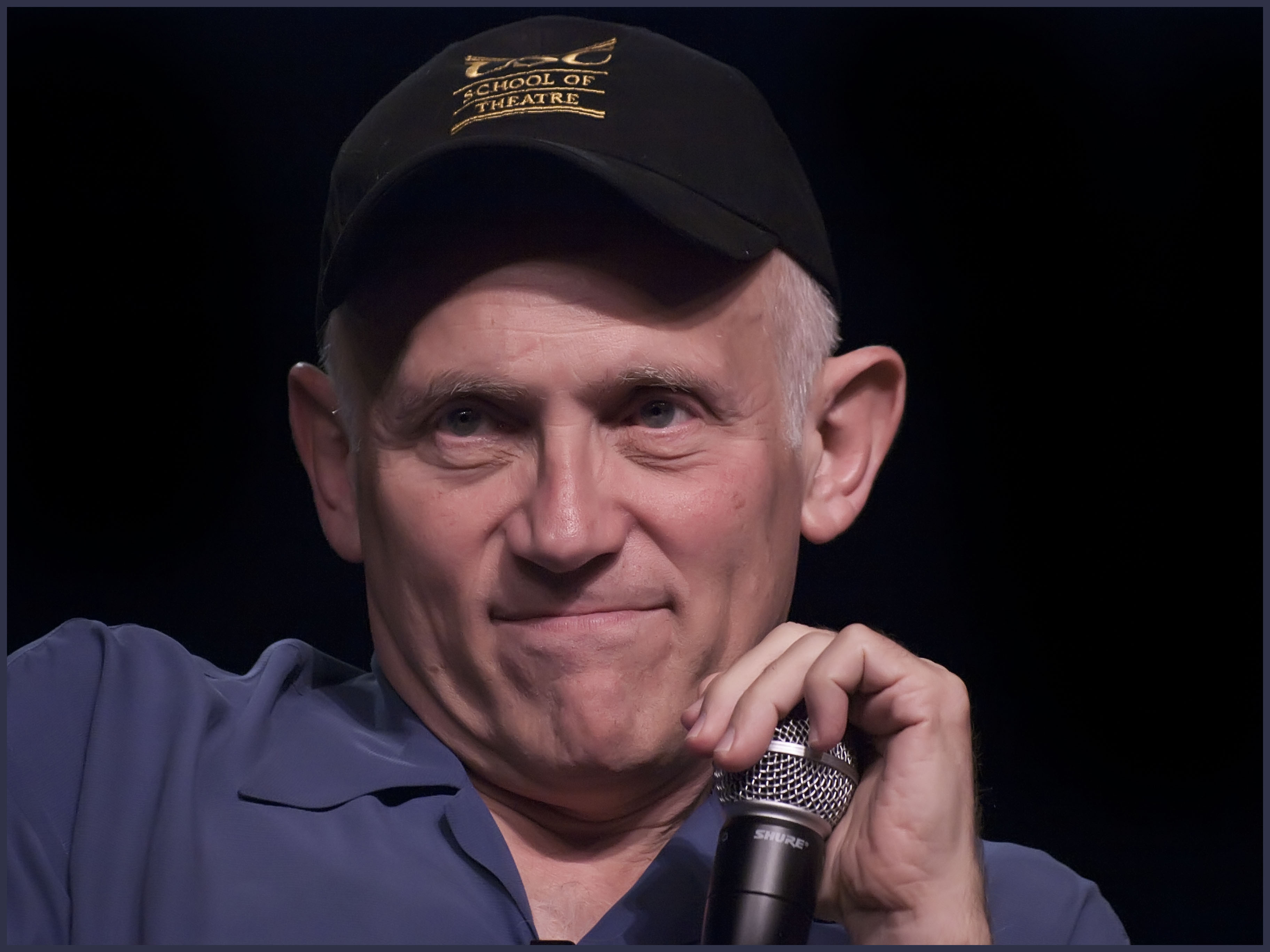
Armin Shimerman made his Star Trek debut in "Haven", although his subsequent appearance in "The Last Outpost" was aired first.

The episode's plot originated from one which Lan O'Kun submitted entitled "Love Beyond Time and Space", although at one point, the episode was called "Eye of the Beholder". O'Kun's script was on the verge of being cut from the show when it was handed to Tracy Tormé for re-writes. Tormé later described it as a "no-lose" situation as he felt that O'Kun's script was so bad anything would be an improvement. Tormé changed the script from O'Kun's serious outline to something more comedic, although he felt that a lot of the comedy elements were later removed before filming. He didn't like the overall result, saying "I didn't particularly like the episode when it first aired. It's still one of my least favourite shows that I've been involved with". Because of the work on the episode, Tormé was recruited as executive story editor.

The episode was directed by Richard Compton, who had previously appeared as Lieutenant Washburn in The Original Series episode "The Doomsday Machine". "Haven" began filming twenty years to the day after Compton filmed his scenes in "The Doomsday Machine". Dennis McCarthy composed the music for "Haven", which was so strongly disliked by supervising producer Rick Berman that McCarthy thought he might be fired. "Haven" was the fifth episode to be filmed, but was broadcast as the eleventh episode.

"Haven" marked the first appearance of Majel Barrett as Lwaxana Troi. She had previously appeared as Number One in the first Star Trek pilot, "The Cage", and as Christine Chapel in Star Trek: The Original Series and movies. She would go on to re-appear as Lwaxana on average once per season for the rest of the run of The Next Generation. Dutch actor Carel Struycken also made his first appearance as Mr. Homn in "Haven", which also marked the only time during his several appearances alongside Barrett that he had a line of dialogue. Robert Ellenstein appeared as Steven Miller; he had previously appeared as the Federation President in Star Trek IV: The Voyage Home. "Haven" also marked the first filmed appearance of another actor who would regularly appear in the Star Trek franchise. Armin Shimerman appeared as the face of the Betazoid gift box in this episode. This was his first filmed appearance, but his first broadcast appearance was as the Ferengi Letek in "The Last Outpost". He would later appear as the Ferengi Bractor in the season two episode "Peak Performance" before being cast once more as a Ferengi, but this time in the main cast, as Quark in Star Trek: Deep Space Nine.

The Tarellian spacecraft seen in this episode was developed by Andrew Probert. He collaborated with Gene Roddenberry on this design, which helped develop the idea of putting the ship's power plant in the center of the spacecraft. Probert commented on the work with Roddenberry: "I was just very pleased with the shape, the concept, it brings me good memories of Gene and me working together".

== Reception ==
"Haven" aired in broadcast syndication during the week commencing November 29, 1987. It received Nielsen ratings of 10.3, reflecting the percentage of all households watching the episode during its timeslot. This was the lowest ratings received by the series since "The Last Outpost" six episodes earlier.

Several reviewers re-watched the episode after the end of the series. Cast member Wil Wheaton watched the episode for AOL TV in May 2007, saying that "this could have been an absolutely dreadful 'shotgun wedding' episode that was as predictable as it was tedious, but Tracy's script, aided by very good guest star casting and great acting from everyone involved, made it one of the better episodes in season one." He gave the episode a grade of B. James Hunt, for the website Den of Geek, watched the episode in November 2012. While he was mostly negative of the episode, saying that "Troi episodes tend to test the patience of even the most devoted Trek fan", he said that "Haven" marked the first time that the series would "properly execute the idea that TNG episodes can have an A and B plot which dovetail nicely in the final act".

Keith DeCandido reviewed the episode for Tor.com in June 2011. He described the episode as "painful to watch" and one that where "all the worst sci-fi TV show clichés are in evidence". He criticised the out of date sexist values of the plot in which Troi would have been forced to leave the ship to be with Wyatt. He did praise the appearance of Majel Barett, describing her as "ever-radiant" and the "saving grace of the episode". He gave it a score of three out of ten. Zack Handlen watched the episode for The A.V. Club in April 2010. He described Majel Barrett as "agonizing" and the episode was "full of lazy shoulder shrugs and half-finished ideas". He gave the episode a grade of D.

In 2019, Den of Geek noted this episode for featuring romantic elements.

== Home media release ==
The first home media release of "Haven" was on VHS cassette, appearing on April 1, 1992 in the United States and Canada. The episode was later included on the Star Trek: The Next Generation season one DVD box set, released in March 2002, and then released as part of the season one Blu-ray set on July 24, 2012.
