= The Last Outpost (Star Trek: The Next Generation) =

- Star Trek: The Next Generation episode
- The design of the Ferengi was created by Andrew Probert, with modifications by Michael Westmore and Mike Okuda.
- Episode no.: Season 1 Episode 5
- Directed by: Richard A. Colla
- Story by: Richard Krzemien
- Teleplay by: Herbert Wright
- Cinematography by: Edward R. Brown
- Production code: 107
- Original air date: October 19, 1987

Guest appearances
- Armin Shimerman – Letek; Jake Dengel – Mordoc; Tracey Walter – Kayron; Darryl Henriques – Portal; Mike Gomez – DaiMon Tarr

Episode chronology
← Previous "Code of Honor"	Next → "Where No One Has Gone Before"
- Star Trek: The Next Generation season 1

"The Last Outpost" is the fifth episode of the American science fiction television series Star Trek: The Next Generation, originally aired within the United States on October 19, 1987. The episode was written by Herbert Wright, based on a story by Richard Krzemien, and directed by Richard Colla. The guest cast included Armin Shimerman, Jake Dengel and Tracey Walter. Although this was Shimerman's first appearance as a Ferengi, he had previously filmed his first appearance in an uncredited role in "Haven", but that was broadcast after "The Last Outpost". He would later gain the role of the Ferengi Quark in the main cast of Star Trek: Deep Space Nine.

Set in the 24th century, the series follows the adventures of the Starfleet crew of the Federation starship Enterprise-D. In this episode, the Enterprise pursue a Ferengi starship to the planet Gamma Tauri IV, where both ships are disabled by an unknown power drain. Away teams from each vessel beam down to the planet where they find an automated system left behind by the Tkon Empire.

This episode marked the first on-screen appearance of the Ferengi, who had been mentioned earlier in the series. They were intended to replace the antagonist roles that Klingons and Romulans played in Star Trek: The Original Series in the new series, but this idea was dropped after their first couple of appearances. Their look was created by Andrew Probert with modifications by Michael Westmore. The tattoo design was created by Mike Okuda, while Probert was also responsible for the design of their starship.

== Plot ==
The Enterprise is in pursuit of a Ferengi vessel which has stolen an energy converter from an unmanned Federation outpost. While the Ferengi were known to the Federation, this is the first contact with the species, and the Ferengi are thought to be at a similar technology level as themselves. As the chase passes the planet Delphi Ardu IV, both ships suffer power drains causing them to come to a halt. Each crew initially believe the power drain is caused by the other vessel, but Captain Jean-Luc Picard (Patrick Stewart) realizes that the Ferengi are as confused as they are, and orders the crew to investigate the planet. Operations Officer Lt. Cdr. Data (Brent Spiner) reports that the planet seems to have once been a remote outpost of the "Tkon Empire" that became extinct 600,000 years ago (during the Middle Pleistocene). Picard contacts the Ferengi and gets them to agree to mutually explore the planet below to try to find the source of the energy drain.

On the planet, the away team is momentarily separated due to effects of the energy field on the transporters. They regroup but are attacked and bound by the Ferengi, who believe the Enterprise crew was planning an ambush of their own. The away team break free, and begin to exchange weapon fire, but the energy expelled is absorbed by a nearby crystalline structure. Data investigates the tree and awakens an entity that displays itself as a humanoid and calls itself Portal 63 (Darryl Henriques), "a guardian of the Tkon Empire." Portal 63 asks the two groups if they seek to enter the Tkon Empire, and does not comprehend when it is told that the Tkon have long since disappeared.

The Ferengi accuse the Enterprise away team of being a hostile force; Commander William Riker (Jonathan Frakes) admits that they are hostile to the Ferengi, inadvertently confirming humanity to be indeed hostile in the eyes of Portal 63, who steps forward, apparently ready to attack Riker, and claims his species is barbaric. Riker responds, "Fear is the true enemy, the only enemy," while not flinching as the attack comes. Portal 63 accepts this and stands down from the challenge, satisfied that the Federation is civilized, and allows the Enterprise to go free. It further offers Riker the opportunity to destroy the Ferengi vessel, but he declines on the grounds that the Ferengi would learn nothing from such an action. Both away teams return to their ships with power restored, and the Ferengi return the stolen energy converter. As a means of ironic thanks, Riker suggests sending the Ferengi a box of Chinese finger traps, a toy that fascinated Data when he became stuck in one earlier in the mission.

== Production ==
=== Creating the Ferengi ===
The creator of Star Trek, Gene Roddenberry, decided early on that he did not want to repeat the adversaries from Star Trek: The Original Series in The Next Generation. To this extent, the "bible" produced before the start of the show stated categorically "No stories about warfare with Klingons or Romulans". The Ferengi were designed by Roddenberry and Herbert Wright to fill this gap. They were mentioned in the episodes running up to "The Last Outpost", which marked their first appearance on screen. After they re-appeared later in the first season in "The Battle", the producers thought that they didn't make a suitable adversary and plans for their continued use in this role were dropped. Their role as major villains in The Next Generation was eventually taken by the Borg. By the time that they appeared in Deep Space Nine, they were used in a comedic fashion. The look of the Ferengi and their ship was created by Andrew Probert. The vessel was inspired by a Horseshoe crab and was built by Greg Jein.

Michael Westmore was responsible for taking Probert's designs for the Ferengi and creating the make-up for the actors to meet that design. In Probert's original concept, the Ferengi had ears which were pointed like a bat. There were concerns from the producers that these would appear simply to be larger versions of the already known Vulcan ears, and so Westmore was told to round off the ears when it came to producing the make-up. Other elements which were changed at the make-up stage included modifications to the nose to increase the volume of wrinkles and dropping the idea of an extended chin as Westmore thought it would save time in applying the make-up. A set of false upper teeth were also created, which were added to a single head piece and a nose piece which comprised the prosthetics for the Ferengi. Westmore was not pleased when a shot of an actor in costume was leaked without the teeth, he said "I was annoyed about that photo because the make-up was incomplete. After all the work that went into it, we would have wanted our design in proper form. The photo was like a pirated version of our make-up, because none of us would ever approved it under those circumstances." Michael Okuda designed a rank designation tattoo which Westmore applied to the right part of each Ferengi forehead. The symbol means "Dog eat dog" and was painted green as that is the color of American dollar bills. Each bar (referred to by the production crew as a "rocker") to the side of the symbol designated a rank, with more bars meaning a higher rank.

=== Writing and casting ===
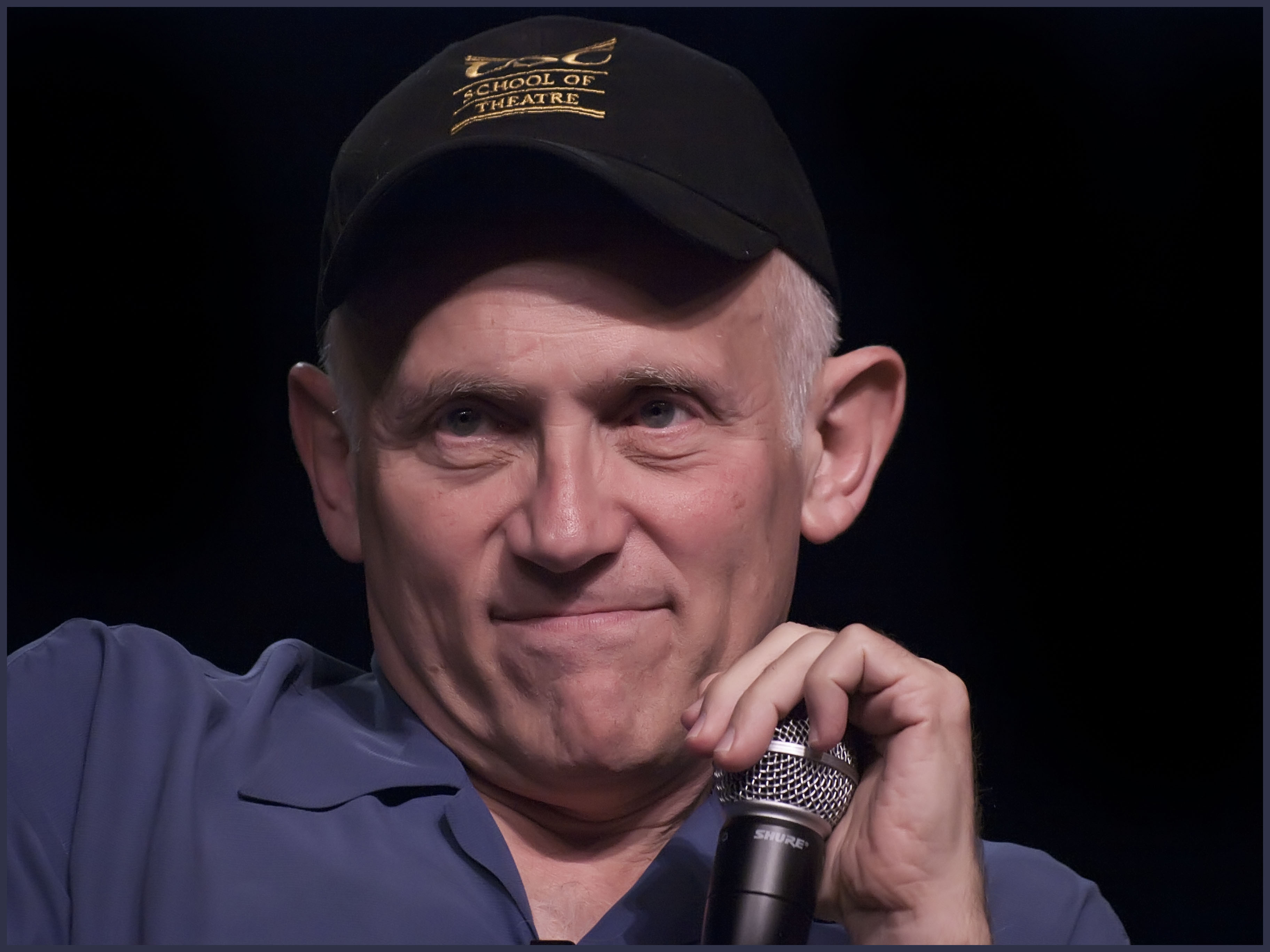
"The Last Outpost" marked the first appearance of Armin Shimerman as a Ferengi character; he would later be cast in the role of Quark in Deep Space Nine

In Richard Krzemien's original draft, Portal was referred to as Dilo. Executive producer Maurice Hurley saw Portal as being a sort of guard-dog, but thought that the Ferengi turned the concept into "silliness". Director Richard Colla felt that the episode had problems which were only identified after shooting was completed. Riker's notion of sending Chinese finger traps to the Ferengi vessel at the end of the episode was a reference to The Original Series episode "The Trouble with Tribbles" where Chief Engineer Scott beams over a shipload of tribbles to a Klingon ship. Wil Wheaton later recalled that the cast was unhappy with the episode as they didn't like several aspects of it including the fingercuffs joke and the Ferengi in general. The episode also featured the first occasion that Geordi La Forge gave a report to the bridge from the engineering section. The producers liked this image so much that from season two onward the character became the Chief Engineer.

The guest stars in this episode re-appeared in different roles later in the series. Both Tracey Walter and Mike Gomez re-appeared as other Ferengi in the sixth season episode "Rascals". This was the second recorded performance of Armin Shimerman in a TNG episode, although the first to be broadcast. He has gone uncredited in a previously filmed role as the face of a Betazoid gift box in "Haven". He made a further appearance as a different Ferengi in "Peak Performance" before gaining the main cast role of the Ferengi Quark in Star Trek: Deep Space Nine. In that role he would also shoot a scene for the movie Star Trek: Insurrection, but it was cut from the final version of the film. He said of his performance in "The Last Outpost", "I was pretty much playing over-the-top villain – that turned out to be very comical. I thought I was being serious, but obviously, it was not serious. It's because there was no subtlety to the performance, there was no attempt to try to give them some real cojones ... It was bad acting. It was just bad acting. They liked it, god bless them, Star Trek liked it."

== Reception ==
"The Last Outpost" aired in broadcast syndication during the week commencing October 17, 1987. It received Nielsen ratings of 8.9, reflecting the percentage of all households watching the episode during its timeslot. This was the lowest ratings received by any episode during the first season.

There was initial criticism regarding the Ferengi from reviewers. Several reviewers re-watched the episode after the end of the series. Keith DeCandido reviewed the episode for Tor.com in May 2011, and praised Mike Gomez as the first Ferengi seen in Star Trek, but thought that they were "far too comical to be taken in any way seriously as the threat the script desperately wanted them to be". He said that apart from the first appearance of the Ferengi and Armin Shimerman that the episode wasn't "anything to write home about". He gave it a score of three out of ten. Cast member Wil Wheaton watched the episode for AOL TV in October 2006. He thought that the episode saw some character growth but felt that the Ferengi "were a total joke" until they were later partially redeemed by Shimerman as Quark in Deep Space Nine. He thought that the episode didn't show a great deal of improvement after "The Naked Now" and "Code of Honor" and may have resulted in the show losing viewers. He gave it a grade of C.

Mark A. Altman reviewed the episode for the 1998 book Trek Navigator stating it was "one big, inferior rip-off of "Arena"." James Hunt wrote about the episode in October 2012 for the website Den of Geek. He thought it worked "surprisingly well" and that the ending was "Star Trek at its best - big idea philosophical nonsense". He praised the plot twists and said that the Ferengi "while completely ridiculous, are genuinely hilarious". Zack Handlen watched the episode for The A.V. Club in April 2010. He described the Ferengi as "really, really terrible", and said that Portal was a lazy device reminiscent of such god-like beings in The Original Series. He gave the episode a grade of C−.

In 2017, Screen Rant ranked this episode the 13th worst episode of the Star Trek franchise. In 2020, GameSpot noted this episode was one of the most bizarre episodes of the series.

== Home media release ==
The first home media release of "The Last Outpost" was on VHS cassette was on April 1, 1992, in the United States and Canada. Episodes from "Encounter at Farpoint" to "Datalore" were released in Japan on LaserDisc on June 10, 1995, as part of First Season Part.1. This included the first season episode "The Last Outpost", and the set has a total runtime of 638 minutes across multiple 12-inch optical video discs. The episode was later included on the Star Trek: The Next Generation season one DVD box set, released in March 2002, and was released as part of the season one Blu-ray set on July 24, 2012.

== See also ==
- "Acquisition" (Star Trek: Enterprise)
