= Nicole Henderson =

Nicole Henderson may refer to:

- Nicole Henderson, character in The Great Mom Swap
- Nicole Henderson, character in Almost Summer
