= Hang Time (TV series) =

- Created by: Troy Searer; Robert Tarlow; Mark Fink
- Starring: Reggie Theus; Dick Butkus; (for remainder of cast, see below)
- Music by: Alan Ett (1995); Mark Heyes (1996–2000)
- Opening theme: "Runnin' with this Dream (Hang Time)" (1995); "Me and My Friends at Hang Time" (1996–2000)
- Country of origin: United States
- Original language: English
- No. of seasons: 6
- No. of episodes: 104 (list of episodes)

Production
- Executive producers: Mark Fink (1995); Peter Engel (1996–2000)
- Producers: Roxie Wenk-Evans (1995); Jon Spector (1996); Javier Winnik (1997–2001); Marco Bario (1997–1999)
- Production location: Indianapolis, Indiana
- Camera setup: Multi-camera
- Running time: 30 minutes
- Production companies: NBC Studios; Peter Engel Productions (1996–2000)

Original release
- Network: NBC
- Release: September 9, 1995 – December 16, 2000

Hang Time is an American teen sitcom that aired on NBC from September 9, 1995, to December 16, 2000, as part of the network's Saturday morning program block for teenagers, TNBC. Created by Troy Searer, Robert Tarlow and Mark Fink, the series featured extensive cast changes throughout its six-season run, similar to its TNBC stablemate Saved by the Bell: The New Class. The show's title is taken from a sports term referring to how long a basketball player stays in the air after leaving the ground for a slam dunk. Hang Time won a Prism Award in 1999 for its accurate depictions of drug use in the season four episodes "High Hoops" and "Breaks of the Game".

== Synopsis ==
The series follows the Deering Tornados boys' varsity basketball team at fictional Deering High School in Deering, Indiana. In the pilot episode, Julie Connor (Daniella Deutscher) transfers from Chicago, Illinois and earns a spot as the team's first female player after impressing Coach Bill Fuller (Reggie Theus), a former NBA player. Though initially met with resistance, she wins over her teammates, including star player Chris Atwater (David Hanson), Danny Mellon (Chad Gabriel), who quickly develops a crush on her, the confident Michael Maxwell (Christian Belnavis), and the country-raised Earl Hatfield (Robert Michael Ryan). Head cheerleader Mary Beth Pepperton (Megan Parlen), initially jealous due to Julie’s closeness with her then-boyfriend Chris, eventually comes around. Team manager Samantha Morgan (Hillary Tuck) begins dating Danny later in the season.

In Season 2, Saved by the Bell executive producer Peter Engel took over as showrunner, bringing major changes to the series. Half the main cast was replaced, with only Daniella Deutscher, Megan Parlen, Chad Gabriel, and Reggie Theus returning. New team members included Josh Sanders (Kevin Bell), a former Little League star coaxed back into sports; Vince D'Amata (Michael Sullivan), a Chicago native and former alternate; and Theodore "Teddy" Brodis (Anthony Anderson), Coach Fuller's godson and son of a former pro player. Paige Peterson joined as Amy Wright, the new head cheerleader, replacing Mary Beth, who was promoted to team manager, where she ultimately excelled. The season also shifted in tone, removing a large amount of the teenage romance seen in the first season and blending topical teen issues like drug use, underage drinking, and sexual harassment with comedic storylines typical of other TNBC shows.

The remainder of the series saw multiple cast changes, most notably the Season 4 addition of former NFL player Dick Butkus as Coach Mike Katowinski, the Tornados' new head coach. Although Hang Time ran for six seasons, with earlier episodes implying Mary Beth and Julie were near college age, only Daniella Deutscher and Megan Parlen remained with the show for its entire run.

Season 3 introduced Adam Frost as star player Michael Manning, who became Julie’s on-again/off-again boyfriend, and Amber Barretto as Kristy Ford, the new head cheerleader after Amy's unexplained exit. Kristy later became entangled in Mary Beth’s comedic mishaps and was eventually promoted to team manager. Frost and Barretto were the only new cast members to stay through the later seasons alongside Deutscher and Parlen.

== Cast ==
Actor	Character	Seasons					
Actor	Character	1	2	3	4	5	6
Daniella Deutscher	Julie Connor	Main	Main	Main	Main	Main	Main
Megan Parlen	Mary Beth Pepperton	Main	Main	Main	Main	Main	Main
Chad Gabriel	Danny Mellon	Main	Main	Main			
Reggie Theus	Coach Bill Fuller	Main	Main	Main			
David Hanson	Chris Atwater	Main					
Hillary Tuck	Samantha Morgan	Main					
Christian Belnavis	Michael Maxwell	Main					
Robert Michael Ryan	Earl Hatfield	Main					
Kevin Bell	Josh Sanders		Main				
Michael Sullivan	Vince D'Amata		Main	Main			
Anthony Anderson	Theodore "Teddy" Brodis, Jr.		Main	Main			
Paige Peterson	Cindy Amy Wright		Main				
Adam Frost	Michael Manning			Main	Main	Main	Main
Amber Barretto	Kristy Ford			Main	Main	Main	Main
Mark Famiglietti	Nick Hammer				Main	Guest	Guest
Dick Butkus	Coach Mike Katowinski				Main	Main	Main
Danso Gordon	Kenny 'Silk' Hayes				Main	Main	Main
James Villani	Rico Bosco				Main		
Jay Hernandez	Antonio Lopez				Recurring	Main	Main
Phillip Glasser	Eugene Brown					Main	Main

== Episodes ==
Season	Episodes	Originally released	
Season	Episodes	First released	Last released
1	13	September 9, 1995	December 2, 1995
2	13	September 7, 1996	November 30, 1996
3	26	September 13, 1997	December 6, 1997
4	26	September 12, 1998	December 5, 1998
5	14	September 11, 1999	March 11, 2000
6	12	September 23, 2000	December 16, 2000

== International broadcasts ==
Country	Network
Australia	Seven Network
Canada	Global
Chile	Channel 13 (Chile)
Czech Republic	TV Nova
Estonia	Kanal 2
Ireland	RTÉ2
Italy	Italia 1
Guatemala	Trecevision
Malaysia	TV2
New Zealand	Channel 4
Philippines	Studio 23
Poland	TVN, ZigZap
Republic of Ireland	Network 2
South Korea	SBS
United Kingdom	Channel 4 (first-run); Trouble (reruns)
Turkey	TRT 1
