= Mary Kate Schellhardt =

American actress (born 1978)

- Born: November 1, 1978 (age 47); Chicago, Illinois, U.S.
- Occupation: Actress
- Years active: 1993–present

Mary Kate Schellhardt (born November 1, 1978) is an American actress. She is known for her roles as Ellen in What's Eating Gilbert Grape (1993), and as Barbara Lovell in Ron Howard's Apollo 13 (1995).

== Filmography ==
=== Film ===
Year	Title	Role	Notes
1993	What's Eating Gilbert Grape	Ellen Grape	
1995	Apollo 13	Barbara Lovell	
1995	Free Willy 2: The Adventure Home	Nadine	
1999	Out of Courage 2: Out for Vengeance	Gretchen Wilson	Short
2007	Mr. Blue Sky	Bonnie Tailor	
2008	Jack Rio	Jamie McNeil / Jill Madison	
2009	Not Twilight	Bella	Video short
2010	Infection: The Invasion Begins	Reporter	
2016	Saturday Scout Club	MK	

=== Television ===
Year	Title	Role	Notes
1994	The Untouchables	Sally	"Legacy"
1995	The Great Mom Swap	Terry Venessi	TV film
2000	Chicken Soup for the Soul	Katelin	1 episode
2006	Scrubs	Carol	"My Extra Mile"
2006	Windfall	Julia	"Urgent Care", "Priceless"
2007	House	Female Fellow	"97 Seconds"
2008	Small Town News	Reggie Blaylock	TV film
2009	Private Practice	Laurie	"Acceptance"
2012	Ben and Kate	Woman #2	"The Trip"
2016	New Girl	Betsy	"Landing Gear"
