= Rascals (Star Trek: The Next Generation) =

- Star Trek: The Next Generation episode
- Episode no.: Season 6 Episode 7
- Directed by: Adam Nimoy
- Story by: Ward Botsford; Diana Dru Botsford; Michael Piller
- Teleplay by: Alison Hock
- Production code: 233
- Original air date: November 2, 1992

Guest appearances
- Colm Meaney – Miles O'Brien; Rosalind Chao – Keiko O'Brien; Michelle Forbes – Ro Laren; David Tristan Birkin – Jean-Luc Picard (age 12); Megan Parlen – Ro Laren (age 12); Caroline Junko King – Keiko O'Brien (age 12); Isis Carmen Jones – Guinan (age 12); Mike Gomez – Lurin; Tracey Walter – Berik; Michael Snyder – Morta; Brian Bonsall – Alexander Rozhenko; Whoopi Goldberg – Guinan; Morgan Nagler – Kid #1; Hana Hatae – Molly O'Brien; Majel Barrett Roddenberry – Computer voice

Episode chronology
← Previous "True Q"	Next → "A Fistful of Datas"
- Star Trek: The Next Generation season 6

"Rascals" is the seventh episode of the sixth season of the American science fiction television series Star Trek: The Next Generation, the 133rd overall. It was originally released on October 30, 1992, in broadcast syndication. "Rascals" was credited to Alison Hock from a story by Ward Botsford, Diana Dru Botsford, and Michael Piller, although the script was revised by several writers with Ronald D. Moore conducting the final draft. It marked the directorial debut of Adam Nimoy.

Set in the 24th century, the series follows the adventures of the Starfleet crew of the Federation starship ‘’Enterprise’’-D. In this episode, the bodies of Captain Jean-Luc Picard (Patrick Stewart) and three other crewmembers are reduced to those of 12-year-old children in a transporter accident. When a group of Ferengi pirates boards the Enterprise, the "children" must work with Commander William Riker (Jonathan Frakes) to take back the ship while coming to terms with their newly found youth.

"Rascals" was not a popular episode with the staff, with scientific advisor Naren Shankar deriding the science proposed for the script. Several of the guest cast had appeared in other roles within the series before: David Tristan Birkin, Mike Gomez, Tracey Walter and Michael Snyder. The episode also marked the final appearance on The Next Generation of Rosalind Chao as Keiko O'Brien, and the series’s only appearance of Hana Hatae as Molly O'Brien, as the characters were to be transferred, along with Colm Meaney’s Miles O'Brien, to the spinoff series Star Trek: Deep Space Nine. The episode received a Nielsen Rating of 13.5 percent, and received a mixed response from critics. Birkin's performance as Picard and the scene with Keiko and Miles O'Brien were praised, while the Ferengi were seen in both positive and negative lights.

== Plot ==
Captain Jean-Luc Picard, Guinan (Whoopi Goldberg), Ensign Ro Laren (Michelle Forbes) and Keiko O'Brien (Rosalind Chao) are returning to the Enterprise from the planet Marlonia, but a transporter accident results in them changing into 12-year-old children. Although the four still retain an adult mind, the crew have trouble taking them seriously, and Picard (David Tristan Birkin) is convinced by Dr. Beverly Crusher (Gates McFadden) to temporarily relinquish command of the ship. After turning over command of the Enterprise to Commander William Riker, Picard ponders resigning his Starfleet commission, albeit temporarily, in order to pursue other interests. Meanwhile, Keiko (Caroline Junko King) is dismayed by her husband Miles's (Colm Meaney) reluctance to be with her and is further saddened her daughter (Hana Hatae) does not recognize her. While Ro (Megan Parlen) is at first upset after being reminded of her unpleasant childhood, once Guinan's (Isis Carmen Jones) enthusiasm causes her to soften, the duo begin jumping on a bed and engaging in other childish pursuits.

Dr. Crusher works out how to reverse the de-aging under controlled conditions. Before further tests can be run, two Klingon warships decloak and attack the Enterprise. Ferengi pirates board the ship and take control, but Riker locks out the main computer. The Ferengi beam most of the adults on board to a nearby planet and corral the children, including Picard and his party, into the schoolrooms on board. Picard and his group try to use the classroom computers to regain control of the ship, but are prevented by the limited functionality and condescending interface. Picard pretends to be Riker's son and demands the Ferengi take him to his "father," throwing a tantrum until his demand is met. He asks Riker to unlock the computer console in the schoolroom, using the ruse that none of the computer games will work.

After Picard is returned to the schoolroom, the lead Ferengi threatens to harm the children if Riker does not unlock the computer and teach his lieutenant how to operate the Enterprise. Riker pretends to instruct the Ferengi officer, but only spouts deliberately meaningless technobabble as he unlocks the computer console in Picard's schoolroom. With command functions enabled, Picard is able to activate a transporter safety function. With help from Worf's son, Alexander Rozhenko (Brian Bonsall), Guinan, and Ro, they use communication badges to trap most of the Ferengi on a transporter pad with their weapons disarmed and the exit blocked by a force field. Once most of them are detained, the children and Riker are able to overpower the remaining members and retake the Enterprise. After the events, the transporter is used to return Picard, Guinan and Keiko to their adult states. Buoyed by her experience, Ro decides to remain a child for just a little longer to draw some pictures, something she never did during her childhood.

== Production ==
=== Writing ===
The basic idea behind "Rascals" was pitched by Ward Botsford and Diana Dru Botsford to producers Jeri Taylor and Michael Piller during the fourth season. Taylor later recalled that they were the only members of the staff that liked the idea. Although Alison Hock received the credit for the teleplay, it went through several revisions with Ronald D. Moore conducting the final re-write. He later explained that he did not like the story and felt that he had not "dodged the bullet fast enough" but instead attempted to put his feelings aside. Part of the changes he made to the script was to add several "character moments", and to consult with the show's scientific adviser Naren Shankar about the type of scenario which could turn the main characters into children. Shankar did not enjoy the work on "Rascals" either, calling it "Not a happy day" when the discussions began.

Shankar did not support the idea in the initial script that there was some sort of homonuclear molecule within DNA at the child stage of development that could be reverted to. He described the concept as "silly", and insisted that it was not used. He later explained that the "problem was that it was virtually impossible to come up with a sensible explanation and so we kind of did a lot of hand waving on this episode". The use of the term RVN was only created after executive producer Rick Berman requested something similar to DNA. Regarding the method in which the characters were restored to adulthood, he said "Let's not even talk about it. Let's just forget that ever happened." Taylor later said that Moore's changes made "it work".

There was also some disagreement among the staff as to who the enemy should be in "Rascals". Piller was the one who suggested the Ferengi due to the aliens' previously portrayed comedic nature. He had dismissed using either the Cardassians or the Romulans as he felt they were too lethal to be pitted against children. Taylor was not convinced by the idea of using the Ferengi, calling it "a big one to swallow" as it suggested that five of them could take over the Enterprise by themselves. She said that Piller was "probably right" in his decision.

=== Direction and casting ===
"Rascals" was the directorial debut of Adam Nimoy, the son of Star Trek: The Original Series actor Leonard Nimoy, who played Spock. He had previously trained as an attorney but decided to pursue a job in entertainment instead. He assisted director Nicholas Meyer on the film Star Trek VI: The Undiscovered Country (1991) and then observed directors on The Next Generation during the series' fifth season. His work on "Rascals" was praised by executive producer Rick Berman, saying that Francis Ford Coppola would have found the job of managing four child actors a challenge. Later in the season, Nimoy returned to direct "Timescape".

Nimoy called Megan Parlen "phenomenal" in her role as the young Ro, and compared her to Christina Ricci. Taylor also praised Parlen, calling her "fantastic" in the role. Because of the expectation that Forbes would not return to the role of Ro after "Rascals", Taylor suggested at one point keeping the character as a child since her return to adulthood was not seen on screen. She suggested it to Piller and Berman, but said that they looked as if what she said was "absolutely insane". Taylor said it remained a good idea, as she felt that only Star Trek could have a character changed into the body of the child and yet still fly the ship. "Rascals" marked the only appearance by Forbes during the sixth season, but she later returned for the penultimate episode of the series, "Preemptive Strike".

Each of the Ferengi actors had previously played members of the alien race on the series before. Mike Gomez and Tracey Walter, who played Lurin and Berik respectively in "Rascals", had appeared in "The Last Outpost", while Morta actor Michael Snyder had appeared in "The Perfect Mate". "Rascals" also marked the final appearance of Meaney and Chao as the O'Briens, before they moved over to Star Trek: Deep Space Nine. Meaney later returned for the final episode of The Next Generation, "All Good Things...", in a sequence set prior to the pilot. "Rascals" also saw the only appearance of Hatae in The Next Generation, although she would recur throughout Deep Space Nine in that role.

Nimoy was concerned about the voices of the child actors compared to those of the adults, describing the casting of the Picard role as "tough". Birkin was cast in that role; he had previously played Picard's nephew Rene in The Next Generation episode "Family". Isis Carmen Jones portrayed the younger version of Guinan. This character had only been added to the script after Goldberg agreed to appear in the episode at Nimoy's request.

== Reception ==
=== Broadcast ===
"Rascals" was originally released in broadcast syndication on October 30, 1992. It received Nielsen ratings of 13.5 percent, placing it in second place in its timeslot. This was part of an overall decline in ratings during the first part of the sixth season; the preceding episode, "True Q", received ratings of 13.7 percent. The episode broadcast after "Rascals", "A Fistful of Datas", received a rating of 13.4 percent.

=== Critical reception ===
In their book The Unauthorized Trek: The Complete Next Generation (1995), James Van Hise and Hal Schuster said that the episode was not as funny as it thought it was, and that the success of the Picard and the other children resulted in the adult crewmembers looking "ineffectual". Mark Jones and Lance Parkin, in their book Beyond the Final Frontier: An Unauthorised Review of Star Trek (2003), praised the child actors seen in "Rascals", in particular the work of Birkin. They also added that the scene between Miles and Keiko was a highlight of the episode, due to the awkwardness portrayed.

Zack Handlen gave the episode a rating of "B−" in his review for The A.V. Club. He praised Birkin, but criticised Jones, saying that she "deliver[ed] every line as though looking to earn high marks in Enunciation and Condescension 101". Handlen said that the Miles/Keiko scene was "dramatically interesting", and that the part of the episode with the Ferengi was "a nice mini-action movie that helps pick up a generally dodgy hour". However, he considered it to be padding as it felt disconnected from the part of the episode that came before it.

Keith DeCandido reviewed the episode for Tor.com, giving it a rating of two out of ten. He said that it resembled the Star Trek: The Animated Series episode "The Counter-Clock Incident", and that the first act of "Rascals" was compelling. However, he said: "It’s difficult to put into words how appallingly stupid the entire episode becomes from the moment the Birds of Prey decloak to the end." He criticized the ability of the Ferengi to take over the Enterprise, calling them "spectacularly idiotic" with Picard's plan requiring them to be "dumber than a box of hammers". He said that the only reason why the episode was given a score as high as two was because of the effectiveness of the scene with Miles and Keiko.

== Home media release ==
"Rascals" was released in the United States on a two-episode VHS tape in 1995, alongside "True Q". The episode was released as part of the Star Trek: The Next Generation season six DVD box set in the United States on December 3, 2002. The most recent release was on Blu-ray disc June 24, 2014.
