= Julian Christopher =

American actor (1944–2023)

- Born: November 7, 1944; Philadelphia, Pennsylvania, U.S.
- Died: February 26, 2023 (aged 78)
- Other names: Julian D Christopher; James Louis Watkins; James Watkins; Jim Watkins
- Occupation: Actor
- Years active: 1972–2023

Julian Christopher (November 7, 1944 – February 26, 2023) was an American actor. He is best known for his roles in various films and television series from the 1970s to the present, including The Magician and the episode "Code of Honor" from Star Trek: The Next Generation. His most notable appearances, besides his Star Trek: The Next Generation role, were in the films Cool Breeze, X-Men: The Last Stand, Elysium and 88 Minutes.

In 1974, he appeared in a series of Burger King commercials aimed at the US African American market.

Christopher died on February 26, 2023, at the age of 78.

== Filmography ==
Year	Title	Role	Notes
1972	Cool Breeze	Travis Battle	Credited as Jim Watkins
1972	Black Gunn	Lt. Hopper	Credited as Jim Watkins
1974	McQ	J.C.	Credited as Jim Watkins
1974	Caged Heat	Sharpshooter	Uncredited
1976	J. D.'s Revenge	Carl	Credited as James Louis Watkins
1987	The Night Stalker	Julius	Credited as James Watkins
1987	Amen	Larry Williams	TV Series; Credited as James Louis Watkins
1987	Star Trek: The Next Generation	Hagon	Season 1, Episode 4: "Code of Honor"; Credited as James Louis Watkins
1988	Spellbinder	Tim Weatherly	Credited as James Louis Watkins
1991	Timebomb	Black Leader	
2002	Smallville	Dr. MacIntyre	Season 1, Episode 12: "Leech"
2005	The Lazarus Child	Elliot Chase	
2005	The Exorcism of Emily Rose	District Attorney	
2005	Severed: Forest of the Dead	Mac	
2006	X-Men: The Last Stand	Prison Truck Guard #1	Credited as Julian D. Christopher
2006	The Hard Corps	Clarence Bowden	direct-to-DVD
2007	88 Minutes	Mactire	Credited as Julian D. Christopher
2007	Whisper	Mr. Harper	
2007	Beneath	Dr. Cestia	Credited as Julian D. Christopher
2010	Lullaby for Pi	Richard	
2010	Freshman Father	Teacher Cowell	TV movie
2013	Elysium	Armadyne Investor	
2017	Crash Pad	Billy Ocean	
2020	Upload	Ernie	
