= Andrew Kavovit =

American actor

- Born: Andrew Michael Kavovit; July 19, 1971 (age 55); The Bronx, New York City, U.S.
- Occupation: Actor
- Years active: 1986–2007
- Children: 1

Andrew Michael Kavovit (born July 19, 1971) is an American actor, best known for portraying Paul Ryan on the CBS soap opera As the World Turns. Kavovit originated the role as a teenager in 1986 and won the Daytime Emmy Award for Outstanding Younger Actor in a Drama Series in 1990. He later starred as John "J.D." Dunne in the CBS western series The Magnificent Seven.

== Early life ==
Kavovit was born in The Bronx, New York City, and grew up in Yorktown Heights, New York. He began pursuing acting work at approximately age 12. He graduated from Yorktown High School in 1989.

== Career ==
=== As the World Turns ===
Kavovit began his professional television career as a teenager when he was cast as Paul Stenbeck, later known as Paul Ryan, on the CBS daytime drama As the World Turns in 1986. He remained with the series for approximately six years during his initial run. His portrayal of Paul received multiple Daytime Emmy nominations. In 1990, Kavovit won the award then presented for outstanding juvenile or younger actor in a drama series, defeating fellow nominee Bryan Buffington of Guiding Light. The Los Angeles Times listed Kavovit among the major acting winners at the 17th Daytime Emmy Awards, where As the World Turns competed alongside the other major network daytime dramas. Kavovit was again nominated for the Outstanding Younger Actor award in 1991. He later returned to As the World Turns for additional appearances in 1992 and from 2000 to 2001.

=== Prime-time television and film ===
Following his initial departure from As the World Turns, Kavovit worked extensively as a guest actor in prime-time television. His appearances during the 1990s included Full House, Silk Stalkings, Lifestories: Families in Crisis, Married... with Children, The Great Mom Swap, The Burning Zone, and Star Trek: Deep Space Nine.

In 1998, Kavovit was cast as John "J.D." Dunne, a former gunslinger turned lawman, in the CBS western television series The Magnificent Seven. The series was based on the 1960 film of the same name and followed seven men protecting a town in the American West. Kavovit appeared as a series regular alongside Michael Biehn, Eric Close, Dale Midkiff, Ron Perlman, Rick Worthy and Anthony Starke. CBS initially canceled The Magnificent Seven after its first season before reversing the decision and bringing the series back as a midseason replacement. Kavovit ultimately appeared in 22 episodes between 1998 and 2000. During a 1999 interview with co-star Dale Midkiff, Kavovit discussed the ensemble nature of the production and his casting in the series.

Kavovit also appeared in television films including The David Cassidy Story and The Trial of Old Drum. His film work included a supporting role as Richie in the 2001 comedy Rat Race, directed by Jerry Zucker. He continued making television appearances during the 2000s, including roles in Joan of Arcadia, Miracles and Criminal Minds.

== Personal life ==
Kavovit has a daughter, Kiowa Kavovit. In 2014, he appeared with her on an episode of the ABC reality series Shark Tank featuring young entrepreneurs. Kiowa presented Boo Boo Goo, a paint-on bandage product she had developed.

== Filmography ==
Film and Television appearances
Year	Title	Role	Notes
1986–1991, 1992, 2000-2001	As the World Turns	Paul Ryan	Daytime Emmy Award for Outstanding Younger Actor in a Drama Series (1990)
1993	Full House	Paul	Episode: Prom Night
1994	Silk Stalkings	Newman	Episode: Head 'N' Tail
1994	Lifestories: Families in Crisis	Brandon Clifton	Episode: Confronting Brandon: The Intervention of an Addict
1994	My So-Called Life	Nicky Driscoll	Episode: Halloween
1994	Married... with Children	Mark Campbell	Episode: Radio Free Trumaine
1995	The Great Mom Swap	David Ridgeway	TV movie
1995	Trial By Fire	Kip Bouchmoyer	TV movie
1995	Courthouse	Jason	Episode: Fair-Weathered Friends
1995–1996	Weird Science	Lyle	2 episodes: Grumpy Old Genie / Teen Lisa
1996	Seduced by Madness: The Diane Borchardt Story	Jeb	TV mini-series
1996	Andersonville	Tobias	TV movie
1996	Terror in the Family	Garret Lexau	TV movie
1996	Star Trek: Deep Space Nine	Kirby	Episode: ...Nor the Battle to the Strong
1996	NYPD Blue	Rick	Episode: Yes Sir, That's My Baby
1997	The Burning Zone	Dr. Joey Wetherall	Episode: The Last Endless Summer
1998–2000	The Magnificent Seven	John "J.D." Dunne	Series Regular - 22 episodes
1999	Touched by an Angel	Eddie Rourke	Episode: The Compass
2000	The David Cassidy Story	David Cassidy	TV movie
2001	Rat Race	Richie	Film
2003	Rent Control	Dennis	TV movie
2003	Joan of Arcadia	Officer Koczara	Episode: Death Be Not Whatever
2003	Miracles	Henry Tucker	Episode: The Battle at Shadow Ridge
2007	Criminal Minds	Max Poole	Episode: About Face

== Awards and nominations ==
Year	Award	Category	Work	Result
1988	Daytime Emmy Awards	Outstanding Younger Leading Man in a Drama Series	As the World Turns	Nominated
1989	Daytime Emmy Awards	Outstanding Juvenile Actor in a Drama Series	As the World Turns	Nominated
1990	Daytime Emmy Awards	Outstanding Juvenile Actor in a Drama Series	As the World Turns	Won
1991	Daytime Emmy Awards	Outstanding Younger Actor in a Drama Series	As the World Turns	Nominated
