= Special Forces (2003 film) =

- Directed by: Isaac Florentine
- Written by: David N. White
- Produced by: Boaz Davidson
- Starring: Marshall R. Teague; Tim Abell; Danny Lee Clark
- Cinematography: Gideon Porath
- Edited by: Irit Raz
- Music by: Stephen Edwards
- Release date: June 2003
- Running time: 96 min.
- Country: United States
- Language: English
- Budget: US$ 1,300,000 (est)

Special Forces is a 2003 American war film directed by Isaac Florentine and written by David N. White. The film stars Marshall R. Teague, Tim Abell and Danny Lee Clark.

== Plot ==
In the aftermath of the war in Bosnia, former Bosnian Army General Hasib Rafendek (Eli Danker), who is convicted of war crimes has taken command of the military of the former Soviet republic of Muldonia.

In a Hezbollah terrorist camp, a U.S. Army private is being held hostage. His interrogator decides to terrorise him with a revolver. Meanwhile, an elite Special Forces team infiltrates the camp to rescue him. Eventually, they're spotted, and are forced to open fire on the terrorists. The team rescues the private and flee in a boat back to friendly territory, which is followed by another mission of rescuing an American journalist. The film mainly focuses upon the impossible rescue mission.

== Cast ==
- Marshall R. Teague as Major Don Harding
- Tim Abell as Jess
- Danny Lee Clark as "Bear"
- Troy Mittleider as Wyatt
- Daniella Deutscher as Wendy Teller
- T.J. Rotolo as Reyes
- Eli Danker as General Hasib Rafendek
- Scott Adkins as Talbot
- Vladislavas Jacukevicius as Zaman
- Michael Saad as President Hrankoff
- Rimantė Valiukaitė as Saira
- Andrius Zebrauskas as Bureaucrat
- Cezaris Grauzinis as Muldan Soldier
- Henrikas Savickas as Vassily Nagayev
- Geoff Parish as Private Regional Command
- Adomas Gotesmonas as Little Boy
- Kestutis Jakstas as British Prisoner
- Dainius Kazlauskas as Terrorist
- Audrius Bruzas as U.S. Soldier #1
