= Terror in the Family =

1996 American made-for-television film by Gregory Goodell

- DVD cover
- Genre: Drama
- Written by: Gregory Goodell
- Directed by: Gregory Goodell
- Starring: Joanna Kerns; Dan Lauria; Hilary Swank; Andrew Kavovit; Adam Hendershott; Nan Martin; Beau Billingslea; Kathleen Wilhoite
- Theme music composer: Ron Ramin
- Country of origin: United States
- Original language: English

Production
- Executive producers: Robert M. Sertner; Ruth Slawson; Frank von Zerneck
- Producers: Ira Marvin; Randy Sutter
- Cinematography: Steve Yaconelli
- Editor: Michael Eliot
- Running time: 86 minutes
- Production companies: Hallmark Entertainment; Ruth Slawson Productions; Von Zerneck Sertner Films

Original release
- Network: Fox Broadcasting Company
- Release: April 16, 1996

Terror in the Family is a 1996 American television film directed by Gregory Goodell and starring Joanna Kerns, Dan Lauria, Andrew Kavovit, Adam Hendershott, Nan Martin, Beau Billingslea, Kathleen Wilhoite, and Hilary Swank. The film is about the parents' struggle of raising their teenage daughter whose rebellious temperament erupts into violence. Filming took place in Utah.

== Plot ==
Deena Marten is a 15-year-old high school student living in Washington state, Her behavior has worsened since she began dating Garret Lexaua, a senior who was suspended from school for assaulting a teacher. Deena frequently skips school and defies her parents, straining a once-close relationship with her mother, Cynthia. Tensions within the family are compounded by Cynthia's drinking and her emotionally distant relationship with her husband, Todd. Deena's brother Adam often tries to keep the peace between the family.

Cynthia also has a troubled relationship with her alcoholic mother, who criticizes her parenting and urges her to discipline Deena more harshly. Tensions between Cynthia and Deena escalate when Deena becomes physically violent with her. Meanwhile, Adam begins drinking to cope with the family’s problems. After Cynthia discovers that Deena has been skipping school, another confrontation ends with Deena striking her mother and bloodying her lip. Deena later apologizes but continues to lie about her activities with Garret and persuades Cynthia to conceal her truancy from Todd.

After learning that Deena has been removed from the swim team, Todd blames Cynthia’s parenting and drinking for their daughter’s behavior and imposes stricter rules on Deena. Despite initially agreeing to them, Deena continues seeing Garret and lying to her parents about her whereabouts. Todd’s attempts to discipline her prove unsuccessful, and during an argument, Deena slams her bedroom door on his hand, breaking his fingers. Believing she cannot remain at home, Deena considers running away, and Garret suggests that they leave for California together.

After Cynthia and Todd discover marijuana and failing schoolwork in Deena’s room, Todd grounds her and forbids her from seeing Garret. Deena continues planning to run away with him and sneaks out despite her parents’ restrictions. When she returns, another confrontation turns violent, with Deena striking Cynthia and threatening Todd with a knife. Adam calls the police, and Deena is arrested despite her parents’ objections. She is subsequently released into the custody of her aunt Judith, placed on probation, ordered to have no contact with her parents, and required to attend therapy.

While staying with Judith, Deena learns that Cynthia and Judith were physically abused by their mother as children, leading Cynthia to avoid physically disciplining her own children. Meanwhile, Cynthia’s drinking worsens as she struggles with her separation from Deena and repeatedly attempts to contact her. Deena refuses her calls, becoming increasingly frustrated by her mother’s emotional dependence on her.

Cynthia resists Deena’s therapy and continues drinking, leading to another confrontation between them. Seeking comfort from Garret, Deena discovers him with another girl. Judith confronts Cynthia about her behavior, comparing her alcoholism to their mother’s, while Cynthia continues to blame Garret for Deena’s problems. Cynthia then discovers that Adam has also been drinking, forcing the family to confront problems extending beyond Deena. Cynthia and Todd argue over their parenting and their respective failures within the family, after which Todd resolves to attend therapy with his children and become more involved as a father.

On her way to therapy, Deena encounters Garret but decides not to miss her session. At the treatment center, she is surprised to find Todd and Adam waiting for her. Todd tells his children that he loves them and wants the family to change. Cynthia arrives shortly afterward, and the family begins therapy together.

At her hearing, Deena avoids jail but is sentenced to a year of probation, community service, and anger management classes. Garret expects her to leave for California with him, but Deena refuses, explaining that Cynthia has entered treatment and that she wants to help her family. Garret reacts angrily and leaves. Deena is then reunited with her parents and Adam.

== Cast ==
- Joanna Kerns as Cynthia Marten
- Dan Lauria as Todd Marten
- Hilary Swank as Deena Marten
- Andrew Kavovit as Garret Lexau
- Adam Hendershott as Adam Marten
- Nan Martin as Ivy
- Beau Billingslea as Judge Roubal
- Kathleen Wilhoite as Judith
