= Esther Scott =

American actress (1953–2020)

- Scott in 2016
- Born: April 13, 1953; Queens, New York, U.S.
- Died: February 14, 2020 (aged 66); Los Angeles, California, U.S.
- Education: San Francisco State University
- Occupations: Actress; voice actress
- Years active: 1985–2016

Esther Scott (April 13, 1953 – February 14, 2020) was an American actress.

== Early years ==
Scott was born in Flushing, Queens, New York, on April 13, 1953. When she was a child the family moved to Brooklyn, New York. She developed an interest in acting while she was a student at Bronx High School of Science. She later moved to California and graduated with a degree in theater arts from San Francisco State University.

== Career ==
Scott began her career as voice actress on Star Wars: Ewoks, before appearing on television shows including Beverly Hills, 90210, Full House, Party of Five, Ellen, The Steve Harvey Show, and Sister, Sister.

Scott was a regular cast member in the short-lived ABC sitcom The Geena Davis Show (2000-2001) playing Geena Davis' housekeeper, Gladys. She also had the recurring roles on City Guys (1998-2001), short-lived The Help (2004) as Doris, and Hart of Dixie (2011-2015) as Delma Warner. In film, she has appeared in Boyz n the Hood (1991), The Kid (2000), You Got Served (2004), Dreamgirls (2006), Gangster Squad (2013), and The Birth of a Nation (2016).

== Death ==
Scott died on February 14, 2020, in Los Angeles, after suffering a heart attack.

== Filmography ==
Film
Year	Title	Role	Notes
1991	Boyz n the Hood	Grandma Rosa	
1992	Encino Man	Mrs. Evelyn Mackey	
1994	Don Juan DeMarco	Nurse Alvira Jane	
1995	The Low Life	Mrs. Jenny Raymond	
1995	Species	Det. Patricia Johnson	
1995	Illegal in Blue	Diane	Direct-to-video
1996	The Craft	Nurse Georgia Fields	
1997	Out to Sea	Maria Sanford	
1997	One Eight Seven	Mrs. Etta Ford	
1998	Senseless	Denise Witherspoon	
1998	October 22	Mrs. Jennings	
2000	The Kid	Clarissa	
2002	Austin Powers in Goldmember	Judge Clara Scott	
2003	Fresh Like Strawberries	Florence	Short
2004	You Got Served	Grandma Smith	
2004	Serial Killing 4 Dummys	Sally Lindon	
2005	Fun with Dick and Jane	Mae	
2006	Dreamgirls	Aunt Ethel	
2006	The Pursuit of Happyness	Maylene Jo	
2007	I'm Through with White Girls	Hester James	
2007	Sister's Keeper	Mama Pines	
2007	Transformers	Grandma Rose Whitman	
2013	Gangster Squad	Letty Mitchell	
2016	Trust Fund	Gloria Scott	
2016	The Birth of a Nation	Bridget Turner	

Television
Year	Title	Role	Notes
1985	Star Wars: Ewoks	Shodu Warrick	Voice, 13 episodes
1991	False Arrest	Dorinda	TV movie
1994	Baby Brokers	Polly O'Neill	TV movie
1994	Full House	Mrs. Patrice Homewood	Episode: "To Joey, with Love"
1994-1997	Melrose Place	Nurse Mary Mae	3 episodes
1995	The Great Mom Swap	Officer Patricia Smith	TV movie
1997-1998	Sister, Sister	Mattie	3 episodes
1997	Ellen	Ruby	Episode: "Alone Again... Naturally"
1997	A Christmas Memory	Anna Stabler	TV movie
1998	The Steve Harvey Show	Auntie Pearl	Episode: "Maid to Order"
1998-2001	City Guys	Rolanda Johnson	4 episodes
2000-2001	The Geena Davis Show	Gladys	22 episodes
2004	The Help	Doris	6 episodes
2004	Monk	Delores	1 episode
2011-2015	Hart of Dixie	Delma Warner	24 episodes
