= Adam Hendershott =

American actor (born 1983)

- Born: June 6, 1983 (age 43); Los Angeles County, California, U.S.
- Other name: Adam Henderschott
- Occupations: Actor, photographer
- Years active: 1990–2012
- Spouse: Sylvia Hendershott (m. 2009)

Adam Hendershott (born June 6, 1983) is a former American actor and photographer.

== Early life ==
Hendershott was born in Los Angeles County, California. He studied acting with Milton Katselas at the Beverly Hills Playhouse.

== Career ==
He has appeared in a number of film and television roles, including What-a-Mess, Sydney White, Jack & Bobby, Veronica Mars and Gilmore Girls.

== Filmography ==
=== Film ===
Year	Title	Role	Notes
1994	Greedy	Joseph "Joe" McTeague	
1996	Celtic Pride	Tommy O'Hara	
1996	Playing Dangerous 2	Billy Spengler	
2006	Swimming	Robert 'Navy Boy' Larrabee	Short
2006	Big Bad Wolf	Nick Baxter	
2007	Sydney White	Jeremy	
2007	X's & O's	Harlen	
2008	Small Town Saturday Night	Les Ryan	
2012	The Mine	Jimmy	
2022	Take One- She	Brian	Short film

=== Television ===
Year	Title	Role	Notes
1990	Doogie Howser, M.D.	Young Doogie	"It Ain't Over Till Mrs. Howser Sings"
1990	Night Court	Dr. Loogie	"Still Another Day in the Life"
1991	Homefront	Vincent	"Kids"
1991	Perfect Strangers	Richie Johnson	"Wild Turkey"
1992	Brooklyn Bridge	Ronnie	"Boys and Girls Together Again"
1992	Roseanne	Todd Bowman	"The Commercial Show"
1992	Calendar Girl, Cop, Killer? The Bambi Bembenek Story	Shannon	TV film
1993	Getting By	Blake	"A Little Romance"
1993	Wings	Tommy	"Another Wedding"
1993	The Trouble with Larry	Brad	"My Science Fair Lady"
1993	The Nanny	Kevin	"The Butler, the Husband, the Wife and Her Mother"
1994	Viper	T.J.	"Safe as Houses"
1994	Children of the Dark	Skip	TV film
1994	Hardball	Nelson	TV film
1994	The Bears Who Saved Christmas	Tom (voice)	TV short
1995	Step by Step	Kirk Weber	"Adventures in Babysitting"
1995	What-a-Mess	Son (voice)	3 episodes
1996	Terror in the Family	Adam Marten	Television film
1996	The Faculty	Billy	"Spirit Day", "Bus Stop", "The Brain Teaser"
1996	Mr. & Mrs. Smith	Bobby	"The Poor Pitiful Put-Upon Singer Episode"
1997	Home Improvement	Kevin	"Family Un-Ties"
2000	Malcolm in the Middle	Adam	"Shame"
2001	Touched by an Angel	Randy Templeton	"The Penalty Box"
2002	Boston Public	Brian Hunt	"Chapter 40"
2002	Judging Amy	Gunnar Barard	"Thursday's Child"
2002	The Jersey	Dwayne	"The Playbook"
2003	Maniac Magee	Big John McNab	TV film
2003	The Division	Charlie	"Extreme Action Figures"
2004	Charmed	Slick	"The Legend of Sleepy Halliwell"
2004	CSI: Crime Scene Investigation	Henry Capana	"Turn of the Screws"
2004	NCIS	Josh	"Split Decision"
2004	Jack & Bobby	Garrett	"Chess Lessons"
2005	Nip/Tuck	Derek Jordan	"Derek, Alex, and Gary"
2005–06	Veronica Mars	Vincent 'Butters' Clemmons	Guest role (season 2)
2006	Gilmore Girls	A.K.	Recurring role (seasons 6–7)
2007	Cold Case	Lucas Gladwell	"Knuckle Up"
2008	Life	Benny Bankley	"Everything... All the Time"
