= Mike Gomez =

American actor (born 1951)

- Born: April 18, 1951 (age 75); Dallas, Texas, U.S.
- Years active: 1979-present
- Known for: The Big Lebowski, Star Trek: The Next Generation

Mike Gomez (born April 18, 1951) is an American actor. Best known for his performances in such cult classics as The Big Lebowski and Star Trek: The Next Generation, Gomez has costarred in numerous films including Heartbreak Ridge and Milagro Beanfield War, Zoot Suit, The Border and El Norte, to name a few. His TV credits include Bones, The Shield, Desperate Housewives, and a series regular role as 'Capt. Gallardo' on the NBC series, Hunter, among others. On stage, Gomez' numerous theater credits include Zoot Suit at the Winter Garden on Broadway and the Pre-Broadway run of Selena.

== Partial filmography ==
- How the West Was Won
  - Episode: "The Slavers" (1979) .... Brother Carlos
- Getting Wasted (1980) .... Hector
- Zoot Suit (1981) .... Joey / Jose Torres
- The Border (1982) .... Manuel
  - also as dialogue coach: Spanish
- El Norte (1983) .... Jaime
- Women of San Quentin (1983, TV Movie) .... Mexican Gang Member
- T.J. Hooker
  - Episode: "Lady in Blue" (1983) .... Dino Morales
  - Episode: "Deadlock" (1984) .... Gomez
- The Yellow Rose .... Sanchez
  - Episode: "Divided We Fall" (1983)
  - Episode: "When Honor Dies" (1983)
  - Episode: "Walls of Fear" (1983)
  - Episode: "Sins of the Father" (1983)
- Hill Street Blues
  - Episode: "Ratman and Bobbin" (1984) .... Pimp
  - Episode: "Nichols from Heaven" (1984) .... Pimp
  - Episode: "Fuchs Me? Fuchs You!" (1984) .... Jose
- Appointment with Fear (1985) .... Little Joe
- The Patriot (1986) .... Kenwood
- Heartbreak Ridge (1986) .... Quinones
- Born in East L.A. (1987) .... Coyote #2 (Extended TV Cut Only (Uncredited))
- Werewolf (1988)
  - Episode: "Nightmare in Blue" .... Officer Lopez
- The Milagro Beanfield War (1988) .... Milagro Townsperson
- 21 Jump Street
  - Episode: "La Bizca" (1990) .... Paco
- By Dawn's Early Light (1990, TV Movie) .... E-4 Co-Pilot
- Star Trek: The Next Generation
  - Episode: "The Last Outpost" (1987) .... DaiMon Tarr
  - Episode: "Rascals" (1992) .... DaiMon Lurin
- The X Files
  - Episode: "Little Green Men" (1994) .... Jorge Concepcion
- Courthouse
  - Episode: "Child Support" (1995) .... Martin Rivera
- Chicago Hope
  - Episode: "White Trash" (1997) .... Det. Dennis Jimenez
- The Big Lebowski (1998) .... Auto Circus Cop (as Michael Gomez)
- Dance with Me (1998) .... Bartender
- Running Woman (1998) .... Lupo
- Walker, Texas Ranger
  - Episode: "Jacob's Ladder" (1999) .... Joe Salizar
- Luminarias (1999) .... Frank Chavez
- Metal (1999) .... Party Goer (as Michael Gomez)
- Short Changed (2000) .... Guadalupe
- Under Suspicion (2000) .... Singer (voice)
- Resurrection Blvd.
  - Episode: "Juntos (Together)" (2001)
- Road Dogz (2002) .... Antonio Carrasco
- Hunter: Return to Justice (2002, TV Movie)
- Hunter: Back in Force (2003, TV Movie) .... Captain Gallardo
- Hunter (2003, TV Series) .... Capt. Roberto Gallardo
- Forgotten Voices (2004, Short) .... Don Sebastian
- Locusts (2005, TV Movie) .... Secretary Morales
- 3some (2005, Short) .... Carlos
- Desperate Housewives
  - Episode: "There's Something About a War" (2006) .... Second Priest
- Bones
  - Episode: "The Woman in the Garden" (2006) .... Hector Alvaredo
- Yes Man (2008) .... Father at Homeless Shelter
- Criminal Minds
  - Episode: "Foundation..." (2012) .... Detective Nate Perez
- Devious Maids
  - Episode: "pilot" (2013) .... Priest
- The Caretaker (2016) .... Gilberto
- The Aliens (2017) .... Sheriff
