= Daniella Deutscher =

American actress

- Born: Daniella Maria Deutscher; October 4, 1975 (age 50); Bozeman, Montana, U.S.
- Other name: Daniella Wolters
- Occupation: Actress
- Years active: 1994–2006
- Spouse: Jay Hernandez (m. 2006)

Daniella Maria Deutscher (born October 4, 1975), also sometimes credited as Daniella Wolters, is an American actress, best known for playing Julie Connor on the NBC American Saturday morning television series Hang Time (1995–2000).

== Early life ==
Deutscher was born on October 4, 1975 in Bozeman, Montana and grew up in Olympia, Washington and was a star basketball player for Olympia High School, starting on varsity for all four years.

== Career ==
She began her acting career portraying Julie Connor on the Saturday morning TNBC television series Hang Time, in which her character was the only girl on a boys' basketball team. Deutscher and her castmate Megan Parlen were the only two actors who appeared in every episode of the series.

Deutscher played the role of Wendy in the film Special Forces, her character being that of an American journalist held captive by a Muldonian warlord. Deutscher has also appeared on television in the daytime drama The Bold and the Beautiful.

== Personal life ==
She is married to her former Hang Time co-star Jay Hernandez. They were married in 2006 and had a private wedding.

== Filmography ==
- The Bold and the Beautiful – Girl #1 (1994) (TV series)
- Drifting School – Caroline (1995) (film)
- Hang Time – Julie Connor (1995–2000) (TV series)
- Malibu, CA – Jocelyn (1999) (TV series)
- Special Forces – Wendy Teller (2003) (film)
- Las Vegas – Julie Dietz (2005) (TV series)
- Aquaman – Atlanna (2006) (TV series pilot)
