= A Fistful of Datas =

- Star Trek: The Next Generation episode
- Episode no.: Season 6 Episode 8
- Directed by: Patrick Stewart
- Story by: Robert Hewitt Wolfe
- Teleplay by: Robert Hewitt Wolfe; Brannon Braga
- Production code: 234
- Original air date: November 9, 1992

Guest appearances
- Brian Bonsall - Alexander Rozhenko; John Pyper-Ferguson - Eli Hollander; Joy Garrett - Annie Meyers; Jorge Cervera, Jr. - Mexican bandito; Majel Barrett - Computer voice

Episode chronology
← Previous "Rascals"	Next → "The Quality of Life"
- Star Trek: The Next Generation season 6

"A Fistful of Datas" is the 134th episode of the American science fiction television series Star Trek: The Next Generation, the eighth episode of the sixth season, which premiered in the United States on November 9, 1992. Its title is a play on the title of the Sergio Leone "Spaghetti Western" film A Fistful of Dollars.

Set in the 24th century, the series follows the adventures of the Starfleet crew of the Federation starship Enterprise-D. In this episode, Worf, his son Alexander Rozhenko, and Deanna Troi are trapped in the holodeck where the characters resemble Data and have his superior abilities.

This episode features a scene with Data in drag, and has numerous comedy elements. It has been noted as a fun and comical episode, and praised for its use of the holodeck.

== Plot summary ==
The Enterprise has arrived 2 days early for a rendezvous with a supply ship, USS Biko, and the crew spend the extra time pursuing personal activities. Data and La Forge propose to Captain Picard to attempt to set up systems that would allow them to use Data's processing abilities to run critical systems in the case of main computer failure, and he allows them to proceed.

Meanwhile, Worf reluctantly joins his son Alexander in a holodeck adventure set in the town of Deadwood, South Dakota, in the American Old West, later joined by Deanna Troi. The three play the role of lawmen in Deadwood, where Eli Hollander, the "Butcher of Bozeman", is wanted. Worf tries to use his Starfleet tactics to end the episode quickly, but Alexander insists that he play along with the scenario. They capture Eli, learning that his father Frank is a sly and powerful man.

As Data and La Forge work on the interface, a brief energy surge occurs. The ship's systems react strangely, specifically around elements of Data's logs and records. Data also takes up stereotypical Wild West mannerisms and vernacular, unaware.

In the holodeck, Frank, who appears exactly like Data, captures Alexander, demanding the release of his son Eli. Worf gets into a gun battle and is wounded, and he and Troi find that the holodeck safety protocols are off and they cannot end the program. They realize Alexander could be in trouble and the only assured way is to play out the story. Further, Troi observes that Eli now possesses skills comparable to Data's. As more of the holodeck characters take on Data's appearance, Worf works to create a personal shield as protection, knowing he would not be victorious against characters that all have Data's skills.

Data and La Forge determine that the power surge causes segments of the main computer and Data's processes to swap memories, and they start a memory purge to restore both to normal operation.

On the holodeck, Worf and Troi successfully defeat Frank and his gang, and recover Alexander. They believe the story is now over, but the holodeck does not yet respond. Only after Miss Annie, proprietress of the local tavern and also now looking like Data, thanks Worf for his bravery and throws herself into Worf's arms, does the story end, allowing the three to leave safely. Data and the ship's computer are restored to normal, and Worf promises to join Alexander on the holodeck for another adventure in Deadwood. In private, Worf dons his cowboy hat, practices his quickdraw, and smiles at himself in the mirror. As a final nod to the Western genre where heroes are often seen riding off into the sunset, the episode concludes with the Enterprise flying toward and seemingly into a star that is half obscured by a nearby planet.

== Reception ==
In 2016, SyFy ranked this the ninth best holodeck episode of the Star Trek franchise.

In 2017, Popular Mechanics said that "A Fistful of Datas" was one of the top ten most fun episodes of Star Trek: The Next Generation, describing it as a holodeck story with an old American Western setting, with fun Star Trek characters such as Cowboy Klingon and Counselor Troi as Durango. This episode was noted in 2017 for its humorous elements, Western theme, and for Data's presentation as a woman of the old American west.

In 2019, CBR rated "A Fistful of Datas" the 13th best 'holodeck' episode of the franchise. In 2007, it was listed among holodeck episodes by Io9, who noted that Data (Brent Spiner) appears as holographic versions of himself.

In 2019, Screen Rant ranked "A Fistful of Datas" the tenth funniest episode of Star Trek: The Next Generation.

In 2020, GameSpot recommended this episode for background on the character of Data. However, they also noted this episode as one of the most bizarre moments of the series, when "Madam Data", a sort of hybrid between Brent Spiner's Data character and Saloon lady of the American West, greets Worf.

In the Red Dwarf ABC's on their season 2 DVD Bonus set, Patrick Stewart (Picard) is talking about his first experience with Red Dwarf watching the Season 6 Episode 3 episode "Gunmen of the Apocalypse". He stated that he was outraged at first because it resembled "A Fistful of Datas", but as he watched it further, he saw some differences.

== Releases ==
The episode was released as part of the Star Trek: The Next Generation season six DVD box set in the United States on December 3, 2002. A remastered HD version was released on Blu-ray optical disc, on June 24, 2014.
