= Danny Lee Clark =

American actor (born 1964)

- Born: May 21, 1964 (age 62); Zama, Kanagawa, Japan
- Other name: Nitro
- Education: San Jose State University
- Occupations: Actor; author; television personality; athlete; producer
- Years active: 1987–present

Danny Lee "Nitro" Clark (born May 21, 1964) is a former American football professional athlete, television personality, author, actor, and producer. He is best known for his role as gladiator Nitro on the TV show American Gladiators. He is also a health and fitness expert and the creator of the "Gladiator Rock'n Run".

== Biography ==
Clark began his career as an athlete, playing football for San Jose State University where he was a standout defensive lineman. Clark was also a member of Sigma Alpha Epsilon fraternity. He played briefly for the Los Angeles Rams of the National Football League, and in the Italian Football League for the Legnano Frogs in Europe for one season.

Clark, an actor, writer, TV Host, producer, and speaker, is best known from the game show American Gladiators, having worked on both the original version and the revival; from 1989 to 1992, and again in 1994–95, he was the gladiator Nitro; during the original show's final season, he was the analyst and co-host for the show. In the 2008 revival, he is the coordinating producer for the show. The original series aired in over 40 countries, with reruns on USA Network, TNT, Spike, ESPN Classic, and airs currently on Charge!. The revival aired on NBC.

When American Gladiators returned to the U.S. airwaves on ESPN Classic on April 1, 2007, the network aired a marathon of episodes. Clark was the on-air host for that marathon, telling behind-the-scenes stories and trivia about the series in between the episodes.

After American Gladiators, Clark turned to acting, appearing in such motion pictures as Death Becomes Her, with Meryl Streep, Bruce Willis, and Goldie Hawn; and Equilibrium, with Christian Bale. He has also guest starred in TV series including Ellen, Walker, Texas Ranger, California Dreams, V.I.P., Married... with Children, Who's the Boss?, Saved by the Bell, and The Brothers García.

Clark was the writer/director/producer of the independent film Looking for Bruce. He has also written several screenplays for various studios, producers, and production companies, including a bio-pic Battle of Harlem, about the first African American police officer in the NYPD.

Clark wrote his memoir Gladiator: A True Story of 'Roids, Rage, and Redemption for Simon and Schuster, published in February 2009 which was purchased by Netflix for the docuseries Muscles & Mayhem, which debuted at #1 on the charts. Clark's Company "Nitro Up Media" co-produced Netflix's Muscles & Mayhem.

Clark has appeared on a variety of talk shows including: The Tonight Show, Good Morning America, Extra TV, Entertainment Tonight, CBS Morning News, Today, and Live with Regis and Kathie Lee. He has also appeared on the cover of TV Guide and numerous other magazines.

Clark enjoys all sports, acting, writing and martial arts (he has a black belt in Taekwondo) and is often called on to perform his own stunts. Since 2002 he has also been a mentor in the Young Story Tellers program which is dedicated to increasing literacy among inner city youths. Clark makes his home in the Southern California and can often be found walking his Labradoodle, Ricky, and playing Pickleball at a nearby park.

Clark is the creator of the "Gladiator Rock'n Run," an obstacle adventure run in America that challenges participants to test their skills over a 5k to 10k course. It is publicized as the "Most Insane Day of your Life." Proceeds benefit Talk About Curing Autism and has raised hundreds of thousand of dollars for the cause.

Clark was a contestant featured in the bull riding reality show, Ty Murray's Celebrity Bull Riding Challenge, which premiered in August 2007 on CMT.

In 2017, Clark released his 2nd Bestselling book "F Dying" about his journey after his 2013 heart attack. He also gave a TEDx talk that has over 500k views about "How to live a Happy life."

== Filmography ==
- Death Becomes Her (1992)
- Twin Sitters (1994)
- Special Forces (2003)
