= Lan O'Kun =

American screenwriter (1932–2020)

- Born: January 13, 1932; New York City, U.S.
- Died: January 9, 2020 (aged 87); Malibu, California, U.S.
- Education: Syracuse University
- Occupations: Screenwriter, playwright, lyricist, composer
- Spouse: Barbara O’Kun
- Children: 1 son
- Relatives: Shari Lewis (sister-in-law); Mallory Lewis (niece)

Lan O'Kun (January 13, 1932 – January 9, 2020) was an American screenwriter, playwright, lyricist and composer. He was a television writer for That Was the Week That Was, Apple's Way, The Love Boat, Star Trek: The Next Generation, Highway to Heaven, and The Twilight Zone. He worked as a composer for Barbra Streisand and had a long collaboration with his sister-in-law, and entertainer, Shari Lewis, which brought to life her puppets Lamb Chop, Charlie Horse, and Hush Puppy.
