= Hillary Tuck =

American former actress (born 1978)

- Born: July 1, 1978 (age 48); Kerrville, Texas
- Other names: Hilary Tuck; Hillary Croll
- Occupation: Actress
- Years active: 1994–2019
- Spouse: Bobby Croll (m. 2010)
- Children: 2

Hillary Tuck (born July 1, 1978) is an American former actress. She started as a child actress, including roles in the NBC Saturday Morning sitcom Hang Time (1995–1996) and Disney's Honey, I Shrunk the Kids: The TV Show.

She has also guest starred in such television series as Roseanne, Boy Meets World, Judging Amy, House, The Closer, Bones, Ghost Whisperer, 90210 and others.

Tuck has also appeared in the feature films Camp Nowhere (1994), The Great Mom Swap (1995), Life as a House (2001) and The Visitation (2006). She also played a new intern in the 2001 film How to Make a Monster. She also appeared in guest roles in The Mentalist (2012) and Grimm (2015). Her last appearance was a credit as "victim's wife" in a 2019 episode of Bosch.

Tuck married Bobby Croll in 2010; together, the couple have son Jasper and daughter Cleo.

== Filmography ==
=== Film ===
Year	Title	Role	Notes
1994	Camp Nowhere	Betty Stoller	
2004	The Wild Card	Jennifer Flanagan	Video
2006	The Visitation	Darlene Henchle	
2012	The Debt Collector		Short
2013	Wrong Cops	Kylie	
2014	April Rain	Angela	
2019	The Art of Being		

=== Television ===
Year	Title	Role	Notes
1994–1996	Boy Meets World	Samantha, Sarah & Kristen	Episodes: "Pairing Off", "On the Air" & "The Happiest Show on Earth"
1995	The Great Mom Swap	Karen Ridgeway	TV film
1995	Hang Time	Samantha Morgan	Main role (season 1)
1996	Roseanne	Kiki	Episode: "Hoi Polloi Meets Hoiti Toiti"
1997–2000	Honey, I Shrunk the Kids: The TV Show	Amy Szalinski	Main role
2003	10-8: Officers on Duty	Carrie Chandler	Episode: "Badlands"
2004	Center of the Universe	Rebecca	Episode: "Good Parenting, Bad Parenting"
2005	Without a Trace	Becky	Episode: "Neither Rain Nor Sleet"
2005	Judging Amy	Jessica Zicklin	Episode: "Sorry I Missed You"
2005	Family Guy	Patty / Cecilia (voice)	Episode: "8 Simple Rules for Buying My Teenage Daughter"
2005	Cold Case	Vicky Leoni (1978)	Episode: "Bad Night"
2006	The Hunters	Cat Hunter	TV film
2006	House	Kara Mason	Episode: "Forever"
2006	The Closer	Kendall Price	Episode: "No Good Deed"
2007	Bones	Abby Singer	Episode: "The Glowing Bones in the Old Stone House"
2008	Ghost Whisperer	Julia Henderson	Episode: "Save Our Souls"
2009	Three Rivers	Teri Dawson	Episode: "Place of Life"
2009	Always and Forever	Rachel Foster	TV film
2009	Grey's Anatomy	Julie Jacobson	Episode: "Holidaze"
2009	Life's Chronicles	Denise	TV film
2010	In Plain Sight	Gina Lucas	Episode: "A Priest Walks Into a Bar"
2010	90210	Erin	Episode: "They're Playing Her Song"
2011	NCIS	Justine Booth	Episode: "The Penelope Papers"
2012	The Mentalist	Kelly	Episode: "Ruby Slippers"
2012	Necessary Roughness	Layla	Episode: "A Load of Bull"
2013	Longmire	Linda James	Episode: "The Road to Hell"
2013	Franklin & Bash	Jill	Episode: "By the Numbers"
2015	Grimm	Maggie Bowden	Episode: "Iron Hans"
2017	Wisdom of the Crowd	Miranda Vincent	Episode: "Machine Learning"
2018	Sorry for Your Loss	Tara	Episode: "The Penguin and The Mechanic"
2019	Bosch	Victim's Wife	Episode: "Pill Shills"
