= The Great Mom Swap =

1995 film by Jonathan Prince

- Genre: Comedy
- Written by: Maryedith Burrell
- Directed by: Jonathan Prince
- Starring: Shelley Fabares; Valerie Harper; Mary Kate Schellhardt; Hillary Tuck; Sid Caesar; Andrew Kavovit; Kelsey Mulrooney
- Music by: David Lawrence
- Country of origin: United States
- Original language: English

Production
- Executive producer: Richard Welsh
- Producers: Brent Shields; Richard Welsh
- Production locations: 1090 Rubio Street, Altadena, California
- Cinematography: Sandi Sissel
- Editors: Jim Oliver; Brian Fassett
- Running time: 120 minutes (including commercials)
- Production company: Signboard Hill Productions

Original release
- Network: ABC
- Release: September 23, 1995

The Great Mom Swap is a 1995 American made for television comedy film directed by Jonathan Prince and starring Shelley Fabares, Valerie Harper, Mary Kate Schellhardt, Hillary Tuck, Sid Caesar, Andrew Kavovit and Kelsey Mulrooney. It is based on the novel of the same name by Betsy Haynes. It premiered on ABC on September 23, 1995 and was released on video by Hallmark Entertainment.

== Plot ==
Terri Venessi (Mary Kate Schellhardt), a local straight-A student and ‘deli girl’, always seems to be at odds with the cheerleading captain, Karen Ridgeway (Hillary Tuck). Terri is the daughter of Grace (Valerie Harper) who is a widow and Karen is the daughter of Millie (Shelley Fabares) who have been known rivals since the day their friendship was strained. One day, their pranks on each other go too far when a revenge-fueled stink bomb in Karen's locker gets out of hand and the school has to be evacuated for two days as a result.

The girls are called to the Principal's office where they and their mothers meet with Officer Patricia Smith (Esther Scott). Although she initially plans to have them sent to a work farm, Officer Smith instead tells them that the girls should switch lives for a while to experience the other girl's life even upon also noticing that both mothers act the same way toward each other. Under threat of expulsion, the girls and their families agree.

Karen's family is quite affluent, but both parents work and are gone quite a bit. As a result, Karen, when she was home had to take care of her little sister Tiffany (Kelsey Mulrooney), and now Terri is made to do it, despite having no babysitting experience or siblings of her own. Tiffany (who is constantly telling "Knock-knock jokes") gets on Terri's nerves at first, but eventually, she comes to think of Terri as a "sister-figure", especially during a thunderstorm, which causes a temporary loss of power. During the switch, Terri learns that Karen never stands up for herself to her mom who grew up in the neighborhood with Terri's mom, and is now a social climber. While at Karen's, Terri and Karen's brother David (Andrew Kavovit) discover they like each other, especially after Karen gives Terri a "makeover."

At Terri's house, Karen is living with Grace and grandfather Papa Tognetti (Sid Caesar). Terri's is a blue-collar family that runs an Italian deli. Karen's friends make fun of Terri and now are making fun of Karen, who discovers that her "friends" are very superficial. Her "best friend" Nicole Henderson (Marnette Patterson) starts snubbing her and even tries to steal her boyfriend Chad Elkins (Hunter Garner), which causes problems for the couple. She also discovers that Terri's mom is much more "hands on" than her own mother and doesn't like things to change. She also can be very controlling. As time goes on, Karen starts to bond with Papa and even joins in the search when he turns up missing.

As a result of the switch, Millie and Grace gain perspective and restore their friendship. They apparently had a falling out when they were teens. Grandpa moves to a retirement village (he wasn't missing after all). Terri and Karen discover they like themselves and each other. Millie decides her family is more important than her clubs and Grace quits trying to hide in the past and embrace life again. Everyone benefits from the Mom Swap, especially Terri and David, who go to Prom together, and Karen and Chad, who are voted Prom Queen and King, but not before Nicole gets called out for trying to rig the election. Karen and Terri end up as best friends.

== Cast ==
- Shelley Fabares as Millie Ridgeway
- Valerie Harper as Grace Vanessi
- Mary Kate Schellhardt as Terri Vanessi
- Hillary Tuck as Karen Ridgeway
- Sid Caesar as Papa Tognett
- Andrew Kavovit as David Ridgeway
- Kelsey Mulrooney as Tiffany Ridgeway
- Vasili Bogazianos as Jack Ridgeway
- Lance Robinson as Louis
- Marnette Patterson as Nicole Henderson
- Hunter Garner as Chad Elkins
- Kenneth Tigar as Mr. Harlow
- Esther Scott as Officer Patricia Smith
