= Peak Performance (Star Trek: The Next Generation) =

- Star Trek: The Next Generation episode
- Episode no.: Season 2 Episode 21
- Directed by: Robert Scheerer
- Written by: David Kemper
- Cinematography by: Edward R. Brown
- Production code: 147
- Original air date: July 10, 1989

Guest appearances
- Roy Brocksmith – Sirna Kolrami; Armin Shimerman – Bractor; David L. Lander – Ferengi Tactical Officer; Leslie Neale – Nagel; Glenn Morshower – Burke

Episode chronology
← Previous "The Emissary"	Next → "Shades of Gray"
- Star Trek: The Next Generation season 2

"Peak Performance" is the twenty-first and penultimate episode of the second season of the American science fiction television series Star Trek: The Next Generation, the 47th episode overall, first broadcast on July 10, 1989.

Set in the 24th century, the series follows the adventures of the Starfleet crew of the Federation starship Enterprise-D. In this episode, while in the midst of a war-game exercise, a Ferengi marauder intrudes.

== Plot ==
To prepare for the Borg threat, the Enterprise is ordered to participate in combat simulations. Sirna Kolrami, a renowned Zakdorn strategist, will observe and mediate the exercise. Commander Riker challenges Kolrami to a game of Strategema despite knowing he cannot win, just for the honor of playing a grandmaster. Doctor Pulaski pushes Data to challenge the arrogant Kolrami, assuming he will be no match for Data's android capabilities. However, Data is also soundly beaten, causing him to believe he is malfunctioning and remove himself from duty.

For the simulation, Riker will command an 80-year-old retired Federation ship, Hathaway, with Chief Engineer Geordi La Forge, Lt. Worf and Acting Ensign Wesley Crusher as his senior staff. Hathaway is easily outclassed by Enterprise, and as it has no antimatter, warp speed is impossible. Wesley slips back aboard the Enterprise and transports a school project containing trace amounts of antimatter, potentially allowing Hathaway a short warp burst.

Pulaski and Counselor Troi are unable to persuade Data that he is not malfunctioning, but Captain Picard reminds him of his duty, advising him, "It is possible to commit no mistakes and still lose. That is not a weakness; that is life.” Data returns to the bridge, his confidence restored.

As the battle begins, Worf creates a distraction by using Enterprise's sensors to generate an illusory Romulan warship, and the Hathaway scores the first hits. As Enterprise prepares to retaliate, another ship — a Ferengi marauder — appears. Picard realizes too late that this ship is genuine, and the Ferengi attack leaves the Enterprise's phasers locked in simulation mode, unable to return fire.

Ferengi commander DaiMon Bractor, unaware of the wargames, concludes the Hathaway must be valuable and demands that Picard surrender it to him. Picard and Riker devise a risky plan: the Enterprise fires photon torpedoes at the Hathaway, who use their short warp burst to jump to safety just before impact. Believing their prize has been destroyed, the Ferengi target the Enterprise, but Worf tricks their sensors into detecting another Federation ship, causing them to flee.

With the wargames over, Data challenges Kolrami to a Strategema rematch. This time, Data holds Kolrami in check, leading Kolrami to quit in frustration. Data explains that he gave up opportunities for advancement in order to maintain a stalemate; he initially regards the result as a draw, but after prodding from Pulaski, admits his victory.

== Production ==
This episode is noted for featuring special effect sequences with a Constellation-class starship in outer space. This design was used previously on the show in the first-season episode "The Battle" and appears in several other episodes.

== Reception ==
At its original broadcast, the episode was seen by 9.4% of American households, as estimated by the episode's Nielsen Rating.

Zack Handlen of The A.V. Club gave the episode a B+, calling it a "solid entry" that allows "nearly every major character a moment to shine." Keith DeCandido of Reactor magazine rated the episode 7 out of 10. He thought the dialogue was excellent and the episode displayed some great camaraderie between the cast, showing how well they can work together. His main complaint was that the finale with the Ferengi ship didn't hold together logically, with arbitrary damage to the Enterprise seemingly designed to set up an achievable challenge.

A June 2019 list of the best Star Trek episodes published by Screen Rant rated "Peak Performance" the eighth best, and mentioned the famous quotable line of Picard that "It is possible to commit no mistakes and still lose". Screen Rant continued to update their list, ranking it as #13 in a 2020 version, but removing it by their 2025 version.
