= Megan Parlen =

American actress (born 1980)

- Born: July 9, 1980 (age 46)
- Occupation: Actress
- Years active: 1987–present
- Known for: Hang Time; Rascals

Megan Parlen (born July 9, 1980) is an American actress. She is best known for her role as Mary-Beth Pepperton on the NBC series Hang Time (1995–2000).

== Filmography ==
=== Acting ===
- Walk Like a Man (1987) - Little Girl
- Sisters (1990) - Tina Wyles
- My Heroes Have Always Been Cowboys (1991) - Becky
- Snoopy's Reunion (1991) - Lila Allcroft (voice)
- Star Trek: The Next Generation (1992) - young Ro Laren (episode: "Rascals")
- Boy Meets World (1993) - Barbara (episode: "Cory's Alternative Friends")
- Lois & Clark: The New Adventures of Superman (1994) - Girl #1 (episode: "Witness")
- Dad, the Angel and Me (1995) - Charlotte
- Hang Time (1995–2000) - Mary-Beth Pepperton
- Saved by the Bell: The New Class (1996) - Mary Beth Pepperton (episode: "The Kiss")
- Something So Right (1997) - Cindy
- Elysium (2003) - Lydia (voice, animated film)
- Gladius (2003) - Additional Voices
- Nicktoons Movin' (2004) - Reggie Rocket
- Intel:USA (2007–2012)... - Leona McCormick

=== Producing ===
- This Film Is Not Yet Rated (2006) - Associate producer
- Operation Homecoming (2007) - Production coordinator
- Young Scientists (2008) - Associate producer
- Popular Science's Future Of... (2009) - Producer
- National Geographic Explorer: Born to Rage (2010) - Associate producer
- Vanished from Alcatraz (2010) - Associate producer
- Through the Wormhole with Morgan Freeman (2010–2013) - Producer

== Awards and nominations ==
Year	Award	Category	Title of work	Result
1997	YoungStar Award	Best Performance by a Young Actress in a Saturday Morning TV Program	Hang Time	Won
1998	YoungStar Award	Best Performance by a Young Actress in a Saturday Morning TV Program	Hang Time	Nominated
1999	YoungStar Award	Best Performance by a Young Actress in a Saturday Morning TV Program	Hang Time	Nominated
