= 1995–96 United States network television schedule (daytime) =

The following is the 1995–96 daytime network television schedule for the six major English-language commercial broadcast networks in the United States. It covers the weekday and weekend daytime hours from September 1995 to August 1996. The schedule is followed by a list per network of returning series, new series, and series canceled after the 1995–96 season.

This was the first season in which The WB and UPN – which both launched in mid-January of that year – offered daytime programming, composed entirely of children's programming blocks on the respective networks: The WB aired its Kids' WB block on weekday afternoons and Saturday mornings, while UPN aired the hour-long UPN Kids block on Sunday mornings.

Affiliates fill time periods not occupied by network programs with local or syndicated programming. PBS – which offers daytime programming through a children's program block, branded as PTV at the time – is not included, as its member television stations have local flexibility over most of their schedules and broadcast times for network shows may vary.

== Legend ==
- Light yellow indicates talk shows.
- Green indicates soap operas.
- Pink indicates game shows.
- Gold indicates news and public affairs programming.
- Light teal indicates sporting events.
- White indicates local programming.
- Light purple indicates children's and/or E/I-compliant programming.
- Gray indicates encore programming (e.g., reruns of prime-time programming).
- White with red border indicates other programs not applicable to the above categorizations.
- New series are highlighted in **bold**.

== Schedule ==
- All times correspond to U.S. Eastern and Pacific Time scheduling (except for some live sports or events). Except where affiliates slot certain programs outside their network-dictated timeslots, subtract one hour for Central, Mountain, Alaska, and Hawaii-Aleutian times.
- Local schedules may differ, as affiliates have the option to pre-empt or delay network programs. Such scheduling may be limited to preemptions caused by local or national breaking news or weather coverage (which may force stations to tape delay certain programs in overnight timeslots or defer them to a co-operated or contracted station in their regular timeslot) and any major sports events scheduled to air in a weekday timeslot (mainly during major holidays). Stations may air shows at other times at their preference.

=== Monday–Friday ===
Network		6:00 am	6:30 am	7:00 am	7:30 am	8:00 am	8:30 am	9:00 am	9:30 am	10:00 am	10:30 am	11:00 am	11:30 am	noon	12:30 pm	1:00 pm	1:30 pm	2:00 pm	2:30 pm	3:00 pm	3:30 pm	4:00 pm	4:30 pm	5:00 pm	5:30 pm	6:00 pm	6:30 pm
ABC	Fall	ABC World News This Morning		Good Morning America				Local/syndicated programming				Mike and Maty		Local/syndicated programming	Loving	All My Children		One Life to Live		General Hospital		Local/syndicated programming					ABC World News Tonight with Peter Jennings
ABC	Late Fall	ABC World News This Morning		Good Morning America				Local/syndicated programming				Mike and Maty		Local/syndicated programming	**The City** (11/13)	All My Children		One Life to Live		General Hospital		Local/syndicated programming					ABC World News Tonight with Peter Jennings
ABC	Summer	ABC World News This Morning		Good Morning America				Local/syndicated programming				**Caryl & Marilyn: Real Friends** (6/10)		Local/syndicated programming	**The City** (11/13)	All My Children		One Life to Live		General Hospital		Local/syndicated programming					ABC World News Tonight with Peter Jennings
CBS		CBS Morning News		CBS This Morning				Local/syndicated programming				The Price Is Right		Local/syndicated programming	The Young and the Restless		The Bold and the Beautiful	As the World Turns		Guiding Light		Local/syndicated programming					CBS Evening News with Dan Rather
NBC	Fall	NBC News at Sunrise		Today				Local/syndicated programming		Leeza				Local/syndicated programming		Days of Our Lives		Another World		Local/syndicated programming							NBC Nightly News with Tom Brokaw
NBC	Spring	NBC News at Sunrise		Today				Local/syndicated programming		Real Life with Jane Pauley		Leeza		Local/syndicated programming		Days of Our Lives		Another World		Local/syndicated programming							NBC Nightly News with Tom Brokaw
Fox	Fall	Local/syndicated programming			Bobby's World	The Fox Cubhouse	Local/syndicated programming													Taz-Mania (R)	X-Men	The Adventures of Batman & Robin	Mighty Morphin Power Rangers / **Goosebumps** (Fri., starting Oct. 27) / **Siegfried & Roy: Masters of the Impossible** (Mon.-Thu., from Feb. 19-22)	Local/syndicated programming			
Fox	February	Local/syndicated programming			Bobby's World	The Fox Cubhouse	Local/syndicated programming													Taz-Mania (R)	Eek! Stravaganza	The Adventures of Batman & Robin	Mighty Morphin Power Rangers / **Goosebumps** (Fri., starting Oct. 27) / **Siegfried & Roy: Masters of the Impossible** (Mon.-Thu., from Feb. 19-22)	Local/syndicated programming			
Fox	April	Local/syndicated programming			Bobby's World	Jim Henson's Animal Show	Local/syndicated programming													Taz-Mania (R)	Eek! Stravaganza	The Adventures of Batman & Robin	**Power Rangers Zeo** (Mon.-Thu.); Goosebumps (Fri.)	Local/syndicated programming			
Fox	June	Local/syndicated programming			Eek! Stravaganza	Rimba's Island	Local/syndicated programming													Taz-Mania (R)	Bobby's World	The Adventures of Batman & Robin	Mighty Morphin Power Rangers (Mon.-Thu.); Goosebumps (Fri.)	Local/syndicated programming			
Fox	August	Local/syndicated programming			Eek! Stravaganza	Budgie the Little Helicopter	Local/syndicated programming													Taz-Mania (R)	Bobby's World	The Adventures of Batman & Robin	Power Rangers Zeo (Mon.-Thu.); X-Men (Fri.)	Local/syndicated programming			
The WB		Local/syndicated programming																				**That's Warner Bros.!**	Animaniacs	Local and/or syndicated programming			

Notes:

- ABC, NBC and CBS offered their early morning newscasts via a looping feed (usually running as late as 10:00 a.m. Pacific Time) to accommodate local scheduling in the westernmost contiguous time zones or for use a filler programming for stations that do not offer a local morning newscast; some stations without a morning newscast may air syndicated or time-lease programs instead of the full newscast loop.
- NBC allowed owned-and-operated and affiliated stations the preference of airing Another World and Days of Our Lives in reverse order from the network's recommended scheduling.
- Loving aired its last episode on ABC on November 10, 1995; The City, a New York City-set spin-off that initially featured 12 characters that appeared on Loving at the time of the latter's cancellation, premiered in its place on November 13. Both soap operas were fed to affiliates at Noon/11:00 a.m. CT or 12:30 p.m./11:30 a.m. CT, depending on local scheduling preference.

=== Saturday ===
Network		7:00 am	7:30 am	8:00 am	8:30 am	9:00 am	9:30 am	10:00 am	10:30 am	11:00 am	11:30 am	noon	12:30 pm	1:00 pm	1:30 pm	2:00 pm	2:30 pm	3:00 pm	3:30 pm	4:00 pm	4:30 pm	5:00 pm	5:30 pm	6:00 pm	6:30 pm
ABC	Fall	Local and/or syndicated programming		**The New Adventures of Madeline**	Free Willy	George of the Jungle (R)	Bump in the Night	Fudge / Schoolhouse Rock! (10:56 am)	ReBoot	The Bugs Bunny and Tweety Show / Schoolhouse Rock! (11:56 am)		**What-a-Mess**	ABC Weekend Special	College Football on ABC											
ABC	October	Local and/or syndicated programming		**The New Adventures of Madeline**	Free Willy	**Dumb and Dumber**	Bump in the Night	Fudge / Schoolhouse Rock! (10:56 am)	ReBoot	The Bugs Bunny and Tweety Show / Schoolhouse Rock! (11:56 am)		**What-a-Mess**	ABC Weekend Special	College Football on ABC											
ABC	Winter	Local and/or syndicated programming		The New Adventures of Winnie the Pooh (R)	Free Willy	**Dumb and Dumber**	Bump in the Night	Fudge / Schoolhouse Rock! (10:56 am)	ReBoot	The Bugs Bunny and Tweety Show / Schoolhouse Rock! (11:56 am)		**What-a-Mess**	ABC Weekend Special	ABC Sports and/or local programming										Local news	ABC World News Saturday
ABC	Spring	Local and/or syndicated programming		The New Adventures of Winnie the Pooh (R)	Free Willy	Bump in the Night	Fudge	**Hypernauts** / Schoolhouse Rock! (10:56 am)	ReBoot	The Bugs Bunny and Tweety Show / Schoolhouse Rock! (11:56 am)		**What-a-Mess**	ABC Weekend Special	ABC Sports and/or local programming										Local news	ABC World News Saturday
ABC	Summer	Local and/or syndicated programming		The New Adventures of Winnie the Pooh (R)	Free Willy	Fudge	Bump in the Night	The Bugs Bunny and Tweety Show / Schoolhouse Rock! (10:56 am)		Fudge	ReBoot	**What-a-Mess**	ABC Weekend Special	ABC Sports and/or local programming										Local news	ABC World News Saturday
ABC	Late July	Local and/or syndicated programming		The New Adventures of Winnie the Pooh (R)	Free Willy	Fudge	Bump in the Night	The Bugs Bunny and Tweety Show / Schoolhouse Rock! (10:56 am)		Fudge	**Aliens in the Family**	**What-a-Mess**	ABC Weekend Special	ABC Sports and/or local programming										Local news	ABC World News Saturday
CBS	Fall	Local and/or syndicated programming		Garfield and Friends (R)	**The Lion King's Timon & Pumbaa**	Aladdin	Teenage Mutant Ninja Turtles	**The Mask: Animated Series**	**Santo Bugito**	**The Twisted Tales of Felix the Cat**	Teenage Mutant Ninja Turtles	Beakman's World	**Really Wild Animals**	CBS Sports and/or local programming										Local news	CBS Evening News
CBS	October	Local and/or syndicated programming		**The Adventures of Hyperman**	**The Lion King's Timon & Pumbaa**	Aladdin	Teenage Mutant Ninja Turtles	**The Mask: Animated Series**	**Santo Bugito**	**The Twisted Tales of Felix the Cat**	Teenage Mutant Ninja Turtles	Beakman's World	**Really Wild Animals**	CBS Sports and/or local programming										Local news	CBS Evening News
CBS	January	Local and/or syndicated programming		**The Adventures of Hyperman**	**The Lion King's Timon & Pumbaa**	Aladdin	Teenage Mutant Ninja Turtles	**The Mask: Animated Series**	**Ace Ventura: Pet Detective**	**The Twisted Tales of Felix the Cat**	**Santo Bugito**	Beakman's World	**Really Wild Animals**	CBS Sports and/or local programming										Local news	CBS Evening News
CBS	February	Local and/or syndicated programming		Teenage Mutant Ninja Turtles	**The Lion King's Timon & Pumbaa**	Aladdin	Teenage Mutant Ninja Turtles	**The Mask: Animated Series**	**Ace Ventura: Pet Detective**	**The Twisted Tales of Felix the Cat**	**Santo Bugito**	Beakman's World	**Really Wild Animals**	CBS Sports and/or local programming										Local news	CBS Evening News
CBS	Summer	Local and/or syndicated programming		**Santo Bugito**	**The Lion King's Timon & Pumbaa**	Aladdin	Teenage Mutant Ninja Turtles	**The Mask: Animated Series**	**Ace Ventura: Pet Detective**	**The Twisted Tales of Felix the Cat**	The Adventures of Hyperman	Beakman's World	**Really Wild Animals**	CBS Sports and/or local programming										Local news	CBS Evening News
NBC		Local and/or syndicated programming		Saturday Today				Saved by the Bell: The New Class	**Hang Time**	Saved by the Bell: The New Class	California Dreams	NBA Inside Stuff	NBC Sports and/or local programming					NBC Sports programming						Local news	NBC Nightly News
Fox	Fall	Local and/or syndicated programming		Where on Earth Is Carmen Sandiego?	Eek! Stravaganza	Mighty Morphin Power Rangers	**Masked Rider**	Spider-Man	The Tick	X-Men	**Life with Louie**	Local and/or syndicated programming													
Fox	Spring	Local and/or syndicated programming		Where on Earth Is Carmen Sandiego?	**The Spooktacular New Adventures of Casper**	Mighty Morphin Power Rangers	**Masked Rider**	Spider-Man	X-Men	The Tick	**Life with Louie**	Fox Sports and/or local programming													
Fox	late-Spring	Local and/or syndicated programming		Where on Earth Is Carmen Sandiego?	Masked Rider	**Power Rangers Zeo**	Attack of the Killer Tomatoes (R)	The Spooktacular New Adventures of Casper	Spider-Man	X-Men	**Life with Louie**	Fox Sports and/or local programming													
Fox	Summer	Local and/or syndicated programming		Masked Rider	Bobby's World	**Power Rangers Zeo**	Attack of the Killer Tomatoes (R)	The Spooktacular New Adventures of Casper	Goosebumps	Spider-Man	**Life with Louie**	**In the Zone**	Fox Sports and/or local programming												
The WB	Fall	Local and/or syndicated programming		Animaniacs	**The Sylvester & Tweety Mysteries**	Animaniacs	**Pinky and the Brain**	**Freakazoid!**	**Earthworm Jim**	Local and/or syndicated programming															
The WB	Winter	Local and/or syndicated programming		The Sylvester & Tweety Mysteries	Animaniacs	Animaniacs	**Pinky and the Brain**	**Freakazoid!**	**Earthworm Jim**	Local and/or syndicated programming															

Notes:

- CBS temporarily aired Garfield and Friends at 8:00 a.m. ET from September 16 to October 7 alongside Timon and Pumbaa at the same slot from October 25 to November 18.
- On December 9, 1995, ABC replaced The New Adventures of Madeline (which had been canceled due to low ratings) with reruns of The New Adventures of Winnie the Pooh.

=== Sunday ===
Network		7:00 am	7:30 am	8:00 am	8:30 am	9:00 am	9:30 am	10:00 am	10:30 am	11:00 am	11:30 am	noon	12:30 pm	1:00 pm	1:30 pm	2:00 pm	2:30 pm	3:00 pm	3:30 pm	4:00 pm	4:30 pm	5:00 pm	5:30 pm	6:00 pm	6:30 pm
ABC		Local and/or syndicated programming		Good Morning America Sunday		This Week with David Brinkley		Local and/or syndicated programming		ABC Sports and/or local programming														Local news	ABC World News Sunday
CBS		Local and/or syndicated programming				CBS News Sunday Morning			Face the Nation	Local and/or syndicated programming		CBS Sports and/or local programming												Local news	CBS Evening News
NBC	Fall	Local and/or syndicated programming		Sunday Today		Meet the Press		Local and/or syndicated programming				NFL on NBC												Local news	NBC Nightly News
NBC	Mid-winter	Local and/or syndicated programming		Sunday Today		Meet the Press		Local and/or syndicated programming				NBC Sports and/or local programming												Local news	NBC Nightly News
Fox	Fall	Local and/or syndicated programming										Fox NFL Sunday		Fox NFL and/or local programming or another Fox Sports event											
Fox	Mid-winter	Local and/or syndicated programming										Fox Sports and/or local programming												Local and/or syndicated programming	
Fox	Spring	Local and/or syndicated programming				**Fox News Sunday**		Local and/or syndicated programming				Fox Sports and/or local programming												Local and/or syndicated programming	
UPN		Local and/or syndicated programming						**Space Strikers**	**Teknoman**	Local and/or syndicated programming															

== By network ==
=== ABC ===
Returning series:

- ABC Weekend Special
- ABC World News This Morning
- ABC World News Tonight with Peter Jennings
- All My Children
- The Bugs Bunny and Tweety Show
- Bump in the Night
- Free Willy
- Fudge
- General Hospital
- Good Morning America
- Good Morning America Sunday
- Loving
- Mike and Maty
- The New Adventures of Winnie the Pooh (reruns)
- One Life to Live
- ReBoot
- Schoolhouse Rock!
- This Week with David Brinkley

New series:

- **Caryl & Marilyn: Real Friends**
- **The City**
- **Dumb and Dumber**
- **George of the Jungle** (reruns)
- **Hypernauts**
- **The New Adventures of Madeline**
- **What-a-Mess**

Not returning from 1994–95:

- The Addams Family (reruns)
- Cro
- Free Willy
- Sonic the Hedgehog
- Tales from the Cryptkeeper

=== CBS ===
Returning series:

- Aladdin
- As the World Turns
- Beakman's World
- The Bold and the Beautiful
- CBS Evening News
- CBS Morning News
- CBS News Sunday Morning
- CBS This Morning
- Face the Nation
- Garfield and Friends (reruns)
- Guiding Light
- The Mask: Animated Series
- The Price Is Right
- Teenage Mutant Ninja Turtles
- The Young and the Restless

New series:

- **Ace Ventura: Pet Detective**
- **The Adventures of Hyperman**
- **Really Wild Animals**
- **Santo Bugito**
- **The Lion King's Timon & Pumbaa**
- **The Twisted Tales of Felix the Cat**

Not returning from 1994–95:

- Beethoven
- Disney's The Little Mermaid
- Skeleton Warriors
- Wild C.A.T.s

=== Fox ===
Returning series:

- Fox Kids Network
  - The Adventures of Batman & Robin
  - Attack of the Killer Tomatoes (reruns)
  - Bobby's World
  - Eek! Stravaganza
  - The Fox Cubhouse
  - Mighty Morphin Power Rangers
  - Spider-Man
  - Taz-Mania
  - The Tick
  - Where on Earth Is Carmen Sandiego?
  - X-Men

New series:

- Fox Kids Network
  - **Goosebumps**
  - **Life with Louie**
  - **Masked Rider**
  - **Power Rangers Zeo**
  - **Siegfried & Roy: Masters of the Impossible**
  - **The Spooktacular New Adventures of Casper**
- **Fox News Sunday**
- **In the Zone**

Not returning from 1994–95:

- Fox Kids Network
  - Animaniacs (moved to The WB)
  - Dog City
  - Droopy, Master Detective
  - Tiny Toon Adventures (reruns)

=== NBC ===
Returning series:

- Another World
- Days of Our Lives
- Leeza
- Meet the Press
- NBC News at Sunrise
- NBC Nightly News
- Real Life with Jane Pauley
- Saturday Today
- Sunday Today
- Today
- TNBC
  - California Dreams
  - NBA Inside Stuff
  - Saved by the Bell: The New Class

New series:

- TNBC
  - **Hang Time**

Not returning from 1994–95:

- The Jane Whitney Show
- The Other Side
- TNBC
  - Name Your Adventure

=== UPN ===
New series:

- **Space Strikers**
- **Teknoman**

=== The WB ===
Returning series:

- Animaniacs (moved from Fox)

New series:

- **Kids WB!**
  - **Earthworm Jim**
  - **Freakazoid!**
  - **Pinky and the Brain**
  - **The Sylvester & Tweety Mysteries**
  - **That's Warner Bros.!**

== See also ==
- 1995-96 United States network television schedule (prime-time)
- 1995-96 United States network television schedule (late night)

== Sources ==
- abc_day
- cbs_day
- nbc_day
- Fox Kids Weekday Lineups (1995–1997)
- Kids WB! Schedule
