= 1996–97 United States network television schedule (daytime) =

The following is the 1996–97 daytime network television schedule for the six major English-language commercial broadcast networks in the United States. It covers the weekday and weekend daytime hours from September 1996 to August 1997. The schedule is followed by a list per network of returning series, new series, and series canceled after the 1995–96 season.

Affiliates fill time periods not occupied by network programs with local or syndicated programming. PBS – which offers daytime programming through a children's program block, branded as PTV at the time – is not included, as its member television stations have local flexibility over most of their schedules and broadcast times for network shows may vary.

== Legend ==
- Light yellow indicates talk shows.
- Green indicates soap operas.
- Pink indicates game shows.
- Gold indicates news and public affairs programming.
- Light teal indicates sporting events.
- White indicates local programming.
- Light purple indicates children's and/or E/I-compliant programming.
- Gray indicates encore programming (e.g., reruns of prime-time programming).
- White with red border indicates other programs not applicable to the above categorizations.
- New series are highlighted in **bold**.

== Schedule ==
- All times correspond to U.S. Eastern and Pacific Time scheduling (except for some live sports or events). Except where affiliates slot certain programs outside their network-dictated timeslots, subtract one hour for Central, Mountain, Alaska, and Hawaii-Aleutian times.
- Local schedules may differ, as affiliates have the option to pre-empt or delay network programs. Such scheduling may be limited to preemptions caused by local or national breaking news or weather coverage (which may force stations to tape delay certain programs in overnight timeslots or defer them to a co-operated or contracted station in their regular timeslot) and any major sports events scheduled to air in a weekday timeslot (mainly during major holidays). Stations may air shows at other times at their preference.

=== Monday–Friday ===
Network		6:00 am	6:30 am	7:00 am	7:30 am	8:00 am	8:30 am	9:00 am	9:30 am	10:00 am	10:30 am	11:00 am	11:30 am	noon	12:30 pm	1:00 pm	1:30 pm	2:00 pm	2:30 pm	3:00 pm	3:30 pm	4:00 pm	4:30 pm	5:00 pm	5:30 pm	6:00 pm	6:30 pm
ABC	Fall	ABC World News This Morning		Good Morning America				Local/syndicated programming				Caryl & Marilyn: Real Friends		Local/syndicated programming	The City	All My Children		One Life to Live		General Hospital		Local/syndicated programming					ABC World News Tonight with Peter Jennings
ABC	Spring	ABC World News This Morning		Good Morning America				Local/syndicated programming				Caryl & Marilyn: Real Friends		Local/syndicated programming	All My Children / One Life to Live / General Hospital Classics (3/31)	All My Children		One Life to Live		General Hospital		Local/syndicated programming					ABC World News Tonight with Peter Jennings
ABC	Summer	ABC World News This Morning		Good Morning America				Local/syndicated programming				**The View** (8/11)		Local/syndicated programming	**Port Charles** (6/1)	All My Children		One Life to Live		General Hospital		Local/syndicated programming					ABC World News Tonight with Peter Jennings
CBS		CBS Morning News		CBS This Morning				Local/syndicated programming				The Price Is Right		Local/syndicated programming	The Young and the Restless		The Bold and the Beautiful	As the World Turns		Guiding Light		Local/syndicated programming					CBS Evening News with Dan Rather
NBC	Fall	NBC News at Sunrise		Today				Local/syndicated programming		Real Life with Jane Pauley		Leeza		Local/syndicated programming		Days of Our Lives		Another World		Local/syndicated programming							NBC Nightly News with Tom Brokaw
NBC	Winter	NBC News at Sunrise		Today				Local/syndicated programming				Leeza		**Sunset Beach** (1/6)		Days of Our Lives		Another World		Local/syndicated programming							NBC Nightly News with Tom Brokaw
Fox	Fall	Local/syndicated programming			Bobby's World	Where on Earth Is Carmen Sandiego?	Local/syndicated programming	**Fox After Breakfast**		Local/syndicated programming										Eek! Stravaganza	The Adventures of Batman & Robin	**Big Bad Beetleborgs**	Power Rangers Zeo^{+}	Local/syndicated programming			
Fox	Winter	Local/syndicated programming			Bobby's World	Fox's Peter Pan & the Pirates	Local/syndicated programming	**Fox After Breakfast**		Local/syndicated programming										The Adventures of Batman & Robin	Spider-Man	**Big Bad Beetleborgs**	Power Rangers Zeo^{+}	Local/syndicated programming			
Fox	Spring	Local/syndicated programming			Spider-Man	The Adventures of Batman & Robin	Local/syndicated programming	**Fox After Breakfast**		Local/syndicated programming										Bobby's World	Various programs	**Big Bad Beetleborgs**	Power Rangers Zeo / **Power Rangers Turbo** / Mighty Morphin Power Rangers	Local/syndicated programming			
Fox	Summer	Local/syndicated programming			Bobby's World		Local/syndicated programming	**Fox After Breakfast**		Local/syndicated programming										The Adventures of Batman & Robin	Eek! Stravaganza	**Big Bad Beetleborgs**	Mighty Morphin Power Rangers (Mon.-Thu.); Power Rangers Turbo (Fri.)	Local/syndicated programming			
Fox	July	Local/syndicated programming			Bobby's World		Local/syndicated programming	**Fox After Breakfast**		Local/syndicated programming										The Adventures of Batman & Robin	Eek! Stravaganza	**Big Bad Beetleborgs**	**Round the Twist** (Mon.-Thu.); **Stickin' Around** (Fri.)	Local/syndicated programming			
Fox	August	Local/syndicated programming			Bobby's World		Local/syndicated programming	**The Vicki Lawrence Show**		Local/syndicated programming										The Adventures of Batman & Robin	Eek! Stravaganza	**Big Bad Beetleborgs**	**Round the Twist** (Mon.-Thu.); **Stickin' Around** (Fri.)	Local/syndicated programming			
The WB	Fall	Local and/or syndicated programming																				Bugs 'n' Daffy	Animaniacs	Local and/or syndicated programming			
The WB	November	Local and/or syndicated programming																				Bugs 'n' Daffy (Mon.-Thu.); Freakazoid! (Fri.)	Animaniacs (Mon.-Thu.); Freakazoid! (Fri.)	Local and/or syndicated programming			
The WB	February	Local and/or syndicated programming																				Bugs 'n' Daffy	Animaniacs	Local and/or syndicated programming			

Notes:

- ABC, NBC and CBS offered their early morning newscasts via a looping feed (usually running as late as 10:00 a.m. Pacific Time) to accommodate local scheduling in the westernmost contiguous time zones or for use a filler programming for stations that do not offer a local morning newscast; some stations without a morning newscast may air syndicated or time-lease programs instead of the full newscast loop.
- NBC allowed owned-and-operated and affiliated stations the preference of airing Another World and Days of Our Lives in reverse order from the network's recommended scheduling.
- Sunset Beach debuted on NBC on January 6, 1997, and was made available to affiliates at either noon/11:00 CT or 3:00/2:00 CT. Some NBC affiliates did not air Sunset Beach in the noon timeslot, opting to air local news and/or syndicated programming instead, and often placing the soap opera in a late morning or afternoon time slot.
- The City aired its last episode on ABC on March 28; abbreviated half-hour versions of classic episodes of All My Children, One Life to Live and General Hospital filled the timeslot in the interim, until Port Charles premiered in its place on June 1, 1997; The City and Port Charles was fed to affiliates at Noon/11:00 a.m. CT or 12:30 p.m./11:30 a.m. CT, depending on local scheduling preference.
- (+) Fox Kids temporarily aired Mighty Morphin Power Rangers reruns in the 4:30 p.m. ET slot for two non-consecutive weeks during the 1996–97 midseason (one in February and one in March).
- Fox Kids ran temporary stunt blocks of animated and live-action series in the 3:30 p.m. ET time slot during the spring of 1997, including:
  - Bobby's World (March 31–April 11)
  - Spider-Man (April 14–25)
  - Goosebumps (April 28–May 2)
  - Eerie, Indiana (May 5–9)
  - Life with Louie (May 12–16)
  - Casper (May 19–23)
- In July, Fox Kids replaced Power Rangers reruns at 4:30 p.m. ET with Round the Twist (Monday–Thursday) and Stickin' Around (Friday).

=== Saturday ===
Network		7:00 am	7:30 am	8:00 am	8:30 am	9:00 am	9:30 am	10:00 am	10:30 am	11:00 am	11:30 am	noon	12:30 pm	1:00 pm	1:30 pm	2:00 pm	2:30 pm	3:00 pm	3:30 pm	4:00 pm	4:30 pm	5:00 pm	5:30 pm	6:00 pm	6:30 pm
ABC	Fall	Local and/or syndicated programming		The New Adventures of Winnie the Pooh	**Brand Spanking New! Doug**	**The Mighty Ducks**	**Street Sharks**	The Bugs Bunny and Tweety Show / Schoolhouse Rock! (10:56 am)		**Bone Chillers**	**Gargoyles: The Goliath Chronicles**	**Flash Forward**	ABC Weekend Special	ABC Sports and/or local programming											
ABC	October	Local and/or syndicated programming		**Jungle Cubs**	**Brand Spanking New! Doug**	**The Mighty Ducks**	**Street Sharks**	The Bugs Bunny and Tweety Show / Schoolhouse Rock! (10:56 am)		**Bone Chillers**	**Gargoyles: The Goliath Chronicles**	**Flash Forward**	ABC Weekend Special	ABC Sports and/or local programming											
ABC	November	Local and/or syndicated programming		**Jungle Cubs**	**Brand Spanking New! Doug**	**Brand Spanking New! Doug**	**The Mighty Ducks**	The Bugs Bunny and Tweety Show / Schoolhouse Rock! (10:56 am)		**Bone Chillers**	**Gargoyles: The Goliath Chronicles**	**Flash Forward**	ABC Weekend Special	ABC Sports and/or local programming											
ABC	Winter	Local and/or syndicated programming		**Jungle Cubs**	**Brand Spanking New! Doug**	**Brand Spanking New! Doug**	**The Mighty Ducks**	The Bugs Bunny and Tweety Show / Schoolhouse Rock! (10:56 am)		**Bone Chillers**	**Gargoyles: The Goliath Chronicles**	The New Adventures of Winnie the Pooh	ABC Weekend Special	ABC Sports and/or local programming				ABC Sports programming						Local news	ABC World News Saturday
ABC	Spring	Local and/or syndicated programming		**Jungle Cubs**	**Brand Spanking New! Doug**	**Brand Spanking New! Doug**	**The Mighty Ducks**	The Bugs Bunny and Tweety Show / Schoolhouse Rock! (10:56 am)		**Nightmare Ned**	**DuckTales**	The New Adventures of Winnie the Pooh	ABC Weekend Special	ABC Sports and/or local programming				ABC Sports programming						Local news	ABC World News Saturday
CBS	Fall	Local and/or syndicated programming		The Twisted Tales of Felix the Cat	The Lion King's Timon & Pumbaa	The Mask: Animated Series	**Project G.e.e.K.e.R.**	Ace Ventura: Pet Detective	**Bailey Kipper's P.O.V.**	**Secrets of the Cryptkeeper's Haunted House**	Teenage Mutant Ninja Turtles	Beakman's World	CBS Storybreak	SEC on CBS											
CBS	November	Local and/or syndicated programming		The Mask: Animated Series	The Lion King's Timon & Pumbaa	The Mask: Animated Series	**Project G.e.e.K.e.R.**	Ace Ventura: Pet Detective	**Bailey Kipper's P.O.V.**	**Secrets of the Cryptkeeper's Haunted House**	Teenage Mutant Ninja Turtles	Beakman's World	CBS Storybreak	SEC on CBS											
CBS	Spring	Local and/or syndicated programming		The Twisted Tales of Felix the Cat	The Lion King's Timon & Pumbaa	The Mask: Animated Series	**Project G.e.e.K.e.R.**	Ace Ventura: Pet Detective	**Bailey Kipper's P.O.V.**	**Secrets of the Cryptkeeper's Haunted House**	Teenage Mutant Ninja Turtles	Beakman's World	CBS Storybreak	CBS Sports and/or local programming				CBS Sports programming						Local news	CBS Evening News
CBS	July	Local and/or syndicated programming		Beakman's World	The Lion King's Timon & Pumbaa	The Mask: Animated Series	**Project G.e.e.K.e.R.**	Ace Ventura: Pet Detective	**Bailey Kipper's P.O.V.**	**Secrets of the Cryptkeeper's Haunted House**	Teenage Mutant Ninja Turtles	The Twisted Tales of Felix the Cat	CBS Storybreak	CBS Sports and/or local programming				CBS Sports programming						Local news	CBS Evening News
NBC		Local and/or syndicated programming		Today				Saved by the Bell: The New Class	Hang Time	California Dreams	Saved by the Bell: The New Class	NBA Inside Stuff	NBC Sports and/or local programming					NBC Sports programming						Local news	NBC Nightly News
Fox	Fall	Local and/or syndicated programming		**C Bear and Jamal**	**Big Bad Beetleborgs**	The Spooktacular New Adventures of Casper	Spider-Man	Goosebumps	Life with Louie	X-Men	The Tick	Local and/or syndicated programming													
Fox	Winter	Local and/or syndicated programming		**C Bear and Jamal**	**Big Bad Beetleborgs**	Spider-Man	The Spooktacular New Adventures of Casper	Goosebumps	**Eerie, Indiana**	Life with Louie	X-Men	Local and/or syndicated programming													
Fox	May	Local and/or syndicated programming		**C Bear and Jamal**	The Spooktacular New Adventures of Casper	**Power Rangers Turbo**	Spider-Man	Goosebumps	**Eerie, Indiana**	Life with Louie	X-Men	Local and/or syndicated programming	In the Zone	Fox Sports and/or local programming										Local and/or syndicated programming	
Fox	Summer	Local and/or syndicated programming		**C Bear and Jamal**	Power Rangers Turbo	Spider-Man	The Spooktacular New Adventures of Casper	Goosebumps	**Eerie, Indiana**	Life with Louie	X-Men	Local and/or syndicated programming	In the Zone	Fox Sports and/or local programming										Local and/or syndicated programming	
The WB	Fall	Local and/or syndicated programming		The Sylvester & Tweety Mysteries	Animaniacs		Pinky and the Brain	**Superman: The Animated Series**	**Road Rovers**	Freakazoid!	Earthworm Jim	Local and/or syndicated programming													
The WB	October	Local and/or syndicated programming		Freakazoid!	Earthworm Jim	Superman: The Animated Series	Road Rovers	**Waynehead**	Pinky and the Brain	Animaniacs	The Sylvester & Tweety Mysteries	Local and/or syndicated programming													
The WB	November	Local and/or syndicated programming		**The Daffy Duck Show**	Animaniacs	Superman: The Animated Series	Road Rovers	**Waynehead**	Pinky and the Brain	Animaniacs	The Sylvester & Tweety Mysteries	Local and/or syndicated programming													

CBS note: The Twisted Tales of Felix the Cat and Beakman's World switched timeslots on July 12.

=== Sunday ===
Network		7:00 am	7:30 am	8:00 am	8:30 am	9:00 am	9:30 am	10:00 am	10:30 am	11:00 am	11:30 am	noon	12:30 pm	1:00 pm	1:30 pm	2:00 pm	2:30 pm	3:00 pm	3:30 pm	4:00 pm	4:30 pm	5:00 pm	5:30 pm	6:00 pm	6:30 pm
ABC		Local and/or syndicated programming		Good Morning America Sunday		This Week		Local and/or syndicated programming		ABC Sports and/or local programming														Local news	ABC World News Sunday
CBS		Local and/or syndicated programming				CBS News Sunday Morning			Face the Nation	Local and/or syndicated programming		CBS Sports and/or local programming												Local news	CBS Evening News
NBC	Fall	Local and/or syndicated programming		Today		Meet the Press		Local and/or syndicated programming				NFL on NBC													
NBC	Mid-winter	Local and/or syndicated programming		Today		Meet the Press		Local and/or syndicated programming				NBC Sports and/or local programming												Local news	NBC Nightly News
Fox	Fall	Local and/or syndicated programming				Fox News Sunday		Local and/or syndicated programming				Fox NFL Sunday		Fox NFL											
Fox	Mid-winter	Local and/or syndicated programming				Fox News Sunday		Local and/or syndicated programming				Fox Sports and/or local programming												Local and/or syndicated programming	
UPN		Local and/or syndicated programming				**Jumanji**	**The Mouse and the Monster**	**The Incredible Hulk**	**Bureau of Alien Detectors**	Local and/or syndicated programming															

== By network ==
=== ABC ===
Returning series:

- ABC Weekend Special
- ABC World News This Morning
- ABC World News Tonight with Peter Jennings
- All My Children
- The Bugs Bunny and Tweety Show
- Caryl & Marilyn: Real Friends
- The City
- General Hospital
- Good Morning America
- Good Morning America Sunday
- The New Adventures of Winnie the Pooh (reruns)
- One Life to Live
- Schoolhouse Rock! (reruns)
- This Week

New series:

- **Bone Chillers**
- **Brand Spanking New! Doug**
- **DuckTales**
- **Flash Forward**
- **Gargoyles: The Goliath Chronicles**
- **Jungle Cubs**
- **The Mighty Ducks**
- **Nightmare Ned**
- **Port Charles**
- **Street Sharks**
- **The View**

Not returning from 1995-96:

- Bump in the Night
- Dumb and Dumber
- Free Willy (reruns)
- Fudge
- George of the Jungle (reruns)
- Hypernauts
- Loving
- Mike and Maty
- The New Adventures of Madeline
- ReBoot
- What-a-Mess

=== CBS ===
Returning series:

- Ace Ventura: Pet Detective
- As the World Turns
- Beakman's World
- The Bold and the Beautiful
- CBS Evening News
- CBS Morning News
- CBS News Sunday Morning
- CBS Storybreak (reruns)
- Face the Nation
- Guiding Light
- The Mask: Animated Series
- The Price Is Right
- Teenage Mutant Ninja Turtles
- The Lion King's Timon & Pumbaa
- The Twisted Tales of Felix the Cat
- The Young and the Restless

New series:

- **Bailey Kipper's P.O.V.**
- **Project Geeker**
- **Secrets of the Cryptkeeper's Haunted House**

Not returning from 1995-96:

- The Adventures of Hyperman
- Aladdin
- Garfield and Friends
- Really Wild Animals
- Santo Bugito

=== Fox ===
Returning series:

- Fox Kids Network
  - The Adventures of Batman & Robin
  - Bobby's World
  - Eek! Stravaganza
  - Goosebumps
  - Life With Louie
  - Mighty Morphin Power Rangers (reruns)
  - Fox's Peter Pan & the Pirates (reruns)
  - Power Rangers Zeo
  - Spider-Man
  - The Spooktacular New Adventures of Casper
  - The Tick
  - Where on Earth Is Carmen Sandiego?
  - X-Men
- Fox News Sunday
- In the Zone

New series:

- **Fox After Breakfast**
- **The Vicki Lawrence Show**
- Fox Kids Network
  - **Big Bad Beetleborgs**
  - **C Bear and Jamal**
  - **Eerie, Indiana** (reruns)
  - **Power Rangers Turbo**
  - **Round the Twist**
  - **Stickin' Around**

Not returning from 1995-96:

- Fox Kids Network
  - Attack of the Killer Tomatoes (reruns)
  - The Fox Cubhouse
  - Masked Rider
  - Siegfried & Roy: Masters of the Impossible
  - Taz-Mania

=== NBC ===
Returning series:

- Another World
- Days of Our Lives
- Leeza
- Meet the Press
- NBC News at Sunrise
- NBC Nightly News
- Real Life with Jane Pauley
- Today with Katie Couric and Bryant Gumbel / Matt Lauer
- TNBC
  - California Dreams
  - Hang Time
  - NBA Inside Stuff
  - Saved by the Bell: The New Class

New series:

- **Sunset Beach**

Not returning from 1995-96:

- Saturday Today
- Sunday Today

=== UPN ===
New series:

- **Bureau of Alien Detectors**
- **The Incredible Hulk**
- **Jumanji**
- **The Mouse and the Monster**

Not returning from 1995-96:

- Space Strikers
- Teknoman

=== The WB ===
Returning series:

- Kids WB!
  - Animaniacs
  - Bugs 'n' Daffy
  - Earthworm Jim
  - Freakazoid!
  - Pinky and the Brain
  - The Sylvester & Tweety Mysteries

New series:

- Kids WB!
  - **The Daffy Duck Show**
  - **Road Rovers**
  - **Superman: The Animated Series**
  - **Waynehead**

== See also ==
- 1996-97 United States network television schedule (prime-time)
- 1996-97 United States network television schedule (late night)

== Sources ==
- https://web.archive.org/web/20071015122215/http://curtalliaume.com/abc_day.html
- https://web.archive.org/web/20071015122235/http://curtalliaume.com/cbs_day.html
- https://web.archive.org/web/20071012211242/http://curtalliaume.com/nbc_day.html
- https://kidsblockblog.wordpress.com/2012/10/25/fox-kids-weekday-lineups-1995-1997/
- https://www.cs.cmu.edu/~aarong/from-andrew/wb/kidswb-schedule.html
