= 1994–95 United States network television schedule (daytime) =

The following is the 1994–95 daytime network television schedule for the four of the six major English-language commercial broadcast networks in the United States. It covers the weekday and weekend daytime hours from September 1994 to August 1995.

== Legend ==
- Light yellow indicates talk shows.
- Green indicates soap operas.
- Pink indicates game shows.
- Gold indicates news and public affairs programming.
- Light teal indicates sporting events.
- White indicates local programming.
- Light purple indicates children's programming.
- Gray indicates encore programming (e.g., reruns of prime-time programming).
- White with red border indicates other programs not applicable to the above categorizations.
- New series are highlighted in **bold**.

== Schedule ==
- All times correspond to U.S. Eastern and Pacific Time scheduling (except for some live sports or events). Except where affiliates slot certain programs outside their network-dictated timeslots, subtract one hour for Central, Mountain, Alaska, and Hawaii-Aleutian times.
- Local schedules may differ, as affiliates have the option to pre-empt or delay network programs. Such scheduling may be limited to preemptions caused by local or national breaking news or weather coverage (which may force stations to tape delay certain programs in overnight timeslots or defer them to a co-operated station or digital subchannel in their regular timeslot) and any major sports events scheduled to air in a weekday timeslot (mainly during major holidays). Stations may air shows at other times at their preference.
- In 1995, a majority of stations that were affiliated with ABC, CBS, NBC, or were independents, had switched affiliations to Fox, with the 3 networks, or became independents, thus altering the network daytime schedule in several markets due to contractual obligations involving syndication programs or scheduling conflicts. However, some that switched affiliations did follow the schedule.

=== Monday–Friday ===
| Network | | 6:00 am | 6:30 am | 7:00 am | 7:30 am | 8:00 am | 8:30 am | 9:00 am | 9:30 am | 10:00 am | 10:30 am | 11:00 am | 11:30 am | noon | 12:30 pm | 1:00 pm | 1:30 pm | 2:00 pm | 2:30 pm | 3:00 pm | 3:30 pm | 4:00 pm | 4:30 pm | 5:00 pm | 5:30 pm | 6:00 pm | 6:30 pm |
|---|---|---|---|---|---|---|---|---|---|---|---|---|---|---|---|---|---|---|---|---|---|---|---|---|---|---|---|
| ABC | | ABC World News This Morning | | Good Morning America | | | | Local/syndicated programming | | | | Mike and Maty | | Local/syndicated programming | Loving | All My Children | | One Life to Live | | General Hospital | | Local/syndicated programming | | | | | ABC World News Tonight with Peter Jennings |
| CBS | | CBS Morning News | | CBS This Morning | | | | Local/syndicated programming | | | | The Price Is Right | | Local/syndicated programming | The Young and the Restless | | The Bold and the Beautiful | As the World Turns | | Guiding Light | | Local/syndicated programming | | | | | CBS Evening News |
| NBC | Fall | NBC News at Sunrise | | Today | | | | Local/syndicated programming | | Leeza | | Jane Whitney | | Local/syndicated programming | | Days of Our Lives | | Another World | | Local/syndicated programming | | | | | | | NBC Nightly News with Tom Brokaw |
| NBC | October | NBC News at Sunrise | | Today | | | | Local/syndicated programming | | Leeza | | **The Other Side** | | Local/syndicated programming | | Days of Our Lives | | Another World | | Local/syndicated programming | | | | | | | NBC Nightly News with Tom Brokaw |
| Fox | Fall | Local/syndicated programming | | | Bobby's World | Droopy, Master Detective | Local/syndicated programming | | | | | | | | | | | | | Tiny Toon Adventures (R) | Taz-Mania | Animaniacs | Mighty Morphin Power Rangers | Local/syndicated programming | | | |
| Fox | October | Local/syndicated programming | | | Bobby's World | **The Fox Cubhouse** | Local/syndicated programming | | | | | | | | | | | | | Tiny Toon Adventures (R) | Taz-Mania | Animaniacs | Mighty Morphin Power Rangers | Local/syndicated programming | | | |

=== Saturday ===
| Network | | 7:00 am | 7:30 am | 8:00 am | 8:30 am | 9:00 am | 9:30 am | 10:00 am | 10:30 am | 11:00 am | 11:30 am | noon | 12:30 pm | 1:00 pm | 1:30 pm | 2:00 pm | 2:30 pm | 3:00 pm | 3:30 pm | 4:00 pm | 4:30 pm | 5:00 pm | 5:30 pm | 6:00 pm | 6:30 pm |
|---|---|---|---|---|---|---|---|---|---|---|---|---|---|---|---|---|---|---|---|---|---|---|---|---|---|
| ABC | Fall | Local and/or syndicated programming | | Cro | Sonic the Hedgehog | **Free Willy** | **ReBoot** | **Bump in the Night** | Tales from the Cryptkeeper | The Bugs Bunny and Tweety Show / Schoolhouse Rock! (11:56AM) | | The Addams Family (R) | ABC Weekend Special | College Football on ABC | | | | | | | | | | | |
| ABC | December | Local and/or syndicated programming | | Sonic the Hedgehog | Free Willy | Tales from the Cryptkeeper | **ReBoot** | **Bump in the Night** | The Addams Family (R) | The Bugs Bunny and Tweety Show / Schoolhouse Rock! (11:56AM) | | Cro | ABC Weekend Special | ABC Sports and/or local programming | | | | | | | | | | Local news | ABC World News Saturday |
| ABC | January | Local and/or syndicated programming | | Sonic the Hedgehog | Free Willy | Tales from the Cryptkeeper | **ReBoot** | **Bump in the Night** | **Fudge** | The Bugs Bunny and Tweety Show / Schoolhouse Rock! (11:56AM) | | Cro | ABC Weekend Special | ABC Sports and/or local programming | | | | | | | | | | Local news | ABC World News Saturday |
| ABC | Summer | Local and/or syndicated programming | | Free Willy | Free Willy | Tales from the Cryptkeeper | **ReBoot** | **Bump in the Night** | **Fudge** | The Bugs Bunny and Tweety Show / Schoolhouse Rock! (11:56AM) | | Cro | ABC Weekend Special | ABC Sports and/or local programming | | | | | | | | | | Local news | ABC World News Saturday |
| CBS | Fall | Local and/or syndicated programming | | The Little Mermaid | **Beethoven** | **Aladdin** | **Skeleton Warriors** | **Wild C.A.T.s** | Teenage Mutant Ninja Turtles | Garfield and Friends | | Beakman's World | CBS Storybreak (R) | CBS Sports and/or local programming | | | | | | | | | | Local news | CBS Evening News |
| CBS | January | Local and/or syndicated programming | | The Little Mermaid | **Beethoven** | **Aladdin** | Teenage Mutant Ninja Turtles | **Wild C.A.T.s** | Skeleton Warriors | Garfield and Friends | | Beakman's World | CBS Storybreak (R) | CBS Sports and/or local programming | | | | | | | | | | Local news | CBS Evening News |
| CBS | February | Local and/or syndicated programming | | The Little Mermaid | **Beethoven** | **Aladdin** | Teenage Mutant Ninja Turtles | Garfield and Friends | Garfield and Friends | Wild C.A.T.s | Skeleton Warriors | Beakman's World | CBS Storybreak (R) | CBS Sports and/or local programming | | | | | | | | | | Local news | CBS Evening News |
| CBS | August | Local and/or syndicated programming | | The Little Mermaid | **Beethoven** | **Aladdin** | Teenage Mutant Ninja Turtles | **The Mask: Animated Series** | Garfield and Friends | Wild C.A.T.s | Skeleton Warriors | Beakman's World | CBS Storybreak (R) | CBS Sports and/or local programming | | | | | | | | | | Local news | CBS Evening News |
| NBC | | Local and/or syndicated programming | | Saturday Today | | | | Name Your Adventure | Saved by the Bell: The New Class | | California Dreams | NBA Inside Stuff | NBC Sports and/or local programming | | | | | NBC Sports programming | | | | | | Local news | NBC Nightly News |
| Fox | Fall | Local and/or syndicated programming | | Dog City | Mighty Morphin Power Rangers | Animaniacs | Eek! Stravaganza | The Adventures of Batman & Robin | Where on Earth Is Carmen Sandiego? | X-Men | **The Tick** | Local and/or syndicated programming | | | | | | | | | | | | | |
| Fox | October | Local and/or syndicated programming | | Dog City | Mighty Morphin Power Rangers | Animaniacs | Eek! Stravaganza | The Adventures of Batman & Robin | The Tick | X-Men | Where on Earth Is Carmen Sandiego? Specials | Local and/or syndicated programming | | | | | | | | | | | | | |
| Fox | February | Local and/or syndicated programming | | Mighty Morphin Power Rangers | Where on Earth Is Carmen Sandiego? | Animaniacs | Eek! Stravaganza | **Spider-Man** | The Tick | X-Men | The Adventures of Batman & Robin | Local and/or syndicated programming | | | | | | | | | | | | | |
| Fox | March | Local and/or syndicated programming | | Animaniacs | Mighty Morphin Power Rangers | Eek! Stravaganza | The Adventures of Batman & Robin | **Spider-Man** | The Tick | X-Men | Where on Earth Is Carmen Sandiego? | Local and/or syndicated programming | | | | | | | | | | | | | |
| Fox | June | Local and/or syndicated programming | | Animaniacs | Where on Earth Is Carmen Sandiego? | Mighty Morphin Power Rangers | Eek! Stravaganza | **Spider-Man** | The Tick | X-Men | The Adventures of Batman & Robin | Local and/or syndicated programming | | | | | | | | | | | | | |

Fox Kids Network note: In September, Where on Earth Is Carmen Sandiego? aired at 10:30AM and The Tick aired at 11:30AM.

=== Sunday ===
| Network | | 7:00 am | 7:30 am | 8:00 am | 8:30 am | 9:00 am | 9:30 am | 10:00 am | 10:30 am | 11:00 am | 11:30 am | noon | 12:30 pm | 1:00 pm | 1:30 pm | 2:00 pm | 2:30 pm | 3:00 pm | 3:30 pm | 4:00 pm | 4:30 pm | 5:00 pm | 5:30 pm | 6:00 pm | 6:30 pm |
|---|---|---|---|---|---|---|---|---|---|---|---|---|---|---|---|---|---|---|---|---|---|---|---|---|---|
| ABC | | Local and/or syndicated programming | | Good Morning America Sunday | | This Week with David Brinkley | | Local and/or syndicated programming | | ABC Sports and/or local programming | | | | | | | | | | | | | | Local news | ABC World News Sunday |
| CBS | | Local and/or syndicated programming | | | | CBS News Sunday Morning | | | Face the Nation | Local and/or syndicated programming | | CBS Sports and/or local programming | | | | | | | | | | | | Local news | CBS Evening News |
| NBC | Fall | Local and/or syndicated programming | | Sunday Today | | Meet the Press | | Local and/or syndicated programming | | | | NFL Live! | NFL on NBC | | | | | | | | | | | Local news | NBC Nightly News |
| NBC | Mid-winter | Local and/or syndicated programming | | Sunday Today | | Meet the Press | | Local and/or syndicated programming | | | | NBC Sports and/or local programming | | | | | | | | | | | | Local news | NBC Nightly News |
| Fox | Fall | Local and/or syndicated programming | | | | | | | | | | **Fox NFL Sunday** | | Fox NFL and sometimes another Fox Sports event and/or local programming | | | | | | | | | | | |
| Fox | Mid-winter | Local and/or syndicated programming | | | | | | | | | | Fox Sports and/or local programming | | | | | | | | | | | | Local and/or syndicated programming | |

== By network ==
=== ABC ===
Returning series:

- ABC Weekend Special
- ABC World News This Morning
- ABC World News Tonight with Peter Jennings
- The Addams Family (reruns)
- All My Children
- The Bugs Bunny and Tweety Show
- Cro
- General Hospital
- Good Morning America
- Good Morning America Sunday
- Loving
- Mike and Maty
- One Life to Live
- Schoolhouse Rock!
- Sonic the Hedgehog
- Tales from the Cryptkeeper
- This Week with David Brinkley

New series:

- **Bump in the Night**
- **Free Willy**
- **Fudge**
- **ReBoot**

Not returning from 1993-94:

- CityKids
- Home
- Wild West C.O.W.-Boys of Moo Mesa

=== CBS ===
Returning series:

- As the World Turns
- Beakman's World
- The Bold and the Beautiful
- CBS Evening News
- CBS Morning News
- CBS Storybreak (reruns)
- CBS News Sunday Morning
- CBS This Morning
- The Little Mermaid
- Face the Nation
- Garfield and Friends
- Guiding Light
- The Price Is Right
- Teenage Mutant Ninja Turtles
- The Young and the Restless

New series:

- **Aladdin**
- **Beethoven**
- **The Mask**
- **Skeleton Warriors**
- **Wild C.A.T.s**

Not returning from 1993-94:

- Cadillacs and Dinosaurs
- Conan and the Young Warriors
- All-New Dennis the Menace
- Marsupilami

=== Fox ===
Returning series:

- Fox Kids Network
  - The Adventures of Batman & Robin
  - Animaniacs
  - Bobby's World
  - Dog City
  - Droopy, Master Detective
  - Eek! Stravaganza
  - Mighty Morphin Power Rangers
  - Taz-Mania
  - Tiny Toon Adventures (reruns)
  - Where on Earth Is Carmen Sandiego?
  - X-Men

New series:

- Fox Kids Network
  - **The Fox Cubhouse**
  - **Spider-Man**
  - **The Tick**

Not returning from 1993-94:

- Fox Kids Network
  - Merrie Melodies Starring Bugs Bunny & Friends
  - The Terrible Thunderlizards
  - Thunderbirds USA
  - Tom & Jerry Kids

=== NBC ===
Returning series:

- Another World
- Days of Our Lives
- The Jane Whitney Show
- Leeza
- Meet the Press
- NBC News at Sunrise
- NBC Nightly News
- Saturday Today
- Sunday Today
- Today
- TNBC
  - California Dreams
  - Name Your Adventure
  - NBA Inside Stuff
  - Saved by the Bell: The New Class

New series:

- **The Other Side**

Not returning from 1993-94:

- Caesars Challenge
- Classic Concentration (reruns)
- TNBC
  - Brains and Brawn
  - Running the Halls

== See also ==
- 1994-95 United States network television schedule (prime-time)
- 1994-95 United States network television schedule (late night)

== Sources ==
- https://web.archive.org/web/20071015122215/http://curtalliaume.com/abc_day.html
- https://web.archive.org/web/20071015122235/http://curtalliaume.com/cbs_day.html
- https://web.archive.org/web/20071012211242/http://curtalliaume.com/nbc_day.html
