= Julie Moran =

American model and television presenter (born 1962)

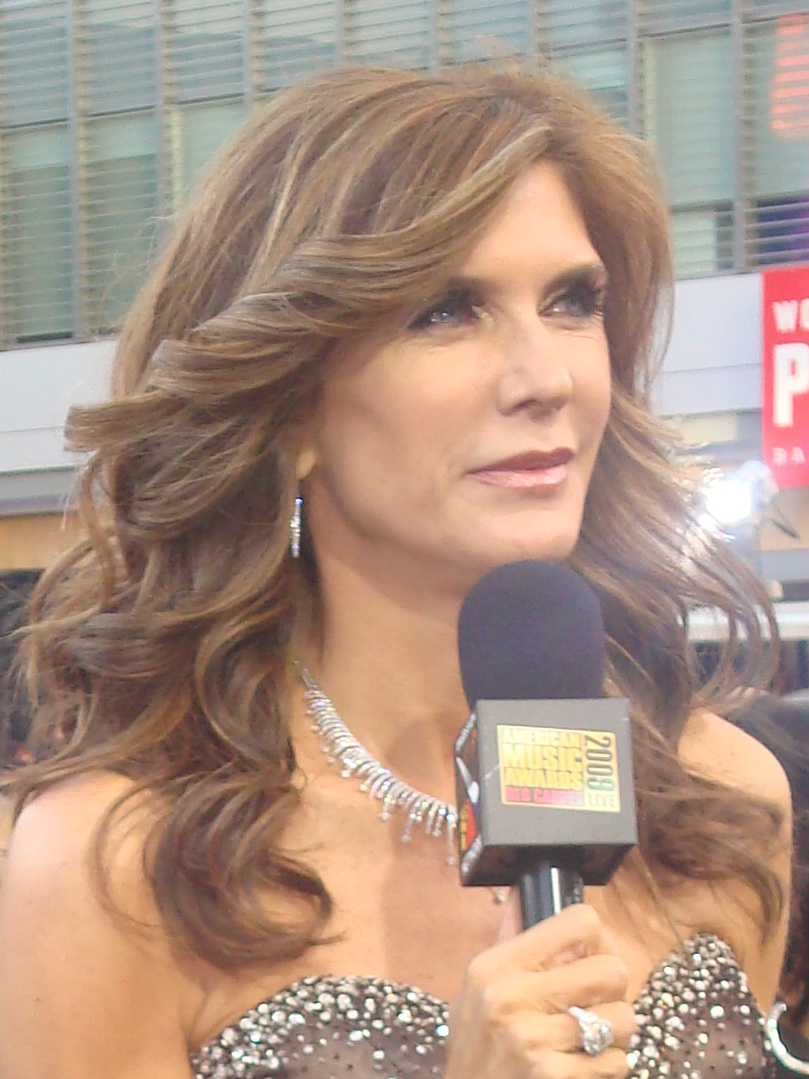
- Born: Julie Bryan; January 10, 1962 (age 64); Thomasville, Georgia, U.S.
- Occupations: TV anchor and host
- Years active: 1984–present
- Spouse: Rob Moran (m. 1987)
- Children: 2
- Parents: Paul Bryan, Jr.; Barbara Dixon

Julie Moran (née Bryan, born January 10, 1962) is an American journalist, television host, and sportscaster. She was the first female solo host for Wide World of Sports following in the footsteps of first woman co-anchor Becky Dixon. She was the weekend anchor and co-host for Entertainment Tonight from 1994 to 2001, and hosted the Academy Awards pre-show in 2001.

== Early life and education ==
Julie Bryan was born on January 10, 1962, to Paul and Barbara Bryan. Her father, Paul Bryan Jr. received two full athletic scholarships to the University of Georgia (UGA), playing baseball and basketball. While at UGA, he earned his master's degree in forestry in 1961. Paul was the owner of Metcalf Lumber Company in Thomasville, Georgia. Julie's mother, Barbara Dupree (née Dixon) also attended UGA and was named Homecoming Queen in 1960. She graduated summa cum laude with a bachelor's degree in 1961. Barbara was a high school English and Spanish teacher. Julie is the granddaughter of Sterling Dupree, the Auburn University sprinter who held the 100-meter dash record for 21 years. He was also a fullback for Auburn's football, later coaching football at Auburn, University of Georgia, and University of Florida.

Julie graduated high school from Brookwood Academy in 1980, where she was named "Miss Brookwood" during her junior year. She was also an All-State Basketball player for the Warriors and still holds the school's rebounding record to this day.

In 1980, Julie won the title of America's Junior Miss, which was televised nationally on CBS. Moran became one of the most well known Junior Miss participants of the decade, following Diane Sawyer the decade before her. She later hosted the competition in 1988, the program's last yearly event on a major television network.

In 1984, she graduated magna cum laude from the Henry W. Grady College of Journalism and Mass Communication at the University of Georgia.

== Career ==
=== Early work ===
In 1980, as America's Junior Miss, Moran earned an internship at CBS affiliate WCTV in Tallahassee, Florida. As an intern, she conducted office work, filing reports on the University of Georgia and Florida State University football games.

Moran's first job after graduating college in 1984, was in Los Angeles, California, as a reporter for ESPN's Sports Focus with Dr. J, Julius Erving.

From 1986 to 1987, she co-hosted Movietime with Greg Kinnear. Movietime was a movie trailer and entertainment news service that later evolved into E!.

In 1989, Moran moved to New York City to co-host NBC Sports' NBA Inside Stuff with Ahmad Rashad. In 1990, she eventually transitioned to ABC Sports Network, as a sideline reporter for college football with Brent Musburger and Dick Vermeil, and college basketball with Jim Valvano and Brent Musburger.

In 1990, she became the first woman to have an NBA Trading card created in her honor.

In 1992, Moran began anchoring the Emmy award-winning ABC's Wide World of Sports, following legendary sportscasters, Jim McKay and Frank Gifford. She was the show's fourth anchor ever, and the first woman to host the show solo (when Becky Dixon hosted in 1987–88, she did it alongside Frank Gifford).

=== Entertainment Tonight ===
On May 5, 1994, Moran began working for Entertainment Tonight (ET) as an anchor and correspondent in their New York City office. By 1995, she eventually transitioned to ET's Los Angeles headquarters and later succeeded Leeza Gibbons.

Shortly after joining Entertainment Tonight in 1994, Moran was named one of People Magazine's "50 Most Beautiful People".

While at Entertainment Tonight for 9 years, Moran interviewed several high-profile celebrities, including Oprah Winfrey and Julia Roberts. Moran hosted The Weekend Show and was the primary substitute anchor for Mary Hart. She also covered exclusive reports on major television and film sets. In 1996, she launched a signature weekly segment called, "ET One to One with Julie Moran".

In 1996, Moran was the head anchor from ET covering the 1996 Olympic Games in Atlanta, Georgia.

From 1994 to 2001, Moran was the primary substitute anchor, weekend anchor, and senior correspondent for ET.

=== Later years ===
After leaving Entertainment Tonight in 2001, Moran began spending time raising her daughters and working seasonally as a host for special events.

In 2001, she co-hosted the prestigious 73rd Academy Awards pre-show for ABC with Chris Connelly and Jim Moret. She also co-hosted the Grammy Awards pre-show for CBS in 1999 with Ellen DeGeneres.

In 1998, 1999, and 2000, Moran hosted the Miss Universe pageant, Miss USA pageant, and the Miss Teen USA pageant. In 2002, she co-hosted the Miss America pageant again with Wayne Brady.

Moran created, produced, and hosted The Insider's List with Julie Moran starting in 2004. The weekly series aired on the Fine Living Network.

She hosted the pre-show for the AFI Life Achievement Awards at the Kodak Theatre in Los Angeles, California in 2002, 2003, and 2004. The shows honorees were Tom Hanks, Robert De Niro, and Meryl Streep.

In 2012, Moran became a special correspondent for Access Hollywood.

She began hosting Lifetime's morning show, The Balancing Act in 2013.

== Personal life ==
On April 12, 1987, Julie Bryan married actor Rob Moran. The couple began dating in 1985 after being paired together on a Ford automotive commercial. Rob graduated from Emerson College in 1982 and is an actor and producer. He has had roles in Dumb and Dumber, There's Something About Mary, Kingpin, Hall Pass, Blended, Heaven is for Real, and the thriller You're Next, which won the Audience Award at The 2013 Toronto Film Festival.

In 1999, the couple welcomed their eldest daughter Maiya Dupree. In 2004, their second daughter Makayla-Amet was born.

She supports several philanthropic organizations, including Project ALS, Joyful Heart, The Georgia Campaign for Adolescent Power & Potential, and Agape.

In 2000, she became a spokesperson for the American Heart Association.

Media offices
Preceded by Frank Gifford	Wide World of Sports host 1994–1995	Succeeded by John Saunders
Preceded by First	NBA Inside Stuff co-host 1990–1991	Succeeded by Willow Bay
