= 1996–97 United States network television schedule (late night) =

These are the late night schedules for the four United States broadcast networks that offer programming during this time period, from September 1996 to August 1997. All times are Eastern or Pacific. Affiliates will fill non-network schedule with local, syndicated, or paid programming. Affiliates also have the option to preempt or delay network programming at their discretion.

In February 1997, Jay Leno took NBC's The Tonight Show on the road for a week, hosting his late-night television show at the MGM Grand Las Vegas. Meanwhile on CBS, David Letterman held a month-long celebration on The Late Show celebrating his 15 years in American late-night television.

== Legend ==
- Light blue indicates Local programming.
- Gray indicates encore programming.
- Yellow indicates late night talk or variety shows.
- Gold indicates network news programming.

== Schedule ==
=== Monday-Friday ===
Network		11:00 PM	11:35 PM	12:00 AM	12:30 AM	1:00 AM	1:30/1:35 AM	2:00 AM	2:30 AM	3:00 AM	3:30 AM	4:00 AM	4:30 AM	5:00 AM	5:30 AM
ABC	Fall	Local Programming	Nightline	ABC in Concert (Friday)	Local Programming			ABC World News Now			Local Programming				ABC World News This Morning
ABC	Winter	Local Programming	Nightline	Politically Incorrect with Bill Maher (12:07)	ABC in Concert (Friday)	Local Programming		ABC World News Now			Local Programming				ABC World News This Morning
CBS		Local Programming	Late Show with David Letterman		The Late Late Show with Tom Snyder		Local Programming	Up to the Minute		Local Programming					CBS Morning News
NBC		Local Programming	The Tonight Show with Jay Leno		Late Night with Conan O'Brien		Later (Monday-Thursday); Friday Night (Friday, 1:35-2:35)	NBC Nightside			Local Programming				NBC News at Sunrise

=== Saturday ===
Network	11:00 PM	11:30 PM	12:00 AM	12:30 AM	1:00 AM	1:30 AM	2:00 AM	2:30 AM	3:00 AM	3:30 AM	4:00 AM	4:30 AM	5:00 AM	5:30 AM
NBC	Local Programming	Saturday Night Live			Local Programming									
Fox	MADtv		Local Programming											

== By network ==
=== ABC ===
Returning series

- ABC in Concert
- ABC World News Now
- ABC World News This Morning
- Nightline

New series

- Politically Incorrect with Bill Maher (moved from Comedy Central)

=== CBS ===
Returning series

- CBS Morning News
- Late Night with David Letterman
- The Late Late Show with Tom Snyder
- Up to the Minute

=== Fox ===
Returning series

- MADtv

Not returning from 1995-96:

- Saturday Night Special

=== NBC ===
Returning series

- Friday Night
- Late Night with Conan O'Brien
- Later
- NBC News at Sunrise
- NBC Nightside
- Saturday Night Live
- The Tonight Show with Jay Leno
