= Kristen Ledlow =

American sports anchor (born 1988)

- Born: Kristen Melissa Ledlow; January 18, 1988 (age 38); Tallahassee, Florida, U.S.
- Education: Southeastern University (Florida)
- Occupations: NBA Inside Stuff host, NBATV, NBA on TNT
- Height: 1.75 m (5 ft 9 in)
- Spouse: Will Ramanakiwai (m. 2018)

Kristen Melissa Ledlow (born January 18, 1988) is an American sports anchor. She previously worked as a courtside reporter for the NBA on TNT from 2019 to 2023, and for NBA TV as the host of NBA Inside Stuff from 2013 to 2016. She has also served as a sports anchor for HLN and CNN.

== Early life ==
Ledlow attended Christian Community School, then North Florida Christian School, playing basketball and volleyball, while running track and cross country. She attended Southeastern University in Lakeland, Florida, majoring in broadcasting and communications, while minoring in business, and graduated in 2010. She was an All-American volleyball player with the school, and after games, she served as lead announcer for the men's basketball games.

During her senior year, Ledlow was crowned Miss Capital City USA, and also finished third in the state pageant.

== Broadcasting career ==
After graduating from college, Ledlow became an anchor at WTXL-TV, hosting the Good News Show, while writing for the Tallahassee Quarterback Club and working on radio for ESPN Tallahassee, later becoming a sideline reporter for Florida State Seminoles football games. Afterwards, she joined CBS Sports Radio as a cohost of The Opening Drive. On one occasion, she turned down an internship with ESPN to work in an athletic ministry. In 2013, Ledlow joined WZGC as a host, working alongside Jason Bailey and Randy Cross. She left the station on March 4, 2014.

In 2013, Ledlow was hired by NBA TV as a host for NBA Inside Stuff alongside former NBA player Grant Hill.

Ledlow participated in the 2014 NBA All-Star Weekend Celebrity Game for the East team, scoring twice in the first half.

== Personal life ==
She has been married to Will Ramanakiwai since 2018.
