= Wide World of Sports (American TV program) =

Television series

- Wide World of Sports logo
- Genre: Sports anthology series
- Created by: Edgar Scherick
- Presented by: Jim McKay; Becky Dixon; Frank Gifford; Julie Moran; Robin Roberts
- Country of origin: United States
- Original language: English
- No. of seasons: 37

Production
- Executive producer: Roone Arledge
- Camera setup: Multi-camera
- Running time: 90 minutes
- Production company: ABC Sports

Original release
- Network: ABC
- Release: April 29, 1961 – June 21, 1997

ABC's Wide World of Sports is an American sports anthology television program that aired on ABC from April 29, 1961, to June 21, 1997, primarily on Saturday afternoons. Hosted by Jim McKay, with a succession of co-hosts beginning in 1987, the title continued to be used for general sports programs on the network until 2006. In 2007, Wide World of Sports was named by Time on its list of the 100 best television programs of all time.

Weekend sports news updates on sister radio network ABC Sports Radio, operated by Cumulus Media Networks, continue to be branded under the similar title ABC's World of Sports. The program also lent its name to an athletic facility at Walt Disney World, the ESPN Wide World of Sports Complex, which was originally known as Disney's Wide World of Sports Complex from its opening in 1997 (one year after The Walt Disney Company acquired ABC and an 80% stake in ESPN) until 2010.

== History ==
=== Origins ===
Wide World of Sports was the creation of Edgar Scherick through his company, Sports Programs, Inc. After selling his company to ABC, he hired a young Roone Arledge to produce the show.

The series' April 29, 1961, debut telecast featured both the Penn and Drake Relays. Jim McKay (who hosted the program for most of its history) and Jesse Abramson, the track and field writer for the New York Herald Tribune, broadcast from Franklin Field with Bob Richards as the field reporter. Jim Simpson called the action from Drake Stadium with Bill Flemming working the field.

During its initial season in the spring and summer of 1961, Wide World of Sports was initially broadcast from 5:00 to 7:00 P.M. Eastern Time on Saturdays. Beginning in 1962, it was pushed to 5:00 to 6:30 P.M., and later to 4:30 to 6:00 P.M. Eastern Time to allow ABC affiliates in the Eastern and Central Time Zones to carry local early-evening newscasts.

=== Successful spin-offs ===
In 1961, Wide World of Sports covered a bowling event called the PBA National Invitational in which Roy Lown beat Pat Patterson. The broadcast was so successful that in 1962, ABC Sports began covering the Professional Bowlers Tour.

In 1964, Wide World of Sports covered the Oklahoma Rattlesnake Hunt championships; the following year, ABC premiered outdoor program The American Sportsman, which remained on the network for nearly 20 years.

In 1973, the Superstars was first televised as a segment on Wide World of Sports; the following year, the Superstars debuted as a weekly winter series that lasted for 10 years.

=== Athlete of the Year ===
In 1963, ABC Sports producers began selecting the Athlete of the Year. Its first winner was track and field star Jim Beatty for being the first to run a sub-4-minute mile indoors. Through the years, this award was won by such now legendary athletes of Muhammad Ali, Jim Ryun, Lance Armstrong, Mario Andretti, Dennis Conner, Wayne Gretzky, Carl Lewis and Tiger Woods. The award was discontinued in 2001.

=== The end of Wide World of Sports ===
In later years, with the rise of cable television offering more outlets for sports programming, Wide World of Sports lost many of the events that had been staples of the program for many years (many, although not all, of them ended up on ESPN, a sister network to ABC for most of its existence). Ultimately, its traditional anthology series was ended on June 21, 1997, after a 37-year run. The Wide World of Sports name remained in use afterward as an umbrella title for ABC's weekend sports programming, starting January 3, 1998.

In August 2006, ABC Sports came under the oversight of ESPN, under the relaunched banner name ESPN on ABC. The Wide World of Sports title continues to occasionally be revived for Saturday afternoon sports programming on ABC; it was used during the 140th Belmont Stakes as a tribute to Jim McKay following his death in June 2008, and in 2017 it was used for the revival of the Battle of the Network Stars with a remake of the show's opening sequence. Most of ABC's sports programming since Wide World of Sports ended as a program has been displaced from ABC and moved to ESPN; the cable network began producing its own anthology series on Saturday afternoons in 2010, ESPN Sports Saturday, which consists of documentaries originally featured on ESPN's E:60 and 30 for 30 programs, and a modified version of the ESPN interactive series SportsNation, titled Winners Bracket.

== Format ==
=== Sports featured on Wide World of Sports ===
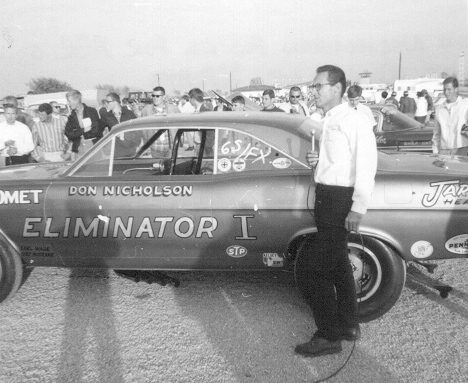
Drag racer Don Nicholson during a Wide World of Sports interview in 1966.

Wide World of Sports was intended to be a fill-in show for a single summer season, until the start of fall sports seasons, but became unexpectedly popular. The goal of the program was to showcase sports from around the globe that were seldom, if ever, broadcast on American television. It originally ran for two hours on Saturday afternoons, but was later reduced to 90 minutes.

Usually, Wide World featured two or three events per show. These included many types not previously seen on American television, such as drag racing, hurling, rodeo, curling, jai-alai, firefighter's competitions, wrist wrestling, powerlifting, surfing, logger sports, demolition derby, slow pitch softball, barrel jumping, and badminton. Auto racing was a staple of the program from its beginning; the first national coverage of NASCAR Grand National stock cars and NHRA drag racing was on Wide World of Sports, an edited broadcast of the Indianapolis 500 debuted in 1965 (previously only the time trials were televised), and ABC cameras would regularly go overseas for major Formula One Grands Prix and the 24 Hours of Le Mans.

Traditional Olympic sports such as figure skating, skiing, gymnastics and track and field competitions were also regular features of the show; for much of Wide World's life ABC was the American television home for the Olympics, and stars made during those games like Jean-Claude Killy, Olga Korbut, and Dorothy Hamill were popular draws. WWOS was also the home of most of boxing's major bouts until the 1980s when pay-per-view came to prominence; almost all of Muhammad Ali's fights were aired on ABC, with the star also appearing in regular interview segments alongside lead boxing voice Howard Cosell. Another memorable regular feature in the 1960s and 1970s was Mexican cliff diving. The lone national television broadcast of the Continental Football League was a Wide World of Sports broadcast of the 1966 championship game; ABC paid the league $500 for a rights fee, a minuscule sum by professional football standards.

==== Firsts ====
Wide World of Sports was the first American television program to air coverage of – among events – Wimbledon (1961), the Indianapolis 500 (highlights starting in 1961; a longer-form version from 1965 to 1970), the NCAA Men's Basketball Championship (1962), the Daytona 500 (1962), the U.S. Figure Skating Championships (1962), the first color broadcast of the Monaco Grand Prix (1967), the Little League World Series (1961), The Open Championship (1961), the X-Games (1995) and the Grey Cup (1962). They also featured Irish curling and the demolition derby from Islip, New York.

=== Introduction ===
The program's introductory sequence was accompanied by a stirring, brassy musical fanfare (composed by Charles Fox), set over a montage of sports clips and accompanying narration written by Stanley Ralph Ross and voiced by McKay:

Spanning the globe to bring you the constant variety of sport... the thrill of victory... and the agony of defeat... the human drama of athletic competition... This is ABC's Wide World of Sports!

==== "The thrill of victory ... and the agony of defeat" ====
The melodramatic introduction became a national catchphrase that is often heard to this day. While "the thrill of victory" had several symbols over the decades, Slovenian ski jumper Vinko Bogataj, whose dreadful misjump and crash during a competition on March 21, 1970, was featured from the early 1970s onward heard over the sentence "...and the agony of defeat." Bogataj became a hard-luck hero of sorts, and an affectionate icon for stunning failure. Previously, the footage played with that phrase was that of another ski jumper who made a long, almost successful jump, but whose skis lost vertical alignment shortly before landing, leading to a crash.

Later in the 1990s, an additional clip was added to the "agony of defeat" sequence after Bogataj's accident: footage of a crash by Alessandro Zampedri, Roberto Guerrero and Eliseo Salazar during the 1996 Indianapolis 500 showed a car flipping up into the catch fence. The "oh no!" commentary that accompanies it, however, is dubbed from commentary by Benny Parsons of Steve Grissom's crash in the 1997 Primestar 500 (part of the NASCAR Winston Cup series). Bogataj's mishap is also commemorated in Rich Hall's book Sniglets as "agonosis", which is defined as "the syndrome of tuning in on Wide World of Sports every weekend just to watch the skier rack himself."

== Announcers ==
=== Hosts ===
- Jim McKay (1961–1997)
- Becky Dixon (1987–1988)
- Frank Gifford (1987–1993)
- Julie Moran (1992–1994)
- John Saunders (1995–1996)
- Robin Roberts (1996–1997)

=== Event announcers ===
Play-by-play

- Tim Brant
- Howard Cosell
- Becky Dixon
- Chris Economaki
- Bill Flemming
- Terry Gannon
- Frank Gifford
- Curt Gowdy
- Keith Jackson
- Jim Lampley
- Jim McKay
- Al Michaels
- Julie Moran
- Brent Musburger
- Paul Page
- Bud Palmer
- Jerry Punch
- Robin Roberts
- John Saunders
- Chris Schenkel
- Al Trautwig
- Steve Zabriskie

Reporters

- Chris Economaki
- Bill Flemming
- Keith Jackson
- Jim Lampley
- David Letterman
- Stirling Moss
- Sam Posey
- Jerry Punch
- Jody Scheckter
- O. J. Simpson
- Lynn Swann
- Al Trautwig
- Lesley Visser
- Rodger Ward
- John Watson
- Jack Whitaker

Analysts

- Donnie Allison
- Chris Economaki
- Phil Hill
- Ned Jarrett
- Fred Lorenzen
- Mickey Mantle
- Cheryl Miller
- Don Meredith
- Stirling Moss
- Sam Posey
- Bill Russell
- Jackie Stewart
- Rodger Ward

== International versions ==
=== Canada ===
From September 19, 1964, until December 28, 1991, a Canadian version was aired by the CTV Television Network. Licensed by ABC, the CTV broadcast included a mix of content from the American show, and segments produced by CTV and its affiliates. The series ended in 1991, when the network launched the new CTV Sports Presents.

=== Australia ===
In Australia, the Nine Network produced its own version from 1981 to 1999 and from 2008 to 2016, Nine's Wide World of Sports, which has since become the all-encompassing brand for all of Nine's sport coverage. It was also originally a sports anthology series, but also featured professional sporting competitions. It, along with Nine's cricket coverage, also inspired a series of parodies, released as audio albums by Billy Birmingham, under the nom-de-plum of The Twelfth Man.

=== Mexico ===
A program partly inspired by the American version, known as DeporTV, El Ancho Mundo del Deporte (DeporTV, the Wide World of Sports) debuted on Canal 13, at the time the Mexican government's public television channel (which later became Imevisión) on January 6, 1974. The program continues to air on Imevisión's successor TV Azteca, becoming one of the longest-running programs in the country. It was hosted by José Ramón Fernández from its inception until 2006, and is currently hosted by Antonio Rosique, Luis García Postigo and Christian Martinolli. The program "El Ancho Mundo del Deporte" was aired in Monterrey Mexico in the state government owned Canal 28 from 1985 to 1991. This was possible in an exchange with Imevisión since the NFL national broadcast in Mexico for that national network was originated in Monterrey (Fernando Von Rossum Garza and Jose "Pepe" Espinoza). The hosts in the Monterrey version of "El Ancho Mundo del Deporte" were Javier Hector Gutierrez, Rubén Pizarro, Alejandro Campos, Martha Vigil and Carlos Gutierrez.

== See also ==
- ESPN8 The Ocho
- List of longest-running United States television series
