= Becky Dixon =

American television broadcaster

- Born: Rebecca Dixon; April 14, 1951 (age 74); Coffeyville, Kansas, US
- Education: University of Tulsa
- Occupation: Television broadcaster
- Years active: 1980 - present
- Spouse: Patrick Keegan
- Children: 2

Rebecca "Becky" Dixon (born April 14, 1951) is an American television broadcaster. She is best known as the first woman co-host of ABC’s Wide World of Sports, alongside Frank Gifford, from 1987 to 1988. Dixon is currently the president and owner of AyerPlay Productions in Tulsa, Oklahoma. She has also served as a news and sports anchor for KTUL-TV and host of the Oklahomans program which profiled celebrated Oklahomans.

== Early life ==
Dixon was born on April 14, 1951, in Coffeyville, Kansas. She grew up on her family’s ranch in Nowata County, Oklahoma.She attended The University of Tulsa in Tulsa, Oklahoma graduating in 1973 with a BA in elementary education and a concentration in journalism. Dixon was a member of the Chi Omega sorority.

== Career ==
Dixon began her career in broadcasting in 1980 as a news and sports anchor for KTUL-TV, the local ABC affiliate in Tulsa. With several years of sports reporting under her belt, Dixon was approached by Dennis Swanson, the president of ABC Sports, upon seeing a tape of her work at KTUL.

In 1986, Dixon became the first woman to anchor a network sports show when she became the co-host of ABC’s Wide World of Sports alongside Frank Gifford. In addition to her role as co-host, Dixon served as a reporter, covering major sporting events such as the Super Bowl, Winter Olympics, Triple Crown, and World Gymnastics Championships. Of her career Dixon said, “I really enjoyed the sidelines, because it included a bit of everything – feature reports, injuries, interviews… You were the eyes and ears on the field.”

She left network broadcasting in 1989 and briefly co-hosted the Dallas Cowboys’ Jerry Jones show before returning to Tulsa where she established broadcasting company, Dixon Productions through which she launched Oklahomans, a statewide broadcast that highlighted the achievements of Oklahomans. During the show’s 23-year run, Dixon interviewed numerous Oklahoma natives including Garth Brooks, Carrie Underwood, David L. Boren, T. Boone Pickens, Mickey Mantle and Ron Howard. Oklahomans ended its run in 2014.

In 1994, Dixon partnered with Ed Taylor, a pioneer in the cable and satellite communications profession at Taylor Communications. Dixon became president of Taylor Communications in 1997. In 2013, she purchased the company and renamed it AyerPlay Productions.

Dixon was one of seven honorees inducted into the Oklahoma Hall of Fame in 2016.

== Personal life ==
Dixon resides in Tulsa, Oklahoma, with her husband, Patrick Keegan. Dixon has two children. In 2016, Dixon received the Sadie Adwon Lifetime Achievement Award by the Association of Women in Communications.

Media offices
| Preceded by Jim McKay | ABC's Wide World of Sports host (with Frank Gifford); 1987–1988 | Succeeded by Frank Gifford (sole host) |
