= Willow Bay =

American model and journalist (born 1963)

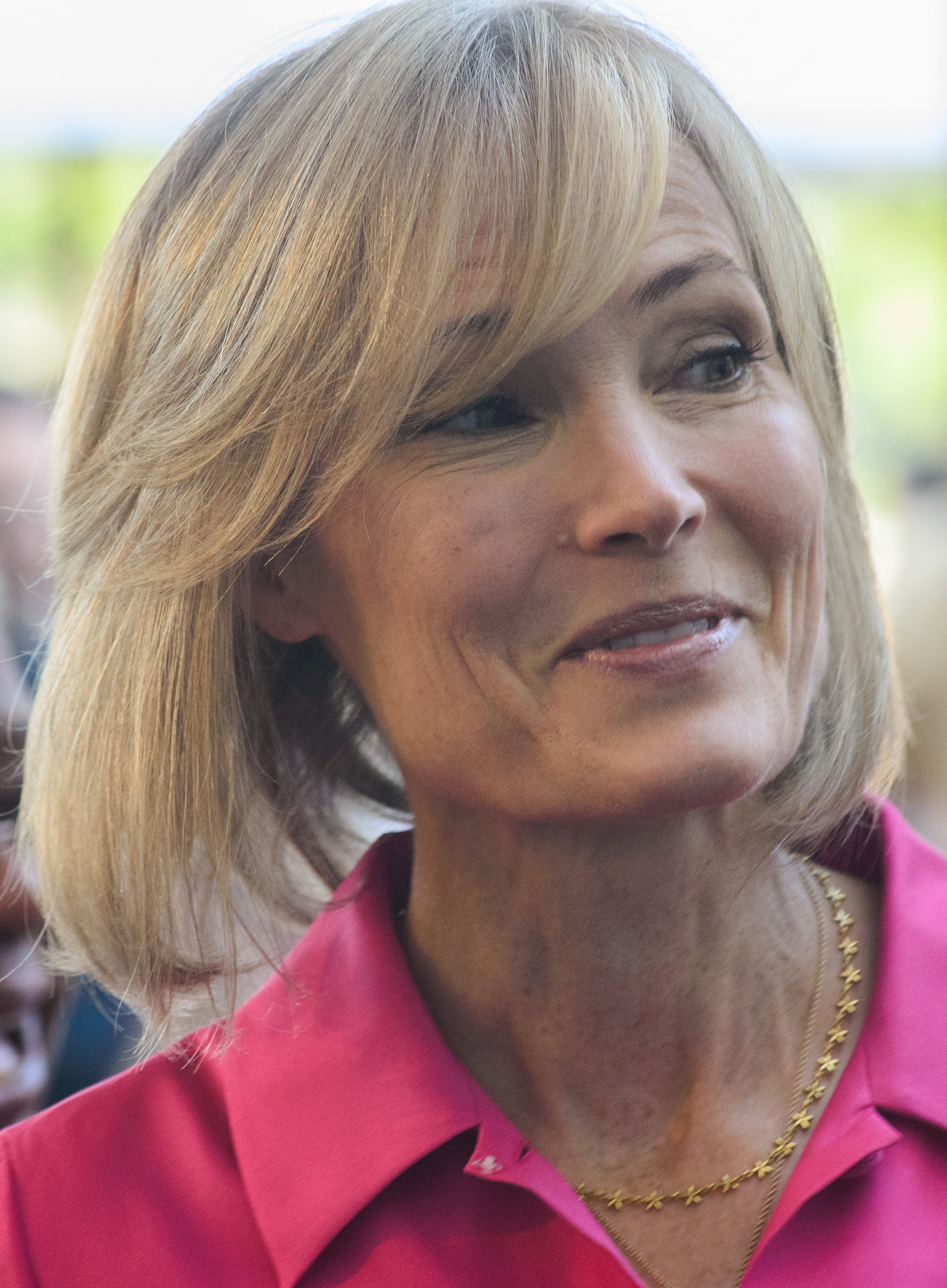
- Bay in 2014
- Born: Kristine Carlin Bay; December 28, 1963 (age 62); New York City, U.S.
- Education: University of Pennsylvania; New York University Stern School of Business
- Occupations: Academic dean; news anchor
- Spouse: Bob Iger (m. 1995)
- Children: 2

Willow Bay (born Kristine Carlin Bay; December 28, 1963) is an American television journalist, editor, author, and former model. In 2017, she became dean of the USC Annenberg School for Communication and Journalism having earlier served as director of USC Annenberg School of Journalism. She was previously a senior editor for the Huffington Post and a special correspondent for Bloomberg Television.

== Life and career ==
Bay was born in New York City, New York. She attended Dominican Academy, an all-girls Catholic school in New York, and graduated from Phillips Academy in Andover, Massachusetts. She attended the University of Pennsylvania as an undergraduate, and earned her MBA from the New York University Stern School of Business.

A former fashion model, she was represented by Ford Models. She was a spokesperson for Estée Lauder cosmetics from 1983 to 1989.

Bay served as a correspondent for NBC's Today Show. She was a co-anchor of ABC's Good Morning America Sunday for four years, and a correspondent for ABC's World News Saturday and World News Sunday. From 1991 to 1998, she was co-host with Ahmad Rashad of NBA Inside Stuff.

She was an anchor for CNN, hosting two primetime programs: CNN & Entertainment Weekly and CNN & Fortune, along with CNN's flagship financial news program, Moneyline. She was a freelance anchor and correspondent for MSNBC and NBC News in 2005 and 2006. She was the executive producer and host of Lifetime Television's Spotlight 25.

Bay is the author of a book titled Talking to Your Kids in Tough Times: How to Answer Your Child's Questions About the World We Live In (2003).

At the Huffington Post, Bay served as a senior editor based in Los Angeles. She has helped manage the expansion of non-political content and new verticals for the site. In collaboration with Yahoo! News and the Huffington Post, she interviewed Warren Buffett and President Bill Clinton for the Newsmaker series.

In July 2024, Bay and her husband, Bob Iger, agreed to take a majority stake in Angel City FC, a Los Angeles-based National Women's Soccer League (NWSL) team, with a $100 million investment. On completion of the transaction, Bay will serve and control the board of ACFC and represent the club on the NWSL's board of governors.

=== Personal life ===
Bay has two sons and two step-daughters with her husband, Bob Iger, the ex-chairman and ex-CEO of The Walt Disney Company, whom she married in 1995, following his divorce in 1994.
