= Rimba's Island =

- Country of origin: United States
- Original language: English

Production
- Production company: DIC Productions, L.P.

Original release
- Network: Fox Kids
- Release: June 27, 1994 – November 22, 1996

Rimba's Island is an American preschool children's live-action television series featuring anthropomorphic animal characters, played by humans in fursuits, living in a rainforest. It aired on Fox Kids as part of The Fox Cubhouse starting in 1994 and finished in 1996.

== Characters ==
- Rimba (played by Sissy and voiced by Suzanne Suter) is a gorilla and leader of the group.
- Bakari (played by Lena Armstrong and voiced by Jesse Corti) is a very hungry crocodile who loves sports.
- Ilana (played by Cheryl Yamaguchi and voiced by Janna Levenstein) is a giraffe who is a know-it-all.
- Ookii (played by Catherine Rahochik and voiced by Michael Lindsay) is a funny rhinoceros who is scared of his own shadow.
- Paquito (played by Jessica Bautista and voiced by Rosslynn Taylor) is a frisky lion who wants to be included in everything.
- Pria (played by J.T. Moye and voiced by Randi Calesa) is a clumsy elephant who exercises.

== Episodes and production ==
Co-executive producer Janice Sonski believed Rimba's Island to be the first series where all episodes were reviewed and approved of by the National Education Association and the National Parent-Teacher Association.
