= 1995–96 United States network television schedule (late night) =

These are the late night schedules for the four United States broadcast networks that offer programming during this time period, from September 1995 to August 1996. All times are Eastern or Pacific. Affiliates will fill non-network schedule with local, syndicated, or paid programming. Affiliates also have the option to preempt or delay network programming at their discretion.

On February 24, 1996, HBO aired the TV movie Late Shift, chronicling the behind-the-scene maneuvering that took place as both Jay Leno and David Letterman sought to replace Johnny Carson on The Tonight Show.

== Legend ==
- Light blue indicates Local programming.
- Gray indicates encore programming.
- Yellow indicates late night talk or variety shows.
- Gold indicates network news programming.

== Schedule ==
=== Monday-Friday ===
Network	11:00 PM	11:35 PM	12:00 AM	12:30 AM	1:00 AM	1:30/1:35 AM	2:00 AM	2:30 AM	3:00 AM	3:30 AM	4:00 AM	4:30 AM	5:00 AM	5:30 AM
ABC	Local Programming	Nightline	ABC in Concert (Friday)	Local Programming			ABC World News Now			Local Programming				ABC World News This Morning
CBS	Local Programming	Late Show with David Letterman		The Late Late Show with Tom Snyder		Local Programming	Up to the Minute		Local Programming					CBS Morning News
NBC	Local Programming	The Tonight Show with Jay Leno		Late Night with Conan O'Brien		Later (Monday-Thursday); Friday Night (Friday, 1:35-2:35)	NBC Nightside			Local Programming				NBC News at Sunrise

=== Saturday ===
Network		11:00 PM	11:30 PM	12:00 AM	12:30 AM	1:00 AM	1:30 AM	2:00 AM	2:30 AM	3:00 AM	3:30 AM	4:00 AM	4:30 AM	5:00 AM	5:30 AM
NBC		Local Programming	Saturday Night Live			Local Programming									
Fox	Fall	MADtv		Local Programming											
Fox	Spring	Saturday Night Special		Local Programming											
Fox	Summer	MADtv		Local Programming											

== By network ==
=== ABC ===
Returning series

- ABC in Concert
- ABC World News Now
- ABC World News This Morning
- Nightline

=== CBS ===
Returning series

- CBS Morning News
- Late Show with David Letterman
- The Late Late Show with Tom Snyder
- Up to the Minute

Not returning from 1994-95:

- Crimetime After Primetime
- The Kids in the Hall

=== Fox ===
New series

- MADtv
- Saturday Night Special

Not returning from 1994-95:

- Tales from the Crypt (reruns)

=== NBC ===
Returning series

- Friday Night
- Late Night with Conan O'Brien
- Later
- NBC News at Sunrise
- NBC Nightside
- Saturday Night Live
- The Tonight Show with Jay Leno
