= Siegfried & Roy: Masters of the Impossible =

- Genre: Action/Adventure
- Directed by: Ron Myrick
- Composer: Nathan Wang
- Country of origin: United States
- Original language: English
- No. of episodes: 4

Production
- Executive producers: Kenneth Feld; Andy Heyward; Robby London; Michael Maliani; Bernie Yuman
- Producers: Ron Myrick; Sean Roche
- Running time: 22 minutes
- Production company: DIC Productions, L.P.

Original release
- Network: Fox Kids
- Release: February 19 – February 22, 1996

Siegfried & Roy: Masters of the Impossible is an American animated television miniseries based on the Las Vegas magician act Siegfried & Roy. The performers, famous for their animal acts with white tigers and lions, were recast as action-adventure heroes in the mythical land of Sarmoti.

== Plot ==
Siegfried is an illusionist and Roy is an animal tamer traveling with a white tiger named Manticore. They meet in a kingdom where four demons have recently been released, three of them are personifications of sins and tempt members of the royal court to give in to their vices while the fourth is actually part of Manticore. Roy wishes to make Manticore whole and works with Siegfried to this end while they also try to save the kingdom from the other three demons, which they accomplish using their own brand of magic.

== Cast ==
- Jim Cummings as Greed, Avarice
- Tony Jay as Fairy Sprite Master
- Charlie Adler as Loki
- Jeff Bennett as Roy
- David Warner as Royal Adviser
- Dorian Harewood as Prince Malory
- Andrew Hawkes as Siegfried
- Barry Pearl as Rumpelstiltskin
- Neil Ross as King Midas
