= Saturday Night Special (TV series) =

American television series

- Directed by: Troy Miller; Keith Alcorn
- Starring: Jennifer Coolidge; Kathy Griffin; Laura Kightlinger; Bob Rubin; Warren Hutcherson; Heath Hyche; Carl LaBove
- Opening theme: "Low Rider"
- Country of origin: United States

Production
- Executive producer: Roseanne Barr
- Producer: Troy Miller

Original release
- Network: Fox
- Release: April 1 – May 18, 1996

Saturday Night Special is an American comedy-variety show that aired weekly Saturday nights on Fox.

== Overview ==
This show was a competitor to Saturday Night Live, with a similar format of comedy skits and musicians. It debuted on April 1, 1996, through May 18, 1996, airing in the same timeslot as the temporarily displaced MADtv.

The theme song to the show was War's "Low Rider". Two memorable skits involved Demi Moore (Roseanne) talking about her involvement in the movie "Striptease", and Zira (the chimpanzee woman from "Planet of the Apes") hosting a radio advice program. There was also a skit in which Lauren Hutton (Jennifer Coolidge) pleasured herself while interviewing Ice-T and Tupac Shakur.

== Cast ==
- Jennifer Coolidge .... Herself/Various Characters
- Kathy Griffin .... Herself/Various Characters
- Laura Kightlinger .... Herself/Various Characters
- Bob Rubin
- Warren Hutcherson
- Heath Hyche
- Carl LaBove (as C.D. LaBove)
- Carmen Electra (leader of the "Skin Tight Dancers" troupe on the show)

== Guest celebrities ==
- Yasmine Bleeth
- Sharon Stone
- Scott Wolf
- Melissa Etheridge
- Bush
- Ben Stiller
- Salt-N-Pepa
- Max Perlich
- Alice in Chains
- D'Angelo
- James Woods
- John Goodman
- Rodney Dangerfield
- Lynn Whitfield
- Coolio
- Garbage
- Rosie Perez
- Tupac Shakur
- Ice-T
- Fugees
- The Verve Pipe
- Laura Leighton
- Smothers Brothers
- Radiohead
- Jenny McCarthy
- Green Day
- Patti Smith
- Vendela
- Kiss

== Production credits ==
- Troy Miller and Keith Alcorn (Directors)
- Roseanne Barr (Executive Producer)
- Craig J. Nevius (co-producer)
- Troy Miller (Producer)
- Eric Beetner (Film Editor)
- Michele Spadaro (Set Decorator)
- Keith Alcorn and Nick Gibbons (Art Department)
- Paul Claerhout (Animator)
- Eric Mazer (Production Coordinator)
- Kenneth Paul Schoenfeld (Makeup Department Head)
- Gary M. Cambra (Music Composer)
- Taylor M. Uhler (Music Composer)
- Fox Network (Production Company)

== See also ==
- List of late night network TV programs
