= Real Life with Jane Pauley =

US television program

Real Life with Jane Pauley was a news magazine television program aired in the United States by NBC from 1990 to 1991. Real Life with Jane Pauley seemed to be presented as an answer to both critics and members of the general public to the frequently-repeated viewpoint that "television news never seems to show anything positive". The opening credits featured Jane Pauley on-location at Lawrence Hall of Science, then Boeddeker Park. Real Life focused on positive, human interest-type stories and occasional celebrity profiles. Jane Pauley also presented less uplifting but still-lightweight features as well, such as a feature focusing on how less than 20% of the people who owned VCRs at the time actually knew how to program them. Boyd Matson was also featured as a correspondent; his reports featured stories on out of the way places.

Real Life with Jane Pauley began as an hour-long program aired on Tuesday nights in the summer of 1990. It was put on hiatus in September of that year, returning in January 1991 as a mid-season replacement. At this time it was reduced to a half hour, the length it was to remain throughout the balance of its run, but was then ill-paired with NBC's Exposè, a newsmagazine which was fully opposite of Real Life, with a Hard Copy-esque tabloid focus. The last broadcast was on November 1, 1991.

Although the series was one of over a dozen attempts by NBC to launch a newsmagazine, Pauley and the network prevailed in 1992 with Dateline NBC.
