= NBA Inside Stuff =

Television series

- Presented by: Ahmad Rashad; Julie Moran; Willow Bay; Summer Sanders; Grant Hill; Kristen Ledlow
- Country of origin: United States
- Original language: English
- No. of seasons: Original series: 15; Revival series: 4
- No. of episodes: N/A (airs weekly)

Production
- Running time: 21–22 minutes (1990–2002); 23–24 minutes (2002–2006)

Original release
- Network: NBC (1990–2002); ABC (2002–2006)
- Release: October 27, 1990 – January 15, 2006
- Network: NBA TV
- Release: 2013 – 2018

Related
- NBA Access with Ahmad Rashad (2006–2011); Inside the NBA; Run It Back

NBA Inside Stuff is a television program featuring behind the scenes activities of NBA players. The program also includes features on fitness and fundamentals of basketball. The show has had three runs on three different networks: on NBC from 1990 to 2002, on ABC from 2002 to 2006, and on NBA TV from 2013 to 2018. From 1990 to 2006, it was hosted by Ahmad Rashad. His cohost changed over his time on the show; from 1990 to 1991 it was Julie Moran, from 1991 to 1998 it was Willow Bay, and from 1998 to 2006 it was Summer Sanders. In 2006, ABC retooled the show, changing its name to NBA Access with Ahmad Rashad, and shifted its time slot from Saturday mornings to Sunday afternoons.

The Inside Stuff format was revived from 2013 to 2018 on NBA TV, this time hosted by Grant Hill and Kristen Ledlow.

== Overview ==
NBA Inside Stuff served as a sort of recap and analysis show reviewing the week's previous games in the NBA, complete with top plays and special moments. The hosts would also interview top NBA players outside of game situations, often discussing issues relevant to them.

The show first aired on October 27, 1990, and ended on January 15, 2006. After a seven-year hiatus, NBA TV brought back Inside Stuff with new hosts and a new look. The revamped show began airing on November 2, 2013, on NBA TV and concluded in 2018.

=== Broadcast history ===
NBA Inside Stuff was usually the bridge program for NBC between TNBC (or, in its first two seasons, its Saturday morning cartoon lineup) and Saturday afternoon programming, usually sports. In the late 1990s, the program received some adaptation in order to meet the FCC's educational and informational requirements. In 2002, ABC took over the show from NBC after the latter network's contract with the NBA as the exclusive network rights-holder had expired.

When it moved to ABC in fall 2002, it aired at the tail end of the network's ABC Kids Saturday morning block, serving as a bridge between that and their afternoon sports programming (occasionally being moved to Sundays during college football season).

For its first two years there, the show suffered from a decline in viewership. When asked why he thought the show had gotten off track, Rashad had said, "because ABC locked us into a timeslot that didn’t fit the content, causing the show to suffer in the ratings." Many of the 18- to 34-year-old viewers who were drawn to the show on NBC throughout the 1990s failed to follow it to its new home on ABC. In fall 2004, as an effort to boost ratings, the show was moved to Sunday afternoons, still leading into sports programming.

NBA Inside Stuff last aired on January 15, 2006. It was then replaced with the similarly themed NBA Access with Ahmad Rashad (which ran on ABC until 2011). As its name implies, Rashad was the host. Reruns of Inside Stuff were moved at that time to NBA TV.

In 2013, NBA TV announced that after a seven-year hiatus, NBA Inside Stuff would return with Grant Hill and Kristen Ledlow as hosts, with Shaquille O'Neal as a sometimes fill-in host. The commercial for the then-newly resurrected NBA Inside Stuff later aired on NBA TV. This version ended in 2018.

=== Hosts ===
- Ahmad Rashad (1990–2004)
- Julie Moran (1990–1991)
- Willow Bay (1991–1998)
- Summer Sanders (1998–2004)
- Grant Hill (2013–2018)
- Kristen Ledlow (2013–2018)
- Shaquille O'Neal (fill-in host) (2013–2018)

== See also ==
- Run It Back – a show related to Inside Stuff, aired on Cartoon Network.
