= Bump in the Night (TV series) =

American stop-motion television series

- Created by: Ken Pontac; David Bleiman
- Directed by: Ken Pontac; David Bleiman; Ginny McSwain (voice)
- Voices of: Jim Cummings; Rob Paulsen; Gail Matthius
- Narrated by: Jim Cummings (uncredited); Gail Matthius (uncredited)
- Opening theme: Jim Latham
- Composer: Jim Latham
- Country of origin: United States
- Original language: English
- No. of seasons: 2
- No. of episodes: 27 (46 segments)

Production
- Executive producers: David Bleiman Ichioka; Ken Pontac; Patricia Rose Duignan
- Producer: Lope Yap Jr. (live action producer)
- Editor: Edie Ichioka
- Running time: 22 minutes
- Production companies: Danger Productions; Greengrass Productions

Original release
- Network: ABC
- Release: September 10, 1994 – December 2, 1995

Bump in the Night is an American stop-motion animated series by Danger Productions and Greengrass Productions. The show aired on ABC from 1994 to 1995. It was created and directed by Ken Pontac and David Bleiman.

== Synopsis ==
Mr. Bumpy is a small green, black-haired, purple-spotted monster with red, snail-like eyes and a bulbous nose living under the bed of a ten-year-old boy, where he eats dirty socks and dust bunnies as if they were delicacies. His best friends are Squishington, a small, anxious blue monster who lived in the bathroom's toilet cistern; and Molly Coddle, a Frankenstein's monster-like rag doll made of seven dolls belonging to the boy's sister who acts as the straight man to the others' crazy antics.

Other characters include Destructo, the boy's toy robot who sees himself as a cop and persecutes Mr. Bumpy for his actions. There is also the Closet Monster, who is made up of the boy's pile of clothes and chases after Mr. Bumpy.

== Structure ==
The show was traditionally split into two major parts per half-hour (occasionally dedicating a full half-hour per show, or sometimes splitting into three parts), and had a music video at the end of the episode, starring the three main characters and any minor characters involved in the episode. This musical montage would take clips from the episode itself and reiterate the life lessons learned in the episode.

== Cast ==
=== Main ===
- Jim Cummings – Mr. Bumpy, the Closet Monster, Destructo
- Rob Paulsen – Squishington, Sleemoth, Dad
- Gail Matthius – Miss Molly Coddle, Anti-Molly
- Mary McDonald Lewis – The Mom, the Cute Dolls
- Jeff Bennett – Gloog
- Janice Kawaye – Little Robot/Big Robot, Little Robot's Sister/Big Robot's Sister, Yellow Bunny
- Scott McAfee – The Boy
- Anndi McAfee – Little Sister
- Brad Garrett – Big Mike
- Jennifer Darling and Valery Pappas – The Cute Dolls

=== Additional cast ===
- Danny Mann – Phil Silverfish
- Elizabeth Daily – Germ Girl
- Gilbert Gottfried – Odiferous J. Stench
- April Winchell – Auntie Matta, The Princess, The Cute Dolls
- Cheech Marin – Juaquin Gusanito Sin Manos
- Cathy Moriarty – Destructette

Performing musicians for the music of the show: Wayne Boone (guitar), Kevin Konklin (guitar), Eric Ferry (drums), and Ray Brinker (drums).

== Episodes ==
=== Season 1 (1994) ===
No. overall	No. in season	Title	Original release date
1	1	"All You Need Is Glove" "In The Bowl of the Squishy Prince"	September 10, 1994
"All You Need Is Glove" — Bumpy battles an old glove for the perfect left-foot sock. Just as Bumpy is about to triumph in the battle, he realizes that the glove needs the sock for a more important reason. Note: Squishington and Molly Coddle do not appear in this episode.; "In The Bowl of the Squishy Prince" — Squishington is having a bad day and feels like a "worthless pile of goo". After hearing the story of The Frog Prince, Bumpy and Molly decide to make Squishington feel like a Prince for a day.; Karaoke Cafe: "Don't Try This at Home" — sung by Mr. Bumpy (Rock) Note: Squishington and Molly Coddle do not speak in this music video.
2	2	"Party Poopers"	September 17, 1994
"Party Poopers" (double length) — Bumpy escorts Molly to little sister's tea party and almost dies of boredom. Molly realizes that Bumpy's friendship is more important than a boring tea party and decides to add some life to the girl's party.; Karaoke Cafe: "School's Out" by Alice Cooper — sung by Mr. Bumpy (70s Rock)
3	3	"A Sneeze in Time" "Hocus Dopus"	September 24, 1994
"A Sneeze in Time" — Bumpy hurts Squishington's feelings and tries to go back in time to reverse what he said. Only after the third try, Bumpy realizes that it would have been easier just to say, "I'm sorry".; Karaoke Cafe: "The Things You Make Me Want to Do" — sung by Mr. Bumpy (Pop); "Hocus Dopus" — Squishington has a bad cold and Bumpy realizes that he cannot cure him with surgery so he decides to cheer him up with magic instead. Note: Molly Coddle does not appear in this episode.
4	4	"Adventures in Microbia" "Not a Peep!"	October 1, 1994
"Adventures In Microbia" — Bumpy and Squishington travel through a microscope to Microbia land to destroy Squishington's biggest enemy, bacteria. During their adventure, Squishington meets a female bacteria who is not quite like the rest of them. Note: Molly Coddle does not appear in this episode.; "Not a Peep!" — Destructo, the robot, is programmed by big brother to silence everyone when the lights go out at bedtime.; Karaoke Cafe: "Picking Up the Pieces When Your Whole World Falls Apart" — sung by Molly Coddle (Country). Note: Mr. Bumpy and Squishington do not speak in this music video.
5	5	"Penny for Your Thoughts" "Farewell 2 Arms"	October 8, 1994
"Penny For Your Thoughts" — When Bumpy discovers that he can earn a Penny for his thoughts, he has Squishington help him unclog his brain to make even more money.; "Farewell 2 Arms" — Molly is feeling powerless after little sister rips off her arm. Bumpy and Squishington try to put her back together again, with "better" parts and end up creating a monster instead.; Karaoke Cafe: "Socks – I Love Socks" — sung by Mr. Bumpy. Note: Squishington and Molly Coddle do not speak in this music video.
6	6	"I Dream of Silverfish" "Story Problems"	October 15, 1994
"I Dream of Silverfish" — Bumpy discovers a Silverfish in a bottle who claims to be a Genie, but the "Genie" is sick and is unable to grant any wishes. Bumpy and Squishington try to nurse him back to health, before they discover Mr. Silverfish's disguise. Note: Molly Coddle does not appear in this episode.; "Story Problems" — Bumpy devours older brother's homework and realizes that he will be severely punished if he is unable to turn it in. With the help of Squishington, Bumpy tries to redo the homework assignment by using their own obscure methods to find the answers. Note: Molly Coddle does not appear in this episode.; Karaoke Cafe: "Good Golly Miss Molly (You Sweet Comfort Doll)" — sung by Squishington (50s Rock). Note: Mr. Bumpy and Molly Coddle do not speak in this music video.
7	7	"Hide and Go Freak" "Better Homes & Garbage"	October 22, 1994
"Hide and Go Freak" — Bumpy and Squishington try to out-scare each other in a new game called "Hide and Go Freak". When Molly joins the game, one of them gets the worst scare.; "Better Homes & Garbage" — While Squishington's home is under construction Bumpy offers his to share his mess under the bed. Like the "Odd Couple", Squishington drives Bumpy absolutely batty with his cleanliness. Note: Molly Coddle does not appear in this episode.; Karaoke Cafe: "Bump in the Night Theme (alternate version)" — sung by Mr. Bumpy
8	8	"Made in Japan" "Dr. Coddle, M.D."	October 29, 1994
"Made in Japan" — Bumpy sends away his cereal box tops for a new Turbo-Totro-noid robot. Squishington soon discovers that the minuscule robot is not as tiny as everyone suspects.; "Dr. Coddle, M.D." — Molly studies to become a doctor, but Bumpy eats the Doctor's manual before she sees her first patient. After her first attempt to operate on Squishington, Molly realizes that being a comfort doll is much more rewarding.; Karaoke Cafe: "You Gotta Say You're Sorry..." — sung by Mr. Bumpy and Squishington (Blues) Note: Molly Coddle does not appear in this music video.
9	9	"Gum Crazy" "Baby Snail"	November 5, 1994
"Gum Crazy" — Squishington tells Bumpy that it takes seven years to digest all the gum that he has eaten from under the boy's bed. In an attempt to find the gum for re-use, Bumpy and Squishington venture inside Bumpy's body in search of the undigested bubble gum. Note: Molly Coddle does not appear in this episode.; "Baby Snail" — While Bumpy plays the Pirate and searches for treasures, he finds a snail trail. In hopes of discovering a treasure chest at the end of the trail, Bumpy's reward is something better, which is a baby snail.; Karaoke Cafe: "Why Do You Like Me?" — sung by Mr. Bumpy and Squishington (Ballad). Note: Molly Coddle does not appear in this music video.
10	10	"Not of This Boy's Room" "To Sleep Perchance to Burp"	November 12, 1994
"Not of This Boy's Room" — Bumpy is kidnapped by aliens and thinks their plan to invade the earth are exciting, but as Bumpy tries to join their invasion, he turns their spaceship upside-down and destroys all their plans.; "To Sleep Perchance to Burp" — The young boy is unable to sleep when he believes there to be a monster in the closet. Bumpy breaks his vow to never enter the closet, in order to destroy the Closet Monster once and for all.; Karaoke Cafe: "Gotta Have It" — rapped by Mr. Bumpy (Hip Hop)
11	11	"Danger: Unexploded Squishington" "Loss of Face"	November 19, 1994
"Danger: Unexploded Squishington" — Squishington ignores Bumpy's warning about eating in the dark. To both their surprise, Squishington has eaten more than just a pie. Note: Molly Coddle does not appear in this episode.; "Loss of Face" — Squishington is tired of his same old face, until he accidentally washes it off onto a face towel. While he is running around bumping into walls, looking for Bumpy, a silverfish bug steals the face towel and brings it to his family. Note: Molly Coddle does not appear in this episode.; Karaoke Cafe: "Find a New Neighborhood" — sung by Squishington (Rock). Note: Molly Coddle does not speak in this music video.
12	12	"Sock It to Me" "Comforting the Uncomfortable"	November 26, 1994
"Sock It to Me" — Bumpy indulges in more socks than his stomach can handle. Squishington, being the "best friend" that he is, helps Bumpy start a sock diet. Note: Molly Coddle does not appear in this episode.; "Comforting the Uncomfortable" — Molly is in a comforting mood. Not only does she want to comfort her friends, but her greatest attempt is to comfort the uncomfortable "Closet Monster".; Karaoke Cafe: "You Need a Hug" — rapped by Molly Coddle (Hip Hop)
13	13	"Baby Jail" "Night of the Living Bread"	December 3, 1994
"Baby Jail" — After swallowing a mouthful of baby formula, Bumpy is transformed into a baby and must join the little babies imprisoned in the play pen. Bumpy learns to appreciate a baby's lifestyle from his new point of view.; "Night of the Living Bread" — Bumpy plays Frankenstein and tries to toast his sandwich with electrical charges from a lightning storm. Instead, Bumpy brings a slice of bread to life which tries to devour Squishington. Note: Molly Coddle does not appear in this episode.; Karaoke Cafe: "Go Away and Don't Come Back" — sung by Squishington. Note: Molly Coddle does not speak in this music video.

=== Season 2 (1995) ===
No. overall	No. in season	Title	Original release date
14	1	"Neat and Clean" "Nothing But the Tooth"	September 9, 1995
"Neat and Clean" — Mr. Bumpy and his neat-freak pal Squishy take a trip to Microbia, where they sing about the virtues of cleanliness to a bunch of dirty, low down germs; it begins as "Adventures in Microbia", then breaks into song (Squishy, Molly, Destructo, Bumpy, Cute Dolls).; "Nothing But the Tooth" — Mr. Bumpy has toothache. To make it feel better, he applies thermite, in large quantities. This does not help either as the teeth turn ferocious and begin to eat everything that moves. Trying to escape, Bump, Squish and the rest of the gang get trapped on high ground, and must combine their smarts to survive.; Karaoke Cafe: "Picking Up the Pieces When Your Whole World Falls Apart"
15	2	"When the Music Starts"	September 16, 1995
"When the Music Starts" — Mr. Bumpy and Molly want Squishy to join them in their band, but stage shy Squishy declines. When the music starts, however, the Squish man's natural funk takes over and he becomes a Music Machine. Musical number for Squishington (Rock).; "Loss of Face"; Karaoke Cafe: "Go Away and Don't Come Back"
16	3	"Water Way to Go" "Cold Turkey"	September 23, 1995
"Water Way to Go" — When the plumber shuts off the water for the night, Squish becomes drier than the Sahara Desert. Only the medicine-show style singing of Mr. Bumpy and his Cute Doll Choir can induce the heavens to issue forth that precious liquid Squish craves to save his dried out hide. Musical number for Bumpy, Squishington, and the Cute Dolls (Soul). Note: Molly Coddle does not appear in this episode.; "Cold Turkey" — When Bumpy accidentally defrosts the freezer, he revives the Thanksgiving Day Turkey, which makes an escape into the house. In order for his Boy to have eats on the big day, Mr. Bumpy must track the gobbler down and get it back to its wintry abode. Note: Molly Coddle does not appear in this episode.; Karaoke Cafe: "I Live in the Porcelain" — sung by Squishington (Reggae). Note: Molly Coddle does not appear in this music video.
17	4	"Bump and Roll"	September 30, 1995
"Bump and Roll" — Mr. Bumpy, as a rock star extraordinaire, sets out on a World Tour around the house, flailing away on his over-amplified electric guitar, while his faithful sidekick and roadie, Squishington, carries his equipment and drives the limo. After listening to the horrendous din created by warty green monster, the Cute Dolls decide to put an end to their music. Note: Molly Coddle does not appear in this episode.; "Night of the Living Bread"; Karaoke Cafe: "Making Music Is Fun" — sung by Mr. Bumpy, Squishington, and Molly (Latin)
18	5	"Made in Japan II"	October 7, 1995
"Made in Japan"; "Made in Japan II" (sequel to "Made in Japan") — Squish's computer pen-pal, the Little Robot, must flee for her life when a recall is put into effect. Hiding out with the gang, the Little Robot is acclimated to Americanism and good clean fun by Mr. Bumpy. When an evil Turbo Totro-noid is sent after the Little Robot, they have to fight the unstoppable engine of destruction.; Karaoke Cafe: "What Goes Up Must Come Down" — sung by Mr. Bumpy and Albert Einstein (Hip Hop). Note: Squishington and Molly Coddle do not speak in this music video.
19	6	"Long Long Day" "Destructo's Flipside"	October 14, 1995
"Long Long Day" — After a particularly vigorous session of rough-housing, Mr. Bumpy, the Closet Monster and Destructo take five in the Karaoke Cafe to chill out after their long day.; "Destructo's Flipside" — When Bumpy puts Destructo's batteries in backwards, the big metal juggernaut of destruction becomes a cross between Alan Alda and Phil Donahue.; Karaoke Cafe: "I'm Bigger than You" — sung by Destructo and Mr. Bumpy (similar to "Iron Man" by Black Sabbath) Note: Squishington and Molly Coddle do not speak in this music video.
20	7	"Auntie Matta" "Bumpy the Untrappable"	October 21, 1995
"Auntie Matta" — Bumpy's great aunt Mata is unfrozen from her Alaskan glacier, but she considers the 20th century a bit alien for her. She visits her favorite relative Bump and proceeds to scare the pants off everyone in the house. In order to get moments peace, Bumpy and the gang must scare the scarer.; "Bumpy the Untrappable" — The Boy vows to trap the monster under his bed and Mr. Bumpy vows to be untrappable. A battle of wits ensues, with Squishington bearing the brunt and comedy of the competition. In the end, after much trashing, Bumpy remains untrappable, the Boy himself is trapped and good time is had by everyone but Squish. Note: Molly Coddle does not appear in this episode.; Karaoke Cafe: "I Was Right and You Were Wrong" — sung by Mr. Bumpy and Squishington (Polka). Note: Molly Coddle does not speak in this music video.
21	8	"Love Stinks" "Love's Labor Bumped"	October 28, 1995
"Love Stinks" — Bumpy discovers that Destructo has a soft spot for Molly Coddle. Using the knowledge in his usual selfish and morally questionable way, Bumpy dresses up to look like Molly and leads Destructo on a merry chase around the house, trashing the metal-head at every turn. As soon as Molly gets wind of this, she and Destructo team up for retaliation.; "Love's Labor Bumped" — When Molly is pulled into an overflowing trash can by a Giant Hairy Land Squid, she comes out smelling like anything but a rose, but this is all to the liking of an amorous Stink Bug, who plays Romeo to Molly's Juliet.; Karaoke Cafe: "Why Do You Like Me?"
22	9	"Not a Leg to Stand On"	November 4, 1995
"Not a Leg to Stand On" — Bumpy is accused of stealing Molly's feet and is on the run with nowehere to go. All hands are against him, except for the pal Squish, but when Squish acts as the Defense Attorney at Bumpy's trial, things go from bad to worse.; "Hide and Go Freak"; Karaoke Cafe: "You Gotta Say You're Sorry..."
23	10	"Comfort Schmumfort"	November 11, 1995
"Not of This Boy's Room"; "Comfort Schmumfort" — A brain-enhanced Sleemoth returns to Earth along with his sidekick alien Gloog. Their mission is to capture their hated foe, Mr. Bumpy. Ignoring comfort doll Molly, the aliens head back to their home planet with Bump and Squish in tow. Not one to be trifled with, Molly goes after the aliens.; Karaoke Cafe: "Comfort Schmumfort" — sung by Molly Coddle, with Mr. Bumpy and Squishington (Polka)
24	11	"It Came from the Closet"	November 18, 1995
"It Came from the Closet (And Wouldn't Leave)" — The Closet Monster decides to take up abode under the bed. Bumpy knows that if he stays home, he will die; if he leaves, he will be giving up his home. The only alternative is fighting against the Monster. Note: Squishington and Molly Coddle do not appear in this episode.; "All You Need Is Glove"; Karaoke Cafe: "Bump in the Night Theme (alternate version)"
25	12	"I Got Needs" "Beauty and the Bump"	November 25, 1995
"I Got Needs" — Marauding Vikings are on a mission of plunder throughout the house, sacking, pillaging, and generally taking everything that is not nailed down. Mr. Bumpy sings a song which shows him to be the greediest of them all, so the Vikings make the Bumpster their new leader.; "Beauty and the Bump" — A beautiful Princess Doll in a glass jar turns up in Little Sister's room. It looks like she wants to get out, or at least that is what the love-stricken Bumpy thinks. Dureing the escape, Bumpy gets hit on the head and wakes up in Fairytale land.; Karaoke Cafe: "It's Mine" — sung by Mr. Bumpy
26	13	"It Sang from Beyond the Stars" "Journey to the Center of the Lungfish"	December 2, 1995
"It Sang from Beyond the Stars" — Alien intruders Sleemoth and Gloog have a new plan to take over the Earth: they stage their own "musical invasion" (ala Beatles in the sixties) and create mindless hordes of screaming slaves. When Bumpy poses as a booking agent and sends them to the toughest gigs in town, the Earth is saved. Note: Molly Coddle does not speak in this episode.; "Journey to the Center of the Lungfish" — Bumpy, Squish and Molly are swallowed by the Boy's pet lungfish. Inside they find a strange old benign sailor and the Loch Ness Monster. The group teams up to find a way out.; Karaoke Cafe: "Find a New Neighborhood"
27	14	"Twas the Night Before Bumpy"	December 9, 1995
In this 64-minute special, Molly Coddle takes over as a pageant director while Mr. Bumpy and Squishington enter the North Pole.

== Production ==
The development of the series began as a series of ad bumpers for ABC's Saturday morning lineup in 1993, hence the title Bump in the Night and the character's naming of Mr. Bumpy. In 1996, DIC Entertainment, while still in partnership with the ABC network, purchased the show's rights, even though they were never involved in the show's production. Reruns of Bump in the Night were featured on Toon Disney from 1998 to 2001.

== Home media ==
On VHS, the series was released by Capital Cities/ABC Video Enterprises and later Anchor Bay Entertainment on many VHS volumes:

- Molly: Tales from the Toy Chest
- Squishington: Tales from the Tank
- Mr. Bumpy: Tales from Under the Bed
- The Hubbish About Rubbish
- Hocus-Pocus, Pranks and Play
- Monsters on a Mission
- Dreams and Dilemmas
- Night of the Living Bread
- Mr. Bumpy's Karaoke Cafe
- 'Twas The Night Before Bumpy (Christmas special, 63 minutes, originally split into three episodes)

In 2003, Sterling Entertainment released a VHS/DVD called "Night of the Living Bread", containing six segments. Three additional segments were included on DVD. In 2010, Shout! Factory released Bump In The Night: The Complete Series on DVD. In 2016, Mill Creek Entertainment re-released Bump in the Night – The Complete Series on DVD in Region 1.
