= The Fox Cubhouse =

Television series

- Created by: Donna Mitroff; Jay Rayvid
- Directed by: Stan Swan
- Composers: Richard Berg; Tish Rabe; Michael Moricz; Richard Kosinski
- Country of origin: United States

Production
- Producers: Donna Mitroff; Jay Rayvid
- Running time: 22 minutes
- Production companies: Fox Children's Network; WQED

Original release
- Network: Fox Kids
- Release: October 3, 1994 – 1996

The Fox Cubhouse is an American preschool children's television series that aired weekday mornings on Fox Kids from 1994 through 1996. It ran for 234 episodes within two seasons. The show was an anthology series comprising several children's series. Initially starting with only Jim Henson's Animal Show, Johnson and Friends, and Rimba's Island, a different series was shown every day of the week.

== Programs ==
- Jim Henson's Animal Show - 39 episodes, Jim Henson Productions (1994–1996) - broadcast on Mondays and Fridays
- Johnson and Friends - 78 episodes, Film Australia (US dub) (1994–1996) - broadcast on Tuesdays and Thursdays
- Rimba's Island - 52 episodes, DIC Productions, L.P. (1994–1996) - broadcast on Wednesdays
- Britt Allcroft's Magic Adventures of Mumfie - 13 episodes, The Britt Allcroft Company (1995–1996) broadcast on Tuesdays with Johnson and Friends
- Budgie the Little Helicopter - 26 episodes, Fred Wolf Films (1995–1996) - broadcast on Thursdays with Johnson and Friends

== Production history ==
In 1992, Jay Rayvid and Donna Mitroff of WQED in Pittsburgh (the PBS member station known for producing Mister Rogers' Neighborhood) entered into an agreement with Film Australia to attempt to get Johnson and Friends onto television in the United States, specifically PBS. Unfortunately, they were not able to secure funding from PBS to produce a pilot due to the sheer traffic and number of submissions, despite their interest. In 1994, though, FOX began to show interest in Johnson and Friends. At this stage, 26 episodes (the first two series) had been produced and the latter 26 episodes (series three) were in post-production - all 52 episodes were available to WQED for distribution. FOX Children's Network committed to Johnson and Friends, thus The Fox Cubhouse was created.

WQED and Fox teamed up and implemented Johnson and Friends, Rimba's Island, and Jim Henson's Animal Show into this concept. The latter two series were specifically produced for the Cubhouse, but were also shown independently in many other countries. In addition, the Fox Cubhouse itself was shot at WQED.

The series featured a woman named Rosie (played by Nancy Mura), who with several puppet animal characters, introduced and served as the exit for the programs within.

Johnson and Friends was heavily revised for the Cubhouse series, the voices were redubbed for the most part, but Peter Browne was retained as Alfred's voice actor; due to master recording issues, however, all of his dialogue had to be rerecorded. Several additional songs and music tracks were written by Chris Neal and his son Braedy, who had previously composed all of the music for the original version of Johnson and Friends, as FOX felt that some of the earlier episodes were "too quiet" and did not fit the atmosphere they wanted for the series. Instrumental versions of pre-existing Johnson songs were also used. As the series was broadcast as a segment rather than a standalone program, the credits were featured at the end of the Cubhouse itself, and each Johnson episode ended with the final chorus of "Toys, Toys, Wonderful Toys" from the Johnson album, re-recorded by the US cast. Minor cuts were also occasionally made, along with adjustments to John Patterson's scripts, by WQED executive Casey Brown, to remove Australian terminology and slang. These changes are generally frowned upon by many of the original Johnson and Cubhouse crew, as well as people who grew up with the series.

The Fox Cubhouse became a short-lived success, and FOX commissioned an additional season of 26 episodes of Johnson and Friends for the Cubhouse's second season. Series director Ian Munro maintained a level of creative control over the American version of the program and was involved with voice direction for this run of episodes. These episodes were also shown in Australia, dubbed by the original voice cast and marketed as the fourth series of the program, two years after production, in 1997. David Flick, who had provided the American voice of Diesel, was replaced by Doug Scroope, Diesel's original voice, and several episodes of the first season of Cubhouse were also revised with Doug Scroope as Diesel, this change was actually present in late reruns of the first season of Cubhouse. New episodes of Jim Henson's Animal Show and Rimba's Island were also present in this second season, as well as repeats of the old episodes. However, the second season was a complete revamp and the characters, setting, and the entire premise were changed. Only the programs within the Cubhouse remained the same. Two new shows, Magic Adventures of Mumfie and Budgie the Little Helicopter were also added to the series. While previous Cubhouse episodes featured two episodes of Johnson and Friends, the second season sometimes paired a single episode with an episode of Budgie the Little Helicopter or Magic Adventures of Mumfie (because all three programs had a running time of 10 minutes). Some episodes, however, still featured two Johnson episodes.

Shortly after the broadcast of the final second-season episodes in 1996, The Fox Cubhouse was taken off the air, and the American localisation has not been seen since. Many of the master tapes of the US version are thought to have been wiped, but several master copies are known to exist.

The Fox Cubhouse was also shown in the US overseas territory Guam on KTGM.

== Characters ==
=== Season one ===
- Rosie (Nancy Mura)
- Cammy the Fox (Melissa Polakovic)
- Silbert the Dinosaur (Don Kinney)
- Fogel the Bird (Dreux Priore)
- Mailvin the Mailbox (Bill Schiffbauer)

=== Season two ===
- Sunny (Ellaraino Edwards)
- Freddie the Fox (Wendy Polland)
- Bill the Sunflower

== List of episodes ==
=== Season one ===
- 101 - The Race (Jim Henson's Animal Show)
- 102 - Friends (No. 1) (Johnson and Friends)
- 103 - Fruit Punch (Rimba's Island)
- 104 - Together, We Can Do Anything (No. 1) (Johnson and Friends)
- 105 - Cammyflage (Jim Henson's Animal Show)
- 106 - The Letter (Jim Henson's Animal Show)
- 107 - Taking Turns (Johnson and Friends)
- 108 - Snoring (Rimba's Island)
- 109 - Big Trouble (Johnson and Friends)
- 110 - Let's Get Some Sleep (No. 1) (Jim Henson's Animal Show)
- 111 - We Are Animals Too (Jim Henson's Animal Show)
- 112 - I Need a Little Help (Johnson and Friends)
- 113 - Tea Party (Rimba's Island)
- 114 - Clean Up (Johnson and Friends)
- 115 - Cows (Jim Henson's Animal Show)
- 116 - Painting (Jim Henson's Animal Show)
- 117 - Home is Where You Live (Johnson and Friends)
- 118 - I'm Learning Every Day (Rimba's Island)
- 119 - Hurt Teddy (Johnson and Friends)
- 120 - The North Star (Jim Henson's Animal Show)
- 121 - Camping Trip (Jim Henson's Animal Show)
- 122 - Mailvin Raps (Johnson and Friends)
- 123 - Fogel's Music (Rimba's Island)
- 124 - Make Believe (No. 1) (Johnson and Friends)
- 125 - Hop, Swim, Fly (No. 1) (Jim Henson's Animal Show)
- 126 - We’re Different (No. 1) (Jim Henson's Animal Show)
- 127 - Sherlock Silbert (Johnson and Friends)
- 128 - Tears (Rimba's Island)
- 129 - The Band (Johnson and Friends)
- 130 - Gadzooky (Jim Henson's Animal Show)
- 131 - Yummy Food (Jim Henson's Animal Show)
- 132 - It's Your Birthday (Johnson and Friends)
- 133 - Kings and Queens (Rimba's Island)
- 134 - The Ghost (Johnson and Friends)
- 135 - Abra Can Cram (Jim Henson's Animal Show)
- 136 - Friends (No. 2) (Jim Henson's Animal Show)
- 137 - Castle (Johnson and Friends)
- 138 - Safety (Rimba's Island)
- 139 - Nature Scout (Johnson and Friends)
- 140 - Listen to the Animals (No. 1) (Jim Henson's Animal Show)
- 141 - So Sorry (Jim Henson's Animal Show)
- 142 - Make Believe (No. 2) (Johnson and Friends)
- 143 - Lost (Rimba's Island)
- 144 - Mail Order (Johnson and Friends)
- 145 - Home is the Place to Be (Jim Henson's Animal Show)
- 146 - Cock-a-Doodle-Doo (Jim Henson's Animal Show)
- 147 - We’re Different (No. 2) (Johnson and Friends)
- 148 - Checkers (Rimba's Island)
- 149 - Share, Share, Share (No. 1) (Johnson and Friends)
- 150 - The Seashell (Jim Henson's Animal Show)
- 151 - Yummy Food (No. 2) (Jim Henson's Animal Show)
- 152 - We Are All the Colors of the Rainbow (Johnson and Friends)
- 153 - Why? (Rimba's Island)
- 154 - Complicated (Johnson and Friends)
- 155 - Be Careful (Jim Henson's Animal Show)
- 156 - Twinkle, Twinkle (Jim Henson's Animal Show)
- 157 - Let's Get Some Sleep (No. 2) (Johnson and Friends)
- 158 - The King (Rimba's Island)
- 159 - Tuxedo (Johnson and Friends)
- 160 - Mail (Jim Henson's Animal Show)
- 161 - Listen to the Animals (No. 2) (Jim Henson's Animal Show)
- 162 - The Hop (Johnson and Friends)
- 163 - Hugs (Rimba's Island)
- 164 - Together, We Can Do Anything (No. 2) (Johnson and Friends)
- 165 - Colors (Jim Henson's Animal Show)
- 166 - Hop, Swim, Fly (No. 2) (Rimba's Island)
- 167 - Exit All (Rimba's Island)
- 168 - Three (Rimba's Island)
- 169 - Friends (No. 2) (Rimba's Island)
- 170 - Lunchtime (Rimba's Island)
- 171 - Bugs (Rimba's Island)
- 172 - The club (Rimba's Island)
- 173 - Share (Rimba's Island)
- 174 - Food (Rimba's Island)
- 175 - Silbert's Dinner (Rimba's Island)
- 176 - I Need a Little Help (No. 2) (Rimba's Island)
- 177 - Secret Plot (Rimba's Island)
- 178 - Alone (Rimba's Island)

=== Season two (incomplete) ===
- 201 - No Pouncing in the House
- 202 - Small Packages
- 203 - Go Fly a Kite
- 204 - A Worm in the Hand
- 205 - Fearless Freddie and the Fruit Bat
- 206 - Up a Tree
- 207 - Nor a Borrower Be
- 208 - Tummy Trouble
- 209 - Tongue in Cheek
- 210 - To Share or Not to Share
- 211 - Beat the Heat
- 212 - My Brilliant Disguise
- 213 - A Nice Piece of Fruit
- 214 - Waiting for Sunny
- 215 - Sssizzzling Sssnakes!
- 216 - Migration
- 217 - Crying Wolf/Being Good
- 218 - Hurricane Freddie
- 219 - Finishing What You Start
- 220 - Froggy Do, Froggy Be
- 221 - Where Rhinos Fear to Tread
- 222 - Silly Sharing
- 223 - A Fine Day for Croquet
- 224 - Eyes Are the Windows
- 225 - Spice of Life
- 226 - Dinosaur Tracks/Melissa's Dinosaur
- 227 - If it Quacks Like a Duck
- 228 - A Tree in the House
- 229 - Remembering
- 230 - A Tattle Tale
- 231 - Ferocious
- 232 - Masquerade/Charade
- 233 - The Big Win
- 234 - A Song for Babs
- 235 - The Groups We Live In
- 236 - A Letter a Day
- 237 - Good-Bye Dolly
- 238 - If I Were a Fish
- 239 - Beauty and the Beasts
- 240 - Playing and Creating
- 241 - A Cake for Freddie
- 242 - Waiting for a Friend
- 243 - Sleepy Dreamy
- 244 - Dessert in the Desert
- 245 - Hard to Wait
- 246 - A Tiki Tea for Three
- 247 - Iron Freddie
- 248 - Houses for Foxes
- 249 - The Baby-Sitters Club
- 250 - How I Love Ya’, Sunny
- 251 - Freddie's Mess
- 252 - Heads or Tails
- 253 - Playing Pretend
- 254 - Right and Left
- 255 - Try, Try and Try Again
- 256 - Freddie Needs a Nap
- 257 - Every Part's Important
- 258 - Food for Mel
- 259 - The Purple is Always Greener
- 260 - Share
- 261 - Getting Along
- 262 - Scaredy Cat
- 263 - Piles o’ Paper
- 264 - Rimba's Day
- 265 - Bill Needs a Vacation
- 266 - Imagine
- 267 - We Are Family
- 268 - Where's Bill?
- 269 - The Big Surprise/Finders Keepers
- 270 - Diesel's Taxi/The Train Conductor
- 271 - The Burning Bundt
- 272 - Runaway Rubadub
- 273 - Telephone
- 274 - Holey Pockets, Batman
- 275 - Be a Clown
- 276 - And the Leader is...
- 277 - Fracula
- 278 - The Big Scoop
- 279 - Rock and Roll Freddie
- 280 - Who's Afraid of the Big Bad Wolf?
- 281 - Life is Like an Ice Cream Bar
- 282 - The Balloonatic
- 283 - Sail Away
- 284 - The Swap
- 285 - Grape-Berry Picnic
- 286 - The Thinker
- 287 - Billy the Kid
- 288 - Cry Wolf
- 289 - Hot and Colder
- 290 - Chicken Pox
- 291 - Digging for the Truth
- 292 - The Tin Star
- 293 - Apple Pie
- 294 - Fore!
- 295 - Message in a Bottle
- 296 - Hypnotic
- 297 - Froudini
- 298 - Babaloo Bongos
- 299 - Moondance
- 2100 - Treasure Hunt
- 2101 - Bugs and Boats on the Bottom
- 2102 - I Found It
- 2103 - No Drum Roll, Please
- 2104 - Baby Blues
- 2105 - Mr. Pillow
- 2106 - Merry Christmas
- 2107 - Footnotes
- 2108 - Auld Lang Freddie
- 2109 - Garden Gifts
- 2110 - Freddie the Flop
- 2111 - I Can See Clearly
- 2112 - Start to Finish
- 2113 - The Secret
- 2114 - Birthday Party
- 2115 - Case of the Chopped Greens
- 2116 - Dental Appointment
- 2117 - Fun is Where the Fox is
- 2118 - Strong Man Freddie
- 2119 - Something in the Way He Moves
- 2120 - Superfox
- 2121 - The Actor's Life
- 2122 - All the Marbles
- 2123 - For Art's Sake
- 2124 - Behind the Fence
- 2125 - Our Friend, the Wind
- 2126 - The Big Ball
- 2127 - Polka Dot Elephants
- 2128 - All the Way to China
- 2129 - Lost Marbles
- 2130 - Talent Show
- 2131 - My Fine-Beaked Friends
- 2132 - Speak for Yourself, Ookii
- 2133 - Families
- 2134 - Showdown at the OK Cubhouse
- 2135 - Warning!
- 2136 - Luck
- 2137 - Home is Where the Hole is
- 2138 - The Lucky Penny
- 2139 - Where Unicorns Roam
- 2140 - Mine, All Mine!
- 2141 - My Darling Clementine
- 2142 - A Blue Ribbon Day

== Reception ==
Upon the show's debut, Jennifer Mangan of the Chicago Tribune said, "While Fox Cubhouse gets high marks, it comes up short when compared to [its] commercial-free [competition on PBS and TLC]. Commercial interruptions detract from the 'Cubhouse's' educational agenda."
