= Mike and Maty =

American television series

- Genre: Talk show
- Presented by: Michael Burger; Maty Monfort
- Country of origin: United States
- No. of episodes: 490

Production
- Running time: 60 minutes
- Production company: Valleycrest Productions

Original release
- Network: ABC
- Release: April 11, 1994 – June 7, 1996

Mike and Maty is a daytime talk show which aired on ABC from April 11, 1994, to June 7, 1996, replacing Home, a daytime informational talk show that aired on ABC from 1988 to 1994. Like Home, the program was often involuntarily placed in late night timeslots by many ABC affiliates due to the network's lack of success at the time against CBS and The Price Is Right, along with many ABC stations at the time programming local lifestyle and talk shows instead.

Hosted by Michael Burger and Maty Monfort, the series covered an array of subjects on each episode. Guests included celebrities and authors, as well as cooking, health, beauty and fitness experts. Some shows featured Michael Kearney as a special correspondent.

Mike and Maty was replaced by Caryl & Marilyn: Real Friends, a talk show hosted by the comedic duo known as The Mommies, which in turn was canceled after eleven months and replaced in 1997 by The View.
