= Leeza =

- Also known as: John & Leeza from Hollywood
- Genre: Talk show
- Presented by: Leeza Gibbons; John Tesh (1993–1994)
- Country of origin: United States
- No. of episodes: 1,270

Production
- Production locations: Paramount Studios; Hollywood, California
- Running time: approx. 44 min (without adverts)
- Production companies: Leeza Gibbons Enterprises (1994–2000); Paramount Domestic Television

Original release
- Network: NBC (1993–1999); First-run syndication (1999–2000)
- Release: June 14, 1993 – September 8, 2000

Leeza is an NBC and syndicated daytime television talk show. It premiered on June 14, 1993, as John & Leeza from Hollywood, hosted by John Tesh and Leeza Gibbons. Tesh left the show after seven months, and on January 17, 1994, the program was retitled Leeza, and Gibbons became the sole host remaining in that capacity throughout the remainder of its run. The show aired its final episodes on September 8, 2000.

Leeza received 27 Daytime Emmy Award nominations (including nominations for Outstanding Host and Best Show for every year the show has been on the air) and has won three Emmy awards. The show also received a Genesis Award for programs that revealed animal abuse, the Media Access Award for accurately portraying persons with disabilities and an award from the Alzheimer's Association for show programming.

== Production ==
=== Conception and development ===
John & Leeza from Hollywood logo

The original format centered on celebrity news and interviews, but once Tesh left the show, it became more of a traditional television talk show.

After its first season, the show reformatted into a single-issue talk show. To prepare for this new format, Gibbons watched shows such as The Jenny Jones Show and Maury.

It was taped at Paramount Studios on Melrose Avenue in Hollywood, California, and was produced by Gibbons' production company and Paramount Television. Gibbons was also a hands-on executive producer in addition to host of the show, involved in every aspect from selecting show topics to finding guests.

== Broadcast history ==
The show ran on NBC between 1993 and 1999, showing on other stations in markets where the local NBC affiliate pre-empted it in favor of other programming. On April 14, 1999, NBC announced major changes to its daytime schedule; Leeza was dropped by the network to make room for Later Today. The show aired its final episode on NBC on September 3, 1999, after which it continued for one additional season in syndication. In early 2000, Leeza was cancelled after eight seasons due to low ratings; the final episode aired in May of that year. Reruns of the show continued to air until September 8, 2000.

Leeza's time slot often varied, as some stations aired the show in the morning while others aired it in the late-afternoon.

The program was also shown in the United Kingdom, as part of the original daytime schedule on Channel 5.

== Reception ==
=== Awards and nominations ===
Awards and nominations
| Award | Year (Note: Indicates the year of ceremony) | Category | Nominee(s) | Result | Ref. |
|---|---|---|---|---|---|
| Daytime Emmy Awards | 1995 | Outstanding Talk Show | Leeza | Nominated | |
| Daytime Emmy Awards | 1996 | Outstanding Talk Show | Leeza | Nominated | |
| Genesis Awards | 1998 | Television Talk Show | "Pound Puppy Makeovers" | Won | |
| Genesis Awards | 2000 | Television Talk Show | "Pets Turned Predators" | Won | |
