= Dennis Haskins =

American actor (1950–2026)

- Haskins in 2018
- Born: Dennis Button Haskins IV; November 18, 1950; Chattanooga, Tennessee, U.S.
- Died: September 27, 2026 (aged 75); Burbank, California, U.S.
- Occupation: Actor
- Years active: 1979–2020
- Children: 1

Dennis Button Haskins IV (November 18, 1950 – September 27, 2026) was an American actor known for his role as Principal Richard Belding in the teen sitcom Saved by the Bell, which ran from 1989 to 1993 on NBC. He then went on to star in Saved by the Bell: The New Class, which aired from 1993 to 2000. He also portrayed the role as a regular in Good Morning, Miss Bliss.

== Early life ==
Dennis Haskins was born in Chattanooga, Tennessee, on November 18, 1950. He attended Our Lady of Perpetual Help, Notre Dame High School in Chattanooga, and the University of Tennessee at Chattanooga. He played basketball at UTC after failing to make the team at the University of Tennessee, and he was also a member of the cheerleading squad. Haskins belonged to the Kappa Sigma fraternity. He dropped out of UTC but returned in 2015 to complete his degree in theater and speech, receiving credit for his continued work in his major field. Before beginning his acting career, Haskins appeared as a contestant on the TV game show Scrabble.

== Career ==
=== Television and film ===
Before his role on Saved by the Bell, Haskins appeared on several episodes of The Dukes of Hazzard in different roles. In the pilot episode, he played a Boar's Nest patron whom Daisy thrashes after he attempts to grope her while she's working as a waitress.

Haskins, who auditioned seven times for the role of Mr. Belding, first appeared as the character in 1988's Good Morning, Miss Bliss on the Disney Channel. After a year, the show was retooled as Saved by the Bell on NBC, with Haskins being the only adult member of the regular cast. Known for the catchphrase "Hey, hey, hey, what is going on here?", he continued the role on the spinoff Saved by the Bell: The New Class until 2000. He had a brief cameo as himself in the 2006 film The Boys & Girls Guide to Getting Down.

As a guest on the March 4, 2010, episode of Late Night with Jimmy Fallon, Haskins said he was capable of bench pressing 150 pounds as a senior member of Notre Dame men's varsity basketball team.

He appeared in the 2014 film A Million Ways to Die in the West as a snake oil salesman at the fair.

On February 4, 2015, Haskins reunited with Mark-Paul Gosselaar, Elizabeth Berkley, Mario Lopez and Tiffani Thiessen on The Tonight Show Starring Jimmy Fallon, where they appeared in a Saved by the Bell sketch with Fallon.

=== Music and other media ===
On August 31, 2009, Haskins released his first music album, Karaoke with Your Favorite Principal Dennis. On the album, he sings songs ranging from "Piano Man" to "Mustang Sally", the latter being a duet with Hulk Hogan's daughter Brooke Hogan. The CD was recorded in the summer of 2009 at Mikron Studios in South Pittsburg, Tennessee, with Mike Headrick. Cody McCarver produced the project, and Mike Yarworth financed it. In 2010, Haskins appeared in the video for "See You in Shell" by experimental metalcore band Iwrestledabearonce, which parodied Saved by the Bell and films by John Hughes.

Haskins was also a fan of professional wrestling and WWE. He appeared in multiple episodes of Z! True Long Island Story, a YouTube series by WWE professional wrestler Zack Ryder. He was also friends with former Los Angeles Dodgers pitching coach Rick Honeycutt.

On July 14, 2016, Haskins performed on stage with the 1990s-themed band, Saved by the 90s, in Toledo, Ohio, at a Toledo Mud Hens minor league baseball game.

He appeared in the music video for DJ Lubel's "The Women of LA" along with other former stars of the '90s Jaleel White and Pauly Shore.

Haskins appeared in the music video for Dirty Heads' "Vacation", where he is seen in an empty high school lip‑syncing to the entire track.

He also appeared in the music video for Khalid's "Young Dumb & Broke", playing a principal making an end‑of‑year announcement over the school's intercom.

== Death ==
Haskins died from Parkinson's disease in Burbank, California, on September 27, 2026, at the age of 75. Reports noted he had been diagnosed with that disease eight years earlier.

Following his death, former Saved by the Bell cast members Mario Lopez, Tiffani Thiessen, Lark Voorhies, Elizabeth Berkley, and Leanna Creel shared memories and tributes of Haskins on social media. He was also remembered by his longtime agent, Jay Schachter, and his caretaker Kimberly Snow. Snow was a former bartender at Dimples, a karaoke bar in Burbank that Haskins frequented.

== Filmography ==
Year	Title	Role
1979–1985	The Dukes of Hazzard	Elmo Smith / Gate Guard (uncredited) / Charlie Watkins / Moss
1979–1983	Archie Bunker's Place	Workman
1983	Hardcastle and McCormick: "Rolling Thunder"	Cop #1
1986	Magnum, P.I.: "Autumn Warrior"	Del Haynes
1987	Good Morning, Miss Bliss	Mr. Richard Belding
1988	Hiroshima Maiden	Hal Latimer
1989–1993	Saved by the Bell	Principal Richard Belding
1990	The Image	Steven Fish
1991	Eyewitness to Murder	Dr. Baldwin
1992	Saved by the Bell: Hawaiian Style	Mr. Richard Belding
1993	Saved by the Bell: The College Years	Mr. Richard Belding (guest)
1993–2000	Saved by the Bell: The New Class	Principal Richard Belding
1994	Saved by the Bell: Wedding in Las Vegas	Mr. Richard Belding
1998	Figure It Out: Family Style	Himself (panelist)
1999	The Boy with the X-Ray Eyes	Boyd Russell
2001	The Practice	Psychiatrist
2001	18	Laura's Dad
2001	The West Wing: "Bartlet for America"	C.E.O. Donor #2
2001	Max Keeble's Big Move	Mr. Kohls
2002	The Stoneman	Dean Hendricks
2002	An Ordinary Killer	Ronald Smith
2003	Dismembered	
2003	Going Down	Uncle Frank
2003	Red Water	Captain Dale Landry
2003	Tangy Guacamole	Toss Honeycut
2003	7th Heaven: "Stand Up"	Traffic Officer
2004	An Ordinary Killer	Ronald Smith
2004	Dead End Road	Mr. Makepiece
2004	JAG	Airport Security S-1
2005	It's Always Sunny in Philadelphia	Coach Murray
2005	Wild Michigan	Sheriff Folgar
2005	The Treasure of Painted Forest	Sheriff Thomas
2006	The Boys & Girls Guide to Getting Down	Himself
2007	Revamped	Satanist #2
2007	Sweep the Leg	Pizza Store Owner / Dad
2008	Ratko: The Dictator's Son	Dean Sitlong
2008	Ocean of Pearls	Dr. Shultz
2008	Robot Chicken	Jigsaw / Mr. Belding / Judge
2008	Private High Musical	Mr. Johnson
2008	Stacy's Mom	Professor Wood
2008	Creative Differences	Tom
2008	The Legend of Awesomest Maximus	Father Jay
2009	Acting School Academy	Martin DeWitt
2010	Men of a Certain Age	Terry's Landlord
2010	"See You in Shell" (music video by iwrestledabearonce)	
2010	Neighborhood Watch	Principal Gibbous
2011–2013	Z! True Long Island Story	Himself / Mr. Belding
2012	Victorious	Mr. Belding
2012	Mad Men	Cool Whip Test Kitchen Scientist
2012	How I Met Your Mother	Judge #2
2013	The JBL and Cole Show	Himself
2014	A Million Ways to Die in the West	Snake Oil Salesman
2014	New Girl	Santa
2015	Up on the Wooftop	Santa Claus
2015	Hot in Cleveland	Reverend Bower
2015	The Tonight Show	Mr. Richard Belding
2017	Holly, Jingles and Clyde	Santa Claus
2018	Bennett's Song	Gpa Sam Bennett
2019	Abstruse	Senator Stevens
2019	Enigma	Bob Jenkins
2019	Clemency	Mr. Collins
2020	A Bennett Song Holiday	GPA Sam Bennett

== Awards ==
Haskins was honored with the University of Tennessee at Chattanooga's Distinguished Alumni Award in 2000 and has a regional high school academic decathlon named after him, The Dennis Haskins Open.
