= She Cried No =

1996 film by Bethany Rooney

- Print advertisement
- Genre: Drama
- Written by: Kathleen Rowell
- Directed by: Bethany Rooney
- Starring: Candace Cameron Bure; Mark-Paul Gosselaar; Jenna von Oÿ; Bess Armstrong
- Theme music composer: Lee Holdridge
- Country of origin: United States
- Original language: English language

Production
- Executive producer: Steve White
- Producers: Megan Callaway; Ira Marvin
- Cinematography: Isidore Mankofsky
- Editor: Janet Bartels-Vandagriff
- Running time: 98 minutes
- Production companies: ACI; Steve White Entertainment

Original release
- Network: NBC
- Release: September 23, 1996

She Cried No (also known as Freshman Fall) is a 1996 American made-for-television drama film directed by Bethany Rooney and starring Candace Cameron Bure and Mark-Paul Gosselaar, both teen idols at the time from their roles on Full House and Saved by the Bell respectively. The film premiered on NBC on September 23, 1996.

== Plot ==
Melissa Connell is a college freshman who is invited to a party by a guy, Scott Baker, with her roommates Jordan McCann and Kellie Salter. Scott is a member of the college's most popular fraternity (to which her brother, Michael, also belongs) who has a history of date-raping female students. She, Jordan and Kellie attend the party at Scott's frat. Scott immediately starts giving her alcohol, but she keeps saying no. He tricks her by telling her to take a Jell-O shot, which was made with alcohol, despite being labelled otherwise. After getting drunk, she notices Jordan, who has passed out, being carried upstairs by a guy and tells Scott she needs to check on her. He leads her upstairs to his room, then rapes her. Melissa manages to escape afterwards and flees from the frat house in tears.

The next day, an upset Melissa returns to college and bumps into Scott, who insists the sex was consensual. Melissa becomes depressed, ignoring her school work, estranging from her friends, not eating and not sleeping. Jordan starts dressing more seductive and spending time with random guys, eventually dropping out of college. One night, while having dinner with Michael and his girlfriend Holly Essex, Scott shows up. Melissa runs away, with Scott chasing after her. She freaks out and gets into a car accident. She is taken into the hospital, but is not severely injured. She admits to a doctor about what happened, and she realizes she had been raped. She later admits this to her mother Denise Connell, who wants to press charges. Michael and her father Edward discourage her from doing this, explaining it could ruin her future.

Prosecuting Scott proves to be difficult, because she does not have any evidence. She receives no support from her friends and fellow students either, who think she led him on and was asking for it. However, Melissa starts seeing "Scott Baker is a rapist" graffitied in lipstick on mirrors all over the campus and wonders who is doing it. When Scott starts to threaten her and his frat brothers start bullying her, she considers pulling back from prosecuting. However, fed up with being scared, she decides not to give up, but Scott manipulates the jury and is found not guilty. Devastated by the results, Melissa attempts to move on with her life, wanting to put the rape behind her. Michael is determined to help her and asks Leland, his frat brother who takes pictures and records video of all the parties, to look at pictures from that night. They find a photo of her holding her ripped shirt together and fleeing down the stairs. Afterwards, Michael gets into a fight with Scott for raping his sister and states he is leaving the fraternity.

Melissa starts receiving support from other students. Courtney approaches her, admitting that she was the one writing in lipstick and tells her she was raped by Scott too, but didn't want to believe it until Melissa came forward. At Michael's going away party, all of the fraternity members force him to drink excessively (possibly as retribution for sticking up for Melissa). Leland tries to stop them, but Scott shuts his protests down. Michael is dumped in front of his girlfriend’s house, severely blacked out and then hospitalized for alcohol poisoning, though he survives. This inspires Melissa to fight back and with Leland’s help (due to his guilt about Michael’s hospitalization), she starts to collect evidence against Scott and is successful in gaining video footage that shows his true nature. Despite Michael's protests, Melissa gives Scott one chance to come clean. When he doesn't take it, she publicizes the footage by airing it on TV, showing what kind of person he truly is. Afterwards, Scott becomes alienated, Kellie apologizes to Melissa for not being there for her, and Jordan finally shares her rape story with Melissa before telling her that she plans to reapply for the next semester.

As the film ends, Scott's fraternity house is being shut down, the fraternity's charter having been revoked for recording consumption of alcohol on their premises.

== Cast ==
- Candace Cameron Bure as Melissa Connell
- Mark-Paul Gosselaar as Scott Baker
- Lawrence Pressman as Edward Connell
- Bess Armstrong as Denise Connell
- Jenna von Oÿ as Jordan McCann
- Brandon Douglas as Michael Connell
- Nikki Cox as Kellie Salter
- Ray Baker as Mark Baker
- Hillary Danner as Holly Essex
- Kristoffer Ryan Winters as Leland
- Jennifer Greenhut as Courtney

== Critical reception ==
Todd Everett of Variety wrote, "While commendably avoiding hysteria, Kathleen Rowell's script sometimes edges into tedium, and the climactic scene is pretty unbelievable. Best audience should be high-schoolers and their parents."
