= List of Saved by the Bell characters =

The American television sitcom Saved by the Bell, that aired on NBC from 1989 to 1993, follows a group of six high school students and their principal, Mr. Belding.

== Cast timeline ==
Main cast (Opening credits)
Recurring guest star (Guest starring for 4+ episodes)
Guest star (Guest starring for 1–3 episodes)

Character	Actor	Good Morning, Miss Bliss		Saved by the Bell							Saved by the Bell: The New Class							Saved by the Bell (2020)	
Character	Actor	Pilot	1 (Note: Aired in syndication under the title Saved by the Bell: The Junior High Years.)	1	2	3	4	Hawaiian Style	The College Years	Wedding in Las Vegas	1	2	3	4	5	6	7	1	2
Miss Carrie Bliss	Hayley Mills	Main	Main																
Charlie Davis	Charles Siebert	Main																	
Miss Tina Paladrino	Maria O'Brien	Main																	
Miss Tina Paladrino	Joan Ryan		Main																
Lonnie Maple	Julie Ronnie	Main																	
Mr. Richard Belding	Oliver Clark	Main																	
Mr. Richard Belding	Dennis Haskins		Main	Main	Main	Main	Main	Main	Guest	Main	Main	Main	Main	Main	Main	Main	Main		
Mikey Gonzalez	Max Battimo		Main																
Samuel "Screech" Powers	Dustin Diamond		Main	Main	Main	Main	Main	Main	Main	Main		Main	Main	Main	Main	Main	Main		
Zack Morris	Mark-Paul Gosselaar		Main	Main	Main	Main	Main	Main	Main	Main		Guest						Guest	Recurring
Nikki Coleman	Heather Hopper		Main																
Lisa Turtle	Lark Voorhies		Main	Main	Main	Main	Main	Main	Guest	Main		Guest						Guest	Guest
Mylo Williams	T.K. Carter		Main																
Kelly Kapowski	Tiffani Thiessen			Main (Note: Thiessen and Berkley departed the show before NBC ordered additional episodes for season 4. They appear in the opening credits for only half of season 4's episodes, alternating with their replacement, Tori, played by Creel.)	Main	Main	Main	Main	Main	Main								Guest	Recurring
A.C. Slater	Mario Lopez			Main	Main	Main	Main	Main	Main	Main		Guest		Guest				Main	Main
Jessie Spano	Elizabeth Berkley			Main	Main	Main	Main	Main		Guest								Main	Main
Max	Ed Alonzo			Main	Guest (Note: Some season 1 episodes were held off and aired during season 2 and 4, with Alonzo returning the credits for those episodes only.)													Guest	Guest
Tori Scott	Leanna Creel						Main												
Andrea Larson	Rena Sofer							Main											
Brian Hanson	Dan Gauthier							Main											
Leslie Burke	Anne Tremko								Main										
Alex Tabor	Kiersten Warren								Main	Guest									
Mike Rogers	Bob Golic								Main	Guest									
Carla	Liz Vassey									Main									
Kurt Martin	Spencer Rochfort									Main									
Melanie Morris	Melody Rogers					Guest				Main									
Derek Morris	John Sanderford				Guest		Guest			Main									
Scott Erickson	Robert Sutherland Telfer										Main								
Tommy De Luca	Jonathan Angel										Main	Main	Main						
Barton "Weasel" Wyzell	Isaac Lidsky										Main								
Lindsay Warner	Natalia Cigliuti										Main	Main	Main						
Megan Jones	Bianca Lawson										Main	Main							
Vicki Needleman	Bonnie Russavage										Main								
Brian Keller	Christian Oliver											Main							
Rachel Meyers	Sarah Lancaster										Guest	Main	Main	Main					
Bobby Wilson	Spankee Rogers											Main							
Ryan Parker	Richard Lee Jackson												Main	Main	Main				
R.J. Collins	Salim Grant												Main						
Maria Lopez	Samantha Becker												Main	Main	Main	Main	Main		
Nicky Farina	Ben Gould													Main	Main	Main	Main		
Eric Little	Anthony Harrell													Main	Main	Main	Main		
Katie Peterson	Lindsey McKeon													Main	Main	Main	Main		
Liz Miller	Ashley Lyn Cafagna														Main	Main	Main		
Tony Dillon	Tom Wade Huntington															Main	Main		
Daisy	Haskiri Velazquez																	Main	Main
Mac Morris	Mitchell Hoog																	Main	Main
Lexi	Josie Totah																	Main	Main
Aisha	Alycia Pascual-Peña																	Main	Main
Jamie Spano	Belmont Cameli																	Main	Main
Devante	Dexter Darden																	Main	Main
Principal Toddman	John Michael Higgins																	Main	Main

== Main characters ==
=== Zack Morris ===
Zachary "Zack" Morris is a fictional character from the sitcoms Good Morning, Miss Bliss, Saved by the Bell, and Saved by the Bell: The College Years. He makes a guest appearance in the spin-off series Saved by the Bell: The New Class. He is portrayed by Mark-Paul Gosselaar. Though the character appeared in several different television programs, Gosselaar made a concerted effort to keep the character fundamentally the same through its various incarnations.

==== Incarnations ====
Junior High School

Set in a different continuity from the later series, Good Morning, Miss Bliss took place during Zack's eighth grade year at John F. Kennedy Junior High School in Indianapolis, Indiana. Screech and Lisa are two of Zack's friends in these episodes. Other friends that are regularly featured are Mikey Gonzalez, a close friend who is often involved in Zack's scheming, and Nikki Coleman, who often butts heads with Zack on many issues. His best friend Mikey is a good student and is often supportive of him, and helps him with schoolwork a lot. Mr. Belding was the principal of JFK Junior High, and often had to deal with problems Zack had caused. Zack's homeroom teacher and history teacher, Miss Carrie Bliss, also acts as a moral compass for Zack. In this series, Zack is already doing much of the scheming, betting, and manipulation for which he became known in the later series.

High school and college years

Zack demonstrates a flair for business throughout his teen years. However, in many subjects, notably history and literature, he is often seen receiving poor grades or displaying a lack of interest. Despite this, Zack achieves a very high score of 1502 on his SAT and gets accepted to Yale in his senior year. At the end of Saved by the Bell, Zack is planning on going to Yale. However, in Saved by the Bell: The College Years, we see Zack attending Cal U, along with Screech, Slater and, later on, Kelly, who joined the cast after the pilot episode. Their dorm was a suite, with the three guys in one room, three girls in another room and a common area in-between.

Assigned to watch over Zack and his friends was Mike Rogers, a former football player for the San Francisco 49ers. He works as a resident adviser, while also working towards a graduate degree. Mike often steps in to keep Zack in line. Dean McMann, however, is a more authoritative figure for whom Zack often causes problems.

Athletically, Zack participated in cross country, basketball, and track. He experienced some success in each of these sports. Zack is musically talented. He one time offers to play for free at a school dance so that more money could be spent on decorations. The band line-up featured Zack as a main vocalist while playing guitar, Jessie as a featured vocalist, Lisa on bass guitar, Screech on keyboard, and Slater on drums.

Zack helped restart the school radio station, and hosted a radio-thon to save the local teen hangout. He created a carnival to raise money for a school ski trip, and helped with several dances. He was also a member of the school's Junior ROTC program, and together with Screech, ran the Yearbook committee to produce a video yearbook. At one point, Zack took over as manager of the school store, and is also on the student council.

Governor of California

By 2020, Morris has been elected Governor of California and is the father of Bayside High student Mac Morris. Zack admittedly ran for governor as a way to get out of a $75 parking ticket and he later cut $10 billion in education funding from the state budget, which forces the closure of poorly funded schools, including Douglas High, whose students must now attend Bayside as well. Zack is married to his high school sweetheart Kelly Kapowski.

=== Kelly Kapowski ===
Kelly Kapowski (portrayed by Tiffani Thiessen) is the most popular girl in school and is head cheerleader and captain of the volleyball, swim, and softball teams. Though a hardworking student and role model, Kelly did find herself sentenced to detention on a couple of occasions. She is also a big fan of George Michael. She also is the love interest and later wife of Zack Morris. In contrast with her friends, she came from a more modest working class family and her father went through periods of unemployment. Kelly was the middle child in her family. She had three older brothers, a younger sister named Nicki, and two younger brothers named Kyle and Billy.

At the start of Kelly's freshman year, Zack had been trying to go out with her for as long as she could remember. For a while, a feud began between Zack and fellow student A.C. Slater over who would be her boyfriend, which caused her great stress, but a lot of fun at the same time. Kelly blushed numerous times when both Zack and Slater would hit on her, especially when it was done in front of other students. During her sophomore year, Slater conceded defeat to Zack and she and Zack began dating, whereas Slater thereupon pursued his interest in Jessie Spano.

Eventually, Zack wanted to go steady with Kelly, but she wasn't sure at first. She thought it over but by the time she decided to accept Zack's offer, he had already become infatuated with a young school nurse. That turned out to be a dead-end and when he tried to apologize to Kelly, she brushed him off. However, they were back together by the following episode ("Breaking Up is Hard to Undo"). The following school year, marked the end of Kelly's relationship with Zack. Kelly began working at The Max as a waitress and fell for her boss, Jeff Hunter (Patrick Muldoon), much to Zack's disappointment. This caused her and Zack to break up. Kelly dated Jeff for a while, until he is caught at an 18-and-over club (The Attic) with another girl.

Subsequently, Kelly and Zack became closer friends, while they dated other people. While vacationing in Palm Springs for Jessie Spano's father's wedding, Zack and Kelly flirted with the possibility of getting together again but ended up remaining friends.

In her senior year, she is once again pursued by Zack to accompany him to the prom. She agrees, and they get back together. As graduation approached, Kelly stated she could not afford to go to an out-of-state university and instead would attend community college. She and her friends graduated from Bayside High in 1993 and went their separate ways.

In Saved by the Bell: The College Years, Kelly is accepted into California University on a scholarship, joining Zack, Slater, and Screech as suitemates. She also became the new roommate of Leslie Burke and Alex Taber. While at Cal U., Kelly engaged in an affair with her anthropology professor, Jeremiah Lasky. Zack makes a final attempt to win her over when she decides to go on a "Semester on the Sea" program through the Mediterranean for three months. Zack proposed to Kelly, and she accepted.

Without much support from their families, Zack and Kelly had planned to get married in Las Vegas in Saved by the Bell: Wedding in Las Vegas. The couple managed to bring Slater, Screech, and Lisa Turtle with them for the event. Just prior to the exchange of vows at the ceremony at a cheap wedding chapel, Zack's parents showed up and stopped the wedding. They told Zack and Kelly that they would give them the wedding of their dreams. A few days later, Zack and Kelly had an elaborate outdoor wedding in the Las Vegas area. Lisa and Jessie stood as bridesmaids while Screech and Slater stood as groomsmen. The newlyweds then went on a honeymoon.

When Zack and Slater made guest appearances on Saved by the Bell: The New Class a few years later, Slater asked Zack how "the Mrs." (meaning Kelly) is doing, Zack replied, "Good."

By the time of the 2020 revival, Zack and Kelly have respectively become the governor and first lady of the state of California, and have a teen son named Mac.

=== Samuel "Screech" Powers ===
Samuel "Screech" Powers (portrayed by Dustin Diamond) is one of only two characters to appear as a series regular from the beginning of the franchise to its end. He appeared in Good Morning, Miss Bliss; Saved by the Bell; Saved by the Bell: The College Years; and Saved by the Bell: The New Class. Screech is seen as the geek of his peer group. He is particularly interested in insects and electronics/computers. While he is clearly a high academic achiever, Screech lacks common sense and social skills. Even though his theoretical knowledge of many subjects is quite high, his practical knowledge is often extremely low. For example, he builds an apparently sentient robot, yet he does not understand how babies are made. Screech's friends, who are more attractive and cooler than he is, still like him anyway and always include him in their plans.

In Good Morning, Miss Bliss, Screech is much like he is in all of his other incarnations, only younger. He mentions he has a brother in one episode, but since Good Morning, Miss Bliss takes place in an alternate continuity, this fact does not apply to the main Saved by the Bell series.

In Saved by the Bell, Screech is the only child of an unseen father and an Elvis-obsessed mother (guest star Ruth Buzzi). In addition, he has a dog named Hound Dog, and a robot pal named Kevin, whom he built and programmed himself and who exhibits artificial intelligence. He often exhibits low self-esteem when it comes to girls, in contrast to his more popular friends.

During his years at Bayside High, Screech frequently pursues classmate Lisa Turtle and is consistently turned down by her. However, she does agree to date him in one episode, only to spoil the date by talking through the movie. She also attends senior prom with him, after she is moved by his honesty about how hurt he is that no one wants to go to the prom with him and impressed by his willingness to stand by his earlier promise not to ask her.

It is revealed in the episode "Running Zack" that Screech is of Italian ancestry.

Screech does eventually end up with a girlfriend, Violet Anne Bickerstaff (played by Tori Spelling), and dates her for several episodes, even managing to win back the support of her upper-class parents after losing it on a disastrous dinner date.

Screech is frequently roped into scams by his best friend, Zack. As a running gag, he often unwittingly sabotages them. In spite of all his faults, Screech remains well liked by his friends.

Upon graduating, Screech and his friends Zack, Slater, and Kelly, attend California University in Saved by the Bell: The College Years. Screech remains there until his sophomore year, when he begins a work-study program at his alma mater, Bayside High, alongside Principal Richard Belding.

In Saved by the Bell: Wedding in Las Vegas, Screech attends Zack and Kelly's wedding. He served as Zack's best man in the wedding along with Slater. This is mentioned in an episode of Saved by the Bell: The New Class, which aired around the time of the movie's release.

From season two in Saved by the Bell: The New Class, Screech is initially in the role as Belding's administrative assistant as part of a work-study program. Screech retains the same bumbling tendencies he did as a teenager, often irritating Belding and leading to his new what-did-I-do catchphrase "Zoinks!" (an utterance originally made famous by Shaggy Rogers from Scooby-Doo). However, Screech remains at Bayside in this capacity until the end of the series. Mr. Belding leaves to pursue a new job at the University of Chattanooga at the end of the series.

He is mentioned to have become an astronaut in the International Space Station in the 2020 revival. Diamond died of cancer on February 1, 2021 at the age of 44 without appearing in the revived series. He was honored in the first episode of the second (and final) season of the revival series, without mentioning how the character died.

=== A.C. Slater ===
Albert Clifford "A.C." Slater (portrayed by Mario Lopez) is a popular jock who excelled in most sports (particularly football and amateur wrestling). An Army brat, he is an outsider, having transferred to Bayside in the first filmed episode (which aired later as a flashback). A.C. mentions that he has been to Bolivia, Italy, Iceland, and Berlin among other places. He becomes the school's star athlete, excelling as a wrestler and the quarterback of the football team, but does not excel in the classroom.

His father, Martin (a Major in the U.S. Army), appears in two episodes. His mother, Loretta, however, never appears onscreen. He also has a younger sister named J.B. whom Zack briefly began dating, much to Slater's chagrin. In the season four episode "Love Machine," his ex-girlfriend from Berlin visits and calls him by his real name, "Albert Clifford".

Much like Voorhies winning a role originally intended to be Jewish, Lopez was able to captivate the show's producers into casting him in a role that was originally written to be of Italian ancestry. Slater's ethnicity is discussed in the episode "Slater's War" during The College Years, where it is revealed that 25 years earlier A.C.'s father changed his last name from Sanchez to Slater so he could get into the military academy. Although the episode establishes that A.C. does not fluently understand Spanish, A.C. is seen speaking some broken Spanish to the kitchen staff of the Malibu Sands Beach Club.

At the start of freshman year in Saved by the Bell, Slater arrives as a transfer student, immediately making an enemy of Zack Morris by attempting to make a move on Kelly Kapowski. Both boys end up in detention after schemes to be with Kelly backfire on both of them. While in detention, Slater reveals to Zack that he had transferred in and out of various schools throughout his life due to his father being a Major in the army. Their mutual understanding of a father putting something else before his son would serve as an ice breaker between the two (Zack's own father was too busy with his job and never paid attention to him or his academics). By the end of the first season, Zack and Slater find themselves bonding over their similar social standing, popularity among women, and athletic abilities. During Season 2, after Kelly officially chooses Zack as her boyfriend, the rivalry between the two tones down and they begin to become friends. Early on, Slater grew into the habit of calling Zack "Preppy", which was originally intended as an ongoing insult. However, once they became friends, Slater continued to use the term as an affectionate nickname for Zack. Slater goes on to date feminist Jessie Spano on and off for the remainder of high school. Their clashing views on feminism, stemming from Slater's machismo, are a source of conflict and comedy throughout the series.

Throughout the course of the show, Slater and Zack compete for many other girls which often puts a strain on their friendship (one instance culminating in a brawl between the two during their senior year). In the end though, their friendship is more important to them than any girl that would possibly come between them.

In Saved by the Bell: The College Years, Slater is accepted into California University, along with Zack, Screech, and Kelly as suitemates and begins dating Alex Taber, one of Kelly's roommates. While there, Slater continues his passion for wrestling and works in the University's main restaurant. Along with Screech, Slater serves as Zack's best man at his wedding to Kelly in Las Vegas in Saved by the Bell: Wedding in Las Vegas. Slater makes two return guest appearances in Saved by the Bell: The New Class, firstly in "Goodbye, Bayside" Part 2, along with Zack and Lisa when a millionaire alumnus J. Walter McMillan plans to buy the school and tear it down for the purpose of constructing a condo, and in "Fire at the Max: Part 2", where he reminisces on fond memories he had with his friends at the diner after it was accidentally burned down by student Ryan Parker, who forgot to turn off the Christmas lights.

He becomes the gym teacher and coach of Bayside High in the 2020 revival.

=== Jessie Spano ===
Jessica "Jessie" Myrtle Spano (portrayed by Elizabeth Berkley) is a lifelong friend of Zack, Screech, Lisa and Kelly. She and Zack live next door to each other, and Zack regularly visits Jessie by climbing through her window. Her parents are divorced. She lives with her mother, who remarried in the third season, providing Jessie with a stepbrother, Eric (played by Joshua Hoffman) from New York City, seen in only two episodes. Jessie's father, David (played by George McDaniel), is the owner and manager of the Marriott Desert Springs in Palm Desert, California. He gets remarried in the hour-long "Palm Springs Weekend" episode to Leslie (played by Barbra Brighton), a much younger woman whom Jessie does not initially get along with and is against him marrying. She eventually accepts Leslie for who she is and becomes friends with her.

Jessie is portrayed as a liberal (she critiqued then-president George H. W. Bush), with strong feminist views. She is often the first to speak up when she feels something is unjust. Although seen as intelligent, Jessie has a somewhat neurotic streak.

Jessie is the class president. In a close election, she initially lost to Zack. However, Zack used underhanded techniques to win the election in order to get a free trip to Washington, D.C., but upon realizing that being class president would be a much better fit for his friend Jessie, Zack stepped down from office, naming Jessie the president. Jessie remained president for the remainder of her time at Bayside.

From sophomore year until the end of the series, Jessie dates athlete A.C. Slater on-and-off in an "opposites attract" relationship, which causes friction between the both of them. Slater's pet name for Jessie is "Mama", and Jessie's pet name for him is a "Pig" when she gets annoyed by his masculinity. Jessie and Slater's relationship is put to the test several times over the course of the series. Jessie experiences a brief romantic attraction to Zack when the two endure a kissing scene in the school play, but they ultimately realize that their feelings for each other are purely platonic. Additionally, she develops a crush on one-time character Graham (played by David Kriegel), with whom she spends cut day. (This last encounter ultimately leads to her and Slater's break up).

Most notable is Jessie's struggle with addiction to over-the-counter caffeine pills in the episode entitled "Jessie's Song." Pressure from school and social obligations, along with her desire to be accepted into Stanford University, drive Jessie to take caffeine pills obsessively in order to stay awake. Lulled into a false sense of security by the pills' legal status, she eventually gets hooked on them and has an emotional breakdown in front of Zack. Zack is ultimately able to calm her down and Jessie is able to get help before her self-medicating becomes too dangerous.

Another ongoing issue is Jessie's height. She often considers herself too tall and has therefore developed a bit of an insecurity complex, especially when it comes to shorter boys, and sometimes superficially judges men based on their height. Additionally, she is even known as Jessie "Legs" Spano to some. Jessie becomes a bit less judgmental of men's height when she begins dating Slater.

In an early episode, Jessie reveals that she attended dance camp as a child and, as such, is an experienced dancer. Jessie is also on the swim team. Jessie later joins Kelly and Lisa on the cheerleading squad (because she believes it'll look good on her college applications).

Before graduation, Jessie has her hopes on becoming valedictorian, but ultimately loses out to Screech. However, realizing how important it is to her, Screech secretly refuses the honor. After discovering what he did, Jessie recognizes just how much Screech deserves to be valedictorian and gives the title back to him.

After graduation, Jessie goes off to attend Columbia University.

In Saved by the Bell: Wedding in Las Vegas, Jessie, with Lisa, returns as one of Kelly's bridesmaids at Zack and Kelly's wedding in Las Vegas. This was her final appearance in the franchise until Berkley signed on to return for the 2020 sequel series, where Jessie serves as Bayside High's guidance counselor. Jessie got a Ph.D. at Columbia University and was a best-selling author of parenting books before she became a guidance counselor. She has a teen son named Jamie.

=== Lisa Turtle ===
Lisa Marie Turtle (portrayed by Lark Voorhies) is the rich girl of the group, whose parents both worked as physicians. She is frequently seen wearing designer clothing.

In her first appearance in Good Morning, Miss Bliss, Lisa plays a more secondary role than she would in the later incarnations of the series. She attends John F. Kennedy Junior High with Zack Morris and Samuel "Screech" Powers.

Throughout her high school years in Saved by the Bell, Lisa spends most of her time fighting off the affections of Screech, who is relentless in pursuing her (and eventually wins at least one date with her) and has been doing so since they were in Kindergarten. Despite her irritation with Screech, she does value him as a friend, and eventually comes to admire Screech's nobility when he abdicates his position as the class valedictorian in favor of Jessie Spano, who had a slightly lower grade point average than he did, but valued the position more. Lisa even went to the senior prom with Screech when she felt sorry that no one would go with him. He had promised to respect her comfort zone and not ask her, but she ultimately decided that she, actually, wanted him to be her prom date. Most of Lisa's time is spent in the company of schoolmates and fellow cheerleaders Kelly Kapowski and Jessie Spano.

Unlike the rest of her friends, Lisa does not have a long-term relationship during high school (despite having countless dates), although she has a short term romance with Zack Morris in the episode "The Bayside Triangle," much to the chagrin of Screech. However, this is forgotten about in following episodes. "Screech's Spaghetti Sauce" involves Screech on a date with a girl who is impressed by him, causing Lisa to be in a state of disbelief.

Upon graduating, Lisa is accepted into the Fashion Institute of Technology in New York City. Lisa only makes one guest appearance in Saved by the Bell: The College Years when she visits her former classmates Zack, Screech, Kelly, and A.C. Slater at California University in the episode "Wedding Plans", after hearing of Zack and Kelly's engagement. In Saved by the Bell: Wedding in Las Vegas, Lisa and Jessie were Kelly's bridesmaids for her wedding to Zack. Lisa returns to Bayside High along with Zack and Slater in "Goodbye Bayside: Part 2" (from Saved by the Bell: The New Class), where they are reunited with Screech (now working at Bayside on a work-study program) and their principal Mr. Belding when the school is under threat of being torn down by an alumnus.

In the 2020 sequel series, it is revealed that Lisa became a successful fashion designer and is living in Paris. She receives a video phone call from Jessie, Slater, Zack, and Kelly while they are all attending Bayside High's homecoming dance.

=== Mr. Belding ===
Richard Belding (portrayed by Dennis Haskins) is the principal of Bayside High School. In his first appearance in the pilot of Good Morning, Miss Bliss, Mr. Belding's first name was Gerald, and the character was played by Oliver Clark. Other than Miss Bliss, the character of Mr. Belding was the only one carried over when the show began production. The character also appeared in Saved by the Bell: The New Class and guest starred in "A Thanksgiving Story" (from Saved by the Bell: The College Years). He is one of only two characters to remain from the beginning of the franchise until the end (the other being Samuel "Screech" Powers). Mr. Belding's name is a pun referencing the onomatopoeia "ding" that comes from a bell, (a "bell ding"). His signature catchphrase is "Hey, hey, hey, hey! What is going on here?", usually uttered after walking in on something ridiculous occurring at the school.

Mr. Belding's most frequent nemesis is Zack Morris; however, throughout the series, it is abundantly clear the two like and respect each other, arguably because in "Save the Max" it is revealed that when Belding was a student himself he was a disc jockey and one who would rebel against school authority, prompting the comment that he was "the Zack Morris of the 1960's". On at least one occasion, Belding has even called Zack Morris "the son [he] never had". A small joke was also that Belding was open about his past failures with women prior to his marriage, such as when he was in the U.S. Army and in love with a North Vietnamese girl, where "even she was with the enemy!" Belding's family has appeared in the series on many occasions. The most frequent appearances were by his infant son, named in honor of Zack. When Belding's wife (Becky) went into labor in an elevator, Zack Morris, along with classmate Tori Scott, helped deliver him.

Much of Belding's humor comes from his attempts to make jokes, sing or being generally tricked and scammed by Zack. Despite Zack's ideas that he knew Belding inside and out, occasionally Belding would reveal that he had other ideas to deal with issues, thus outfoxing Zack. He also was against the Bayside-Valley High prank war and in spite of his best efforts to call a truce with Valley High's principal, the war continued until the end of the cheerleading competition when one of the students from Valley was exposed.

Belding also has a small rivalry with fellow teacher Mr. Tuttle, who was also in line for the position of Principal at Bayside. He, previously, had a friendly rivalry with Brandon Tartikoff over courtship of Belding's wife, but Tartikoff accepted that he got the short end of the straw and accepted the eventual presidency of NBC (an implicitly meta reference, since Tartikoff actually was president of NBC at the time) while Mr. Belding was "happily married and got to be principal of a school of great kids."

Belding remains the one constant between all the series and in the second season of The New Class, he is reunited with Bayside High alumnus Samuel "Screech" Powers, who is studying to become a teacher. Screech becomes Mr. Belding's administrative assistant until the end of the series, when Belding decides to take a job as the dean of the University of Chattanooga in Tennessee.

In 2012, Dennis Haskins reprised his role as Mr. Belding on the hit Nickelodeon series Victorious in the episode "April Fools Blank". He has since retired by the time of the 2020 revival.

=== Tori Scott ===
Tori Scott (portrayed by Leanna Creel) arrives at Bayside during senior year, making an immediate enemy of Zack Morris by parking her motorcycle in his usual parking space on her first day. Eventually, things thaw between Tori and Zack and they later begin dating, but broke up in the episode "The Will" due to Zack's insensitive behavior. After the episode "School Song," she is only mentioned once by Zack in the 2020 sequel series to Kelly, but she does not remember her.

== Bayside faculty ==
=== Mrs. Culpepper ===
Mrs. Culpepper (Maris Clement) is the school's de facto art teacher (although she is seen teaching history during Cut Day) and made appearances in both junior year and senior year. She is always involved in comical situations in which she bumps into lockers and mistakes inanimate objects for living things due to her bad eyesight. At one point she even accidentally made Mr. Belding think she is in love with him; when he talked to her about her "crush" she became completely flustered, and later punched him the face for continuing to "reassure" her that he had no romantic designs towards her.

=== Mr. Dewey ===
Mr. Dewey (Patrick Thomas O'Brien) is a math teacher who also oversaw detention. He represented the archetypal down-on-his-luck, more-bored-than-the-kids, depressed teacher but seemed to be respected by the kids on the grounds that nothing they did bothered or registered very much with him. He spoke in a monotonous voice, is sarcastic, always wore glasses, and once auditioned for American Gladiators. Mr. Dewey also appeared in the New Class and the SBTB revival series.

=== Doctor Mertz ===
Dr. Mertz (Avery Schreiber) is a science teacher that seems to want the students to enjoy his class, giving out awards such as a molecule hat to Screech. His Science test stresses Kelly because she has concert tickets that she won't get to use if she fails. Zack hoping to get on Kelly's good side arranges for Screech to tutor Kelly. The plan backfires when Kelly develops romantic feelings for Screech. Kelly manages to pass Dr. Mertz's test but finds that without the need for a tutor, she and Screech really do not have much in common.

=== Mr. Dickerson ===
Played by Raf Mauro, Dickerson is a history teacher known for his unfriendly demeanor and an impossible midterm that no student had passed in three years, something he seems to be very proud of. In the episode "The Fabulous Belding Boys," Dickerson has a nervous breakdown and is replaced by the very popular Rod Belding. He hasn't been seen since being forced to retire from Bayside at the request of Mr. Belding.

=== Nurse Jennifer ===
Jennifer (Nancy Valen) is Bayside High's new school nurse. She arrives as Nurse Butcher's (Justine Lenore) replacement in sophomore year. Zack asks Kelly to go steady with him, but while she is thinking it over, he falls for a (supposedly) new student, only to discover that she is actually the new school nurse. In Miss Simpson's classroom, she informs her students about the poems that they were supposed to write for English class. When it's Kelly's turn to read her romantically themed poem, Zack imagines his new found crush, Jennifer addressing it towards him.

Later in Zack's bedroom, he is practicing flirting with Jennifer while in front of a mirror and wearing a suit and tie. Soon, Jessie arrives via the open window and begins to inquire Zack about whether or not he's backing out on asking Kelly to go steady with him. Zack immediately confesses to Jessie about being in love. When a disgusted Jessie asks Zack if he somehow plans on dating Kelly and Jennifer at the same time, Zack begins to fantasize about being a surgeon with Jennifer and Kelly as his nursing assistants. Although Jessie notes to Zack about how upset Kelly is going to be, Zack reminds Jessie that she promised not to tell anybody. While back in Miss Simpson's classroom, Zack feigns illness as a means of going back to the nurse's office to see Jennifer. In the nurse's office, Zack tells Jennifer that his head is feeling hot despite it feeling cool when Jennifer touches it. Shortly after Jennifer leaves the room to get her thermometer to take Zack's temperature, Slater walks in for his dreaded flu shot. But with the curtain drawn forward, Zack mistakenly believes that Slater is Jennifer. It is there that Zack inadvertently confesses to Slater his true feelings about Jennifer. Slater proceeds to blackmail Zack into another flu shot so that he won't tell Kelly or anybody else about his feelings for Jennifer. Shortly thereafter, Kelly walks in and is told by Zack that they should date other people for the time being.

Later on, when Jessie, Slater and Lisa see Kelly suddenly leave The Max in a huff, Lisa wonders what is troubling Kelly. Lisa though is immediately able to decipher Jessie and Slater's secret language regarding the promise that they made to Zack about not telling anybody about his infatuation with Jennifer. So Lisa then, leads the way in telling Jennifer about Zack's neglect of Kelly. Jennifer when informed of this tells Jessie, Slater and Lisa to leave everything to her as she has had plenty of experience dealing with "sick people". The next day, Zack enters the nurse's office upon Jennifer's request.

When Zack sees Jennifer, she dressed decidedly more provocatively than her usual white nurse uniform: A purple T-shirt, black tube miniskirt, pantyhose, a black western waist belt, shoulder pads, hoop earrings and black pumps. Shortly thereafter, Jennifer locks the door, sensually takes off her white coat, and takes out the stick that was holding her hair in a bun. Zack then nervously listens while Jennifer tells him about how she can't stop thinking about him and how he's sweet unlike her fictional husband.

Zack then nervously listens while Jennifer tells him about how she cannot stop thinking about him and how he is sweet unlike her fictional husband. Zack proceeds to panic when Jennifer tells him that her "husband" is a professional wrestler with a violent temper. When Zack attempts to leave, Jennifer immediately corners him and tells him about how they should not only run away together, but also marry and have many children. Zack then tries to tell Jennifer that he already has a girlfriend in Kelly and that one girl is all that he can handle. Before finally allowing him to leave, Jennifer grabs Zack by the collar and boldly asks him if he wants a girl or a woman.

=== Mrs. Simpson ===
Mrs. Simpson (Pamela Kosh) is the nearly deaf, British-accented teacher who taught English class. She also appeared at the beginning of junior year and embarrassed Kelly and Zack by referring to them as "Bayside's Most Beloved Couple" just a short while after they broke up. She said she didn't like Zack, and once wore a hearing aid that she discarded because the titular bell caused painful sound waves to assault her. She also made an appearance in the pilot episode of The New Class.

=== Coach Sonski ===
Coach Sonski (played by comedian Monty Hoffman) is the wrestling coach at Bayside High. He is overweight with a testosterone-laden personality, and has been shown to be a sexist (mainly in "Hold Me Tight"). He depends on Slater as his star athlete.

Coach Sonski is also shown as Bayside's auto shop instructor in the episode where Jessie's new stepbrother comes to California. He retains his sense of humor as well as his macho attitude throughout the episodes, though he once confessed to watching Oprah because he is "sensitive to dames".

=== Mr. Tuttle ===
Tuttle (portrayed by Jack Angeles) is an enthusiastic, overweight teacher (perhaps a foil for the thin, dour Mr. Dewey). He is well-liked by the students but had a mutually unfriendly relationship with Mr. Belding, stemming largely from Tuttle having been runner-up to Belding when Bayside had chosen a new principal. He also served as a leader in the local teachers' union, a driver's education teacher, and a music teacher.

=== Ms. Wentworth ===
Ms. Wentworth (portrayed by Carol Lawrence) is the Social Studies teacher during sophomore year who piqued Zack's interest in his family heritage by assigning a family research project. She also taught the class about subliminal advertising, which led to a predictably harebrained scheme from Zack. Ms. Wentworth is one of Bayside's more enthusiastic and unorthodox teachers. Like Mr. Tuttle, she is one of the few teachers who genuinely seems to like Zack, and seems to be popular with her students, because she is serious about her job but treats them nicely and has a good sense of humor.

=== Mr. Testaverde ===
Mr. Testaverde (portrayed by John Moschitta Jr.), also known as "Terrible" Testaverde, is the Social Studies teacher at Bayside High during freshman year who is hated by the students. He is known for talking extremely fast when explaining a topic, fast enough to make even the smartest kids in class baffled. He first appears in the Season 1 episode "The Gift".

== Bayside students ==
=== Violet Ann Bickerstaff ===
Violet (Tori Spelling) is a nerdy character (appearing in 3 episodes in seasons 2 and 3) who was originally dating Maxwell Nerdstrom, but she dumped him in favor of Screech (whom she commonly addresses by his real name "Samuel"), as Maxwell had treated her poorly. In her first appearance, she knocks over Screech's mother's statue of Elvis Presley. This leads to a moneymaking scheme by the gang to get $250 for a new statue. Violet comes from an upper class family who disapproves of her relationship with Screech, mainly due to the fact he is from a lower class, despite the fact he and Violet share many common interests. In another episode, Violet is shown to have a beautiful singing voice, but is too shy to sing solo for Bayside's abysmal school choir until Screech supports her. She then quits the choir after Screech embarrasses her at a disastrous dinner with her folks, but when he comes out and sings her opposite, saving the day for her it convinces the Bickerstaffs that he is a good guy, and they say they no longer object to him dating their daughter.

=== Ginger ===
Ginger (portrayed by Bridgette Wilson) is a pretty but vacuous blonde (appearing in five season 4 episodes) who dates Zack a few times, but annoys him because she has little to say beyond asking him if she has lipstick on her teeth.

=== Rhonda Robistelli ===
Rhonda (portrayed by Kirsten Holmquist) is Bayside's resident tomboy. She is a tall, lanky girl with disheveled blond hair (appearing in 3 first-season episodes). She and Zack have one date, during which she forcibly plants a kiss on his lips. Rhonda also tries to join the cheerleading squad in "Save That Tiger" and tries out for the team when one of the regulars is injured right before the big competition against Valley. Her audition is clumsy and the girls eventually talk Jessie into taking the spot.

=== "Big" Pete Stonebreaker ===
Pete Stonebreaker (Bryan Cooper) is one of the tallest nerds at Bayside (appearing in two episodes in seasons 3 and 4) who made his first appearance in an episode during the Malibu Sands storyline as a volleyball player when Screech was trying to recruit some members to replace Gary, an injured volleyball player. He seems to be a leader amongst the nerds, and has been able to fit in socially at times with more popular students.

=== Louise ===
Louise (Lara Lyon) is a nerdy Bayside student with blonde hair in pigtails and horn-rimmed glasses (appearing in 3 episodes in seasons 2 and 4) who is sometimes shown as a friend of Screech's. She enrolls in the Army JROTC program at Bayside after Zack convinces her that in the US Army men outnumber women. She is placed on Zack's "nerd team" in a physical competition to compete against Slater's better qualified team. Zack learns a lesson about leadership when he must encourage his team to realize their potential, which included telling Louise she could climb a rope. She returns in the episode "1-900-Crushed", where she confides she has feelings for the jock "Moose", whose feelings are mutual, but she worries about the mismatched relationship. She is the queen bee of the school's nerd clique, and Zack goes out on a date with her during his campaign to earn the nod for writing the new school song, knowing she would convince Bayside's geeks and dweebs to vote for him. Slater tells another high-ranking geek that Zack's "date" with Louise could set a precedent where other popular guys begin dating geek girls, which inspired the geeks to cast their votes in the song contest for Screech's entry.

=== Moose ===
Moose (portrayed by Mark Clayman) is a very dumb and childlike jock, much like his fellow football teammate Ox (appearing in two episodes in seasons 2 and 4). He is seen dating Louise in the episode "1-900-Crushed", and also has a minor speaking role in the episode "Student-Teacher Week."

=== Maxwell Nerdstrom ===
Nerdstrom (portrayed by Jeffrey Asch) is a rich nerd (appearing in two episodes in seasons 2 and 4) who is Violet Bickerstaff's boyfriend and treats her rather poorly, although he does buy her a gold-plated pocket protector. His poor treatment of her is one of the factors in her becoming Screech's girlfriend. While most of the nerds comport themselves with a bumbling dignity at most, Nerdstrom goes above and beyond, behaving as a pompous, stuck-up geek. He defeats Zack in a game of poker, but gets his comeuppance in the end. Perhaps Maxwell's most noted accomplishment at Bayside is mistakenly kissing Screech's dog, "Hound Dog" believing him to be Jessie, to everybody's delight. He is later humiliated when Screech pointed out that Maxwell kissed his dog and tells Maxwell to stay out of Violet's life.

=== Ox ===
Ox (Troy Fromin) is a member of the Bayside football team and an archetypal "dumb jock" (appearing in nine episodes in seasons 3 and 4) who pals around with Slater when Slater is without his friends. Despite being a jock, he dates a female nerd, and is often shown to be gentler and more sensitive than his size and oafish behavior would suggest. He is among the students who get drunk senior year at the toga party.

Fromin played a completely different one-shot character named "Skud", a thuggish biker with a smoking habit, in "No Hope With Dope".

== Belding family ==
=== Rod Belding ===
Rod Belding (portrayed by Ed Blatchford) is Mr. Belding's brother, who steps in as a substitute teacher during junior year after Mr. Dickerson has a mental breakdown. He initially makes a hip impression on the students because of his happy-go-lucky attitude, world-weary demeanor, and tales of defying authority and schoolwork. Rod arranges to take the students on the rafting trip for their annual class trip (ruining Mr. Belding's plans to visit Yosemite Park) and attempts to teach them about it. Mr. Belding is overshadowed by his brother's connection with the students, which is evident in a minor confrontation they have when Mr. Belding tells his brother he is not to be teaching the kids whitewater rafting on official class time. After Zack accuses him of being jealous of Rod, he soon finds out what he's really like on the inside. During a confrontation with the brothers, Rod tries to skip out of the trip just to meet a stewardess named Inga. Mr. Belding is furious that Rod would abandon his commitment to the students and orders him never to come back to Bayside. Rod leaves as Zack ducks behind some lockers to avoid his sight. Not wanting to upset his students, Mr. Belding claims that Rod is ill. However, when he offers to chaperone the trip instead, the students happily and gratefully accept. Zack, who had secretly overheard the incident, tells his principal that "we got the better Belding."

=== Mrs. (Becky) Belding ===
Becky Belding, Mr. Belding's wife (portrayed by Louan Gideon), is featured in the episode "Earthquake!", in which she, Zack and Tori get stuck in an elevator after a minor earthquake. During the time in the elevator she goes into labor and gives birth to the Beldings' son with the help of Zack, who becomes the baby's namesake.

=== Penny Belding ===
Richard Belding's niece (portrayed by Jodi Peterson) is blonde and bubbly, but no one wants to date her as she is related to the Principal. During Zack's sophomore year at Bayside, he earns himself a one week suspension. In order to be released from serving time and to be able to attend Kelly's upcoming party, he signs a treaty with Mr. Belding agreeing to take Penny out on a date on Friday in lieu of serving his sentence. After making this agreement, Kelly informs Zack that her birthday party would also be that Friday, since the Max was booked on Saturday. In order to make Kelly's party, Zack trains Screech to imitate him, so that he could take Penny out on the date instead; this works out well because Penny is attracted to Screech, but she angers Kelly when she says that she is hot for "Zack," thinking that was who Screech was.

=== Zack Belding ===
Richard and Becky Belding's son, born when Zack, Mrs. Belding, and Tori get stuck in an elevator. He also appears in two episodes of Saved by the Bell: The New Class.

== Morris family ==
=== Derek Morris ===
Derek Morris (portrayed by John Sanderford) is the father of Zack. He is a businessman who spends little time with his son. He is very strict and opposed at first for Zack to marry Kelly in the TV Movie Saved by the Bell: Wedding in Las Vegas.

=== Melanie Morris ===
Melanie Rhonda Morris (portrayed by Melody Rogers) is the mother of Zack. She's more fresh and less strict than her husband Derek. She adores Zack but still she knows some of her son's tricks. She supported Zack's marriage but couldn't do much to aid him in order to respect her husband, in the TV movie Saved by the Bell: Wedding in Las Vegas.

== Kapowski family ==
=== Frank Kapowski ===
Frank Kapowski (portrayed by John Mansfield) is the father of Kelly and her six siblings. Kind and loving, he worked at a defense plant, but is laid off in the season two premiere "The Prom". He is also seen at Zack and Kelly's wedding in Saved by the Bell: Wedding in Las Vegas giving Kelly away, and at the reception with his wife and two of Kelly's younger brothers.

=== Billy Kapowski ===
Billy Kapowski is Kelly's baby brother, whom she places in the care of her friends in the episode "The Babysitters" so that she could have her cheerleading picture taken for the school yearbook. Zack is often left alone with Billy as the others make excuses or have other commitments to attend to. Because of this, Billy and Zack bond quickly to the point where Zack distrusts anyone else to care for the baby. He is forced, however, to allow Jessie and Lisa to look after him in their Home Economics class. They lose track of Billy when Screech goes to fetch Billy for Zack but mistakes a doll for the baby. The gang eventually find him in Mr. Belding's office, and at the end of the episode he speaks his first word: "Zack."

=== Kyle Kapowski ===
Another brother of Kelly's, he disrupts the end of one of Kelly and Zack's dates. Kyle later dumps water on Zack from the second floor of their house after Zack met Melvin Nerdly.

=== Nicki Kapowski ===
Nicki Kapowski (portrayed by Laura Mooney) is Kelly's tomboyish little sister who develops a crush on Zack. She becomes convinced that Zack feels the same way after he mixes up her phone call with Kelly's (while running the "Teen Line"). Although she is only thirteen and in the seventh grade, she nonetheless shows up at Bayside High to visit Zack, sporting a more feminine look and demanding a kiss. After trying various ploys to turn her off (including dressing up like a geek and trying to gross her out with a pet spider), Zack finally has to tell her the truth: he is not interested in her; he is in love with Kelly. More angry than hurt, she insults Zack for trying to scare her away instead of having the courage to tell a thirteen-year-old girl how he really feels.

=== Harry Bannister ===
Harry Bannister (portrayed by Dean Jones) is Kelly's maternal grandfather from the movie Saved by the Bell: Hawaiian Style. He invites Kelly and her friends to stay at "The Hawaiian Hideaway", a rustic hotel in Hawaii. However, someone else is out to buy his land and build a hotel/resort complex, and the gang has to save it.

== Slater family ==
=== Maj. Martin Slater ===
Major Martin Slater (Gerald Castillo [passed away 05/04/2023]) is A.C.’s strict but loving father, who is frequently transferred due to Army orders. Although he wants his son to attend West Point and enter the military as he himself had done, he eventually changes his views when he sees that Slater wants to attend college on a wrestling scholarship and figure things out from there. It is later revealed in "Saved by the Bell: The College Years" that Martin's last name was actually "Sanchez," causing an embarrassed A.C. Slater to realize his father concealed his Latino heritage (presumably simply due to his decidedly non-Latino appearance) to avoid rampant bigotry as he entered the military.

=== J.B. Slater ===
Jennifer or "J.B." (Rana Haugen) is Slater's younger sister. She shows up suddenly to visit A.C. and Zack develops a crush on her. This makes A.C. angry as he knows how big a womanizer Zack is, and forbids them from seeing each other. Once J.B. learns of this, she confronts Slater angrily and tells him to butt out of her love life. He eventually accepts that she will be dating his best friend and thus wouldn't be so bad. He still warns Zack to "treat her right". She does not appear in any other episodes besides "Slater's Sister."

== Jessie Spano's stepfamily ==
=== Leslie Eisen ===
Leslie Eisen (Barbra Brighton) is the aerobics instructor (in the two-part season 3 episode "Palm Springs Weekend") as well as Jessie's future step-mom. Although Zack makes a pass at her in the beginning of the episode, the gang later finds out Leslie is marrying Jessie's dad. Jessie refers to her future step-mom as an "aerobics bimbo", insults and lies to her, and asks her dad flat-out to not marry her. Her father firmly says he loves Leslie and is marrying her, period. Jessie then refuses to attend the wedding. At the end of the episode, however, Zack convinces Jessie to do the right thing and they arrive (though slightly late) to the wedding on a golf cart, where Jessie apologizes and Leslie forgives her.

=== Eric Tramer ===
Eric Tramer (Josh Hoffman) is Jessie's stepbrother from New York (in the two-part season 3 episode "The Wicked Stepbrother"). At first excited to have a new stepbrother, Jessie quickly grows to dislike his rough, confrontational and offensive personality. Eric causes trouble and conflict at Bayside, particularly with Zack who feels threatened by the new prankster bad-boy, even going so far as to offer up Mr. Belding's car for auto shop class dissection to get Zack into trouble. However, after a punch and a speech from Jessie (after he said she was "just a chick"), he reforms his ways, entirely reassembles Belding's car, and apologizes to all. He was planning to return to New York City, but the gang, particularly Lisa, who had developed feelings for him, convinces him to remain at Bayside.

== Turtle Family ==
=== Dr. Turtle ===
Lisa's father, Dr. Turtle (Henry Brown), appears in the episode "The Lisa Card". He gives Lisa her first credit card for 'emergencies only'; however, she uses it to spend nearly $400 on clothes. At the end of the episode, she confesses that she spent her emergency credit card balance on clothes and Dr. Turtle forces her to pay the credit card off herself.

=== Judy Turtle ===
Lisa's mother Judy Turtle (Susan Beaubian) appeared in two episodes of the series, "Operation Zack" and "Drinking and Driving". In "Operation Zack", she treats Zack at the hospital (where she works as a surgeon) after he accidentally hurts his knee when Mr. Belding bumps into him in the locker room. In "Drinking and Driving", Lisa and her friends crash her mother's car into a telephone pole after getting drunk at a party, and Lisa has to deal with the repercussions of her actions, including telling Judy what happened to her car.

== Powers Family ==
=== Roberta Powers ===
Roberta Powers (Ruth Buzzi) appeared in the episode "House Party". She is Screech's mom, who is a huge Elvis fan. In the episode, she trusts Screech to be home alone for a weekend and gives him a long list of rules to abide by. Her favorite Elvis statue gets broken by Screech's girlfriend, Violet, and the gang has to throw a party to raise money for the statue replacement.

=== Kimberly ===
Kimberly (Christine Kendrick who was uncredited) is Screech's cousin who appeared in the episode "The Aftermath". She was one of Zack's blind dates, which was intended to cheer Zack up after his rough breakup with Kelly. Slater, Jessie, and Lisa start wondering how Screech is related to her, due to the strong dissimilarities in their appearances, until Screech tells them she is adopted.

== Malibu Sands employees ==
=== Stacey Carosi ===
Stacey Carosi (portrayed by Leah Remini, appears in six episodes of season 3). She works for her father, Leon Carosi, at the Malibu Sands beach resort as a staff manager, in charge of all of the employees. Zack Morris is immediately smitten with her, thinking she's a member of the resort, and learns, much to his chagrin, that not only is she *not* a member, she's A)the boss's daughter and B) Zack's boss. Throughout the summer, she and Zack progress from flirtation to hostility to eventual romance, marked by their kiss under the fireworks during the Fourth of July celebration.

=== Leon Carosi ===
Leon Carosi (portrayed by Ernie Sabella) is Stacey's father, who quickly takes a strong dislike to Zack due to his constant snarky remarks and attempted courting of his daughter. He is also, as the General Manager of The Malibu Sands, the gang's boss for the summer. He is similar to Principal Richard Belding in that he is an authority figure who Zack frequently annoys due to his constant schemes, sarcastic jokes, and eventually his romantic interest in Mr. Carosi's daughter Stacy. Leon Carosi, while outwardly appearing to be a very narcissistic, pompous, and uncaring boss, is often bumbling and easily flustered. Despite his initial dislike of Zack, he eventually warms up to him as time progresses. He sees perhaps some of his own traits in Zack- drive, desire to succeed - and as the summer continues, he softens on his stance towards Zack, eventually approving of Zack and Stacy's relationship and even selling Zack his car. At the end of the summer, Mr. Carosi even tells Zack he's welcome to come back to work at The Malibu Sands in the future.

== The Max's employees ==
=== Max ===
Max is the owner of The Max, as well as, an amateur magician (played by Ed Alonzo, in 20 episodes during the first two seasons). He often advises the students of Bayside on their choices and dilemmas, and re-inforces his points with magic tricks. The gang consider him a friend.

=== Jeff Hunter ===
Jeff Hunter (played by Patrick Muldoon) has a brief tenure (in three episodes of season 3) as the Max's manager who likes Kelly Kapowski. As a result, Zack and Kelly break up, allowing Jeff and Kelly to begin a relationship. Unfortunately, very soon afterwards Jeff's infidelity was revealed when he is seen dancing with and kissing a girl at an over-18 club known as The Attic. Kelly breaks up with him as a result.

=== James the Actor ===
James (portrayed by Mark Blankfield) is an out-of-work actor who takes a job as a waiter at the Max (appearing in two episodes in seasons 2 and 3). He claims that he was a student at acting school. Most of the work he seems to get as an actor on the show is in the employ of Zack. In the season 3 episode "S.A.T.'s," Zack hires James to do a double role as Stanley Alan Taylor (S.A.T.), who orders Mr. Belding to lighten up Zack's workload after his grades have dropped, then to play an admissions officer for Harvard who acts snooty and elitist to everyone. In the season 2 episode "Rent-a-Pop," Zack hired James to impersonate his father after Belding demanded he meet with him as a condition to go on a ski trip in order to report on Zack's failing grades; to which Zack was convinced his real father would not let him go if he knew the truth. Zack then has to hire James again to play Mr. Belding after his real father accepts a letter to meet Belding once more, where James falsifies Zack's grades as spectacular. James the Actor also made two appearances on Saved By the Bell: The New Class.

== Miscellaneous characters ==
=== Frank and Laura Benton ===
Frank and Laura Benton (Stephen Mendel and Jennifer McComb) are a homeless father and daughter, respectively (in the two-part season 3 episode "Home for Christmas"), who catches the eye of Zack and the gang around Christmas time. Laura, who works in a department store with Kelly, seems to be a tentative love interest for Zack; she is very shy around Zack about her homelessness. Zack, Slater and Screech get Frank to a hospital when he passes out at the mall from hunger, and then they find out he is Laura's father. Laura's boss accuses her of stealing a suit jacket that Kelly set aside to buy, so Frank would have an outfit that he could wear to job interviews. Later, Laura's boss apologizes and gives Laura the jacket for free. Eventually, the Morris family takes in the Bentons until they could "get back on their feet."

=== Kevin the Robot ===
Kevin the Robot (operated and voiced by Mike Lavelle) was a creation of Screech's with artificial intelligence (appearing in three episodes during seasons 1 and 2), who lives in Screech's room and usually dishes out advice and witty remarks. His appearances include him as Screech's assistant when Screech is doing a magic show; and as assistant hall monitor when Screech is nominated for the post by his classmates, to make up for forgetting Screech's birthday.
