= Mark-Paul Gosselaar =

American actor (born 1974)

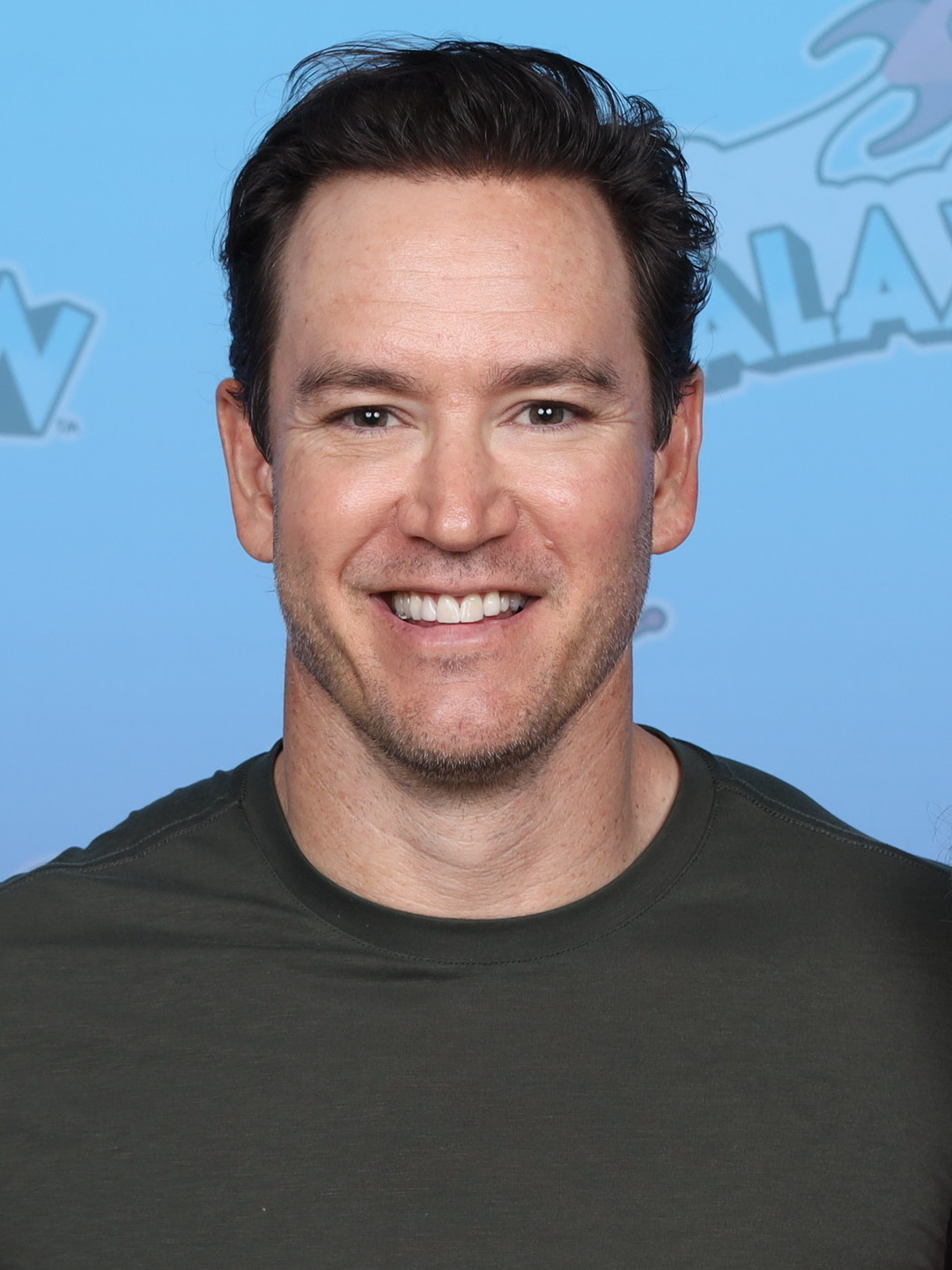
- Gosselaar at GalaxyCon Richmond in 2023
- Born: Mark-Paul Harry Gosselaar; March 1, 1974 (age 52); Los Angeles, California, U.S.
- Occupations: Actor, model
- Years active: 1986–present
- Spouses: Lisa Ann Russell (m. 1996; div. 2011); Catriona McGinn (m. 2012)
- Children: 4

Mark-Paul Harry Gosselaar (/ˈɡɒslər/; born March 1, 1974) is an American actor. He is best known for playing Zack Morris in the NBC series Saved by the Bell (1989–1993), its sequel Saved by the Bell: The College Years (1993–1994), and the next-generation revival on Peacock (2020–2021). For this role, he won three Young Artist Awards in 1991 and 1993, and a YoungStar Award in 1995, as well as other accolades.

He was the lead in the film Dead Man on Campus (1998). He played Detective John Clark Jr. in the ABC police drama NYPD Blue (2001–2005), Peter Bash in the TNT legal series Franklin & Bash (2011–2014), and Paul Johnson in the ABC sitcom series Mixed-ish (2019–2021). He starred in the single-season Fox series Pitch (2016) and The Passage (2019). He was the main antagonist in the weekly NBC procedural drama Found (2023–2025).

== Early life ==
Gosselaar was born in Panorama City, Los Angeles, the son of Paula Gosselaar, a flight attendant for KLM Royal Dutch Airlines – and Hans Gosselaar – a plant supervisor for Anheuser-Busch. He is the youngest of four children, and was the only one not born in the Netherlands.

His Netherlands-born father is of German and Dutch Jewish ancestry. Gosselaar's Jewish paternal great-grandparents Hartog and Hester Gosselaar were killed during WWII. His Dutch-Indonesian mother was born in Bali. He has described himself as "half-Asian”. He speaks Dutch, and was fluent for a time, at home. His parents later separated.

Gosselaar's mother was his manager. He began modeling at the age of five, and appeared in commercials for Cookie Crisp cereal and Smurf merchandise, later being cast in guest spots on television series. He spent his teenage years in the Santa Clarita Valley in Southern California, where he attended Hart High School.

Gosselaar has said that his natural hair color is brown, but he was "blondish" as a kid. His hair was bleached blond throughout his run on Saved by the Bell.

== Career ==
Gosselaar first came to public notice as the star of the hit television comedy series Saved by the Bell, which aired on NBC from 1989 to 1993. His character, Zack Morris, was adapted from the short-lived Disney Channel sitcom Good Morning, Miss Bliss; although that show was cancelled after one season, NBC executives believed that a similar show, with Zack Morris as the lead, had potential for success. He reprised the role in two TV movies and a less-successful spin-off, Saved by the Bell: The College Years. In 1994, he appeared as Zack Morris in a second spin-off series Saved by the Bell: The New Class in the episode "Goodbye, Bayside – Part 2", along with Mario López as A.C. Slater and Lark Voorhies as Lisa Turtle.

In 1996, he appeared in the TV-film She Cried No, as a college student who date-rapes his best friend's sister at a fraternity party. In 1998, he starred in the feature film Dead Man on Campus. Later that same year, Gosselaar played the central character in the TV drama Hyperion Bay, which lasted 17 episodes. In 2001, he starred in the movie The Princess and the Marine, with Marisol Nichols. He also starred in the short-lived WB series D.C. From 2001 to 2005, he played Detective John Clark on ABC's NYPD Blue. During his time on the show, he appeared in Atomic Twister in which he played Jake Hannah, a deputy who is traumatized over his mother's death and must help after a series of tornadoes hits a nuclear power plant in a small Tennessee town; the movie also stars fellow NYPD Blue alum Sharon Lawrence, who plays Corrine Maguire. After the series ended, he joined the cast of ABC's Commander in Chief, which lasted only one season. He appeared on the HBO series John from Cincinnati. He then gained the starring role of defense attorney Jerry Kellerman in the Steven Bochco-produced Raising the Bar, which debuted on September 1, 2008, on TNT, then it was canceled in November 2009 after two seasons.

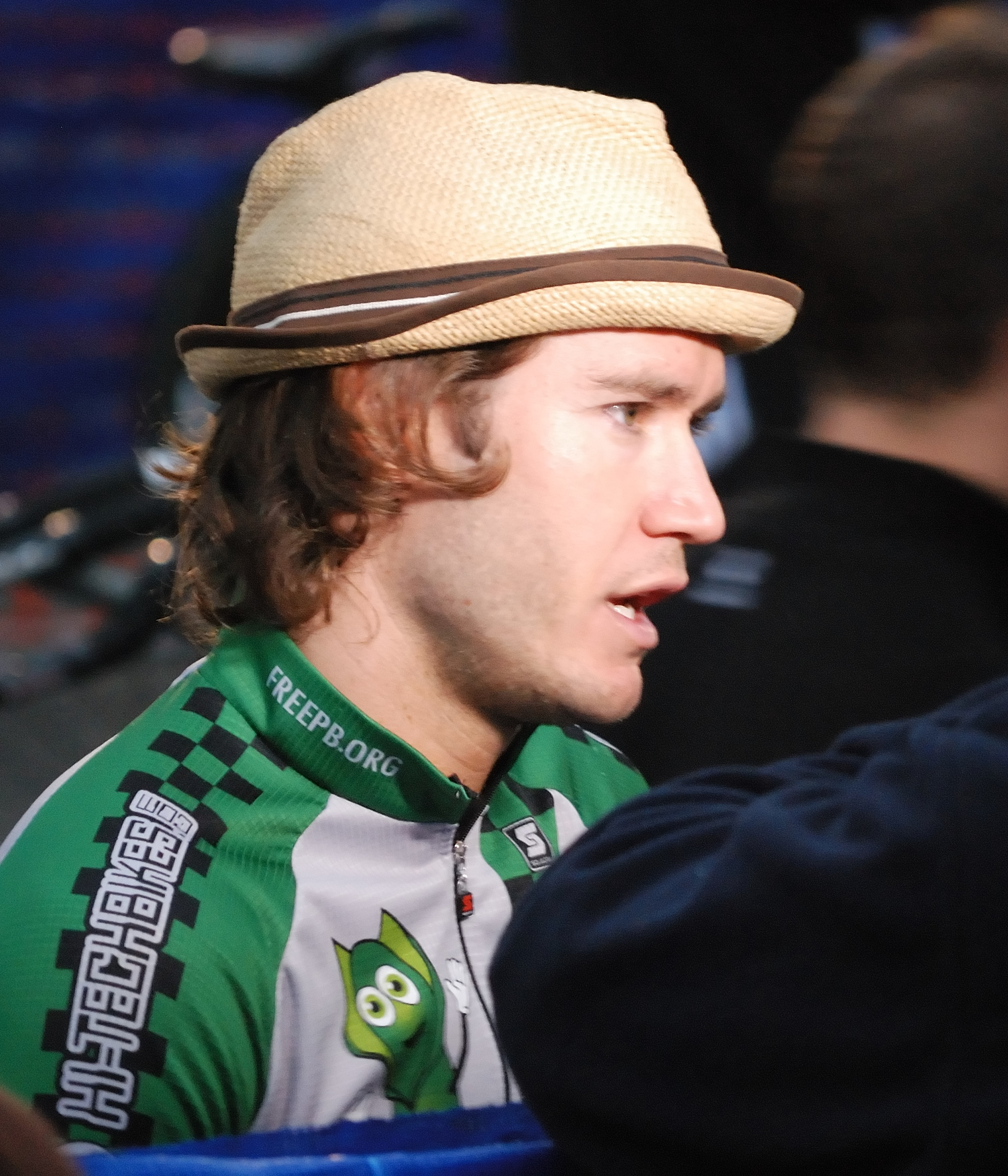
Gosselaar (pictured) in 2008 at the Malibu Triathlon

On June 8, 2009, Gosselaar appeared on Late Night with Jimmy Fallon in character as Zack Morris to promote his show Raising the Bar, indicating that the name Mark-Paul Gosselaar is his stage name and declaring, as Zack, that he would participate in a Saved by the Bell "Class" reunion that is being spearheaded by Fallon. On February 4, 2015, Gosselaar reunited with Mario Lopez, Elizabeth Berkley, Dennis Haskins and Tiffani Thiessen on The Tonight Show Starring Jimmy Fallon, where they appeared in a Saved by the Bell sketch with Fallon.

In October 2009, he made his off-Broadway stage debut in Theresa Rebeck's play The Understudy with The Roundabout Theatre Company. The show extended its limited New York run until January 17, 2010.

Gosselaar began filming the TNT series Franklin & Bash on March 28, 2010. The series premiered on June 1, 2011. On November 11, 2014, it was announced that the series was canceled, after four seasons. The FOX series Pitch cast Gosselaar in the main role of Mike Lawson, star catcher and team captain, in February 2016, and premiered on September 22, 2016. On May 1, 2017, it was announced that the series was canceled, after one season. He appeared in two episodes of Tiffani Thiessen's cooking show, Dinner at Tiffani's.

In 2019, Gosselaar began playing the lead role of Paul Johnson (Rainbow's father) in ABC comedy series Mixed-ish (spin-off and prequel series of Black-ish). He took over the role from Anders Holm, who played the character in the pilot episode. Gosselaar also reprised his role as Zack Morris in the 2020 sequel series Saved by the Bell.

== Personal life ==
In a July 2009 interview with People, Gosselaar revealed that while Saved by the Bell was in production, he dated, at different times, his three female co-stars: Lark Voorhies, Tiffani Thiessen, and Elizabeth Berkley. He remains friends with his Saved by the Bell castmates.

In 1996, Gosselaar married former model Lisa Ann Russell. Together, they have two children: a son (b. 2004) and a daughter (b. 2006). After 14 years of marriage, Gosselaar and Russell announced their separation in early June 2010. Gosselaar filed for divorce June 18, 2010, and it became final in May 2011.

Gosselaar was engaged to advertising executive Catriona McGinn in August 2011. They married July 28, 2012, at the Sunstone winery in Santa Ynez, California. They have a son (b. 2013) and a daughter (b. 2015).

Gosselaar is a sports car enthusiast, race car driver, track cyclist, dirt biker, and pilot. In 2005, he competed in the Far West Championships for track cycling. He won the Category 4/5 Sprint Championship event at the Encino Velodrome.

Gosselaar is friends with Greg White, the voice and play-by-play announcer for the MotoAmerica Championship. The two toured the West Coast of California on Honda motorcycles in 2010.

Among his many sports and athletic accomplishments, Gosselaar is also a Brazilian Jiu Jitsu brown belt, having trained under Rafael Ramos and Nelson Montiero.

Gosselaar sold his Sherman Oaks home in February 2022 and currently resides in Los Angeles.

== Filmography ==
=== Film ===
Year	Title	Role
1993	White Wolves: A Cry in the Wild II	Scott James
1994	The St. Tammany Miracle	Carl
1995	Twisted Love	D.J.
1996	Freshman Fall	Scott
1996	Sticks & Stones	Dale
1996	Kounterfeit	Paco / Danny
1998	Dead Man on Campus	Cooper Frederickson
2002	Atomic Twister	Deputy Jake Hannah
2011	Hide	Alex Wilson
2011	12 Dates of Christmas	Miles Dufine
2015	Heist	Marconi
2016	Precious Cargo	Jack
2021	Kid 90	Himself
2023	The Portrait	Brookes

=== Television ===
Year	Title	Role	Notes
1986	Highway to Heaven	Rolf Baldt	Episode: "The Torch"
1986	Stingray	Eric Murray	Episode: "Below the Line"
1986	The Twilight Zone	Tim Conrad	Episode: "What Are Friends For?"
1988	Necessary Parties	Chris Mills	TV movie
1988	The Wonder Years	Brad Gaines	Episode: "Dance with Me"
1988	Punky Brewster	Walker Wimbley	Episode: "One Plus Tutor Is Three"
1988	Charles in Charge	Philip	Episode: "Runaround Charles"
1988–89	Good Morning, Miss Bliss	Zack Morris	Lead role (13 episodes)
1989–93	Saved by the Bell	Zack Morris	Lead role (86 episodes)
1990	Murphy Brown	Wes	Episode: "I Want My FYI"
1992	Saved by the Bell: Hawaiian Style	Zack Morris	Movie
1992	Blossom	Kevin	Episode: "Losing Your... Religion"
1993–94	Saved by the Bell: The College Years	Zack Morris	Lead role (19 episodes)
1994	For the Love of Nancy	Tommy Walsh	Movie
1994	Saved by the Bell: Wedding in Las Vegas	Zack Morris	Movie
1994	Saved by the Bell: The New Class	Zack Morris	Episode: "Goodbye Bayside"
1996	Brothers of the Frontier	Hiram Holcomb	TV movie
1996	She Cried No	Scott Baker	TV movie; also known as Freshman Fall
1996	Specimen	Mike Hillary	TV movie
1997	Dying to Belong	Steven Tyler	Movie
1997	Born Into Exile	Chris	Movie
1998–99	Hyperion Bay	Dennis Sweeny	Main role (17 episodes)
2000	D.C.	Pete Komisky	Main role (7 episodes)
2001	The Princess and the Marine	Jason Johnson	Movie
2001	Beer Money	Tim Maroon	Movie
2001	Law & Order: Special Victims Unit	Wesley Jansen / Peter Ivanhoe	Episode: "Sacrifice"
2001–05	NYPD Blue	Det. John Clark Jr.	Main role (87 episodes)
2002	Alikes	Chris	Movie
2002	Atomic Twister	Deputy Jake Hannah	Movie
2002	Hitched	Michael	Unsold pilot
2005	Over There	John Moffet	2 episodes
2005–06	Commander in Chief	Richard 'Dickie' McDonald	Recurring role (10 episodes)
2006	The House Next Door	Kim	Movie
2007	Law Dogs	Evan Marlowe	Unsold pilot
2007	John from Cincinnati	Jake Ferris	3 episodes
2008	Robot Chicken	Zack Morris / Improv Employee (voice)	Episode: "Boo Cocky"
2008–09	Raising the Bar	Jerry Kellerman	Main role (25 episodes)
2010	Rizzoli & Isles	Garrett Fairfield	Episode: "Money For Nothing"
2010	Weeds	Jack	Episode: "Gentle Puppies"
2011–14	Franklin & Bash	Peter Bash	Lead role (40 episodes), also directed episode: "Honor Thy Mother"
2011	12 Dates of Christmas	Miles Dufine	Movie
2012	Don't Trust the B— in Apartment 23	Himself	Episode: "A Reunion"
2013	Men at Work	Tim	Episode: "Weekend at PJ's" (uncredited)
2013	Happy Endings	Chase	Episodes: "The Ex Factor", "Un-sabotagable"
2014	Flipping Out	Himself	Episode: "Due Date"
2014–15	CSI: Crime Scene Investigation	Jared Briscoe / Paul Winthrop	Recurring roles (4 episodes)
2015	Truth Be Told	Mitch	Main role (10 episodes)
2016	Pitch	Mike Lawson	Main role (10 episodes)
2016	Dinner at Tiffani's	Himself	Episode: "Christmas at Tiffani's"
2016	Celebrity Name Game	Himself	
2016	Family Guy	Zack Morris (voice)	Episode: "Chris Has Got a Date, Date, Date, Date, Date"
2018	Nobodies	Mark-Paul Gosselaar	Recurring role (12 episodes)
2019	The Passage	Brad Wolgast	Main role (10 episodes)
2019–2021	Mixed-ish	Paul Johnson	Main role (Two seasons)
2020–2021	Saved by the Bell	Zack Morris	Recurring role, also producer (10 episodes)
2022	Barry	Himself	Episode: "ben mendelsohn"
2023–2025	Found	Hugh "Sir" Evans	Main cast
2023–2026	Will Trent	Paul Campano	Recurring role (5 episodes)

=== Director ===
Year	Title	Note(s)
2014	Franklin & Bash	Episode: "Honor Thy Mother"
2016	Murder in the First	Episode: "Daddy Dearest"
2021	Saved by the Bell	Episode: "The Gift"
2025	Found	Episode: "Missing While Manipulated"

=== Audio ===
Year	Title	Role	Notes
2021	The Coldest Case	Ari	5 episodes

== Awards and nominations ==
Young Artist Award

- 1989: Nominated, Best Young Actor in a Cable Family Series – Good Morning, Miss Bliss
- 1990: Nominated, Outstanding Young Ensemble Cast – Saved by the Bell
- 1991: Best Young Actor Starring in an Off-Primetime Series – Saved by the Bell
- 1992: Nominated, Best Young Actor Starring in an Off-Primetime Series – Saved by the Bell
- 1993: Nominated, Best Young Actor Starring in an Off-Primetime Series – Saved by the Bell
