= Bethany Rooney =

American film director

- Born: 1956 (age 69–70); Columbus, Ohio
- Other names: Beth Hillshafer; Bethany Rooney Hillshafer
- Education: Bowling Green State University
- Occupations: Television director and producer
- Years active: 1985–present

Bethany Rooney (formally credited as Beth Hillshafer and Bethany Rooney Hillshafer) is an American television director and producer who has directed more than 36 episodes of television series and made-for-television films.

Since her directorial debut in 1985 in an episode of St. Elsewhere, she has directed multiple episodes from a vast number of television series, most notably The Wonder Years, Beverly Hills, 90210, “90210”, Crossing Jordan, Melrose Place, Melrose Place (2009), Ally McBeal, One Tree Hill, Gilmore Girls and She Spies, whilst other credits include Las Vegas, Desperate Housewives, Inconceivable, Dawson's Creek, Boston Public, Ed, Jack & Jill, Grey's Anatomy, Private Practice, Dream On, Castle, Revenge, Arrow among other series.

In addition, Rooney has directed various episodes of the American TV series, NCIS.

She has also directed a number of made-for-television films, including Locked Up: A Mother's Rage (1991) starring Cheryl Ladd and Jean Smart, Mixed Blessings (1995), Remembrance (1996), Full Circle (1996), She Cried No (1996), When Innocence Is Lost (1997) and The Promise (1999).
