= Lark Voorhies =

American actress (born 1974)

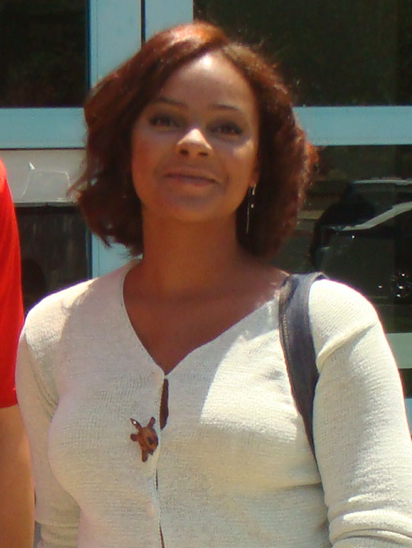
- Voorhies in 2008
- Born: Lark Holloway; March 25, 1974 (age 52); Nashville, Tennessee, U.S.
- Occupations: Actress; singer; spokeswoman; model; author
- Years active: 1987–present
- Known for: Lisa Turtle – Good Morning, Miss Bliss, Saved by the Bell, The Bold and The Beautiful, In the House
- Spouses: Miguel Coleman (m. 1996; div. 2004) Jimmy Green (m. 2015; div. 2015)
- Partner(s): Martin Lawrence (1993–1994)

Lark Voorhies (born Lark Holloway; March 25, 1974) is an American actress. She played Lisa Turtle on the NBC sitcom Saved by the Bell (1989–1993) and was nominated for the Young Artist Award six times, winning in 1990 and 1993 for her work on the show.

== Early life ==
Born Lark Holloway to Wayne and Tricia Holloway in Nashville, Tennessee, she later adopted "Voorhies" as a stage name. Her mother named her "Lark" after the character in the 1972 film Cool Breeze, played by Margaret Avery. By the time Voorhies was two years old, the family had moved to Pasadena, California. During this period, her mother took her to a talent agent, because of her belief that Voorhies was "a natural-born ham." However, her first audition ended poorly when she froze up. She appeared in a national television commercial for Universal Studios Tour at age 12, advertising its upcoming King Kong attraction. She said of the experience: "I was on this tram screaming with all these other people. I had such a great time doing that."

== Entertainment career ==
=== Acting ===
Voorhies made her acting debut at the age of two. Though photogenic, she was shy, and her mother put Voorhies' acting career on hold until she was more comfortable in front of the cameras. Later, at the age of fourteen, Voorhies reappeared on an episode of Small Wonder in 1988. In June of that same year, she landed the role of Lisa Turtle in Disney Channel's television series Good Morning, Miss Bliss and appeared in thirteen episodes from 1988 to 1989. She remained as the same character, as did Zack, Screech, and Mr. Belding, after Disney dropped the series and it was picked up and retooled by NBC and renamed Saved by the Bell.

Voorhies has since appeared in several television sitcoms and soap operas. She played the role of single mom Wendy Reardon on Days of Our Lives in 1993. On The Bold and the Beautiful Voorhies played the role of amiable intern fashion-designer, Jasmine Malone beginning in September 1995. She was released from her contract in November 1996 when her role required her to act in sex scenes, which the actress refused to do citing her religious beliefs as a Jehovah's Witness.

In 1995, Voorhies guest-starred in the Star Trek: Deep Space Nine episode "Life Support". During the same year, Voorhies guest-starred in the Family Matters season six episode "Home Sweet Home", as Eddie's upstairs dream girl. She has continued to act in various roles since then, such as In the House, in which she played the girlfriend-turned-wife of Alfonso Ribeiro’s character, Dr. Max Stanton. Previously, she played Ribeiro's love interest twice on The Fresh Prince of Bel-Air. Besides sitcoms, Voorhies also appeared in movies and direct-to-video films. In 2001, Voorhies played a major role in the film How High as Lauren, a Harvard student. She was involved in a 1990 movie adaptation of the book The Black Man's Guide to Understanding Black Women and played Ana Smith in the 2008 movie The Next Hit. Although she only has two acting credits since 2008, and none since 2012, Voorhies' representatives cited a busy work schedule when she did not appear in a SBTB-based mini-reunion sketch on Late Night with Jimmy Fallon alongside Gosselaar, Lopez, Thiessen, and Dennis Haskins in 2015. Voorhies publicly stated in 2020 that she was "hurt" that she was not invited to participate in the Saved by the Bell sequel series on Peacock. Later that year, however, NBC announced that Voorhies would in fact reprise her role as Lisa Turtle for the new show.

=== Music ===
Voorhies has appeared in several music videos. She plays Kenny Lattimore's love interest in his debut video "Never Too Busy", from his 1996 self-titled debut album. In Boyz II Men's music video "On Bended Knee", she plays Wanya's girlfriend. She is featured in Montell Jordan's "Somethin' for the Honeyz" and in Dru Hill's "These Are the Times". In 1994, Voorhies was in a group originally called the X-Girls (now known as Geneva) with Stacee and Yashi Brown (the daughters of singer and oldest Jackson family sibling, Rebbie Jackson). Voorhies founded and was the lead singer in Third Degree, an alternative band.

=== Writing ===
Over 2010 and 2011, Voorhies self-published three books she authored: Reciprocity, Trek of the Cheshire, and A True Light.

== Personal life ==
Voorhies dated her Saved by the Bell co-star Mark-Paul Gosselaar for three years from August 1989 to August 1992 during the show's run. Voorhies was engaged to actor Martin Lawrence in 1993 but it was later called off in 1994. Voorhies married Miguel Coleman in 1996. They separated in 2001, and divorced in 2004.

On May 30, 2006, Voorhies filed a lawsuit against The National Enquirer for libel over an article that included claims published in June 2005 that she had a drug problem. The case was dropped in less than two months.

Voorhies met music engineer Jimmy Green at a networking event in 2014. After a year of dating, Voorhies and Green married on April 30, 2015, at a chapel in Las Vegas, Nevada. Voorhies filed for divorce in October 2015 after six months of marriage.

Voorhies was diagnosed with schizoaffective disorder in 2015 and did not publicly reveal it until 2020.

== Books authored ==
- Voorhies, Lark (2010). Reciprocity. New York, New York: iUniverse. ISBN 978-1450200660.
- Voorhies, Lark (2011). True Light. New York, New York: iUniverse. ISBN 978-1450243544.
- Voorhies, Lark (2011). Trek of the Cheshire. Bloomington, Indiana: iUniverse. ISBN 978-1462025985.

== Filmography ==
=== Television ===
Year	Title	Role	Notes
1988–1989	Good Morning, Miss Bliss	Lisa Turtle	13 episodes
1988, 1989	Small Wonder	Brandie Ross; Binky	"When You Hear the Beep" "The Tattletale"
1989	The Robert Guillaume Show	Danica	Episode: "Educating Ann"
1989–1993	Saved by the Bell	Lisa Turtle	86 episodes
1992	The Fresh Prince of Bel-Air	Cindy	Episode: "Mama's Baby, Carlton's Maybe"
1992	Saved by the Bell: Hawaiian Style	Lisa Turtle	TV Movie
1993	Martin	Nicole	Episodes: "The Break Up" (Parts 2 & 3)
1993	Getting By	Tasha	Episodes: "Men Don't Dance", "Turnabout Dance"
1993–1994	Days of Our Lives	Wendy Reardon	
1994	Saved by the Bell: The College Years	Lisa Turtle	Episode: "Wedding Plans"
1994	Saved by the Bell: Wedding in Las Vegas	Lisa Turtle	TV Movie
1994	Me and the Boys	Denise	Episode: "Talent Show"
1994	Saved by the Bell: The New Class	Lisa Turtle	Episode: "Goodbye Bayside" (Part 2)
1995	CBS Schoolbreak Special	Breena Black	Episode: "What About Your Friends"
1995	Star Trek: Deep Space Nine	Leanne	Episode: "Life Support"
1995	Family Matters	Dream Girl	Episode: "Home Sweet Home"
1995–1996, 2004	The Bold and the Beautiful	Jasmine Malone	Originated the role (Jan. 1995 – Nov. 1996); reprised in April 2004 – June to July 2004
1997	Malcolm & Eddie	Lydia	Episode: "Club Story"
1997	The Last Don	Tiffany	Miniseries
1997–1999	In the House	Mercedes Langford	18 episodes
1998	The Love Boat: The Next Wave	Johari Mayfield	Episode: "I Can't Get No Satisfaction"
1999	Mutiny	Sarah	TV Movie
1999	The Parkers	Chandra	2 episodes
2000	Grown Ups	Stacy	Episode: "J's Pet Peeve"
2001	Fire & Ice	Holly Aimes	TV Movie
2002	Widows		Miniseries
2008	Robot Chicken	Lisa Turtle / Betty Childs / Borg Queen (voice)	Episode: "Boo Cocky"
2020–2021	Saved by the Bell	Lisa Turtle	3 episodes

=== Film ===
Year	Title	Role	Notes
1997	Def Jam's How to Be a Player	Lisa	
2000	Longshot	Woman at Bar	Alternative title: Jack of All Trades
2001	How High	Lauren	
2002	Civil Brand	Lil' Momma	
2008	The Next Hit	Ana Smith	
2009	Mimi's Place	Sydney	Short film
2011	Measure of Faith	Kim	Direct-to-video
2012	Little Creeps	The Dean	Direct-to-video

== Awards and nominations ==
Year	Association	Category	Nominated work	Result
1989	Young Artist Awards	Best Young Actress in a Cable Family Series	Good Morning, Miss Bliss	Nominated
1990	Young Artist Awards	Outstanding Young Ensemble Cast	Good Morning, Miss Bliss	Nominated
1990	Young Artist Awards	Best Young Actress Starring	Good Morning, Miss Bliss	Won
1991	Young Artist Awards	Best Young Actress Starring in an Off-Primetime Series	Saved by the Bell	Nominated
1992	Young Artist Awards	Best Young Actress Starring in an Off-Primetime Series	Saved by the Bell	Nominated
1993	Young Artist Awards	Best Young Actress Starring in an Off-Primetime Series	Saved by the Bell	Won
