= Atomic Twister =

2002 made-for-TV disaster film directed by Bill Corcoran

- Print advertisement
- Written by: Ron McGee
- Directed by: Bill Corcoran
- Starring: Mark-Paul Gosselaar; Sharon Lawrence
- Theme music composer: Phil Marshall
- Country of origin: United States
- Original language: English

Production
- Producer: Richard D. Arredondo
- Cinematography: Donald Duncan
- Editor: Allan Lee
- Running time: 86 minutes
- Production companies: Once Upon A Time Films; Carlton America

Original release
- Network: TBS Superstation
- Release: June 9, 2002

Atomic Twister is a 2002 American made-for-television disaster film starring Sharon Lawrence and Mark-Paul Gosselaar which revolves around a series of tornadoes that damage a nuclear reactor in a small town in western Tennessee, in turn causing a near-meltdown at the plant. The film originally premiered on TBS Superstation on June 9, 2002.

== Plot ==
A series of tornadoes cripple Hellman-Klein Nuclear Power Plant located in Basset County, West Tennessee by damaging a power transformer and a generator, killing the plant's security guard Stu (Carl Lewis) in the process, and leaving the plant with very little power to operate. Hellman-Klein's shift supervisor Corrine Maguire sets out to try and contact the Nuclear Regulatory Commission (NRC), while an operator, Neville erroneously shuts down non-vital systems, which include the electric pumps in an attempt to reduce power. Just then, a second tornado hits the plant, damaging the diesel pumps, losing almost all controls. Meanwhile, Campbell Maguire, the plant's shift supervisor's 12-year old son, is caught in the twisters. His babysitter, Stacy is killed and he runs away towards the plant on his bike.

When the diesel pumps fail, the staff try to restart the electric pumps but to no avail. The nuclear reactor overheats, causing coolant to evaporate from the waste pool, threatening to expose radioactive material. The staff attempt to initiate SCRAM procedures to try to shut down the nuclear reactor, but the computer fails to respond. With no communications between the plant and the sheriff's department and the NRC, Neville decides to manually shut down the reactor himself in order to divert the reactor's coolant to the waste pool to buy the operators more time, taking full responsibility for ordering the staff to shut down the electrical pumps while Corrine is away trying to establish contact. He successfully does so, but is now himself locked inside the containment room.

Deputy Sheriff Jake, a neighborhood friend of Corrine, and whose mother was killed by a tornado during his childhood, searches for Campbell and finds him on the road. On the way they both discover Jake's girlfriend, Ashley, trapped on a steep hillside in her car. Jake goes down to rescue her, nearly putting himself and Ashley at risk when her car slides over the cliff but Campbell saves their lives, risking his own to do so when he is given an option to escape. Jake lauds Campbell as a hero and lets a relieved Corrine know of her son's survival and heroism.

Firemen who arrived at the site began spraying water into the reactor pool, but it only slows down the evaporation. Meanwhile, a disused diesel generator is found in the original blueprints by the NRC, and the plant workers plan to hook it up to the electric pumps to save the plant. They order some diesel fuel for it, but the tanker truck driver panics at the idea of driving in the adverse weather. Jake, a former truck driver, intercepts the fleeing truck driver and delivers the diesel to the plant himself. At the plant, the heat is starting to prove too much for the firemen and they start to pass out while the water from the hoses is having very little effect. Mere minutes before meltdown, Jake helps the firefighters while Corrine hooks up the fuel and eventually manages to start the generator, restarting the pumps and allowing it to refill the waste pool. Although the plant is damaged, a nuclear meltdown is averted.

Campbell and Corrine are finally reunited as Jake and Ashley set a date to get married. Corrine watches on over Neville; who has suffered terminal radiation poisoning from being trapped inside of the locked reactor containment room, and thanks him for his "self-sacrifice" as Neville is wheeled away to the hospital.

== Cast ==
- Mark-Paul Gosselaar as Deputy Jake Hannah
  - Jared Michael Thomas as Young Jake
- Sharon Lawrence as Corinne Maguire
- Joanna Morrison as Stacy
- Carl Lewis as Securityman Stu
- Jonathan Blick as Potter (as Johnny Blick)
- Meryl Main as Gail Clark
- Daniel Costello as Campbell Maguire
- Charmaine Guest as Ashley Bishop
- George Henare as Manuel Fluentez
- John Leigh as Deputy Rollins
- John Sumner as Neville
- Corbin Bernsen as Sheriff C.B. Bishop
- Sara Wiseman as Lisa Gilmore
- David Aston as Man at Cliff
- Paul Barrett as Fuel Tanker Driver
- Grant Bridger as Maguire's Neighbor
- Katrina Devine as Gloria
- Peter Feeney as Fireman

== Real-life inspiration ==
This television film was inspired by a real-life near disaster that had taken place on June 24. 1998, when an F2 tornado hit the Davis-Besse Nuclear Power Station in Ohio resulting in the loss of off-site power. Despite that, the film bears no resemblance to the actual events at Davis-Besse.

== Location ==
Despite taking place in Tennessee, the film was shot in New Zealand. Locations included Huntly Power Station, Meremere Power Station and a farm along State Highway 2.

== Streaming release ==
Since 2019, the film is available for streaming online on The Roku Channel, IMDb TV, Vudu, Tubi TV and YouTube Premium. It was made available on Peacock as of July 2023.
