= Saved by the Bell: The College Years =

American television sitcom (1993–1994)

- Genre: Teen sitcom
- Created by: Sam Bobrick
- Developed by: Elaine Aronson
- Directed by: Jeff Melman
- Starring: Mark-Paul Gosselaar; Mario Lopez; Dustin Diamond; Anne Tremko; Kiersten Warren; Bob Golic; Tiffani-Amber Thiessen
- Country of origin: United States
- Original language: English
- No. of seasons: 1
- No. of episodes: 19

Production
- Executive producer: Peter Engel
- Running time: 22 minutes
- Production companies: Peter Engel Productions; NBC Productions

Original release
- Network: NBC
- Release: May 22, 1993 – February 8, 1994

Related
- Saved by the Bell

Saved by the Bell: The College Years is an American television sitcom, and sequel to Saved by the Bell. It is the third incarnation of the franchise, and ran on NBC for one season, premiering on May 22, 1993, and airing its final episode on February 8, 1994. It is the only series of the franchise to air on primetime television instead of Saturday mornings – most episodes aired on Tuesday evenings. The series follows Zack, Screech, and A.C. Slater, and their three female suitemates, including Kelly Kapowski, in the dorms at college. It was followed by a television film, Saved by the Bell: Wedding in Las Vegas, which aired in October 1994.

== Premise ==
In the series pilot, six characters live in the dorms at the fictitious California University, or Cal U, under the watchful eye of Mike Rogers, their resident adviser. The first-year dorm residents include Zack Morris, Screech Powers, and A.C. Slater from the original Saved by the Bell, along with newcomers Leslie Burke, Alex Tabor, and Danielle Marks. After The College Years pilot, Danielle Marks, played by Essence Atkins was written out, and was replaced on the show with Zack's former Saved by the Bell girlfriend, Kelly Kapowski. The series revolves around the troubles each of the six characters gets into every week, as well as Zack's various schemes to try to get his suitemates, first Leslie, and then Kelly, to fall for him. Later in the series, Dean McMann, played by Holland Taylor, becomes involved with trying to rein in the first-years' antics.

== Cast ==
- Mark-Paul Gosselaar as Zack Morris
- Mario Lopez as A.C. Slater
- Dustin Diamond as Samuel "Screech" Powers
- Tiffani Thiessen as Kelly Kapowski
- Anne Tremko as Leslie Burke
- Kiersten Warren as Alex Tabor
- Bob Golic as Mike Rogers
- Essence Atkins as Danielle Marks (pilot only)

Also Starring

- Patrick Fabian as Professor Jeremiah Lasky
- Holland Taylor as Dean Susan McMann

Guest

- Dennis Haskins as Mr. Richard Belding
- Lark Voorhies as Lisa Turtle

== Episodes ==
No.	Title	Directed by	Written by	Original release date	Prod. code	Viewers (millions)
1	"Pilot"	Jeff Melman	Elaine Aronson	May 22, 1993	60500	9.4
Zack, Slater, and Screech start school at Cal U, where they find the adjustment to college life is harder than they expected.
2	"Guess Who's Coming to College?"	Jeff Melman	Andrew Guerdat & Steven Kreinberg	September 14, 1993	60501	14.2
Zack's pursuit of his suitemate Leslie is complicated by the arrival of a new transfer student – his old high school girlfriend, Kelly.
3	"Zack, Lies & Videotape"	Jeff Melman	Mark Fink	September 14, 1993	60502	14.2
Zack receives an interesting anthropology assignment from the class' new professor, Lasky. He has to conduct a field study of what women want. Meanwhile, Slater tries to gain weight to be a heavyweight wrestler, and Rogers offers to help Screech as his personal weightlifting trainer.
4	"Rush Week"	Jeff Melman	Jeffrey Duteil	September 21, 1993	60503	12.8
Zack and Slater worry that Screech might ruin their efforts to join a fraternity.
5	"Slater's War"	Jeff Melman	Renee Palyo	September 28, 1993	60504	11.0
Slater's involvement with a student activist leads him to embrace his Hispanic heritage.
6	"The Homecoming"	Jeff Melman	Debra Fasciano	October 5, 1993	60505	12.0
Zack is invited to a homecoming banquet by the guest of honor, a football hero who could help him score in some business, while Kelly is threatened with come-ons by the alum. Meanwhile, Slater feels embarrassed being with Alex who shows off her mascot uniform at the banquet and Leslie asks Screech to go with her to shock her visiting snobbish parents.
7	"The Poker Game"	Jeff Melman	Mark Fink	October 12, 1993	60506	12.8
Zack, Slater, and Screech try to set Rogers up on a date with a lit female professor to get him out of the dorm so they can have a poker game. Meanwhile, Kelly, Leslie, and Alex develop a crush on their new karate instructor, John Hammer, and vie with each other to try to win his affections.
8	"Prof. Zack"	Jeff Melman	Andrew Guerdat & Steve Kreinberg	October 19, 1993	60507	11.8
While the girls put together a male pinup calendar in order to buy a big screen TV, Zack poses as Lasky in order to date an admirer of the professor's.
9	"Screech Love"	Jeff Melman	Jeffrey Duteil	October 26, 1993	60508	10.9
Zack gets Screech to tutor a tennis star that he is dating, but the woman likes Screech and this causes conflict between Zack and Screech.
10	"Dr. Kelly"	Jeff Melman	Noah Taft	November 2, 1993	60509	10.2
Kelly's well-paying job as a waitress has her reconsidering her thoughts of becoming a doctor. Mike trains to try out for the 49ers with Zack, Slater, and Screech.
11	"A Thanksgiving Story"	Jeff Melman	Brett Dewey & Ronald B. Solomon	November 23, 1993	60510	10.4
After car trouble strands them at the college, the gang helps Mike, Leslie, and Screech prepare Thanksgiving dinner for a group of inner-city kids.
12	"Teacher's Pet"	Jeff Melman	Debra Fasciano	December 7, 1993	60512	8.5
While Screech hides a lab monkey destined for the zoo, Zack discovers Kelly's crush on Professor Lasky.
13	"Kelly and the Professor"	Jeff Melman	Mark Fink	December 14, 1993	60513	10.7
A jealous Zack strikes back at Kelly and Professor Lasky with a vengeance by spreading the word about their affair, which climaxes at a costume ball. Meanwhile, Rogers gives the rest of the gang papers to fill out on a perfect mate profile for a psychology project, and Screech ends up getting the same mark as Alex.
14	"A Question of Ethics"	Jeff Melman	Renee Palyo	December 21, 1993	60511	9.8
After a very tough new professor takes over their ethics class, the gang faces a dilemma when Zack gets his hands on a copy of the midterm.
15	"The Rave"	Jeff Melman	Jeffrey Duteil	January 4, 1994	60514	9.4
With Mike gone and in need of money for a trip to Cancun, Zack and the gang stage a rave in the dorm.
16	"Bedside Manner"	Jeff Melman	Renee Palyo	January 11, 1994	60515	9.0
Kelly is still pining over Professor Lasky, and Zack is trying to find ways of getting her attention back on him.
17	"Love and Death"	Jeff Melman	Andrew Guerdat & Steve Kreinberg	January 22, 1994	60516	6.5
After a popular professor dies, Zack adopts a new attitude to life - one filled with risks.
18	"Marry Me"	Jeff Melman	Noah Taft	February 8, 1994	60517	13.5
Kelly is planning to go on a three-month cruise abroad for the summer. When Zack finds out, he desperately tries to cling onto her. He tries to make Screech drop out of travelling on the trip so he can take his place. Eventually, Zack makes a big choice to hold on to Kelly: he asks her to marry him. Meanwhile, Slater feels guilty when he sees another girl behind Alex's back since she shares the same interest as he, while Leslie finds out and tries to make him come clean with Alex about his dissatisfaction with their romance.
19	"Wedding Plans"	Jeff Melman	Bennett Tramer	February 8, 1994	60518	13.5
Zack and Kelly talk about their futures, as they confront the possibilities of marriage. Slater is against the plans, while Screech wants to be Zack's best man, and decides to throw a bachelor party that goes incredibly wrong. Lisa Turtle arrives and wants to be Maid of Honor at Kelly and Zack's wedding. But she's got a battle on her hands, with Leslie and Alex also wanting to assume the position of Maid of Honor.

== Home media ==
Saved by the Bell: The College Years was released on DVD in Region 1 by Image Entertainment on August 17, 2004.

Title	Ep#	Region 1	Region 2	Region 4	Distributors
Saved by the Bell: The College Years	19	August 17, 2004	N/A	N/A	Image Entertainment

== Film ==
A 90-minute TV movie, Saved by the Bell: Wedding in Las Vegas, was produced to wrap up the series. The events of the final episode of the series lead directly into the film, which shows the characters on a road trip to Las Vegas for Zack and Kelly's impending wedding, and the comic misadventures they have along the way. Tom Jicha of the Sun-Sentinel said, "This movie would have been more appropriate for the time period in which all these stories began - Saturday morning." The movie was later split into four individual episodes when the series entered syndication.

== Saved by the Bell: The College Years novels ==
Five novelizations based on the show (four based on the main series and one based on the TV movie "Wedding in Las Vegas") were released in late 1994 and early 1995 by the publisher Aladdin Paperbacks, all written by Beth Cruise. The books all feature the main cast, and have similar storylines that relate to the main plots in the TV sequel.

Title	ISBN	Release Date(s)
Freshman Frenzy	(ISBN 0020411154)	August 1, 1994
Zack Zeroes In	(ISBN 0020427891)	September 1, 1994
Exit, Stage Right	(ISBN 0020427921)	October 1, 1994
Mistletoe Magic	(ISBN 0020427948)	December 1, 1994
To Have and To Hold	(ISBN 0020427956)	March 31, 1995

== Crossovers ==
Zack and Slater, and Lisa, who only appears in the follow up Wedding in Las Vegas film, all appear again on the Saved by the Bell: The New Class, in its second-season finale episode, "Goodbye Bayside: Part 2". Slater appears one additional time on The New Class, in the fourth season finale episode, "Fire at the Max: Part 2". Screech would return in Saved by the Bell: The New Class, coming on as Mr. Richard Belding's administrative assistant on a work-study program from Cal U, starting with the series' second season, and continuing as a main character in The New Class for the rest of its run.

A.C. Slater and Jessie Spano from the original series, became main characters in the 2020 Saved by the Bell sequel series, while Zack, Kelly, and Lisa all would make guest appearances on the show. The 2020 sequel series also revisited The College Years by creating a flashback scene with Jessie visiting Slater at his dorm.

== Critical reception ==
Saved By the Bell: The College Years had a largely negative review from the media. It was cancelled after only 1 season due to many reasons. Executive Producer, Peter Engel, cites the biggest issue being that he did not bring the original six main characters to college, making it hard for viewers to connect with the story lines.

Currently, the season has a 9% rating on Rotten Tomatoes. In 2008, Time Magazine listed it as one of its Top 10 Worst TV Spinoffs.
