= Zack Morris (Saved by the Bell) =

- First appearance: "Summer Love" (Good Morning, Miss Bliss), 1988
- Last appearance: "Let the Games Begin" (Saved by the Bell), 2021
- Created by: Sam Bobrick
- Portrayed by: Mark-Paul Gosselaar

In-universe information
- Gender: Male
- Occupation: Student
- Family: Melanie Rhonda Morris (mother); Derek Morris (father); Peter Morris (single father in Good Morning, Miss Bliss)
- Spouse: Kelly Kapowski (m. 1994)
- Children: Mac Morris

Zachary "Zack" Morris is a fictional character from the sitcoms Good Morning, Miss Bliss; Saved by the Bell; and Saved by the Bell: The College Years. He also makes a guest appearance in the spin-off series Saved by the Bell: The New Class. He is portrayed by Mark-Paul Gosselaar. Though the character appeared in several different television programs, Gosselaar made an effort to keep the character fundamentally the same through its various incarnations. Zack also appears as a recurring character in the 2020 Saved by the Bell series.

As the protagonist of the original Saved by the Bell, Zack Morris ended up becoming one of the most iconic characters in 1990s sitcoms.

== Junior high and Good Morning, Miss Bliss ==
Set in a different continuity from the later series, Good Morning, Miss Bliss took place during Zack's eighth grade year at John F. Kennedy Junior High School in Indianapolis, Indiana. Screech and Lisa are two of Zack's friends in these episodes. Other friends that are regularly featured are Mikey Gonzalez, a close friend who is often involved in Zack's scheming, and Nikki Coleman, who often butts heads with Zack on many issues. His best friend Mikey is a good student and is often supportive of him, and helps him with schoolwork a lot. Mr. Belding was the principal of JFK Junior High, and he often had to deal with problems Zack had caused. Zack's homeroom teacher and history teacher, Miss Carrie Bliss, also acts as a moral compass for Zack. In this series, Zack is already doing much of the scheming, betting, and manipulation for which he became known in the later series.

== High school and college years ==
=== Academics ===
Zack demonstrates a flair for business throughout his teen years. However, in many subjects, notably history and literature, he is often seen receiving poor grades or displaying a lack of interest. Zack is the school troublemaker and breaks the fourth wall often. Despite this, Zack achieves a very high score of 1502 on his SAT and gets accepted to Yale in his senior year. At the end of Saved by the Bell, Zack is planning on going to Yale. However, in Saved by the Bell: The College Years, we see Zack attending Cal U, along with Screech, Slater (who had originally planned on attending Iowa to join their wrestling program), and later on, Kelly, who joined the cast after the pilot episode. Their dorm was a suite, with the three guys in one room, three girls in another room and a common area in-between. The girls originally assigned to share the suite with them were Alex Tabor, an aspiring actress, Leslie Burke, the daughter of a major university donor and Danielle Marks, the daughter of a federal judge.

Danielle quickly transfers to a different school, allowing Kelly to move in after she is accepted into California University and put on the waiting list. Assigned to watch over Zack and his friends was Mike Rogers, a former football player for the San Francisco 49ers. He works as a resident adviser, while also working towards a graduate degree. Mike often steps in to keep Zack in line, while committing various cunning schemes reminiscent of the ones he concocted in high school. Other university faculty and staff that were regularly featured in "Saved by the Bell: The College Years" were Professor Jeremiah Lasky and Dean Susan McMann. Zack generally gets along well with Professor Lasky, with the exception of a short period where Professor Lasky dates Kelly, which upsets Zack because it makes him realize he still had feelings for her. Dean McMann, however, is a more authoritative figure for whom Zack often causes problems.

=== Extracurricular activities ===
When Zack attended Bayside, he was a very involved student. Athletically, Zack participated in cross country, basketball, and track. He experienced some success in each of these sports. In ninth grade, Zack finished in third place at a cross country meet. He was one of Bayside's better basketball players, and it challenged the team when he sprained his knee in the locker room before a big game. When Zack was possibly not going to compete in a track meet, Mr. Belding and Zack's team members became discouraged because they thought there was no way they could win without Zack.

Zack is also musically talented. He offered to play for free at a school dance so that more money could be spent on decorations. This line-up featured Zack as a main vocalist while playing guitar, Jessie as a featured vocalist, Lisa on bass guitar, Screech on keyboard, and Slater on drums. However, when Slater had to take over the lead vocals during the dance because Zack was outside talking to Kelly, when they broke up Ollie (a minor character on Saved by the Bell) took over on drums. Zack was also the lead singer of a 1950s-style doo-wop group, The Five Aces (a reference to the real-life group The Four Aces), that sang during a school sock hop. The other singers were Slater, Screech, Lisa, and Tori Scott, a student who transferred to Bayside during their senior year. He was also a member of the glee club for a short time.

Zack was also involved in various other activities throughout high school. He helped restart the school radio station, and hosted a radio-thon to save the local teen hangout. He created a carnival to raise money for a school ski trip, and helped with several dances. He was also a member of the school's Junior ROTC program, and together with Screech, ran the Yearbook committee to produce a video yearbook. At one point, Zack took over as manager of the school store, and is also on the student council.

== Adult years ==
As an adult, Zack is the Governor of California. In the first episode of the 2020 series, it is revealed that Zack ran for Governor in order to avoid paying for a $75 parking ticket. He is now also married to Kelly and has a son named Mac Morris, who attends the same Bayside high school Zack and Kelly are alumni of.

== Breaking the fourth wall ==
In Saved by the Bell, Zack breaks the fourth wall on numerous occasions. During many episodes, he would introduce the episode or express his opinion on different topics, such as Slater, Kelly, etc. Usually, when he is notably worried about something, Zack says "Time Out" and makes a motion with his hands similar to a basketball player requesting a time out from the referee, and everyone around him freezes. Immediately after, Zack usually offers his opinion, and says "Time In!" when he is finished, and the episode continues.

In "Video Yearbook," Zack uses his ability to stop time to alter the immediate future, when he "Times-Out", to avoid getting punched by Slater. Slater instead punches Mr. Belding because Zack moves out of the room; yet, surprisingly, none of the characters seem to notice when Zack suddenly disappears. When he "Times-Out" in this instance, he also places a piece of paper between the lips of Kelly and a boy she is pretending to kiss.

In another episode, "Glee Club," Zack stops time to give Screech a cassette tape during a performance he was giving with the school choir. His power is able to selectively keep Screech unfrozen, much like Evie Garland's (from the television show Out of This World) ability to freeze and unfreeze time with hand gestures and selectively unfreeze individuals by tagging them.

== Other appearances ==
On June 8, 2009, Gosselaar appeared on Late Night with Jimmy Fallon, as part of Fallon's long-running effort to reunite the cast of Saved by the Bell on his show in character as Zack Morris. In the interview, Zack explains that he relocated to Los Angeles and became an actor, assuming the stage name "Mark-Paul Gosselaar" because there was another Zack Morris already registered with the Screen Actors Guild. His marriage to Kelly also failed when she "moved to a different ZIP code" but that they remained on good terms. Zack engaged in several of his trademark bits such as calling "time out".

On November 6, 2016, Gosselaar voiced an animated version of Zack in the Family Guy episode "Chris Has Got a Date, Date, Date, Date, Date", parodying the scene in "Jessie's Song," where Jessie takes prescription drugs to stay awake for a performance.

== Critical reception ==
Despite his iconic status, Zack has been proven to be a negative and unpleasant character. Some critics have observed that Zack regularly displays traits of sociopathy. Comic Book Resources lists off ten of his worst antics, with number one taking place in the episode "Jessie's Song," where Cassidy Stephenson writer noted, "Zack ignores Slater until he finds Jessie passed out and confused on her bed. Ignoring a friend's safety makes Zack a horrible person," in regards of him ignoring Jessie's addiction to Caffeine pills at first. Similarly, Reid McCarter of The A.V. Club noted some instances of Zack being immoral, citing the time he fakes A.C. Slater having a terminal illness, and when he tried to sell calendars of underaged Kelly, Jessie, and Lisa in swimsuits.

However, Tim Gerstenberger from TV Overmind praised some of his schemes, such as the aforementioned calendar of his female classmates in swimsuits. He was also named as the third-best character in the show by Ciara Knight at Her.ie, with his mobile phone jokingly being named as the number one best character. Knight stated "He was the charming protagonist that invited you into his charmed life, complete with high school drama and comically bad background actors during freeze frames. He made breaking the fourth wall cool and Frank Underwood sure as shit knows it." In a similar list, Zack was also named as the third-best character by Aya Tsintziras from Screen Rant, whom reasoned "Zack is one of the show's better characters since he has a friendly, social, and cheeky personality and that makes his scenes fun to watch." In another article by Screen Rant, Amanda Bruce listed nine instances where Zack was actually a good friend, with Zack not letting Jessie sing due to her addiction in the aforementioned "Jessie's Song" being number one.

Starting in October 2017, the character of Zack Morris has been the subject of a popular multi-season tongue-in-cheek critique by the Funny Or Die web series entitled Zack Morris is Trash. The series is freely available on YouTube.

As of 2022, Gosselaar has grown disdain for the Zack Morris character. Gosselaar stated "I hate [watching myself]," and compared his character to the characters from the 2020 series, saying "God, they're so much more fucking talented than I ever was back then, like why did my career go the way it did from that?" Additionally, Gosselaar dislikes the episode "Running Zack," due to its insensitive nature; Gosselaar stated, "I cringed seeing myself portraying a white dude being Zack Morris, who is like the all-American, blonde-haired white dude in an Indian Native American headdress."
