= Saved by the Bell =

American television sitcom (1989–1993)

- Genre: Teen sitcom
- Created by: Sam Bobrick
- Starring: Mark-Paul Gosselaar; Mario Lopez; Dustin Diamond; Tiffani-Amber Thiessen; Elizabeth Berkley; Lark Voorhies; Ed Alonzo; Dennis Haskins; Leanna Creel
- Theme music composer: Scott Gale
- Country of origin: United States
- Original language: English
- No. of seasons: 4
- No. of episodes: 86 (list of episodes)

Production
- Executive producer: Peter Engel
- Camera setup: Videotape; Multi-camera
- Running time: 22–24 minutes
- Production companies: Peter Engel Productions; NBC Productions

Original release
- Network: NBC
- Release: August 20, 1989 – May 22, 1993

Related
- Good Morning, Miss Bliss; Saved by the Bell: The College Years; Saved by the Bell: The New Class; Saved by the Bell (2020–2021)

Saved by the Bell is an American television teen sitcom created by Sam Bobrick for NBC. The series was produced by Peter Engel Productions and NBC Productions and aired from August 20, 1989 to May 22, 1993. Targeted at kids and teens, Saved by the Bell was broadcast in the United States on Saturday mornings, later as the flagship series in NBC's TNBC lineup. A reboot of the Disney Channel series Good Morning, Miss Bliss, the show follows a group of high school friends and their principal at the fictional Bayside High School in Los Angeles. Primarily focusing on lighthearted comedic situations, it occasionally touches on serious social issues, such as drug use, driving under the influence, homelessness, remarriage, death, women's rights, and environmental issues. The series starred Mark-Paul Gosselaar, Dustin Diamond, Lark Voorhies, Dennis Haskins, Tiffani-Amber Thiessen, Elizabeth Berkley, and Mario Lopez.

The show spawned two spin-off series: Saved by the Bell: The College Years (1993–1994), a primetime series that follows several of the characters to college, and Saved by the Bell: The New Class (1993–2000), a Saturday morning series that follows a new group of students at Bayside High School. The series also spawned two TV movies, Saved by the Bell: Hawaiian Style in 1992 and Saved by the Bell: Wedding in Las Vegas in 1994.

In later years, Saved by the Bell has been classified as educational and informational. The show was named one of the "20 Best School Shows of all Time" by AOL TV.

== Characters ==
In casting Good Morning, Miss Bliss, Peter Engel knew the success of the show would not hinge on Miss Bliss herself, but on her students. Engel particularly envisioned one character, Zack Morris, who "would be that incorrigible kid who could lie to your face, letting you know very well that he's lying, and make you love him for it all the same." Engel insisted that the show could not go on without Zack Morris, but he turned out to be one of the most difficult characters to cast. Engel's casting director, Shana Landsburg, finally happened across fourteen-year old Mark-Paul Gosselaar and was immediately struck by the teen's charisma, charm, and good looks. After a quick read-through, Gosselaar was immediately given the role.

After casting Zack Morris, the next character sought after was Morris's nerdy friend, Samuel "Screech" Powers. Gosselaar was asked to read through the script with a number of kids, and a second audition was scheduled for finalists. It was Gosselaar himself who insisted that Dustin Diamond was right for the part as he believed Diamond was Screech in real life. After reading through the script, Diamond was given the part, although Engel later found out that he had misread his head shot and Diamond was considerably younger than the rest of the cast—a fact that, had he been aware, might have prevented Engel from casting him.

Lisa Turtle was originally conceived as a rich Jewish princess from Long Island, spoiled, materialistic, and obsessed with shopping. While still casting for the role, actress Lark Voorhies was brought into Engel's office, and he immediately knew she was perfect for the role despite the fact that it meant rewriting the character.

The principal, Mr. Gerald Belding, as originally conceived on Good Morning, Miss Bliss, was an older, humorless man, and was played in the 1987 pilot by character actor Oliver Clark. After the show was retooled for Disney Channel, the character's first name was changed to Richard and he was recast, with Dennis Haskins ultimately winning the role. Mr. Belding was rewritten to be significantly younger and to have a much different sense of humor.

When Good Morning, Miss Bliss was retooled as Saved by the Bell, four actors and their respective characters from the original series were brought over to the new series: Gosselaar, Diamond, Voorhies, and Haskins. The rest of the cast was fired, and Engel sought to replace them with new characters who would complement the old ones.

The characters of Saved by the Bell, clockwise from left: Screech, Slater, Lisa, Mr. Belding, Jessie, Zack, and Kelly

The first of the new characters, A.C. Slater, was conceived as a young John Travolta type who would be an army brat and wear a leather jacket. He was originally conceived of as Italian-American. However, when all efforts to cast the character were unsuccessful, Engel asked that the part be opened up to other ethnicities. Two days later, Mario Lopez, a dancer and drummer of Latino descent from Kids Incorporated, auditioned for the role. Lopez was judged the best actor who auditioned, and was cast.

For Kelly Kapowski, the love interest of both Zack and Slater, producers were able to narrow the field down to three actresses: Tiffani-Amber Thiessen, Elizabeth Berkley, and Thiessen's future Beverly Hills, 90210 co-star, Jennie Garth. Engel had originally met Thiessen in 1988 while casting for Good Morning, Miss Bliss and was impressed with how much her acting had improved. He wanted her for the role, believing she had the perfect all-American girl appeal for the role, while others felt that Berkley, as the more experienced actress, would be a more reliable choice. Ultimately, Engel convinced the others after a read-through with Lopez, and Thiessen received the role.

Engel and the other producers did not want to lose Berkley, however, as she was the strongest actress they had seen during casting. Berkley originally auditioned for the role of Karen, a love-interest of Zack's on Good Morning, Miss Bliss, but lost the role because she was so much taller than Gosselaar at the time. Engel believed that, now that her height was more even with the rest of the cast, she could be perfect. They were not having much luck in casting the third new character, Jessie Spano, who was conceived as a strong, feminist activist and a straight-A student, so Engel suggested offering the role to Berkley, who gladly accepted it.

Rounding out the new cast was real-life magician Ed Alonzo as Max, the owner of the gang's frequent cafe hangout, The Max, who frequently performed magic tricks. Alonzo's role, however, would ultimately only last through the end of the first season, and he left after a single guest appearance during season two.

In 1992, Saved by the Bell unexpectedly received an order for an additional eleven episodes to be shot after the graduation episode. However, Thiessen and Berkley had already decided to leave the show. Though producers knew they could not replace Kelly and Jessie, they also knew they could not leave Lisa as the only girl on the show. A new character, Tori Scott, was created as a cool but pretty biker girl who would also serve as a love interest for Zack and also act as a nemesis for him initially. Leanna Creel was cast for the part. Rather than develop a second new character, the producers decided to rely more on minor recurring characters such as Ginger, Ox, and Big Pete.

== Production ==
=== Good Morning, Miss Bliss ===
In 1986, Brandon Tartikoff, then-president of NBC, asked Peter Engel to develop the pilot for a new prime time series, Good Morning, Miss Bliss. Tartikoff had been inspired by his sixth grade teacher, Miss Bliss, and had long wanted to make a show about someone like her. The series would focus on Miss Carrie Bliss, a recently married sixth grade teacher at the fictional John F. Kennedy Junior High School in Indianapolis. Though Sandy Duncan was originally considered for the titular role, the series ultimately became a vehicle for British former child star Hayley Mills. Veteran writer Sam Bobrick was brought on to write the episode and the cast included future stars Jonathan Brandis, Brian Austin Green, and Jaleel White.

The pilot aired on June 11, 1987, but NBC had decided not to pick up the series even before it was shown. Tartikoff did not want to give up on the show, though, and made a deal with the Disney Channel to air thirteen episodes of the series in prime time. If the initial order did well, Disney was prepared to order an additional seventy-seven. The show was completely retooled, with Mills the sole remaining cast member from the pilot. Miss Bliss's class was changed from the sixth grade to the eighth grade, and the kids would be more central to the story.

Good Morning, Miss Bliss aired from 1988 to 1989. However, the show failed to pick up a following and did poorly in the ratings. By the time the last episode aired, Disney had already decided against ordering more.

=== Saved by the Bell ===
Tartikoff felt there had been strong elements to Good Morning, Miss Bliss and wanted to try the show again with a different time slot and a different approach. The elements featuring the kids had been well-received, so Tartikoff wanted to drop Miss Bliss from the show altogether and focus entirely on the teens. NBC had been losing the high end of their animated audience, kids from ten to twelve, so the idea was to create a live action comedy to air on Saturday mornings, a new idea at the time.

Engel was skeptical of the new format at first, and did not want to make children's programming. However, his wife convinced him that making the show would be a worthwhile endeavor, and he soon told Tartikoff he would do the show. Engel felt, however, that Indianapolis was not exciting as a location, and moved the show to a fictionalized version of a Los Angeles neighborhood, "the Palisades." The main locations of the show would be the teenagers' school, Bayside High, and The Max, a fictional eatery they frequent. In addition, they would film before a live studio audience.

The majority of the cast was replaced, and Tartikoff gave a seven-episode commitment for the show. In a meeting with Engel and Tartikoff, senior producer Tom Tenowich suggested the name Saved by the Bell. Though Engel hated the name, Tartikoff loved it. The name stuck, and filming commenced, with the first episode, "Dancing to the Max," airing in prime time on August 20, 1989.

== Episodes ==
Season / Series	Episodes	Originally released		
Season / Series	Episodes	First released	Last released	Network
Good Morning, Miss Bliss	Pilot	July 11, 1987		NBC
Good Morning, Miss Bliss	13	November 30, 1988	March 18, 1989	Disney Channel
Season 1	16	August 20, 1989	December 16, 1989	NBC
Season 2	18	September 8, 1990	December 23, 1990	NBC
Season 3	26	September 14, 1991	December 21, 1991	NBC
Season 4	26	September 12, 1992	May 22, 1993	NBC
Hawaiian Style		November 27, 1992		NBC
The College Years	19	May 22, 1993	February 8, 1994	NBC
Wedding in Las Vegas		October 7, 1994		NBC

== Theme song ==
The theme song for Saved by the Bell was written by composer Scott Gayle against the implicit instructions of Engel. Though Engel had not been able to keep the show from being named Saved by the Bell, he was determined to prevent the phrase from showing up in the theme. He gave explicit orders to his team of composers that he would not accept any theme that referenced the title, and the group agreed to leave out the phrase.

A week later, Engel listened to the first four composers and, though they followed his instructions, the songs were flat and nothing special. Gayle played his song next and, though he explicitly violated Engel's instructions, Engel couldn't help but admit it was the best and perfect for the show. Engel would later comment that he was glad Gayle had not followed his instructions.

== Films ==
=== Saved by the Bell: Hawaiian Style ===
In 1992, NBC approved the production of a feature-length made-for-television Saved by the Bell film to air in prime time. Titled Saved by the Bell: Hawaiian Style, the film followed the six teenagers from the show as they vacationed in Hawaii with Kelly's grandfather, Harry Bannister (Dean Jones). They soon discover Mr. Belding also happens to be there, and the seven are caught up in a plan to save Harry's resort from a greedy developer.

The film was written by Bennet Tramer and directed by Don Barnhart. Due to budget constraints, much of the film was shot in Santa Monica, with only location shots that could not easily be faked shot in Hawaii. The shooting schedule in Hawaii turned out to be massive, even after Engel and Barnhart scouted the location. Real-life lifeguards were hired as extras during beach scenes to ensure the safety of the cast.

Variety said, "The Clearasil demo will eat it up, older viewers may choke on the realization that Dean Jones is old enough to be a grandfather." Saved by the Bell: Hawaiian Style was successful in the ratings, and paved the way for Saved by the Bell: The College Years airing in prime time.

=== Saved by the Bell: Wedding in Las Vegas ===
Following the cancellation of Saved by the Bell: The College Years on a cliffhanger in 1994, NBC President Warren Littlefield commissioned a second film to serve as a series finale for both Saved by the Bell: The College Years and the original show. The story features Zack, Kelly, Slater, Screech, and Lisa traveling to Las Vegas so Zack and Kelly can elope after their parents disapprove of their impending marriage.

== Home media ==
Lionsgate Home Entertainment released all four seasons of Saved by the Bell, which contains 86 episodes, broken into five seasons (season 4 split in two) on DVD in Region 1. However, the episodes on these and all subsequent releases are the edited versions as used in syndication, with scenes cut for time. Lionsgate released the two feature-length TV movies on DVD, in Region 1, on August 7, 2007. On March 13, 2012, Lionsgate (distributed by Alliance Films) released Saved by the Bell: The Complete Collection on DVD in Canada. The 13-disc set features all 86 episodes of the series as well as the two television films.

On November 5, 2013, Lionsgate released a complete-series set in the United States. It does not contain the reunion movies but does include some bonus commentaries.

On October 16, 2018, Shout! Factory re-released the complete series on DVD in Region 1. Unlike the previous releases, the set includes season four in its entirety, rather than having it being broken up into two parts. Bonus features include selected episodes commentaries by pop culture historian Russell Dyball, executive producer Peter Engel, and cast members Dustin Diamond, Dennis Haskins, and Lark Voorhies.

In Region 2, Fabulous Films has released all 5 seasons on DVD in the UK.

Contender Entertainment Group released the 2 reunion tele-films on DVD in the UK in 2004.

In Region 4, Shock Entertainment released Season One on DVD in Australia on February 10, 2010.

DVD name	Ep #	Region 1	Special Features
Saved by the Bell: Seasons One & Two	33	September 2, 2003	None
Saved by the Bell: Seasons Three & Four	29	April 27, 2004	Selected episodes commentaries
Saved by the Bell: Season Five	24	July 19, 2005	In-depth documentary focusing on the series phenomenon
Saved by the Bell: Hawaiian Style/Wedding in Las Vegas	2	August 7, 2007	None
Saved by the Bell: The Complete Collection (Canada)	88	March 13, 2012	Selected episodes commentaries; In-depth documentary focusing on the series phenomenon; The two Saved by the Bell movies
Saved by the Bell: The Complete Series (U.S.)	86	November 5, 2013	Saturday Morning: from toons to teens; It's Alright: Back to the Bell; Selected episodes commentaries; In-depth documentary focusing on the series phenomenon

DVD name	Ep #	Region 2 (UK)	Special Features
Hawaiian Style	Film	May 17, 2004	Behind the Scenes
Wedding in Las Vegas	Film	May 17, 2004	Behind the Scenes
Season One	16	March 20, 2010	
Season Two	18	October 1, 2012	
Season Three	26	October 1, 2012	
Season Four	26	October 1, 2012	
Complete Series	86	July 2, 2012	

== Spin-offs ==
The show was popular enough to justify two spin-offs, both of which premiered in 1993.

=== Saved by the Bell: The College Years ===
Following the conclusion of Saved by the Bell, an idea came out of a focus group for Saved by the Bell: The College Years, in addition to creating a new cast of characters, to continue the story of the original Saved by the Bell cast. The new show aired in prime time and feature only Zack, Slater, and Screech from the original cast attending the fictional California University and living in a suite with a new cast of girls. Kelly later joined the cast after the pilot.

Although the premiere garnered decent viewership, ratings quickly declined against the competition of Full House and Rescue 911, two well-established, popular shows in prime time. Saved by the Bell: The College Years was ultimately cancelled after only one season of nineteen episodes. The events of the final episode would lead directly into the second Saved by the Bell film: Saved by the Bell: Wedding in Las Vegas.

=== Saved by the Bell: The New Class ===
In 1993, NBC decided it wanted to extend the Saved by the Bell franchise with a new show, Saved by the Bell: The New Class. Also set at Bayside, the show would follow a new cast of characters as they navigate their high school years. Reprising his role from the original series was Dennis Haskins, once again as their principal, Mr. Belding. Following the cancellation of Saved by the Bell: The College Years in 1994, Peter Engel asked Dustin Diamond to reprise his role as Samuel "Screech" Powers, who was returning to Bayside on a work-study program as Mr. Belding's administrative assistant.

Saved by the Bell: The New Class ran for seven seasons and 143 episodes, from 1993 to 2000. The cast was constantly revolving, with Haskins as the only constant throughout all seven seasons. The show was not generally well-received, and some believe that it failed to recapture the charm of the original series.

== Reunions ==
On April 9, 2006, Cartoon Network's Adult Swim announced that Saved by the Bell would air at midnight as a two-week special starting April 17. On April 19, 2006, Adult Swim also posted on their website that Saved by the Bell was back in production. A week later, the announcement was exposed as a joke.

On March 27, 2009, NBC's Late Night with Jimmy Fallon launched a campaign to get the cast on board for a Saved by the Bell reunion. Fans signed an online petition and pledged their support for the cast to reunite on the show. Dennis Haskins, Lark Voorhies, Mario Lopez, Elizabeth Berkley, and Mark-Paul Gosselaar agreed to a reunion. Gosselaar reprised his role as Zack Morris in a skit on Late Night on June 8, 2009, while promoting his then current TNT drama, Raising the Bar. The spoof interview closed with a performance of "Friends Forever," originally by Zack Attack, where Zack played guitar and sang with backing from Fallon's house band, The Roots. Tiffani Thiessen posted a parody video to the website Funny or Die, where she claimed she was too busy to join the reunion.

The cast reunited in August 2009 for a photo shoot in People. Diamond was not invited to participate in the photo shoot because of poor relationships with the rest of the cast. Diamond's image was also edited out of the 1989 cast photo that was used on the cover inset of an issue of People to show how the cast looked 20 years later.

The cast convened again when Haskins, Diamond, Gosselaar, Voorhies, and Lopez did their own voices in a Saved by the Bell Saw parody, called "Sawed by the Bell", on "Boo Cocky", a season three episode of Robot Chicken. Gosselaar also provided audio commentary for the episode on the DVD.

On February 4, 2015, the cast appeared on a skit on The Tonight Show Starring Jimmy Fallon. Haskins, Gosselaar, Lopez, Berkley and Thiessen all participated, though Voorhies and Diamond did not, with Thiessen's real-life pregnancy, Lopez's involvement with Dancing with the Stars and Berkley's film Showgirls the targets of some of the humor.

== Revival ==
On September 17, 2019, it was announced that a single-camera revival of the series was in development for NBC's planned streaming service, Peacock, with Tracey Wigfield serving as showrunner. The series will center around a new group of Bayside High students from "overprivileged" and working-class families, among the latter of which were transferred to the school as part of a plan by now-California Governor Zack Morris—whose administration experiences controversy for closing too many low-income high schools—to send lower-income students to the highest-performing schools in the state.

Berkley and Lopez were initially announced as the only cast members of the original series to be reprising their roles, though by January 2020, it was confirmed that Mark-Paul Gosselaar (who was confirmed to appear in three episodes of the revival series' first season as well as receive an executive producer credit) and Tiffani Thiessen—both of whom were confirmed by Gosselaar in separate September 2019 interviews with Variety and TMZ to have not been initially approached to reprise their characters—would also be returning in some capacity; however, it was unclear as to which of the other cast members would return. Lark Voorhies reprised her role as Lisa Turtle for one episode and Ed Alonzo also returned as Max. Other actors confirmed to appear as new characters in the series are John Michael Higgins (as Principal Toddman, who took over Mr. Belding's role as the head of Bayside High) and Josie Totah (as Lexi, described as a "beautiful, sharp-tongued cheerleader and the most popular girl at Bayside High who is both admired and feared by her fellow students").

== Other media ==
=== Soundtrack ===
Saved by the Bell: Soundtrack to the Original Hit TV Series

Soundtrack album by Various artists
- Released: April 11, 1995
- Recorded: 1989–1992
- Genre: Rock/Pop

A CD and cassette tape soundtrack was released on April 11, 1995. It contained songs used throughout the series. The track listing is as follows:

1. "Saved by the Bell"
2. "Don't Leave with Your Love"
3. "Go for It!"
4. "Love Me Now"
5. "Make My Day"
6. "Friends Forever"
7. "Did We Ever Have a Chance?"
8. "Deep Within My Heart"
9. "Surfer Dude"
10. "Gone Hawaiian"
11. "School Song"
12. "Saved by the Bell" with Michael Damian

=== List of Saved by the Bell novels ===
There have been 22 standalone novels based on the show, all written by Beth Cruise (a pseudonym used by the American author Beth Henderson). The first 16 were published by Collier Books in the USA, a Macmillan imprint. The final 6 were published by Aladdin Paperbacks, a Simon & Schuster imprint. All 22 novels were later republished by Boxtree Ltd in the UK. The books all feature the main cast, and have storylines that relate to (but often differ from and expand) the main plots in the TV shows. The list below is given in the order provided by the original publishers (Collier and then Aladdin), although this is not strictly the order in which the books were first published: by the time Bayside Madness was released in 1993, for instance, at least five other titles had already been published the previous year. Collier Books only introduced a numbered order (including numbers on front covers) with book 12, Computer Confusion, in 1994. Boxtree added numbers to its front covers at least as early as book 10, Kelly's Hero, which it published in 1995.

No.	Title	Original Publisher	Release date(s)	Related Episode
1	Bayside Madness	Collier Books	1993	S4E2: "Student-Teacher Week" (Sept 12, 1992)
2	Zack Strikes Back	Collier Books	1992	
3	California Scheming	Collier Books	1993	
4	Girls' Night Out	Collier Books	1992	
5	Zack's Last Scam	Collier Books	1992	
6	Class Trip Chaos	Collier Books	1992	
7	That Old Zack Magic	Collier Books	1993	
8	Impeach Screech	Collier Books	1993	
9	One Wild Weekend	Collier Books	1992	
10	Kelly's Hero	Collier Books	1993	
11	Don't Tell a Soul	Collier Books	1994	
12	Computer Confusion	Collier Books	1994	
13	Silver Spurs	Collier Books	1994	
14	Best Friend's Girl	Collier Books	1994	
15	Zack in Action	Collier Books	1994	
16	Operation Clean Sweep	Collier Books	1994	
17	Scene One, Take Two	Aladdin Paperbacks	1995	
18	Fireside Manners	Aladdin Paperbacks		
19	Picture Perfect	Aladdin Paperbacks		
20	Surf's Up!	Aladdin Paperbacks	August 1995	
21	Screech in Love	Aladdin Paperbacks	1995	
22	Ex-Zack-Ly	Aladdin Paperbacks	December 1995	

Several unofficial books relating to the show have also been published.

Title	Writer	ISBN	Publisher	Release date(s)
"Behind the Scenes at 'Saved by the Bell': An inside Look at TV's Hottest Teen Show"	Beth Cruise	ISBN 0020427786	Prentice Hall & IBD	15 February 1993
"Super Saved by the Bell Scrapbook"	Beth Goodman	ISBN 0590471686	Scholastic Trade	1 May 1993
"Saved by the Bell: Ring Out the Old, Ring in the New Scrapbook"	Nancy E. Krulik	ISBN 0590480863	Scholastic Paperbacks	1 May 1994
"Saved by the Bell: Guide to Life"	Alan Sepinwall	ISBN 076244326X	Running Press, U.S.	9 August 2011
"Saved by the Bell: 30 Years of Miss Bliss, Belding, Bayside, The Max and More"	Kirk Cunningham	ISBN 1543270239	CreateSpace Paperback	21 February 2017

=== Comic books ===
In 1992, Harvey Comics published a short-lived Saved by the Bell Comic series. Seven issues were released, including a Christmas and a Summer special. The comic was generally not well-received, with comic book critic Matt D. Wilson saying "its character likenesses for the show's starts were rough at best."

In 2014, Lion Forge Comics announced that its new all-ages imprint, ROAR Comics, would publish a new Saved by the Bell comic. Set initially during the gang's freshman year of high school, the comic serves as a modern update to the classic series. It premiered in March 2014 alongside ROAR's adaptation of Punky Brewster.

=== Behind the Bell book ===
In 2009, Dustin Diamond published an inside story of the show's cast and crew from his point of view, entitled Behind the Bell. The book paints an unflattering portrait of many of Diamond's colleagues and their alleged backstage behavior. Some of Diamond's claims have been refuted by colleagues and questioned by critics. Diamond also alleges in the book that he had sex with 2,000 women, one of them being NBC's Vice President of children's programming, Linda Mancuso, who was 18 years his senior. Diamond later disclaimed responsibility for much of the book's content, blaming his ghostwriter for fabricating salacious stories.

The Unauthorized Saved by the Bell Story aired on Lifetime on September 1, 2014.

=== Bayside! The Musical! ===
In September 2013, Bayside! The Musical! an unauthorized parody of Saved by the Bell, opened at NYC's Theatre 80. Bayside! The Musical! was named a New York Times Critics' Pick. Bayside! The Musical! was written and directed by Bob and Tobly McSmith, the same creative team behind Showgirls! The Musical! In contrast to the wholesome nature of Saved by the Bell, Bayside! The Musical! contains strong language and adult situations throughout. The show's run has been extended 6 times.

Bayside! originally debuted in 2005 under the title Bayside! The UnMusical! The following year a sequel was produced called Bayside 2! Electric Screechio The show then took several years off, reopening in 2012 at NYC's Kraine Theatre with a revamped script and new cast. Following the success of Showgirls! The Musical! the show's creators Bob and Tobly McSmith revisited their script and reworked it from the ground up.

The show has had appearances from original Saved by the Bell cast members such as Dustin Diamond and Dennis Haskins.

== See also ==
- List of Saved by the Bell episodes
