= List of Saved by the Bell: The New Class episodes =

Saved by the Bell: The New Class is an American teen sitcom that aired on NBC. The program first aired on September 11, 1993, and ran for seven seasons, with its final first-run episode airing on January 8, 2000. Saved by the Bell: The New Class anchored the Saturday morning TNBC lineup during its run.

== Series overview ==
Season	Episodes	Originally released	
Season	Episodes	First released	Last released
1	13	September 11, 1993	December 4, 1993
2	26	September 10, 1994	December 31, 1994
3	26	September 9, 1995	December 9, 1995
4	26	September 7, 1996	December 14, 1996
5	26	September 13, 1997	December 13, 1997
6	13	September 12, 1998	December 5, 1998
7	13	September 11, 1999	January 8, 2000

== Episodes ==
=== Season 1 (1993) ===
The cast for the first season of Saved by the Bell: The New Class was:

- Robert Sutherland Telfer as Scott Erickson
- Isaac Lidsky as Barton "Weasel" Wyzell
- Jonathan Angel as Tommy "D" De Luca
- Bianca Lawson as Megan Jones
- Natalia Cigliuti as Lindsay Warner
- Bonnie Russavage as Vicki Needleman
- Dennis Haskins as Principal Richard Belding

List of Saved by the Bell: The New Class season 1 episodes
No. overall	No. in season	Title	Directed by	Written by	Original release date	Prod. code
1	1	"The Date Lottery"	Don Barnhart	Bennett Tramer	September 11, 1993	101
Scott Erickson transfers into Bayside from Valley and decides that the route to popularity is to make Lindsay his girlfriend, so he gets Weasel to fix a dance raffle for profit, and for a date with Lindsay.
2	2	"The Slumber Party"	Don Barnhart	Robert Jayson & Jeffrey J. Sachs	September 18, 1993	102
Scott dresses up in drag and poses as his cousin "Tina" to crash the girls' slumber party. But it backfires when Crunch falls in love with "Tina". Guest stars: Ryan Hurst as Crunch Grabowski
3	3	"A Kicking Weasel"	Don Barnhart	Carl Kurlander	September 25, 1993	103
Weasel is promoted from football waterboy to kicker; Scott fixes Megan, Lindsay and Vicki's battle for a single varsity cheerleading spot.
4	4	"Home Shopping"	Don Barnhart	Robert Jayson & Jeffrey J. Sachs	October 2, 1993	104
Scott and the gang plot to sell a "memory enhancing drug" before mid-terms as part of their "Bayside Shopping Network" public-access television show.
5	5	"Love is on the Air"	Don Barnhart	Carl Kurlander	October 9, 1993	105
Scott joins the radio station to get into "Babe Hall", just as Weasel creates romance advice master, "Dr. Luv". Absent: Bianca Lawson as Megan Jones
6	6	"George Washington Kissed Here"	Don Barnhart	Bennett Tramer	October 16, 1993	106
The class is going to hold a play on the American Revolution, and Scott wants Lindsay to play Martha to his George, but Tommy D and Vicki have other ideas.
7	7	"Homecoming King"	Don Barnhart	Carl Kurlander	October 23, 1993	107
Once again, it is Homecoming time, and Class President Chad Westerfield who seems to like Megan, and Lindsay are the nominees for King and Queen. Guest stars: Jimmy Marsden as Chad Westerfield, Diane Sainte-Marie as Mrs. Warner
8	8	"Belding's Baby"	Don Barnhart	Brett Dewey & Ronald B. Solomon	October 30, 1993	108
Scott volunteers to babysit Mr. Belding's son Zack, and soon volunteers the child for baby modeling to impress a girl.
9	9	"Good-bye Megan"	Don Barnhart	Robert Jayson & Jeffrey J. Sachs	November 6, 1993	109
Megan's father, Judge Thurston Jones (Richard Lawson), wants her to leave Bayside and enroll at a snooty private school where Stephanie & Tracy attend called Willowbrook Academy. Guest stars: Richard Lawson as Judge Jones
10	10	"Swap Meet"	Don Barnhart	Todd J. Greenwald & Rob Hammersley	November 13, 1993	110
Weasel discovers that he owns a valuable comic book with a rare misprint, but Scott must recover it after it is sold so he can buy concert tickets for a date with Rachel Myers (Sarah Lancaster). Guest stars: Sarah Lancaster as Rachel Myers, Ryan Hurst as Crunch Grabowski Note: This episode marked the first appearance of Rachel Myers.
11	11	"Weasel Love"	Don Barnhart	Story by : Todd J. Greenwald & Rob Hammersley; Teleplay by : Robert Jayson & Jeffrey J. Sachs	November 20, 1993	111
Weasel's pen pal Natalie comes to Bayside and joins the school band, as do Scott and Tommy D in hopes of winning a trip.
12	12	"Tommy A"	Don Barnhart	Bennett Tramer	November 27, 1993	112
Tommy D must get an A in either physics or speech class to get a car from his dad, and the gang does everything in their power to see that he does; a boy causes Megan to act like an air head.
13	13	"Running the Max"	Don Barnhart	Todd J. Greenwald & Rob Hammersley	December 4, 1993	113
The gang takes over the Max for a class project and almost drive it into the ground, until Scott takes over the project, much to Vicki's happiness. Note: This episode marked the final appearance of Scott Erickson, Barton "Weasel" Wyzell, & Vicki Needleman.

=== Season 2 (1994) ===
The cast for the second season of Saved by the Bell: The New Class was:

- Bianca Lawson as Megan Jones
- Jonathan Angel as Tommy "D" De Luca
- Natalia Cigliuti as Lindsay Warner
- Christian Oliver as Brian Keller
- Sarah Lancaster as Rachel Meyers
- Spankee Rodgers as Bobby Wilson
- Dustin Diamond as Screech Powers
- Dennis Haskins as Principal Richard Belding
- Mark-Paul Gosselaar as Zack Morris
- Mario Lopez as A.C. Slater
- Lark Voorhies as Lisa Turtle

List of Saved by the Bell: The New Class season 2 episodes
No. overall	No. in season	Title	Directed by	Written by	Original release date	Prod. code
14	1	"The Return of Screech"	Don Barnhart	Bennett Tramer	September 10, 1994	60761
Former Bayside High pupil and current college student Samuel "Screech" Powers returns to his alma mater as an administrative assistant to Mr. Belding. A new student from Switzerland, Brian Keller, is attracted to Rachel. Rachel ruins her mom's $700 jacket and the gang helps her come up with a plan to replace it, a plan which makes Screech an unwitting participant. Lindsay, Megan, and Rachel all get sentenced to detention for the first time. Note: This episode marks the first appearances of Brian Keller and Bobby Wilson.
15	2	"All Play and No Work"	Don Barnhart	Bennett Tramer	September 10, 1994	202
Mr. Belding and Screech are summer managers at the Palisades Hills Country Club. Screech promptly hires the gang from Bayside to work there for the summer, and they just as promptly incur the wrath of Mr. Harrington, the club's manager. Screech falls for Mr. Harrington's daughter Alison. Guest stars: Frank Bonner as Mr. Edward P. Harrington, Clare Salstrom as Alison Harrington Note: Some season 2 episodes took place not at Bayside High, but at Palisade Hills Country Club, and chronologically were supposed to take place during the summer before the fall classroom episodes at Bayside.
16	3	"Let the Games Begin"	Don Barnhart	Todd J. Greenwald & Rob Hammersley	September 17, 1994	60762
The annual competition pitting the staff of Pacific Palisades Country Club against Mr. Harrington and the guests is coming up. Mr. Belding injures himself, so Screech must take his place in a golf match against Harrington, who is determined to win at all costs. Lindsay and Megan have to teach Tommy D to swim so he can fill a spot on the relay team. Also, Brian has to find a way to convince Rachel to stay at the Club after she learns her college boyfriend, David, won't be coming out for the summer. Guest stars: Frank Bonner as Mr. Edward P. Harrington, Clare Salstrom as Alison Harrington Note: Some season 2 episodes took place not at Bayside High, but at Palisade Hills Country Club, and chronologically were supposed to take place during the summer before the fall classroom episodes at Bayside.
17	4	"Blood Money"	Don Barnhart	Carl Kurlander	September 17, 1994	204
Megan is running a blood drive and while contributing to it, Screech falls for the pretty nurse Penny Brady. Meanwhile, the gang needs to find a chaperone for their camping trip. Brian comes up with a scheme to get Screech to do the job, but first he must get him a date with Nurse Brady.
18	5	"Squash It"	Don Barnhart	Renee Palyo	September 24, 1994	60763
The kids operate a booth at the Bayside Carnival. Bobby is threatened by a bully who likes Megan. For protection, he takes karate lessons from an unlikely teacher—Screech!
19	6	"Brian's Girlfriend"	Don Barnhart	Mark Fink	September 24, 1994	206
In an effort to make Rachel jealous and stop her from thinking about her missing boyfriend David, Brian begins hanging out with the club's pretty tennis instructor, Karen. Also, the Bayside gang competes in a "tip-athon," the winner of which will get double his or her earnings. Guest star: Clare Salstrom as Alison Harrington Note: Some season 2 episodes took place not at Bayside High, but at Palisade Hills Country Club, and chronologically were supposed to take place during the summer before the fall classroom episodes at Bayside.
20	7	"The People's Choice"	Don Barnhart	Trish Baker	October 1, 1994	60764
Screech is looking for more challenging responsibilities, so Mr. Belding makes him faculty adviser for the Bayside Breeze, the school newspaper which needs some livening up. The first big story is about the girls' swim team not being able to go to the tournament finals for lack of money. Screech gives his staff permission to skip Belding's PSAT review and other classes to work on deadline. Mr. Belding has to talk to Screech about him letting students miss so much work. Screech shuts down operations on the paper for a while and leads the PSAT review himself. After the test, the kids trick athletic director Mr. Doyle into admitting how he took money from the girls' swim team for use in other sports.
21	8	"Rachel's Choice"	Don Barnhart	Carl Kurlander	October 1, 1994	208
Rachel's boyfriend from college David arrives at Palisades Hills. Now Rachel must choose between him and Brian. Also, Screech takes on the task of making a promotional video for the Country Club. Note: Some season 2 episodes took place not at Bayside High, but at Palisade Hills Country Club, and chronologically were supposed to take place during the summer before the fall classroom episodes at Bayside.
22	9	"Belding's Prank"	Don Barnhart	Todd J. Greenwald & Rob Hammersley	October 8, 1994	60765
Prank week at Bayside High coincides with a visit from the school's superintendent. Mr. Belding tries to postpone prank week but the students do not listen. When pranks between the boys and girls go too far, Belding's job is placed in jeopardy.
23	10	"A Matter of Trust"	Don Barnhart	Robert Jayson & Jeffrey J. Sachs	October 8, 1994	209
When the Palisades Country Club holds its annual Charity Auction and Picnic, the male staff get auctioned to various women bidders to compete in various events, and the winner gets a hot air balloon ride. Screech gets jealous when Alison "buys" Brian, Megan gets stuck with Bobby, and Rachel ends up buying a nerd. Screech becomes jealous when Alison is teamed with Brian, while Tommy D tries to avoid winning the contest with Lindsay because he is afraid of heights. So, Tommy tries rigging all of Bobby's events, but as usual, everything turns out the wrong way for Tommy. Guest star: Clare Salstrom as Alison Harrington Note: Some season 2 episodes took place not at Bayside High, but at Palisade Hills Country Club, and chronologically were supposed to take place during the summer before the fall classroom episodes at Bayside.
24	11	"Tommy the Tenor"	Don Barnhart	Leslie Eberhard	October 15, 1994	210
Bobby is trying to drum up interest in the glee club. He gets very little response until the girls see the cute music teacher. Meanwhile, it turns out that Tommy D has a great singing voice, but doesn't want anyone to hear him because he's afraid it will hurt his image. Absent: Dustin Diamond as Screech Powers
25	12	"Christmas in July"	Don Barnhart	Leslie Eberhard	October 15, 1994	211
Palisades Hills' annual "Christmas in July" celebration is here, and Screech, Bobby and Tommy D are worried about what gifts they should get for Alison, Mr. Harrington and Mr. Belding, respectively. Megan protests the swimsuit portion of the Snow Queen pageant. Guest stars: Frank Bonner as Mr. Edward P. Harrington, Clare Salstrom as Alison Harrington Note: Some season 2 episodes took place not at Bayside High, but at Palisade Hills Country Club, and chronologically were supposed to take place during the summer before the fall classroom episodes at Bayside.
26	13	"Bayside Story"	Don Barnhart	Carl Kurlander	October 22, 1994	212
It is time for the big game between fierce archrivals Bayside and Valley, and it turns out that Megan's new boyfriend Doug Parker (Bumper Robinson) is the captain of Valley's football team. Absent: Dustin Diamond as Screech Powers
27	14	"Farewell Dance"	Don Barnhart	Robert Jayson & Jeffrey J. Sachs	October 22, 1994	213
As the Farewell Dance approaches at the Country Club, Rachel is sad to be leaving and Megan can't find a date. Bobby wants to date Michelle, a rich club member, so he concocts phony stories about his wealth. Screech faces a dilemma when Alison is accepted at the Juilliard School of Music while he is set to return to Bayside. Guest stars: Frank Bonner as Mr. Edward P. Harrington, Clare Salstrom as Alison Harrington Note: Some season 2 episodes took place not at Bayside High, but at Palisade Hills Country Club, and chronologically were supposed to take place during the summer before the fall classroom episodes at Bayside.
28	15	"A Perfect Lindsay"	Don Barnhart	Robert Jayson & Jeffrey J. Sachs	October 29, 1994	214
Feeling pressure to live up to an idealized standard, Lindsay goes overboard on her dieting, endangering her health. Also, the TV show "Club Jam" is holding a dance contest at Bayside. Brian asks Rachel to be his partner. Brian helps Bobby pair up with Megan, but Bobby has a problem: he can't dance.
29	16	"Back at the Ranch"	Don Barnhart	Todd J. Greenwald & Rob Hammersley	October 29, 1994	215
The gang goes to a dude ranch owned by Screech's uncle Lester. They make friends with his cousin who picked on Screech when they were little. Gold fever hits the gang when they learn about a treasure. Guest stars: Lewis Arquette as Uncle Lester, Bart Johnson as Clint Note: Two season 2 episodes took place not at Bayside High, but at Gold Canyon Ranch, a dude ranch, owned by Screech's uncle Lester; chronologically, these episodes were also supposed to take place during the summer before the season 2 episodes set in Bayside High.
30	17	"Wanna Bet?"	Don Barnhart	Bennett Tramer	November 5, 1994	216
Screech's Uncle leaves the ranch in care of Screech and Belding. Soon Belding and Screech start competing. When they fail, they give each other the silent treatment. The gang befriends two older boys who let them win at everything unaware that they are con artists planning their next scam. Note: Two season 2 episodes took place not at Bayside High, but at Gold Canyon Ranch, a dude ranch, owned by Screech's uncle Lester; chronologically, these episodes were also supposed to take place during the summer before the season 2 episodes set in Bayside High.
31	18	"Breaking Up"	Don Barnhart	Leslie Eberhard	November 12, 1994	217
Lindsay can't afford to buy a birthday present for Tommy, so Brian and Bobby get hold of the school's video equipment so she can make a video for a present. Meanwhile, Brian's sister Katie, and Tommy are falling for each other. Lindsay and Tommy are looking at the end of their relationship. Absent: Dustin Diamond as Screech Powers
32	19	"The Class of 2020"	Don Barnhart	Todd J. Greenwald & Rob Hammersley	November 19, 1994	218
The gang is interviewed for a film to go in a time capsule to be opened by the class of 2020. Stories are told via flashback.
33	20	"Drinking 101"	Don Barnhart	Carl Kurlander	November 19, 1994	219
Mr. Belding leads the kids on a school-sponsored skiing trip. When they get to the lodge, Brian is more interested in hitting the slopes than being with Rachel, and Lindsay meets a college guy she's attracted to. The girls are invited to a frat party, and they go. While there, Lindsay is offered a beer and ends up drinking too much. The boys come looking for the girls and Tommy D starts drinking also. He and a girl he met take off on a snowmobile.
34	21	"Feuding Friends"	Don Barnhart	Leslie Eberhard	November 26, 1994	60772
Still at the ski lodge, Tommy D has time on his hands after his accident, and he and Megan start to spend some together. They go out on a date, which makes Lindsay and Bobby none too happy. Rachel and Brian also get caught up in the feuding that follows. Screech is chosen by Ramon-Ramon to be his new model, but he doesn't realize that the famous skiwear designer intends to make a mockery of him.
35	22	"To Cheat or Not to Cheat"	Don Barnhart	Alan Eisenstock & Larry Mintz	December 3, 1994	60773
Rachel must get a "B" on a test or she can't go to the Bayside Ball with Brian. Brian sees a copy of the test and tells Rachel what she should study. She makes the "B," but now she thinks she doesn't have to work hard for good grades. Also, Mr. Belding is doing a performance evaluation of Screech. Screech enlists the kids to help him look good, but his plans keep backfiring.
36	23	"The D Stands for Dropout"	Don Barnhart	Leslie Eberhard	December 10, 1994	60774
Tommy enjoys his mechanic's job at Vince's garage and he's good at it. Vince offers him regular employment. When school starts preventing Tommy from working at the garage as much as he'd like, he drops out so he can work full-time. It is a decision he comes to regret.
37	24	"Belding's Prize"	Don Barnhart	Robert Jayson & Jeffrey J. Sachs	December 24, 1994	60776
Screech forgets to mail in Mr. Belding's application to join a prestigious society of principals, so he enlists the help of James the actor (Mark Blankfield) to convince Mr. Belding that he's been accepted. Also, the gang tries to buy the one-millionth burger served at the Max so they can win tickets to the MTV Music Awards.
38	25	"Goodbye Bayside"	Don Barnhart	Story by : Todd J. Greenwald & Rob Hammersley; Teleplay by : Robert Jayson & Jeffrey J. Sachs	December 31, 1994	60775
39	26	"Goodbye Bayside"	Don Barnhart	Bennett Tramer	December 31, 1994	60777
Part 1: Bayside's 40th birthday celebration is in full swing. Bobby is running for homecoming "king" against Rachel, who's running for queen. A millionaire alumnus, J. Walter McMillan, comes to tour the school. He plans to buy Bayside and tear it down for condo construction. The gang are all reassigned to different schools. Screech's work program will come to an end and Mr. Belding will be looking for a job. Screech and the kids resolve to stop McMillan. Screech disguises himself as attorneys for both sides and the gang chain themselves to lockers, but nothing works. The school is slated to be destroyed after the prom. Part 2: The students are depressed about Bayside's closing and can't get very excited about the prom. Mr. McMillan shows up and says he now plans to tear down the school even before the prom is held. Desperate to stop him, Rachel is disguised as "Nurse McGillicuddy" and the kids fake an outbreak of "Swiss measles," for which a phony quarantine is set up. The prom is back on. The gang finds out that Mr. McMillan was a lonely guy at Bayside, with only one friend, a girl named Sandy Bennett. They locate Ms. Bennett but she can't come to Bayside's 40th prom because of a previous engagement with her nephew. The prom has a 1959 theme. Former Bayside High students Lisa Turtle and A.C. Slater show up, then Zack Morris arrives with Sandy Bennett, who it turns out is his aunt. McMillan is reunited with his old friend and she convinces him to abandon his plans to tear down Bayside. The episode also features the Bayside school song, which was written by the gang in Season 5 of the original series. Guest stars: Victor Brandt as Mr. McMillan, Aileen Fitzpatrick as Sandy Bennett; Special appearances: Mario Lopez as A.C. Slater, Lark Voorhies as Lisa Turtle, and Mark-Paul Gosselaar as Zack Morris; Note: This episode marked the final appearance of Megan Jones, Brian Keller, & Bobby Wilson

=== Season 3 (1995) ===
The cast for the third season of Saved by the Bell: The New Class was:

- Jonathan Angel as Tommy "D" De Luca
- Natalia Cigliuti as Lindsay Warner
- Sarah Lancaster as Rachel Meyers
- Richard Lee Jackson as Ryan Parker
- Salim Grant as R.J. Collins
- Samantha Esteban as Maria Lopez
- Dustin Diamond as Screech Powers
- Dennis Haskins as Principal Richard Belding

List of Saved by the Bell: The New Class season 3 episodes
No. overall	No. in season	Title	Directed by	Written by	Original release date	Prod. code
40	1	"Welcome to Bayside"	Don Barnhart	Bennett Tramer	September 9, 1995	61301
New transfers to Bayside High from arch-rival Valley High include three students: R.J. "Hollywood" Collins, head cheerleader Maria Lopez, and Ryan Parker, who stole Bayside's mascot the year before. The old gang greatly resents these newcomers. Ryan makes plans to date Lindsay, make Maria the head cheerleader and get R.J. to emcee the Welcome Back dance. The two groups fight so much that Mr. Belding makes them stay on separate sides of the gym at the dance and wear identifying badges. But before the night ends, the enemies all dance with each other. Also, Tommy D. is thinking of how to get back together with his old girlfriend, Lindsay. Notes: This episode marked the first appearances of Ryan Parker, Maria Lopez and R.J. Collins.
41	2	"The Love Bugs"	Don Barnhart	Carl Kurlander	September 9, 1995	302
Maria and the others are trying to win tickets to the Grungefest from the radio station, but Lindsay wins them on her first try! Tommy has told Lindsay that he wants to get back together with her, so she must choose between him and Ryan. The girls hold a slumber party to help Lindsay decide. Tommy borrows some high-tech communication equipment that Screech has bought for the school and he plans to bug Lindsay's room. Ryan has the same idea, though, and he gets R.J. to help. Eventually all the boys end up hiding in Lindsay's closet or under her bed. A few more misunderstandings occur until Lindsay finally decides to go to the show with Maria.
42	3	"Driving School"	Don Barnhart	Jeffrey J. Sachs	September 16, 1995	303
Maria is getting a car for her 16th birthday, but she's failing Driver's Education. She pleads with Screech to pass her, and he agrees against his better judgment. Meanwhile, Ryan needs a car to compete with Tommy for Lindsay. He gets the idea of pooling money to buy one and he recruits Rachel, R.J. and various nerds, jocks and band members to join in with him. When he's still $600 short, he gets a rich kid named Arthur to go in on the deal by using Rachel as bait. Rachel can't stand Arthur and gets mad at the boys for using her. Later, Maria is out driving with her friends when she hits Mr. Belding's parked car. Ryan and the gang use their money to buy an identical car while Mr. B's is being fixed. But the other partners show up and demand to have their turn in the new car. When Mr. Belding shows up and sees all the students piled into what he thinks is his car, he demands to know what's going on. Maria and Screech both own up to their mistakes.
43	4	"What's the Problem?"	Don Barnhart	Leslie Eberhard	September 16, 1995	304
Lindsay is nominated for Homecoming Queen, and so is Maria, even though she really doesn't want it, but she soon becomes competitive. Mr. Belding asks Rachel to help tutor star football player Todd Green (Drew Ebersole) to keep him eligible. Rachel finds that Todd can grasp things she tells him very well, but he has great difficulty reading. An attraction develops between Todd and Rachel. Meanwhile, the Homecoming Queen campaign has gotten heated with Ryan and Tommy working for Lindsay and R.J. becoming Maria's manager. The campaign gets dirty when Maria is accused of being a Valley High "traitor". Todd fails to complete the test he's been studying for. Rachel tells Mr. Belding about Todd's problems – Belding suspects Todd might have a form of dyslexia. Todd is mad at Rachel at first but things get straightened out and Todd passes a verbal makeup test. Lindsay and Maria stop the dirty campaigning and vow that whoever wins will give the crown to the other girl. Who wins? Rachel, as a write-in!
44	5	"Air Screech"	Don Barnhart	Carl Kurlander	September 30, 1995	305
The gang are all working at Palisades Mall; even Screech and Belding are working at Mr. Belding's brother's sporting goods store. Tommy gets an expensive watch as a gift for Lindsay, and Ryan can't afford that kind of competition. R.J. mistakenly spray-paints some athletic shoes at the sporting goods store, but surprisingly, customers like them and want to buy more. Ryan sees the opportunity to make money and soon he has the gang working on making more "Air Screech" sneakers to sell. Ryan makes his move on Lindsay. When Mr. Belding finds out about the "Air Screech" fraud, he finds a way to teach Ryan and the others a lesson. Tommy goes out with Lindsay while Ryan is stuck at the mall in a chicken costume!
45	6	"Big Screech on Campus"	Don Barnhart	Leslie Eberhard	September 30, 1995	306
Screech takes the gang on a tour of his alma mater, Cal U., where it seems his old fraternity brothers aren't very interested in him, but are interested in the girls. One of the frat guys, Michael, make plays for both Maria and Rachel. Tommy, Lindsay and Ryan sit in on a psych class and get hypnotized, which results in Lindsay and Ryan being attracted to R.J. and Rachel, respectively, while Tommy goes for... Mr. Belding! Screech is down about being forgotten by his old buddies, so Ryan concocts a plan to make him popular by pretending that R.J. is a star football recruit. The college guys buy this and try to get R.J. to join their fraternity. When R.J. tells them his hero is Screech, they plan to make Screech fraternity president. Screech is so impressed he wants to quit his Bayside job and return to Cal U. But everything is revealed at a phony ceremony for Screech, including Michael's two-timing of Maria and Rachel.
46	7	"Maria's Movie Star"	Don Barnhart	Jeffrey J. Sachs	October 7, 1995	307
Maria waits on her heartthrob, actor Justin Wells, at the Rockin' Rice Japanese restaurant where she works at the mall. He's gone there hoping to see his new movie with a regular audience. Maria vows to keep his secret and he asks her to go to the movie with him. She and Justin have fun spending the day together — he even works in the restaurant! At the movie that night, Justin kisses Maria. He plans to spend another day with Maria, but Ryan overhears the conversation and arranges a personal appearance for the movie star at the Splash Video store without his approval. When Justin finds out he thinks Maria has betrayed him, but it all gets straightened out. Sadly, Justin departs after receiving a call from his agent, giving Maria one last kiss.
47	8	"Acting Jealous"	Don Barnhart	Leslie Eberhard	October 7, 1995	308
Lindsay and Ryan are celebrating one month together and they can't keep apart. But a problem arises when they audition for Screech's production of the play "Cinderella". Ryan gets the part of the prince, but it is Rachel rather than Lindsay who lands the role of Cinderella. Rachel and Ryan have to take extra rehearsals and Lindsay can't help but be troubled. She suspects a romance is going on behind her back even though Maria tries to set her straight. But later Maria sees Ryan give Rachel a necklace and she reports this back to Lindsay. What the girls don't know is that the necklace is really for Lindsay, not Rachel. Ryan and Rachel have to work on the kissing scene due to their height difference. When Lindsay and Maria see them, they think the worst.
48	9	"Boundaries"	Don Barnhart	Todd J. Greenwald & Rob Hammersley	October 14, 1995	309
Rachel goes on a date with a college boy but feels guilty when she becomes the victim of abuse. Meanwhile, Screech is being pursued by Mabel, a crazy lunch lady who adores him and won't leave him alone.
49	10	"Hollywood, Here He Is"	Don Barnhart	Leslie Eberhard	October 14, 1995	310
Bayside joins the High School Television Network and the gang produces a show with Screech as faculty adviser and director. Unfortunately, the first edition of "Bayside Live" is a disaster. Mr. Belding gives the group one more chance and they come up with a concept based on the show "Tough Copy", which Mr. Belding likes. Meanwhile, R.J. catches the eye of a talent agent, Gavin Malone, who promises to make him a big star. But R.J. is the one forking out the money, giving the agent hundreds of dollars for photos and "expenses". Maria is suspicious of the agent and goes snooping in his office, where she finds that Malone is bilking other clients, too. Meanwhile, Mr. Belding and Screech find out the TV show is planning to fake an earthquake on the air and they pull the plug. Ryan plans to expose the agent – he has R.J. tells Malone that he's dumping him for a new agent, "Hal E. Wood," who is in reality Screech. Malone tells "Wood" that the two should combine their talents to exploit more young clients, with Malone thus revealing himself to be a fraud.
50	11	"Ryan's Worst Nightmare"	Don Barnhart	Carl Kurlander	October 21, 1995	311
The dreaded teacher "Wicked Witch" Hurst is giving one last killer physics test before leaving the school. Tommy breaks a date with Lindsay to study, so Ryan jumps in and takes her out instead. Later he spends half the night talking to her on the phone. The result is that Ryan has done no studying of his own, so he convinces Screech that it is "National Fire Drill Day" in order to get out of taking the test. The sprinkler system goes off and all the Homecoming floats in the gym are ruined. A new teacher, Mrs. Rumplemeyer, takes over the class, and she is even tougher than Miss Hearst. It turns out to be Mr. Belding in drag, trying to teach Ryan a lesson. Ryan works to repair the damaged floats and when Lindsay asks him out, he declines because he has to study.
51	12	"Prom Dates"	Don Barnhart	Jeffrey J. Sachs	October 21, 1995	312
The Prom is coming up and the scramble is on for dates. Lindsay is asked to go by both Tommy and Ryan. Maria is turning down dates, hoping to be asked out by the perfect guy. Rachel hasn't been asked out yet; all the guys think she's unapproachable. R.J. asks pretty and popular Valerie Butler to go, and she surprises him by saying yes. But Carl, Valerie's older (and bigger!) brother, threatens to pound R.J. if he gets out of line with his sister. Lindsay decides to go to the Prom with Tommy and breaks the news to Ryan. But later on a date, it seems to Tommy that all Lindsay wants to talk about is Ryan. Later Tommy overhears Lindsay talking about going to the Prom with Ryan instead. Meanwhile, Screech tries to get someone to ask out Rachel — geeky Fuzzy Hammersley, who faints when he tries to do it. Maria is now desperate for a date; she may have waited too long. When Ryan hears Maria is dateless, he asks her out. Rachel is at home on Prom Night, but Screech arrives in a tux and takes her to the dance. R.J. goes with Valerie and stands up to Carl, who is working at the dance – Carl respects him for it and leaves him alone. Tommy is moody and upset. He tells Lindsay that maybe they should part as a couple but remain friends. Tommy and Maria give Lindsay and Ryan the OK to dance together. Tommy and Maria also dance together.
52	13	"Thomas D."	Don Barnhart	Brett Dewey	October 28, 1995	313
Tommy has fallen for a girl named Nicole, but he's afraid she's too classy and cultured for him. He confides to Rachel that he's trying to write poetry for Nicole. Tommy reads a poem of Rachel's in class and gets an "A". Nicole is impressed, and Tommy makes a date with her — at the opera! Ryan schemes along with R.J. to make Tommy appear cultured, hoping to impress Nicole's father so that they can get Boyz II Men tickets from him (he's the manager of the L.A. Amphitheatre) and take out Lindsay and Maria. Tommy is now nervous about meeting Mr. Miller and feels like a phony. Nicole tells Rachel and Lindsay how cultured "Thomas" is, which causes the girls to bust out laughing. When Nicole finds out from them that Tommy didn't write the poem, she's mad at him for deceiving and using her, and doesn't want to see him. Meanwhile, a school ballet production is called off, disappointing Nicole. Tommy volunteers to dance in the production so Nicole's father can see her perform, and he recruits the others to help. At the show, Screech tearfully dedicates the performance to Mr. Belding, whom he mistakenly thinks is dying! The ballet starts off well enough when the girls perform, but the guys turn it into a disaster when they hit the stage. Nevertheless, Mr. Miller likes the "comic ballet" and gives the kids tickets — to the "Franciscan Follies"!
53	14	"Fear of Falling"	Don Barnhart	Todd J. Greenwald & Rob Hammersley	October 28, 1995	314
The girls' gymnastic team, featuring star performer Lindsay, should be going to the state finals, but they don't have the money, and their coach has quit. Ryan's schemes to pump up attendance and generate money include letting it "slip" on R.J.'s radio show that Michael Jordan will attend the girls' next meet! (Mr. Belding makes Ryan refund the money.) Meanwhile, Lindsay sprains her ankle during practice. When it comes to rehabilitation, she's afraid to put herself through a full workout. Lindsay tells Ryan that she doesn't want to take any risks and she won't compete in the finals. Tommy leads the football players on strike in support of the girls' team. Screech talks to Lindsay and he tries to straighten her out. At the semi-final meet, the stands are full. Maria and Rachel both get excellent scores for their routines, then just in the nick of time, Lindsay arrives in uniform. She scores a "10" in her event. Bayside wins the meet and will go to the state finals.
54	15	"The Principal's Principles"	Don Barnhart	Ronald B. Solomon	November 4, 1995	315
Belding and Tommy switch roles – Tommy is the student "principal", but when he lets everyone goof off, he realizes that being a principal is a serious job.
55	16	"Screech's Millions"	Don Barnhart	Bennet Tramer	November 4, 1995	316
Screech thinks that he has won the lottery.
56	17	"My Best Friends"	Don Barnhart	Todd J. Greenwald & Rob Hammersley	November 11, 1995	317
Rachel feels left out when Lindsay and Maria spend time together without her.
57	18	"Lindsay's Dilemma"	Don Barnhart	Story by : Jeffrey J. Sachs; Teleplay by : Leslie Eberhard & Carl Kurlander	November 11, 1995	318
The gang arrives at Sleepy Mountain ski lodge, run by Screech's grandpa Ernie. Business is very slow at the lodge because of competition from a big new resort, plus there's no snow for skiing. Ryan shows R.J. a charm he plans to give Lindsay during the trip to mark their relationship. Rachel and Maria are too nervous to talk to the lodge's handsome waiter Greg, so Lindsay speaks to him first. They seem to hit it off well. Customers are leaving Ernie's lodge, and even with a busload coming in the next day, he decides it is time to give up and close the business. The kids decide to help Ernie out by being his staff for the rest of their vacation and the lodge stays open. Ryan suggests Lindsay help out in the kitchen, where Greg works. Working closely together, Greg tells Lindsay he's attracted to her; she confesses she feels likewise. They kiss but Lindsay feels guilty. Later, Ryan gives her his gift. The new guests are ready to desert Sleepy Mountain when they hear the competing lodge has a snow machine, but by using fake snow on the windows and barricading the front door, Ryan and the guys fool the guests into thinking they're snowed in, at least until the real snowstorm comes in a couple of days. Lindsay tells the other girls about her dilemma and that she might choose Greg. The guests find out about the snow scam, but the kids plead with them to stay, saying they were doing it all for Ernie. The guests have been so entertained by the kids that they agree to stay and wait for the real snow. A troubled Lindsay tells Ryan about Greg and gives him back his charm. Ryan is hurt and angry. Absent: Jonathan Angel as Tommy "D" De Luca
58	19	"Screech's Dream"	Don Barnhart	Jeffrey J. Sachs & Carl Kurlander	November 18, 1995	319
Screech feels that he's not important until he has a dream about the future that shows how important he is at Bayside.
59	20	"R.J.'s Handicap"	Don Barnhart	Leslie Eberhard	November 18, 1995	320
The gang goes on a class field trip on a cruise. R.J. learns a lesson in respect when he falls for a disabled girl.
60	21	"Casino ID's"	Don Barnhart	Bennett Tramer	November 25, 1995	321
During a semester-at-sea, the gang attempt to get into the ship's casino to gamble.
61	22	"Green Card"	Don Barnhart	Carl Kurlander	November 25, 1995	322
Near the end of the students' "semester at sea," there is a shipboard contest to find $500 in hidden gold coins. Screech is distraught when he receives a "Dear John" letter from his girlfriend Alison. The gang wants to find another woman for Screech to take his mind of his breakup. They convince a beautiful German model named Inga that Screech is an eccentric millionaire and set the couple up on a date. When Screech is giving a description of the size of Bayside High, Inga thinks he's talking about his second house! After the date, Screech comes by the kids' cabin with the news that he and Inga are engaged. After Mr. Belding finds out about the marriage plans, the kids confess their set-up to Inga. Surprisingly, she says she still wants to marry Screech. Belding tries to dissuade Screech from marrying. Inga tells her boyfriend Rolf that she's only marrying Screech to get a green card to work in the U.S. and will divorce him afterward. The gang sees Inga kiss Rolf. They try to tell Screech about it, but he won't listen. Inga claims Rolf is her brother. Screech wants to get married right away and he and Inga go looking for the ship's captain. The kids go to Inga's cabin looking for proof that she's being dishonest and they find an application for a green card and letters from modeling agencies offering her jobs if she can legally work in the U.S. Rolf locks the gang in Inga's room and the wedding ceremony starts without them. Lindsay slides out the porthole and unlocks the door. The gang arrive just in time to stop Screech from saying "I do." He is depressed but bumps into the podium and discovers the hidden gold coins.
62	23	"No Smoking"	Don Barnhart	Jeffrey J. Sachs	December 2, 1995	323
Lindsay and Rachel are helping to organize the fashion show at Palisades Mall, and they hope to model in it also. During a break, they and the rest of the gang are dismayed when Tommy D lights up a cigarette. At the Sweet Tooth, Mr. Belding orders Screech to get rid of the various kinds of trick and novelty candy he's stocked up on. Rachel and Lindsay meet a couple of the models who will be in the show. The girls are disappointed they won't be in it themselves, but Lindsay accepts a cigarette when one of the models offers it. Ryan and R.J. come up with a scheme to get the girls hired on as models for the show. When it works, Lindsay kisses Ryan. He smells the smoke on her, but she says she just bummed the one cigarette from the model. Lindsay continues to smoke and hides it from Ryan. Tommy D. is dropped from an athletic team because of performance difficulties related to his smoking. Screech suggests he try candy as an alternative. When he tries some from the Sweet Tooth, he finds that it is fiery hot, some of the trick candy that should have been gotten rid of, but that the customers have been buying thinking it was real. At the mall's dance club, Lindsay lights up. Everyone gets on her case about it, so she leaves. At a fashion show rehearsal, Lindsay burns an expensive dress and is fired from the show by Mr. Hugo and replaced by Maria. Now she considers breaking up with Ryan, who is critical of her smoking. Lindsay finally quits after she imagines a scene 25 years in the future where the gang recalling her death ten years before. She apologizes to Ryan.
63	24	"The Fallout"	Don Barnhart	Story by : Bennett Tramer; Teleplay by : Todd J. Greenwald & Rob Hammersley	December 2, 1995	324
Lindsay and Ryan break up after Lindsay finds another guy. But Ryan can't take he and Lindsay not being together anymore, so he tries to make Lindsay jealous by giving her old necklace to Sonya. Meanwhile, Screech and Mr. Belding attempt to join the Spotted Hoot Owls.
64	25	"The Christmas Gift"	Don Barnhart	Bennett Tramer	December 9, 1995	325
Tommy helps out a homeless girl who's working at the ski lodge. Meanwhile, Screech feels bad that Mr. Belding has to spend Christmas away from his wife and child, so he arranges for them to visit the lodge, which backfires when Belding decides to go back home.
65	26	"New Year's Resolution"	Don Barnhart	Story by : Leslie Eberhard; Teleplay by : Todd J. Greenwald & Rob Hammersley	December 9, 1995	326
The gang all help Screech come up with a New Year's resolution by sharing their own resolutions. Note: This episode marked the final appearances of Tommy "D" Luca, Lindsay Warner, & R.J. Collins

=== Season 4 (1996) ===
The cast for the fourth season of Saved by the Bell: The New Class was:

- Sarah Lancaster as Rachel Meyers
- Richard Lee Jackson as Ryan Parker
- Samantha Esteban as Maria Lopez
- Ben Gould as Nicky Farina
- Lindsey McKeon as Katie Peterson
- Anthony Harrell as Eric Little
- Dustin Diamond as Screech Powers
- Dennis Haskins as Principal Richard Belding
- Mario Lopez as A.C. Slater

List of Saved by the Bell: The New Class season 4 episodes
No. overall	No. in season	Title	Directed by	Written by	Original release date	Prod. code
66	1	"Oh, Brother"	Don Barnhart	Bennett Tramer	September 7, 1996	61751
Ryan and Screech are heartbroken when Lindsay transfers to a private school and Tommy D moves to Florida. However, new students arrive at Bayside: Ryan's new stepbrother Nicky Farina, beautiful Katie Peterson, and a football star named Eric Little. Ryan confesses to Eric that he likes Rachel, but all his attempts of asking her out fail when Nicky suddenly becomes "Mr. Popular". Notes: This episode marks the first appearances of Nicky, Katie and Eric.
67	2	"Unequal Opportunity"	Don Barnhart	Story by : Scott Spencer Gorden & Jeffrey J. Sachs; Teleplay by : Carl Kurlander & Renee Palyo	September 7, 1996	61763
Nicky applies for a job as usher at the cineplex where Rachel works. The boss, Mr. Dimmick, likes Nicky and hires him. It is obvious, though, that Dimmick prefers guys who can talk sports with him and he thinks that female employees are second-rate. Nicky is soon made assistant manager even though Rachel is a super employee who has worked hard all summer. Ryan agrees with Rachel that Dimmick is unfair, but when he talks to Nicky about it, Nicky doesn't seem to care. While Nicky is in charge the projector breaks and he has a theater full of unhappy customers on his hands. Rachel saves the day, though, by smoothly handling the situation. When Mr. Dimmick gives Nicky all the credit, he agrees that Dimmick discriminates against females. With Katie's assistance, Ryan and Nicky find a way to prove to the visiting vice-president of the theater chain that Dimmick has been unfair to Rachel. Dimmick is suspended and Rachel is rehired on the spot. Elsewhere in the mall, Mr. Belding and Screech are running Yukon Yogurt, but their product isn't very good. Screech and new employee Eric doctor up the taste of the low-fat yogurt with some high-fat hot fudge. The yogurt becomes a best-seller, but Belding doesn't know the secret. Also, Katie is an apprentice for well-known hairdresser Jean-Paul. Maria begs Katie to get her an appointment with him, which Katie does, but Maria's new hairdo is a big disappointment. Maria wants to complain but Katie is afraid she'll lose her job if she does.
68	3	"Backstage Pass"	Don Barnhart	Scott Spencer Gorden & Jeffrey J. Sachs	September 14, 1996	61764
A radio station is holding a dance contest at the mall with a prize of a pair of backstage passes to the MTV Video Music Awards. Ryan asks Rachel to be his partner but she's teaming up with Maria. Nicky asks Katie the same thing, but she says she wants to win and is pairing up with Eric. Meanwhile, Screech is smitten with a pretty customer at the yogurt shop named Linda (Amy Jo Johnson). Maria and Rachel show off their moves at the mall's dance club and they look great. Nicky, on the other hand, looks foolish, but while cleaning up at the theater he comes up with a routine, the "Crunch". At the contest, Rachel and Maria back out after two other girls do their exact same dance steps. Eric and Katie do a hip-hop number, but Katie gets tangled up. Ryan messes up his back flip and Screech does a dork dance. Nicky's "Crunch" wins the contest and the backstage passes. After the contest, Linda says she's proud of Screech's effort. Nicky meanwhile is buttered up by everyone in hopes of getting one of his backstage passes. He gets so disgusted with all the phony flattery that he tears the passes up. Screech tells Linda he owns a chain of the yogurt stores. When she finds out he's lying, she is mad at him, saying she just wanted to know the real person. The gang asks Screech to help regain Nicky's friendship, so he poses as a phony celebrity, "Screechio," to get passes from the radio station DJ, Don Lewis (Wally Wingert), who hosted the dance contest a day earlier. Nicky comes to apologize to his friends; they apologize to him and give him the new passes. He in turn gives them to "Screechio" so he can take his date, Linda.
69	4	"Baby Care"	Don Barnhart	Leslie Eberhard	September 14, 1996	61752
For a health class project, Mr. Belding pairs up the boys and girls and gives each one a computer chip-controlled baby to take care of for a week. Ryan is happy to be paired with Rachel. He wants to tell her how much he likes her, but the crying baby keeps ruining his attempts. Nicky and Maria are totally negligent as "parents." Nicky wants to hold a New York coffeehouse night at the Max and Maria wants to sing there. Both of them want to pursue their interests while neither wants to bother with the baby. Katie and Eric are parents together. Eric is a good father, having helped raise so many siblings, but when the baby runs a fever while in Katie's care, he thinks she can't take good care of the child. At the "coffeehouse" night at the Max, all three couples get in big fights and all the yelling and crying babies ruin Maria's song and they drive away the audience. Mr. Belding tells them if they don't improve as parents in the next three days they will all fail the assignment. Everyone works hard at doing a good job in the next three days, but the task wears them all out. Belding points out how much work it is to be responsible for a baby in real life. Ryan finally is able to tell Rachel he likes her – he asks her out and she accepts.
70	5	"The Tall and the Short of It"	Don Barnhart	Renee Palyo	September 21, 1996	61753
It is time for the girls to ask the boys out to the Sadie Hawkins Dance. Rachel is nervous about it, but Maria goads her into asking out Ryan, who accepts. Eric wants cute and popular Jennifer Wagner to ask him out, but she's not even sure what his name is. Nicky arrogantly acts like he expects Katie to ask him to the dance, but she hasn't done it yet. Maria goes into the business of selling dating advice. Eric makes a play for Jennifer (Gabrielle Union), but it is not working. To make Katie jealous, Nicky says he's got another date; Katie tells him that's good, go with her. Rachel and Ryan have their picture taken by Screech for the paper. Rachel's head is cut off in the picture. Both of them say they are cool with their height difference but in truth it seems to bother them. Screech tries helps Ryan with a pair of platform shoes and a pompadour wig, but he just ends up looking foolish on a date with Rachel. The two decide to back out of their date to the dance, but they both seem reluctant. Maria advises Eric to feign interest in coin collecting to attract Jennifer. It works, and she asks him to the dance. Nicky learns from Maria that Katie doesn't have a date for the dance either, just like him. Nicky and Katie talk and find out they really wanted to go with each other all along but handled it all wrong. Maria has Rachel and Ryan fill out personality profiles and tells them to meet their new dates at the dance. Maria has only one unsatisfied customer, Fuzzy. When her own date Sean turns up sick, Maria is stuck with Fuzzy. At the dance, Jennifer turns out to be a lousy date for Eric, talking about nothing but coin collecting. It also turns out that Maria has a good time with Fuzzy. Ryan and Rachel arrive to meets their new dates and find that Maria has wisely paired them up again. The only other problem is that Mr. Belding messed up the order for refreshments because he refused to wear his new glasses.
71	6	"Little Hero"	Don Barnhart	Carl Kurlander	September 21, 1996	61755
For a communications class project, the students are assigned to make a video about someone they consider a hero. Eric tries to impress Heather the cheerleader but she' not interested because he's a benchwarmer on the football team. Katie is excited that her old boyfriend will be in town next week, but Nicky is worried about it. At the game that weekend, Mr. Belding accidentally injures himself, a player and a cheerleader on the sidelines. From the locker room Screech watches as Eric is put in the game and scores a last-minute game-winning touchdown. At school Eric is now a hero, and Heather is suddenly interested in him. Maria and Rachel ask Eric to be the subject of their documentary. He agrees, but he blows them off to go out with Heather (Persia White). Ryan begins to sell T-shirts autographed by Eric. With tryouts for a new cheerleader, Katie is too busy to spend time with Nicky. Guest star: Jim Harbaugh as Himself.
72	7	"Student Court"	Don Barnhart	Bennett Tramer	September 28, 1996	61756
Mr. Belding and Screech are promoting the "Rainy Day Indoor Sports Festival," with the winning team getting a trip to Catalina Island. Eric is plagued by a tough guy, Bull Grabowski. Maria likes Scott Miller, but he already has a girlfriend, Natalie. Screech gives citations to Eric, Maria and Ryan for minor offenses and makes them appear before the Student Court. When the kids protest their sentences, Screech cancels the punishment but makes them into the new judges for the Court. The kids all abuse their positions on the court to help them win the Festival competition: Eric gives Bull a stiff sentence for chewing gum, Maria manipulates a breakup between Scott and Natalie so she can be Scott's partner, and Ryan "sentences" Nicky and Katie to detention in the gym so they can practice pool. Katie's a great pool player and Ryan makes a bet with some other guys in a game with her. When Belding catches them, he sends them to Ryan for punishment, and he makes it clear he expects Ryan to do the right thing. When the case comes up, Maria and Eric are ready to let Nicky and Katie off with a slap on the wrist, but Ryan, the chief judge, overrules them and gives them the prescribed punishment of no extracurricular activities for a month, which means they will miss the Festival and Ryan will most likely miss out on a weekend in Catalina with Rachel. Maria and Eric agree, and they undo the unfair sentences they gave to their competitors.
73	8	"Fall Formal"	Don Barnhart	Leslie Eberhard	September 28, 1996	61757
Katie is happy when Nicky asks her to the upcoming Fall Formal dance. Maria's date's father will be a chaperone. He's Paul Wilson, a big record producer, and Ryan has a plan to get him to hear Eric and his brothers sing at the Formal. Maria and Rachel are super-excited about the new dresses they've bought for the dance, but Katie is beginning to feel ashamed because her parents can't afford a new dress for her this year. Mrs. Peterson alters a dress of Katie's sister's, though, which Katie plans to wear. Ryan engineers a breakup of the Bayside Barbershop Quartet (who were supposed to be the Formal's only entertainment!), then has Mr. Belding listen to Eric and his brothers. Belding gives them the job on the spot. Katie is afraid she will embarrass Nicky in an old dress. To raise money, she tells Screech she can fix the broken air conditioner that has been plaguing Mr. Belding. Screech gives her the job. She and Nicky manage to fix it, but it soon blows up. Katie confesses to Screech that she did the job just for money to buy a dress. Meanwhile, Ryan has Eric do an audition before a fake producer played by Screech. Eric is stricken by stage fright even though he's just singing before Screech. He tells Ryan his voice is gone and he can't sing at the dance. When Ryan and Maria tell him Mr. Wilson won't be there after all, his voice comes back. Katie decide she can't go to the dance, either, and stages a breakup with Nicky. Nicky tells Screech he was part of the air conditioner fiasco and Screech tells him about Katie wanting to buy a new dress. The night of the formal, Nicky comes by Katie's house dressed in his tux, gives her a corsage and pleads with her to come to the dance with him. She is apprehensive, but agrees. When she gets to the prom, it turns out that Rachel and Maria love her remodeled dress but hate their own new expensive ones. Screech and Ryan hide Mr. Wilson from Eric, and he and his brothers perform. But Wilson doesn't hear their performance — he's helping fix Belding's air conditioner! Katie and Nicky share a dance and a kiss.
74	9	"Wrestling with Failure"	Don Barnhart	Scott Spencer Gorden	October 5, 1996	61759
Ryan tries to lose weight rapidly to make the wrestling team, only to find out he has to wrestle Nicky for the coveted spot.
75	10	"To Tell the Truth"	Don Barnhart	Elise Allen	October 5, 1996	61758
The kids are in the middle of tough mid-term exams. Screech convinces Mr. Belding to throw a post-mid-term party for the students but actually it will be a surprise 10th anniversary celebration for him. Ryan, Nicky and Eric get a rude awakening in home economics class — they have to bake a lemon meringue pie for their mid-term grade. The boys buy a pie at the Max and turn it in. They get an "A" on it. Screech tastes it and gives them the job of baking a cake, Belding's favorite food, for the big party. Meanwhile, Maria blows off studying with Katie and Rachel when Sean Pierce asks her out. Sean asks Maria to help him with his take-home Spanish mid-term. She agrees, despite her study schedule with the other girls. When Maria does study with them, her mind is still on Sean, who calls her up. She leaves to go out with him again. Rachel and Katie think he's using her. The boys plan to raise $150 for a cake, saying it is a gift for Mr. Belding. The girls contribute money, but they want to buy Mr. Belding a tie instead. Sean offers to buy it for them. Maria trusts him and gives him the money. The boys make up some sample cakes for Belding to try and they're all awful. They confess their deception to Screech, who is unhappy with them. The guys promise him that they'll come up with a cake, though. Maria brings back the tie that Sean bought, but Katie and Ryan recognize it as a cheap one they saw on sale. They try to tell Maria about Sean's dishonesty, but she thinks they are jealous of her relationship. Maria has a tough time with her history midterm and gets a "D". Sean doesn't seem to care though, he's just happy about his "A" in Spanish. At Mr. Belding's party, Maria asks Sean about the money for the tie. He admits what he did but says he needed the money for an emergency — which turns out to be a new cell phone. Maria breaks up with him and keeps his cell phone, which she gives to Mr. Belding as a gift. The boys wheel in a big cake that is lopsided and funny-looking, but surprisingly, it tastes good.
76	11	"Renaissance Faire"	Don Barnhart	Story by : Carl Kurlander & Renee Palyo; Teleplay by : Scott Spencer Gorden & Jeffrey J. Sachs	October 12, 1996	61762
Mr. Belding and Screech, dressed as a king and his joker, announce that Bayside will hold a Renaissance Faire as a fundraiser. But Ryan gets jealous as Rachel prepares for the Faire by rehearsing with a guy named Tim, who will play Romeo to her Juliet. Before the play can be presented, Ryan locks Tim in a janitor's closet and dresses as Romeo himself. Maria and Katie are running a Punch and Judy puppet show, but end up fighting among themselves. Nicky and Eric dress in period costumes and present themselves as the Men Who Sing Dreadful. Mr. Belding tries on a suit of armor in his office, then can't get it off. The play is scheduled to begin, and Rachel waits for Tim, her Romeo. Ryan shows up instead. There's no time to lose, so Ryan and Rachel play the scene themselves. But just when things seem to be going right, the singing duo of Nicky and Eric arrive onstage to announce Tim has been freed from the closet! Rachel is disgusted with Ryan and stalks off. Elsewhere nothing else is going right, either. Rather than the puppets, Katie and Maria do all the fighting themselves, ruining their show. The Faire's sponsors are not to happy about all the goings-on. Screech introduces Mr. Belding still stuck in his armor. The sponsors walk out also. To try to make things right again, Ryan convinces the sponsors to come back and give the Faire another chance. He apologizes to Rachel, saying he was just jealous of Tim spending time with her, and she accepts. Katie and Maria realize their foolishness also and do the Punch and Judy show over again, this time the right way. And Belding and Screech have a medieval jousting match to wrap up a successful Renaissance Faire.
77	12	"The Last to Know"	Don Barnhart	Renne Palyo	October 12, 1996	61760
Katie and Nicky try to help out Maria's radio show by having them host with her. Unexpectedly, Nicky and Maria develop feelings for each other, which angers his girlfriend, Katie, and results in her breaking up with Nicky.
78	13	"The Final Curtain"	Don Barnhart	Renne Palyo	October 19, 1996	61767
Eric befriends an old comedian Larry Madison (Jack Carter) at the hospital. The comedian dies the night before Eric is set to sing for the hospital's patients and Eric deals with the loss. While performing as clowns, Belding accidentally injures Screech, who guilts Belding into doting on him at the hospital.
79	14	"Hospital Blues"	Don Barnhart	Carl Kurlander	October 19, 1996	61766
The gang intern at a local hospital. Eric pretends to be a patient to gain the attention of a female intern. Mr. Belding signs on for a sleep program and Screech constantly prevents him from gaining any sleep. When Ryan needs a real operation, Rachel must face her own fears of hospital visits born from the loss of a beloved relative.
80	15	"Trash TV"	Don Barnhart	Carl Kurlander & Renee Palyo	October 26, 1996	61765
A tabloid show is doing a project on the gang to show their responsibility. They are excited to be on TV until they see their show which portrays them as selfish and irresponsible people. They decide to use the show's own tricks to get back at them and clear their reputations.
81	16	"Karate Kids"	Don Barnhart	Carl Kurlander	October 26, 1996	61761
The girls sign up for karate classes at the school. While defending Nicky while on their date, Maria protects him from a bully, jeopardizing his manhood.
82	17	"Vote Screech"	Don Barnhart	Jeffrey J. Sachs	November 2, 1996	61768
Screech organizes a "Get Out the Vote" drive at the mall. Rachel wants to sing in Ryan's band at the mall, but he has to tell her that she can't sing in order to save his band.
83	18	"Campaign Fever"	Don Barnhart	Jeffrey J. Sachs	November 2, 1996	61754
Rachel needs some extracurricular credits on her record, so she decides to run for student council president. The Drama Club is rehearsing a production of Bye Bye Birdie, but Mr. Belding informs them it must be cancelled since the budget committee has cut the club's funding. Eric nominates Katie to run for student council president to fight for the Drama Club. Katie's serious campaign is being outdone by Rachel's flashy but trivial campaign, so Nicky and Eric help Katie to liven things up. But when Katie tries to talk about the Drama Club issue, Nicky cuts her off. Screech's poll has the candidates neck-and-neck. Maria has the candidates on her Bayside TV show. They take questions from the audience, during which Rachel's campaign manager Ryan manages to turn the other clubs in school against the Drama Club. Katie loses the Drama Club support when it isn't mentioned in her campaign video. Afterward, Katie thanks Nicky for handling her campaign — then immediately fires him. She goes back to her old style of campaigning. Rachel realizes Katie is the better candidate and wants to be council president for the right reasons, so she withdraws from the race and gives her former rival her support.
84	19	"The Wrong Stuff"	Don Barnhart	Scott Spencer Gorden	November 9, 1996	61769
The Bayside gang goes to Space Camp for two weeks and fighting ensues over who will be named team leader.
85	20	"Science Fair"	Don Barnhart	Jeffrey J. Sachs	November 9, 1996	61773
The annual Bayside Science Fair is coming up and Screech desperately wants to win. Eric may be the school's only hope for winning with his robot duster invention, but Screech insists on enhancing his creation which could get Eric disqualified from the competition.
86	21	"The Fifth Wheel"	Don Barnhart	Robert Tarlow	November 16, 1996	61770
Katie is the odd person out as everyone pairs up during Space Camp.
87	22	"The Kiss"	Don Barnhart	Tony Soltis	November 16, 1996	61771
As the Space Camp program comes to a close, the gang encounter students from Deering High School. Ryan accidentally kisses Mary Beth and has to find a way to explain it to Rachel. Guest stars: Megan Parlen as Mary Beth Pepperton, Paige Peterson as Amy Wright
88	23	"Balancing Act"	Don Barnhart	Story by : Bennett Tramer; Teleplay by : Carl Kurlander & Renee Palyo	November 23, 1996	61772
Maria gets a promotion at the Teen Machine, but along with writing a term paper and cheerleader practice, it leaves her little time for her friends. Meanwhile, Ryan and Eric plan a surprise party for Mr. Belding, but Screech finds out about it and mistakenly thinks the party is for him.
89	24	"Stealing Screech"	Don Barnhart	Bennett Tramer	November 23, 1996	61774
Screech must decide whether he can leave break his attachment to Bayside with all its memories and people he loves for a better paying job offered to him by Valley High's Mr. Huffington (Fred Willard).
90	25	"Fire at the Max"	Don Barnhart	Story by : Bennett Tramer; Teleplay by : Carl Kurlander & Scott Spencer Gorden	December 14, 1996	61775
91	26	"Fire at the Max"	Don Barnhart	Jeffrey J. Sachs	December 14, 1996	61776
Ryan accidentally burns down the Max after forgetting to turn off the Christmas tree lights. Former Bayside High pupil A.C. Slater visits the gang at what's left of the Max after the fire and they all share fond memories of how the Max has been a special part of their lives. Guest star: Mario Lopez as A.C. Slater; Note: This episode marked the final appearance of Rachel Meyers.

=== Season 5 (1997) ===
The cast for the fifth season of Saved by the Bell: The New Class was:

- Richard Lee Jackson as Ryan Parker
- Samantha Esteban as Maria Lopez
- Ben Gould as Nicky Farina
- Lindsey McKeon as Katie Peterson
- Anthony Harrell as Eric Little
- Ashley Lyn Cafagna as Liz Miller
- Dustin Diamond as Screech Powers
- Dennis Haskins as Principal Richard Belding

List of Saved by the Bell: The New Class season 5 episodes
No. overall	No. in season	Title	Directed by	Written by	Original release date	Prod. code
92	1	"Desperately Seeking Work"	Miguel Higuera	Story by : Tony Soltis; Teleplay by : Brett Dewey & Perry Dance	September 13, 1997	501
Everyone except for Ryan has found a job for the upcoming school year. Ryan finally gets a job at the computer store with Nicky until Nicky fires him. Katie is desperate to find a job, even if it means lying on a resume which leads her into trouble. She is ready to give up her job hunt but a chance meeting with Olympic medalist Shannon Miller convinces her to try again and she ends up landing a job at a fitness club. Screech gets a part-time job as a mall security guard but goes too far enforcing his rules.
93	2	"Suddenly Ryan"	Miguel Higuera	Bennett Tramer	September 13, 1997	62151
Ryan has to deal with Rachel moving to Boston and later breaking up with him. In Rachel's absence, Maria feels left out when Katie starts hanging out with new student Liz Miller. The Max is revamped and now re-opened for business. Screech becomes obsessed with keeping the Max safe and goes as far as to start charging students for various activities and items in order to buy the restaurant. Note: This episode marked the first appearance of Liz Miller.
94	3	"It's Not About Winning"	Miguel Higuera	Bennett Tramer	September 20, 1997	502
The Bayside girls swim team is undefeated thanks to nationally ranked team captain Liz and new recruit Katie, but the boys team featuring Nicky and team captain Ryan is sinking fast. Eric has his eye on Shauna Elliot (Brook Kerr), a member of the girls team. After losing a meet against Westwood, the boys think they have no chance of beating Valley. So Eric decides to switch places with Maria so both can cover the swim teams for the school radio station. With the state finals coming up, Liz asks Screech for extra time in the pool. Screech tells the boys that their practice time will be cut to give the girls have a better chance of beating Valley. Katie has an idea on how to solve this conflict and Screech presents it to the girls team. At the other end, Maria is covering the boys team while Eric covers the girls. Ryan and Nicky play a phone prank on the girls, pretending that NBC Sports is doing a story on the girls. The prank ends up with Liz, Katie and the rest of the girls getting detention while the boys team practices in the pool. Katie and Liz are both mad at Ryan for his sneaky way of manipulating the teams, so both team captains meet in a one-on-one race to see who gets the practice time. Eric tries to get Shauna to take swimming lessons and which she turns down. Mr. Belding finds out the truth about the race and Ryan quits the Team. Along with Screech, Mr. Belding settles the dispute between the boys and girls teams and both make amends. The girls give the boys a pep rally and Ryan and Liz apologize to each other. At the big swim meet, Liz introduces Ryan to four-Time Olympic Gold medalist Janet Evans, who gives him some advice. Ryan wins his race for Bayside.
95	4	"Football & Physics"	Miguel Higuera	Tony Soltis	September 20, 1997	503
Football season is coming up and Eric has been training hard to become the starting wide receiver. Coach Wagner stresses to the team to the importance of keeping their grades up. Eric is proud and happy when the coach tells him he's starting against Central High. But when Coach Wagner finds out Eric is taking a physics course he tells him to play it safe and drop that class. Eric is ready to quit the class when he has a conversation with his teammate Perkins who tells him the coach hasn't said a thing to him about dropping physics. Eric feels that the coach assumes that because he's black, he will have more trouble with a tough academic course than a white player would. He later tells Coach Wagner that he thinks his attitude toward black players is unfair, and he complains to his friends Ryan and Nicky too. During the game against Central, Coach Wagner talks to Eric about respect, but Eric doesn't respond and he sits out the rest of the game. The next day Eric goes to see Screech about re-enrolling for physics and learns about standing up to an adult. Later he apologizes to Coach Wagner for his actions and tells him about all the things he did to make a better grade. The coach promises to make things up to him. Also, Katie and Maria try to turn Liz into something she's not, a mall shopper and an advice-giver, leading to Liz being upset by them constantly comparing her to Rachel. Screech demands his own office from Mr. Belding. Guest star: Michael Dempsey as Coach Wagner
96	5	"Highs and Lows"	Miguel Higuera	Brett Dewey	September 27, 1997	504
Maria starts smoking marijuana. Screech is fearing for his job as Eric fills in for him while he's sick. Maria and Nicky are looking at the end of their relationship when he finds out what Maria is doing.
97	6	"Letting Go"	Miguel Higuera	Story by : Perry Dance; Teleplay by : Brett Dewey & Tony Soltis	September 27, 1997	505
Katie and Eric begin taking all-natural herbal stimulants to help them keep up with the long hours they've been working, but after offering the herbs to a customer who passes out from over-exhaustion, they quickly learn about the little-known side effects of the drugs. Meanwhile, Maria becomes jealous when her ex-boyfriend Nicky starts dating Courtney, But she goes too far when convinces mall security guard Screech that Courtney is the thief that Screech has been looking for. Guest star: Annie McElwain as Courtney
98	7	"The Great Stain Robbery"	Miguel Higuera	Brett Dewey	October 4, 1997	506
Eric and Maria invent a spray that will help restore the life in shirts. Eric decides to sell it without testing for any side effects that the spray might cause. The spray soon begins ruining people's clothes, including Belding's pants before a school board meeting. Eric and Maria are brought before a student court that finds them "incredibly guilty", forcing them to work off the refunds at the Max.
99	8	"Boy II Man"	Miguel Higuera	Renne Palyo	October 4, 1997	507
Eric wins an Open Mic Night at the Teen Machine and a record company executive, Teddy Edwards, offers him a contract. Edwards decides to change his client's image and lyrics and turns Eric into Thug Dawg Little. Eric does a rap about giving up on school and life that stuns everybody. Eric decides that he doesn't want the contract if it means telling people to give up. Liz is fired from her cookie store job when she warns customers about the bad food, so Ryan gets her a job at the music store. Nicky gets concerned over Ryan goofing off to be with Liz and fires him, forcing Ryan to take a job at the same cookie store. Screech teaches an eager mall cop named Lucille how to be a proper mall cop but is worried about reporting her for accepting free food from Ryan.
100	9	"Big Sister Blues"	Frank Bonner	Perry Dance	October 11, 1997	508
Katie is troubled by Bayside High School's plans to honor her scholarly sister, Robin (Marnette Patterson). Feeling more in the shadow of her sister than usual, Katie decides to run for Homecoming Queen so she can boast an achievement of her own. She loses and is going to stay home but Robin points out how Katie has friends, which Robin never had time for with her studies, convincing Katie to go to the dance. Meanwhile, Screech must face his long-time crush on Robin and how to win her over while Eric and Nicky attempt to set Liz up with Ryan.
101	10	"Her Brother's Keeper"	Miguel Higuera	Lori Marshall	October 11, 1997	509
Maria will do anything, and does practically everything, to find her younger brother Tino – a lazy klutz whose only interests are girls and Gilligan's Island – a job at the mall. Because he keeps botching the interviews (even wearing jeans and a red T-shirt to one!), she has to do all the work for him. Even that doesn't help because, if there's a way to get himself fired, he always finds it before the day is up. Finally, Maria goes over her boss's head to get Tino a job with her at the Teen Machine club. There, being Tino, he costs Maria her job (to say nothing of his own)... and may cost the boss her license to boot. Meanwhile, Screech finds it difficult to hold down two jobs—mall security guard and assistant to Mr. Belding — and is forced to give up one. Also, Ryan and Eric enter a contest to win a jet ski, but realize the only way for them to win is by cheating. Guest star: Harley Rodriguez as Tino Lopez
102	11	"Friends Behaving Badly"	Frank Bonner	Renee Palyo	October 18, 1997	510
Nicky ends up doing all the work for a fundraiser fair. After Liz convinces the others to help out, Nicky starts to have feelings for her, which doesn't sit well with Ryan who is also attracted to Liz.
103	12	"Secrets & Liz"	Frank Bonner	Bennett Tramer	October 18, 1997	511
A producer from the tabloid TV show called "Cool TV" is coming to Bayside to see the next filming of Maria's talk show. Screech tells Maria that Mr. Belding will be her guest on the next show. Maria meets the producer Shannon Stewart, who wants her to change her format to an exploitation-type show where she finds out secrets from the rest of the gang to air on the next episode. Screech is concerned about the direction Maria's show is going in. The next day, Ryan and Liz are being interviewed on the show when secrets about their dating get revealed, causing Nicky to get in on the action. Shannon and her boss love the new show and think Maria is terrific. But the gang are all mad at her for airing their private business, and when Mr. Belding finds out what Maria has been doing, he cancels the show. At "Cool TV," vice-president Brian Blair tells Maria about the plans they have for her and signs her to do a weekly show on their channel. Shannon and Brian suggested that Maria should do her first promo at the Max. When she tells the audience about what she did, Maria rejects the offer from "Cool TV" and apologizes to everyone. Liz still has no idea who she has to choose to date, Nicky or Ryan. Also, Nicky has a plan to get tickets to see The Smashing Pumpkins in concert and enlists a fan named Bongo to help him.
104	13	"A Tale of Two Siblings"	Miguel Higuera	Tony Soltis	October 25, 1997	512
Ryan and Nicky still don't know which of them will wind up as Liz's boyfriend. When Ryan brings Liz lunch, Nicky interrupts them, and when Nicky takes ballet lessons with Liz, Ryan does the same thing. The stepbrothers continue to fight it out and Liz still can't decide between the two. Meanwhile, Katie and Eric plan to throw Maria a surprise birthday party, but the surprise is blown when Maria finds out that Screech and Mr. Belding are going.
105	14	"Liz's Choice"	Miguel Higuera	Perry Dance	October 25, 1997	513
Eric gets dragged to the Bayside Formal by Maria and Katie as the date for both of them. Meanwhile, the stepbrothers await Liz's reply after both of them ask her to the Formal. She chooses Ryan.
106	15	"State Champs"	Miguel Higuera	Rob Hammersley	November 1, 1997	514
The Bayside Swim Team has won the State Championship. While Katie's head swells (threatening her friendship with Maria, among other things), Liz's father wants her to cut out her entire social life, so she can train hard enough for the Olympic tryouts. For Liz, that means not only seeing much less of Ryan... but, worse, skipping Bayside's annual Masquerade Ball. Or does it?
107	16	"Screech and the Substitute"	Miguel Higuera	Renee Palyo	November 1, 1997	515
A beautiful new substitute teacher, Claire Martin (Christina Moore), comes to teach at Bayside, and Screech totally falls for her. He shows her around the school, and asks her out on a date. To everyone's amazement, she says yes. The couple is getting along great, but the entire gang (except for Liz) feels that Claire may have an ulterior motive of using Screech to get a permanent job at Bayside, since he's close to Mr. Belding. They tell Screech their suspicion, and he believes it. He tells Claire off and breaks up with her, despite her pleading that she wouldn't use him like that. Once Claire gets a job at Willowbrook Academy, but is still unhappy, the gang realizes Liz was right and they made a huge mistake. They come up with a plan to get Screech and Claire back together.
108	17	"Love, Bayside Style"	Miguel Higuera	Brett Dewey	November 8, 1997	516
At the Palisades Mall, Ryan and Liz have a fight after one month together; through flashbacks, and the guys getting stuck in the elevator, their friends help them realize they both need to compromise and work out their differences. Meanwhile, Screech is trying to fix the elevator with some help from Mr. Belding, but they keep screwing it up until Bob, the elevator repairman, comes to fix it (and does), but not before Screech insults his intellect. Finally, the guys get out of the elevator; Ryan and Liz apologize simultaneously to each other and agree to compromise.
109	18	"Foreign Behavior"	Miguel Higuera	Perry Dance	November 8, 1997	517
The gang goes to France for three weeks. Eric is homesick and Maria, Nicky and Katie almost get the class sent back home after walking out on a bill at a restaurant after misunderstanding the exchange rate of France.
110	19	"Thanks for Giving"	Miguel Higuera	Tim Meinhart	November 15, 1997	518
As the gang continues to help with Habitat For Humanity, Ryan, Eric and Nicky neglect their duties to see a football game. Maria gets closer to a student named Mike. Guest stars: Michael Strickland as Mike Reynolds, Brittany Alyse Smith as Sandra Reynolds
111	20	"Foreign Affairs"	Miguel Higuera	Tony Soltis	November 15, 1997	519
Eric gets over being homesick after meeting the class's tour guide, Danielle. But when he fakes showing an interest in the culture of France to impress Danielle, he almost jeopardizes the relationship. Liz is worried that Ryan is becoming attracted to a female photographer. To get back at Ryan, she goes out with another guy. When the guy attempts to overly flirt with Liz, Ryan arrives to stop it. Guest stars: Denielle Fisher as Danielle, John Chaidez as Franco and Amelia Barrett as Maggie
112	21	"Putting Up Walls"	Miguel Higuera	Renee Palyo	November 22, 1997	520
The gang helps Habitat For Humanity build a house for a local family. Maria is interested in one person there and discovers the house is being built for Mike and his family. However, she goes too far trying to "help" which makes her seem condescending to Mike. The rest of the gang mar the project by trying to get themselves on TV for reporters. Screech will stop at nothing to create the perfect mailbox. Guest star: Michael Strickland as Mike Reynolds, Brittany Alyse Smith as Sandra Reynolds
113	22	"Goodbye Paris"	Miguel Higuera	Brett Dewey	November 22, 1997	521
During the gang's last days in Paris, Eric decides to stay so he can work and be with Danielle. But when his parents disapprove, he must end their romance. Meanwhile, Katie, Liz and Ryan buy a fake Picasso sketch from a con artist. Guest star: Denielle Fisher as Danielle
114	23	"Private Peterson"	Miguel Higuera	Story by : Brett Dewey; Teleplay by : Tony Soltis & Perry Dance	November 29, 1997	522
Katie tries out for the school's ROTC program and is blocked out by the all-male team. She tries to turn to Eric for help, but he is stuck between supporting her or fitting in with the guys. Meanwhile, Screech believes he has contracted a rare tropical disease.
115	24	"Into the Woods"	Miguel Higuera	Story by : Tony Soltis; Teleplay by : Perry Dance & Renee Palyo	November 29, 1997	523
Ryan and Maria get lost while hiking. But things get worse when Ryan breaks his leg.
116	25	"Mission: Control"	Miguel Higuera	Bennett Tramer	December 6, 1997	524
After a river rafting trip, Nicky and Katie develop feelings for each other. Katie develops a fear of losing him that alters her behavior.
117	26	"Forget and Forgive"	Miguel Higuera	Brett Dewey	December 6, 1997	525
Screech is left behind on the gang's return home and he begins to think about the various times that he has helped his friends. When the gang come back for him, Screech yells about their actions and flashbacks soon have Belding upset over the times Screech has hurt him so he wishes to stay behind. Note: This episode marked the final appearance of Ryan Parker

=== Season 6 (1998) ===
Seasons 6 and 7 of Saved by the Bell: The New Class were filmed together as a single production, so the cast for the sixth and seventh seasons of Saved by the Bell: The New Class was the same:

- Samantha Esteban as Maria Lopez
- Ben Gould as Nicky Farina
- Lindsey McKeon as Katie Peterson
- Anthony Harrell as Eric Little
- Ashley Lyn Cafagna as Liz Miller
- Tom Wade Huntington as Tony Dillon
- Dustin Diamond as Screech Powers
- Dennis Haskins as Principal Richard Belding

List of Saved by the Bell: The New Class season 6 episodes
No. overall	No. in season	Title	Directed by	Written by	Original release date	Prod. code
118	1	"Maria's Revenge"	Miguel Higuera	Bennett Tramer	September 12, 1998	62501
Maria is reunited with her former Valley High classmate Tony Dillon, four years after he stood her up (she thinks) at their middle school prom. Although he would love to patch things up with her, she makes this impossible by spreading vicious lies and rumors about him – which not only costs him his job at The Max but drives his own football teammates to seriously injure him during practice. Finally, the truth comes out: Tony ditched her at the prom because he couldn't afford a tuxedo; and broke their more-recent date because his interview for the Max job (from which she got him fired) ran overtime... Meanwhile, Eric and Nicky and Katie try to console Liz after Ryan's departure, although Liz has long since gotten over it; predictably, her friends' good intentions pave a road to disaster... Elsewhere, Screech tries to convince Mr. Belding's son Zack that his dad is cool – by staging scenarios that will make Mr. Belding seem strong and/or tough. Guest star: Kareem Abdul-Jabbar as himself Note: This episode marked the first appearance of Tony Dillon.
119	2	"Do the Write Thing"	Miguel Higuera	Perry Dance	September 19, 1998	62503
Katie writes a story in the school newspaper about the leeway that is granted to the football team. This upsets Nicky, who has just joined the team. Mr. Belding reads the article and removes Katie as the school newspaper's editor, prompting her to re-write the story.
120	3	"The Lyin' King"	Miguel Higuera	Jordana Arkin & Tim Meinhart	September 26, 1998	62513
Nicky becomes upset when Eric tries to date his cousin; Eric is angry that Nicky is trying to take girls away from him. Screech tries to chase away Mr. Belding's employees so he can work in the store.
121	4	"The Young and the Sleepless"	Miguel Higuera	Jordana Arkin	October 3, 1998	62504
Eric battles sleep deprivation and becomes very moody when he is reminded of his responsibilities. He eventually falls asleep at the wheel of his car and crashes. Katie, Liz, and Nicky set Maria and Tony up on a blind date. An old bully returns and picks on Mr. Belding.
122	5	"Cigar Wars"	Miguel Higuera	Tony Soltis	October 10, 1998	62505
Tony introduces the gang to cigars. The gang quits when they learn of the side effects but Tony is caught and suspended from school. It is revealed that Mr. Belding was one credit short of graduating high school, and now must take Drama class with the gang.
123	6	"Win, Lose or Cheat"	Miguel Higuera	Ron Solomon	October 17, 1998	62507
Maria and Tony are pitted on a dating game show against Katie and Nicky, but are given the questions ahead of time by the show's hosts. Maria and Tony then expose the hosts during the show when they see that Katie and Nicky are fighting. Liz becomes an assistant to the show's director. Mr. Belding and Screech share a motorcycle.
124	7	"Hands Off"	Miguel Higuera	Tony Soltis & Perry Dance	October 24, 1998	62514
Katie is being sexually harassed by her new manager at work but remains quiet in order to keep her job. Maria's mother, a lawyer, helps Katie to report him. Tony attempts to overcome his fear of hamsters. Mr. Belding and Screech create a commercial for their store.
125	8	"Guess Who's Running the Max"	Miguel Higuera	Story by : Jordana Arkin; Teleplay by : Tony Soltis & Perry Dance	October 31, 1998	62524
Maria is promoted to temporary manager of The Max over Tony, and Tony refuses to follow her orders, causing a strain in their relationship. Eric is ridiculed when his real name is revealed. Mr. Belding and Screech enter "couples therapy".
126	9	"Mind Games"	Miguel Higuera	Tim Meinhart	November 7, 1998	62506
Liz's new boyfriend, Travis (Nick Spano), convinces her to do whatever he wants...like skipping out on her friends and responsibilities. Ultimately, he asks her to skip out on the big swim meet and see Pearl Jam. Meanwhile, Eric and Tony think Nicky is withholding money from them; Screech attends an efficiency seminar.
127	10	"Free for All"	Miguel Higuera	Lori Marshall	November 14, 1998	62515
Nicky is promoted to manager of the movie theater and hires Tony. The two begin to let their friends into movies for free and it gets out of hand, prompting their boss to fire both of them. They win their jobs back by filling movie theater with paid customers. Liz must chaperon a group of senior citizens. Mr. Belding gives Screech dating advice.
128	11	"Loser"	Miguel Higuera	Story by : Bennett Tramer; Teleplay by : Perry Dance & Tim Meinhart	November 21, 1998	62509
Katie wins a place in the state swimming championship over Liz, who was heavily favored. Liz becomes so depressed at the loss she wants to leave Bayside but she is convinced to stay by Mr. Belding. Nicky, Eric, and Tony fight over the theme of the school dance. Mr. Belding and Screech attempt to fire the custodian.
129	12	"Bye-Bye Tony"	Miguel Higuera	Story by : Tim Meinhart; Teleplay by : Bennett Tramer	November 28, 1998	62525
The gang tries to help Tony tell his dad that he does not want to move with him to San Diego. They recap the good memories they've had together.
130	13	"Seasons Greed-ings"	Miguel Higuera	Jordana Arkin	December 5, 1998	62517
The gang competes over who can garner the most donations to a children's charity and win a cash prize. Their greed convinces the charity to back out of the deal. They eventually collect toys for the children without the promise of a cash prize; Screech becomes attached to a chess computer in the store.

=== Season 7 (1999–2000) ===
As season 7 was filmed together with season 6 as a single production, the cast remained the same for both.

List of Saved by the Bell: The New Class season 7 episodes
No. overall	No. in season	Title	Directed by	Written by	Original release date	Prod. code
131	1	"Show Me the Money"	Miguel Higuera	Paul Dell & Steven Weiss	September 11, 1999	62502
Nicky, Eric, and Tony try to raise money for the Senior class trip by investing it in the stock market, but the stock crashes and the boys are forced to raise the money back by washing cars. Mr. Belding is sick and bedridden, leaving Screech to run the school.
132	2	"Prescription for Trouble"	Miguel Higuera	Story by : Bennett Tramer; Teleplay by : Paul Dell & Steven Weiss	September 18, 1999	62508
Katie injures her shoulder in practice before a big swim meet, prompting her to take painkillers. She takes Liz's leftover painkillers from a previous prescription when hers run out. Katie eventually injures her shoulder even more during the swim meet and Nicky has to dive into the pool to save her. Tony buys Maria a fake diamond for her birthday. Screech opens a massage parlor in Mr. Belding's office.
133	3	"ME TV"	Miguel Higuera	Paul Dell & Steven Weiss	October 2, 1999	62512
Maria, Nicky, Tony, and Katie enter a contest to make a video about Bayside, but Eric uses them to make a music video for himself. They lose their chance to win the contest, so Eric makes a video to apologize. Liz is left to do her and Eric's science project all by herself while he is making the music video. Mr. Belding sprains his ankle and must use a wheelchair.
134	4	"The Captain and Maria"	Miguel Higuera	Story by : Tony Soltis; Teleplay by : Paul Dell & Steven Weiss	October 9, 1999	62519
The gang enters the police/fire cadet training academy, where Maria hopes she can spend time with her dad who is the Captain there. She throws a party in her room just to get his attention. Rather than giving an acceptance speech for a coveted award, Maria's dad takes her outside and they reconcile. Nicky, Tony, and Eric end up stuck in kitchen duty. Mr. Belding and Screech become handcuffed together as part of a magic act. Guest star: Miguel Perez as Captain Lopez
135	5	"Liz Burns Eric"	Miguel Higuera	Jordana Arkin & Perry Dance	October 16, 1999	62520
Liz changes the scores on the test of a boy she likes, giving him a spot on the Honor Corps instead of Eric. When Eric finds out that Liz changed the scores, she turns herself in. She is stripped of her leadership duties and dumped by her love interest, and Eric is rightfully placed in the Honor Corps. Tony tries to prematurely discover what Maria got him for his birthday. Screech befriends a dog who is in K-9 unit training.
136	6	"The X-Friends Files"	Miguel Higuera	Perry Dance	October 23, 1999	62516
Katie and Maria are planning a party together, but Katie reads Maria's journal and finds a scornful entry about her. After not speaking to one another for a couple of days, Maria reveals that she made that entry when Katie chose to go to a concert with Liz instead of her. Mr. Belding and Screech enter a wrestling match to promote their store.
137	7	"Don't Follow the Leader"	Miguel Higuera	Paul Dell & Steven Weiss	October 30, 1999	62521
Eric, Nicky, and Katie are encouraged by their commanding officer to cheat in order to win a cadet competition. He pressures them to take advantage of Tony's injured ankle. They finally seek the help of Maria's father Captain Lopez, who catches the commanding officer as he is continuing to pressure Eric, Nicky, and Katie to injure Tony – Captain Lopez fires the commanding officer on the spot for his actions. Liz becomes addicted to candy. Mr. Belding and Screech enter a chili cook-off. Guest star: Miguel Perez as Captain Lopez
138	8	"A Mall Shook Up"	Miguel Higuera	Pamela Pettler	November 6, 1999	62518
An earthquake strikes while the gang is in the mall. Nicky saves a child in the movie theater before a support beam collapses, but wants none of the accolades. Katie introduces Nicky to a firefighter who tells Nicky that he was also afraid when he rescued people out of a collapsed elevator. Nicky eventually accepts an award for his heroics. Maria accidentally teaches a macaw to insult her boss. Screech wonders if he should tell Mr. Belding he spilled soup onto a jukebox in the shop, damaging it just before the earthquake.
139	9	"Party Animals"	Miguel Higuera	Story by : Paul Dell & Steven Weiss; Teleplay by : Tony Soltis	November 13, 1999	62510
The gang decides to have a drinking party at the beach after semester finals. It is Liz's first time drinking, and Katie is forced into drinking by Nicky. In a drunken stupor, Katie insults Liz and kisses another guy just as cops arrive at the scene. Tony injures his arm running from the police. Maria spends the night in jail. Eric is arrested but bailed out by his parents. Liz was not arrested because she was puking in a bush. Nicky realizes that Katie's actions are his fault because he pressured her, and he and Katie decide not to drink anymore. Eric puts down Tony and Maria because he did better on the History final. Screech and Mr. Belding believe that students from Valley are trying to vandalize the school.
140	10	"The Last Prom"	Miguel Higuera	Story by : Scott Yaffe; Teleplay by : Tony Soltis	November 20, 1999	62522
Maria begins to have second thoughts about continuing her relationship with Tony when she is at UCLA and he is at SDSU. She wants to break up with him but he buys her an expensive bracelet. While talking to Eric about her problems at the prom, the two kiss as Tony walks in. This forces Maria to tell Tony that she no longer wants to be together. Liz's prom date gets injured on the day of the prom. Nicky and Katie become overly stressed about the preparations for the prom. Screech accidentally gives Mr. Belding an overdose of allergy medicine.
141	11	"Mr. B Goes to College"	Miguel Higuera	Tony Soltis	November 27, 1999	62526
Mr. Belding's old college fraternity brother, who is now the President of the University of Tennessee at Chattanooga, stops by to visit Bayside while he is in town recruiting for an open position for the Dean of Students. After hearing about Mr. Belding's relationship with the students, he offers him the job instead. The gang wonders whether they should push Mr. Belding to take the position or stay at Bayside. Mr. Belding says he will reveal his decision next week at graduation.
142	12	"The Bell Tolls"	Miguel Higuera	Bennett Tramer	December 4, 1999	62523
Mr. Belding has chosen to accept the new job in Tennessee, and Screech is in denial. He eventually musters up the courage to present Mr. Belding with an oil painting at graduation which will be hung at Bayside. Tony and Eric ruin the graduation gowns in the school washing machine. Liz announces that she is going to Stanford. Eric announces that he is going to the School of the Art Institute of Chicago. Katie must withdraw from Columbia University because they will not offer her a full scholarship. Nicky contemplates remaining in California with Katie but she convinces him to go to NYU, although they have no idea if their relationship will last. The Bayside school song is once again sung at the end of graduation, led by Eric.
143	13	"A Repair to Remember"	Miguel Higuera	Jordana Arkin & Tim Meinhart	January 8, 2000	62511
Maria is tricked by a repairman who performs unnecessary repairs on her car in order to get more money out of her. Liz disguises herself to trick the repairmen into running the same scam while a reporter is secretly taping. The gang needs a chaperone for their field trip to Lake Tahoe. Screech goes on strike after being denied a raise. Note: This episode was aired out-of-order – it was originally supposed to air as episode 140, but was aired later for an unknown reason. This is most evident by Maria and Tony still dating in this episode (in "The Last Prom" they break up at the end of the episode) and that no mention is made of Mr. Belding's leaving Bayside for a new job (in "The Bell Tolls", Belding decides to leave his job at Bayside to become a college dean in Tennessee).
