= Scott Erickson (disambiguation) =

Scott Erickson is a baseball player.

Scott Eri(c)kson may also refer to:

- Scott Erickson (musician)
- Scott Erickson (golfer) in U.S. Junior Amateur Golf Championship
- Scott Erikson, fictional character, on List of Saved by the Bell: The New Class episodes
