= Christian Monzon =

American actor and model

Christian Monzon is an American film and television actor and model. First signing with NEXT then Bleu Models, Monzon appeared in advertising campaigns for Abercrombie & Fitch, Perry Ellis, Sean John, Phat Farm, Versace, H&M, Banana Republic, and GAP. In 2001, he became an underwear model for Dolce and Gabbana and featured in a fragrance campaign and two short films. Monzon then pursued an acting career, appear in the films If I Had Known I Was a Genius, Kill Speed, and XXX: State of the Union and guest starred on the TV shows CSI: Miami, CSI: NY, Crossing Jordan, Entourage, Law and Order SVU, and Dollhouse.

== Modeling career ==
Monzon appeared at IMTA (International Modeling and Talent Association) in New York in the summer of 1997. There he attracted several modeling agencies worldwide, including NEXT Model Management in Los Angeles, New York, Miami, and Paris. He left NEXT after two years and signed with Bleu Models where he has been for the last eleven years.

He has appeared in advertising campaigns for Skechers, Abercrombie & Fitch, Perry Ellis, Sean John, Phat Farm, Versace, H&M, Exte, Banana Republic, GAP, a major Xelebri campaign directed by David Fincher and Dolce & Gabbana. Monzon has worked with many of the world's best photographers and supermodels, including Kate Moss, Gisele Bundchen, Naomi Campbell, and Christy Turlington.

In 2001, Monzon was introduced to designers Domenico Dolce and Stefano Gabbana during fashion week in Milan, Italy. Later that year, he was offered a contract to represent the company as an underwear model, which led to one of three fragrance campaigns and two short movies, advertising the 'Classic Perfume' for men and a new fragrance for women, 'Sicily.' The short movies were directed by Giuseppe Tornatore and co-starred Monica Bellucci and Fernanda Tavares.

== Acting career ==
After enjoying success as a model, Monzon turned his focus to acting, studying at the Carter Thor Studio in Los Angeles.

His film credits include independent features If I Had Known I Was a Genius opposite Sharon Stone and Whoopi Goldberg, Kill Speed opposite Andrew Keegan and Greg Gruenberg, Columbia Tri-Star's XXX: State of the Union, Universal's Honey, and Hallmark's The Reading Room, La Milonga, and The Deadliest Lesson opposite Penelope Ann Miller.

His television appearances have included guest starring roles on CSI: Miami, CSI: NY, Crossing Jordan, Entourage, Law and Order SVU, Showtime/Sony's Huff, Three Rivers, and the series finale of Dollhouse.

In 2002, Monzon established his own Wyndotte St. Productions.

== Filmography ==
=== Film ===
Year	Title	Role	Director	Notes
2003	Honey	Bar customer	Bille Woodruff	
2005	XXX: State of the Union	Thief (uncredited)	Lee Tamahori	
2006	The Reading Room	Omar	Georg Stanford Brown	
2007	If I Had Known I Was a Genius	Chief	Dominique Wirtschafter	
2008	Gideon Falls	Gideon	Judith McCreary	Short
2008	La milonga	Augustin	Francesca Di Amico	Short
2010	Kill Speed	Escondido	Kim Bass	

=== Television ===
Year	Title	Role	Director	Notes
2003	Law & Order:SVU	Johnny	Juan José Campanella	Ep. 4.12
2004	Huff	Bartender	Bob Lowry	Ep. 1.10
2005	CSI: Miami	Officer McCue	Norberto Barba	Ep. 3.22
2005	The Closer	Jesus	Michael M. Robin	Ep. 1.4
2006	Entourage	Ducati Salesman	Julian Farino	Ep. 3.2
2006	CSI: NY	Daryn Kramer	Rob Bailey	Ep. 3.8
2008	Hot Hot Los Angeles	Pepe	Bennett Barbakow	Ep. 1.1 - 1.13
2009	Three Rivers	Michael Arellano	Duane Clark	Ep. 1.5
2010	Dollhouse	Romeo	David Soloman	
