= Kill Speed =

- Directed by: Kim Bass
- Written by: Kim Bass
- Produced by: Kim Bass; Kevin Alexander Heard; Deanna Shapiro
- Starring: Andrew Keegan; Brandon Quinn; Tom Arnold; Natalia Cigliuti; Nick Carter; Reno Wilson; Christian Monzon; Greg Grunberg
- Cinematography: Daniel Bramm; Mark Eberle
- Edited by: Michael Purl
- Music by: Sean Murray
- Distributed by: All Interactive Distribution; Epic Pictures Group
- Release date: July 2, 2010 (Japan)
- Running time: 113 minutes
- Country: United States
- Language: English

Kill Speed (also called Fast Glass) is a 2010 action film directed by Kim Bass, who is a commercial rated pilot. It stars Andrew Keegan, Brandon Quinn, Nick Carter, Natalia Cigliuti and Greg Grunberg in an aviation-themed crime/thriller drama.

The soundtrack features music by: Steppenwolf, Tears for Fears, Nick Carter, Jada Pinkett-Smith's Wicked Wisdom, and Nathan East.

== Plot ==
Best friends Strayger (Andrew Keegan), Rainman (Brandon Quinn) and Forman (Nick Carter) calling themselves "Fly Guyz" come up with a scheme to fund their Hollywood, rock-star lifestyle. Using high speed aircraft to deliver Mexican manufactured illegal crystal meth for drug baron Escondido (Christian Monzon) throughout rural California is the way they make their money. They team up with computer techie Einstein (Graham Norris). Rosanna (Natalia Cigliuti) joins the gang, but she is not who she pretends to be. When the DIA agent Jonas Moore (Greg Grunberg) offers a deal to rescue a DIA agent captured by the Mexican cartel, in exchange for their freedom, the friends have to fly once again.

== Cast ==
- Andrew Keegan as Strayger
- Brandon Quinn as Rainman
- Natalia Cigliuti as Rosanna
- Nick Carter as Forman
- Reno Wilson as Kyle Jackson
- Greg Grunberg as Jonas Moore
- Christian Monzon as Escondido
- Graham Norris as Einstein
- Tom Arnold as Rhaynes
- Bill Goldberg as Big Bad John
- Robert Patrick as President
- Joshua Alba as Vasquez
- Big Rick Hoffman as Biker Henchman #1
- Chris Maida as Biker Henchman #2
- Chris Callen as Biker Henchman #3

== Production ==
High speed aerial flying highlighted Kill Speed.

Under the working title of Fast Glass, principal photography on location took place in 2008 at the desert areas in California City, California. Additional sequences were shot in Los Angeles. Kill Speed used a combination of fast-paced filming that involved jet and piston-powered aircraft and was meant to give the film a Top Gun and Fast and the Furious vibe. Originally intended as a direct-to-video film, an overseas release in 2010 preceded its US release. While originally scheduled for release in 2008, the film was held up in contractual difficulties until 2010.

The film incorporates air-to-air filming of actual aircraft (including 300 mph propeller driven, experimental race aircraft and ex-military Aero L-39 Albatros jet trainers) with all the actors actually in the aircraft and, according to the producers, the first time in films that actors were at the controls while delivering dialogue.

== Reception ==
Kill Speed was premiered at the 2009 American Film Market (AFM) industry showcase, as "perhaps the most talked about film at AFM 2009." The controversy over rights had spilled over into lawsuits, with the resultant publicity probably making the film notable.

With its unabashed straight-to-video format, Kill Speed did not receive positive critical reactions. Dan Whitehead called it "an amateurish mess." UK Film reviewer Andy Webb of The Movie Scene noted: "... the shifting tone is not the movies only issue as the dialogue is also an issue with some terrible lines. I am not just on about the intentionally humorous lines but those lines which are supposed to be serious but end up cheesy.

Aerial scenes, however, featured strong production values and elicited the most positive responses from viewers.
