= Tygh Runyan =

Canadian actor and musician (born 1976)

- Born: June 13, 1976 (age 49); Vancouver, British Columbia, Canada
- Occupations: Actor, musician
- Years active: 1991–present
- Spouse: Sarah Lind (m. 2008; div. 2020)

Tygh Runyan (born June 13, 1976) is a Canadian actor and musician.

== Career ==
Runyan has had a long career of character and supporting roles. His most notable roles are as Dr. Robert Caine in Stargate Universe and Fabien Marchal in Versailles. His film work includes Disturbing Behavior, Blonde, Road to Nowhere, and The Immaculate Conception of Little Dizzle.

Runyan's character in Versailles is described as "the brooding, mysterious and feared chief of police", but became a favourite with "superfans" of the series. The actor commented, "One woman tried to hand me her baby ... I was like, ‘You know who Fabien is, right? He tortures people. Are you sure you want to do that?’"

== Music ==
As a musician, Runyan has been a member of Beans and The Awkward Stage and scored the films Various Positions and Control Alt Delete. He currently plays in the band Corredor from Los Angeles.

== Personal life ==
Runyan married Sarah Lind in 2008. They divorced in 2020.

== Selected filmography ==
- 1993 Judgment Day: The John List Story
- 1995 Once in a Blue Moon
- 1997 Kitchen Party
- 1998 Disturbing Behavior
- 1999 Our Guys: Outrage in Glen Ridge
- 1999 Touched
- 2001 Antitrust
- 2001 15 Minutes
- 2002 K-19: The Widowmaker
- 2002 Various positions
- 2004 Family Sins
- 2006 Final Days of Planet Earth
- 2006 Snakes on a Plane
- 2006 Mount Pleasant
- 2006 Holiday Wishes
- 2006-2007 Battlestar Galactica TV series
- 2007 Boot Camp
- 2008 Confessions of a Go-Go Girl
- 2009-2010 SGU Stargate Universe TV series
- 2010 Road to Nowhere
- 2010 Thirst
- 2011 Doppelgänger Paul
- 2012 Insoupçonnable (The Hunt for the I-5 Killer)
- 2012 It's Christmas, Carol!
- 2014 Forgive or Forget
- 2015-2018 Versailles
- 2016 Harvest
- 2019 Thicker than Water
- 2022 Blonde

== Awards and nominations ==
Year	Award	Category	Work	Result	Ref
2005	Leo Awards	Short Drama: Best Musical Score	White Out	Nominated	
2006	Leo Awards	Best Supporting Performance by a Male in a Feature Length Drama	The French Guy	Nominated	
2007	Leo Awards	Best Supporting Performance by a Male in a Feature Length Drama	Mount Pleasant	Nominated	
2008	Leo Awards	Best Lead Performance by a Male in a Feature Length Drama	Normal	Won	
2008	Leo Awards	Best Performance by a Male in a Short Drama	My Inventions	Nominated	
2009	Leo Awards	Best Lead Performance by a Male in a Feature Length Drama	Thirst	Nominated	
2011	Leo Awards	Best Lead Performance by a Male in a Feature Length Drama	A Night For Dying Tigers	Nominated	
2012	Leo Awards	Best Lead Performance by a Male in a Feature Length Drama	Doppleganger Paul	Nominated	
2012	Indie Spirit Film Festival Awards	Best Foreign Feature Film	Indie Jonesing	Won	
2016	Edmonton International Film Festival Awards	Best Canadian Feature (Drama)	Dark Harvest	Won	
2016	Edmonton International Film Festival Awards	Audience Choice Award for Independent Dramatic Feature	Dark Harvest	Won	
2016	Columbia Gorge International Film Festival Awards	Best of Fest	Dark Harvest	Won	
2016	Columbia Gorge International Film Festival Awards	Audience Award for Feature Narrative	Dark Harvest	Won	
