= Various Positions (film) =

- Directed by: Ori Kowarsky
- Written by: Ori Kowarsky
- Produced by: Michael Lahay (associate producer); Karen Powell (executive producer); Karen Powell (producer); Lori Roth (producer); Craig Stapleton (associate producer)
- Starring: Carly Pope; Tygh Runyan; Terry Chen; L. Harvey Gold; Marie Stillin; Michal Suchánek
- Cinematography: Robert Aschmann
- Edited by: Ross Weber
- Music by: Damon Henry; Andrew Herfst; Ida Nilsen; Tygh Runyan; Stefan Udell
- Production company: Various Producers Ltd.
- Distributed by: Alliance Atlantis
- Release date: August 24, 2002 (MWFF)
- Running time: 87 minutes
- Country: Canada
- Language: English

Various Positions is a 2002 film directed by Ori Kowarsky and starring Carly Pope and Tygh Runyan. Various Positions won the 2002 Prix de Montréal at the Montreal World Film Festival. Although the film takes its title from an album by (and Ira Nadel's biography of) Leonard Cohen, the subject of the film is not Cohen, nor does he have any affiliation with the work.

== Synopsis ==
In this briskly-paced romantic drama, college student Josh is on track for law school and a place at his father's firm. As his Orthodox Jewish family prepares for their traditional Passover celebrations, Josh hits a brick wall in the form of the alluring and troubled - and not quite Jewish - Cheryth.

As things heat up at the dorm and at home, Josh is suddenly questioning his faith, his father and his future. Even worse, Josh is caught in the middle as his father moves to cover up a scandal involving the Jewish cemetery, forcing Josh to take a stand for what he believes is right.

Passion and new love collide with family values and the demands of tradition as Josh, Cheryth, and Josh's family find themselves questioning their lives. Love and loyalty look a lot different when examined from various positions. In the end, Josh follows a road of his own choosing and it leads to a future of his own making.
