= Romantic Comedy 101 =

2002 Canadian television film

- Written by: Doug Kayne; Winston Gieseke
- Directed by: Peter DeLuise
- Starring: Jeremy London; Joey Lawrence; Tom Arnold; Natalia Cigliuti; Ingrid Kavelaars; Thomas Ian Nicholas
- Theme music composer: Brad Segal; Nic. tenBroek
- Country of origin: Canada
- Original language: English

Production
- Producer: Shawn Williamson
- Cinematography: Stephen McNutt
- Editor: Allan Lee
- Running time: 92 minutes

Original release
- Release: February 12, 2002

Romantic Comedy 101 is a Canadian comedy/romance television film directed by Peter DeLuise and starring Natalia Cigliuti.

== Plot ==
Igor Sullivan (Thomas Ian Nicholas) tells his new story to a film producer James Ford (Tom Arnold). His story is a love triangle involving Jennifer (Natalia Cigliuti), Patrick (Jeremy London) and Mark (Joey Lawrence). The writer and producer visualize the whole story sitting in the office and the film progresses. Mark and Patrick are two friends who work for an internet-based magazine. Then comes a new girl in the office - Jennifer. Mark and Patrick both fell for her, but Patrick hides his true feelings for the sake of his friend Mark. Mark is not really in love with Jennifer like Patrick. Mark just wants to sleep with her. This results in funny situations. Finally, Jennifer realizes that Patrick truly loves her and they end up together.

== Cast ==
- Jeremy London as Patrick
- Joey Lawrence as Mark Gibson
- Tom Arnold as James Ford
- Natalia Cigliuti as Jennifer
- Ingrid Kavelaars as Beth
- Thomas Ian Nicholas as Igor Sullivan
