= Saved by the Bell: The New Class =

American television sitcom (1993–2000)

- Genre: Teen sitcom
- Created by: Sam Bobrick
- Developed by: Bennett Tramer
- Country of origin: United States
- Original language: English
- No. of seasons: 7
- No. of episodes: 143 (list of episodes)

Production
- Executive producer: Peter Engel
- Camera setup: Multi-camera
- Running time: 22–24 minutes
- Production companies: Peter Engel Productions; NBC Studios

Original release
- Network: NBC
- Release: September 11, 1993 – January 8, 2000

Related
- Saved by the Bell (1989)

Saved by the Bell: The New Class is an American teen sitcom television series and spinoff of Saved by the Bell. The New Class premiered on September 11, 1993. The series ran for seven seasons on NBC as a part of the network's TNBC Saturday morning line-up, airing its final episode on January 8, 2000. At seven seasons, it was the longest-running incarnation of the franchise.

The show had the same concept as the original series but featured a new group of students roaming the halls of the fictional Bayside High School. Mr. Belding, played by Dennis Haskins, remained as the in-show school's principal. Many of the stories were recycled plots of its parent series. The first-season cast included Robert Sutherland Telfer, Jonathan Angel, Isaac Lidsky, Natalia Cigliuti, Bianca Lawson, and Bonnie Russavage. Unlike the original series, which featured very few major cast changes throughout its run, The New Class regularly changed its core cast with Mr. Belding and Screech (from season 2 onward) being the only consistent characters.

== Episodes ==
Season	Episodes	Originally released	
Season	Episodes	First released	Last released
1	13	September 11, 1993	December 4, 1993
2	26	September 10, 1994	December 31, 1994
3	26	September 9, 1995	December 9, 1995
4	26	September 7, 1996	December 14, 1996
5	26	September 13, 1997	December 13, 1997
6	13	September 12, 1998	December 5, 1998
7	13	September 11, 1999	January 8, 2000

== Cast and characters ==
=== Overview ===
Actor	Character	Seasons						
Actor	Character	1	2	3	4	5	6	7
Robert Sutherland Telfer	Scott Erickson	Main						
Isaac Lidsky	Barton "Weasel" Wyzell	Main						
Jonathan Angel	Tommy De Luca	Main	Main	Main				
Bianca Lawson	Megan Jones	Main	Main					
Natalia Cigliuti	Lindsay Warner	Main	Main	Main				
Bonnie Russavage	Vicki Needleman	Main						
Dennis Haskins	Richard Belding	Main	Main	Main	Main	Main	Main	Main
Christian Oliver	Brian Keller		Main					
Sarah Lancaster	Rachel Meyers	Guest	Main	Main	Main			
Spankee Rodgers	Bobby Wilson		Main					
Dustin Diamond	Screech Powers		Main	Main	Main	Main	Main	Main
Richard Lee Jackson	Ryan Parker			Main	Main	Main		
Salim Grant	R.J. Collins			Main				
Samantha Becker	Maria Lopez			Main	Main	Main	Main	Main
Ben Gould	Nicky Farina				Main	Main	Main	Main
Lindsey McKeon	Katie Peterson				Main	Main	Main	Main
Anthony Harrell	Eric Little				Main	Main	Main	Main
Ashley Tesoro	Liz Miller					Main	Main	Main
Tom Wade Huntington	Tony Dillon						Main	Main

=== Main ===
- Robert Sutherland Telfer as Scott Erickson (season 1)
- Isaac Lidsky as Barton "Weasel" Wyzell (season 1)
- Jonathan Angel as Tommy "Tommy D" De Luca (seasons 1–3)
- Bianca Lawson as Megan Jones (seasons 1–2)
- Natalia Cigliuti as Lindsay Warner (seasons 1–3)
- Bonnie Russavage as Vicki Needleman (season 1)
- Dennis Haskins as Principal Richard Belding
- Christian Oliver as Brian Keller (season 2)
- Sarah Lancaster as Rachel Meyers (guest star, season 1; main, seasons 2–4)
- Spankee Rodgers as Bobby Wilson (season 2)
- Dustin Diamond as Samuel "Screech" Powers (seasons 2–7)
- Richard Lee Jackson as Ryan Parker (seasons 3–5)
- Salim Grant as Robert Joseph "R.J." Collins (season 3)
- Samantha Becker as Maria Lopez (seasons 3–7) – Maria is a transfer from Valley High and an outspoken cheerleader. She is reunited with her ex, Tony in season 6.
- Ben Gould as Nicky Farina (seasons 4–7)
- Lindsey McKeon as Katie Peterson (seasons 4–7)
- Anthony Harrell as Eric Little (seasons 4–7)
- Ashley Tesoro as Liz Miller (seasons 5–7)
- Tom Wade Huntington as Tony Dillon (seasons 6–7)

== Production ==
=== Linkage to the original series ===
During the August 1993 repeat airing of the Saved by the Bell: Hawaiian Style television film, NBC ran promotions, set at Bayside High School and at The Max, where the cast of the original series and the cast of the first season of The New Class met and interacted with each other. These segments were a "passing of the torch" type of narrative. Also present were Dennis Haskins as Principal Richard Belding, and Bob Golic from Saved by the Bell: The College Years as the resident advisor from Cal U. One segment involves Zack and Scott in the school hallway, where Zack gives Scott a list pertaining to Mr. Belding to cause trouble for him. Mr. Belding overhears this and takes the list away, joyfully triumphant at outsmarting Zack. After he walks away, Zack hands Scott "the real list".

=== Cast changes ===
The show was notable for its cast changes. Each season featured one to three cast changes.

After the initial criticism of the first season of The New Class as essentially being a poor copy of the original series, the producers changed a number of elements of the show for the second season. Robert Sutherland Telfer, Isaac Lidsky, and Bonnie Russavage were all fired. Three new characters were introduced for the 1994–95 season. Brian Keller (Christian Oliver) became the new transfer student from Switzerland, Bobby Wilson (Spankee Rodgers) was the newest cool kid, and Rachel Meyers (Sarah Lancaster) was the school's fashion expert and shopaholic. Lancaster had previously appeared as Rachel in a single episode of the first season of the series.

The writers also invited back original cast member Dustin Diamond as Screech for the show's second season, as he became available after the cancellation of Saved by the Bell: The College Years. Providing continuity, Screech returned to Bayside High to work as Mr. Belding's assistant as part of a work/study program and also help build a bridge between the two series. Screech ended up remaining for the rest of the show's run, with very little mention being made throughout the story of his continued enrollment at California University. Further, the show's sets were redesigned to change the appearance of Bayside from that of the original series and Mr. Belding was given a new office.

Prior to Season 3 cast members Bianca Lawson, Christian Oliver and Spankee Rodgers left the show, and three new characters were brought on. Schemer Ryan Parker (Richard Lee Jackson), lively and outspoken cheerleader Maria Lopez (Samantha Esteban, then credited as Samantha Becker), and fashion-conscious R.J. "Hollywood" Collins (Salim Grant) were transfers from Valley High School.

At the end of the third season, original cast members Natalia Cigliuti and Jonathan Angel had decided to move on to other projects. Salim Grant was also let go and did not return for the new season, beginning in September 1996. New cast members Ben Gould (Nicky Farina), Lindsey McKeon (Katie Peterson), and Anthony Harrell (Eric Little) joined the show for its fourth season. Gould played Ryan's stepbrother from New York and was the love interest for Katie and later Maria. Katie was the newest "goody-goody" and Eric was the school's star football player.

Season 4 was Sarah Lancaster's final season and she was replaced in Season 5 by Ashley Lyn Cafagna as Liz Miller, a sheltered star of the school's swim team and is initially pursued by both stepbrothers, Ryan and Nicky. Also, the gang's original hangout, The Max, was renovated for the new season after the original burnt down in the fourth-season finale.

Season 6 followed and new cast member Tom Wade Huntington replaced Richard Lee Jackson as Tony Dillon, another Valley High transfer student and love interest for Maria. It was widely reported that Season 6 was in fact the final season for the series. In addition, NBC decided to prolong the series by splitting the number of episodes in half into another season (Season 7). These episodes had already been filmed at the same time as the sixth season and the cast remained the same.

Concluding the series in a similar fashion to the original, all characters go their separate ways into college. Eric is accepted into the Chicago School of the Arts to pursue his singing career and Liz is accepted into Stanford to pursue her Olympic aspirations (both constant themes throughout the series). Maria is accepted into UCLA and Tony is accepted into SDSU, prompting the two to end their relationship. Katie is accepted into Columbia, but is unable to go due to financial troubles. She instead plans to head for an unnamed Cal State University. Thus the series ends with Katie and Nicky's future in relative uncertainty, as he is accepted into NYU. Mr. Belding is offered the position of dean of students at the University of Tennessee at Chattanooga (the alma mater of Dennis Haskins). Screech's future isn't clearly outlined but it's strongly implied that Mr. Belding will recommend that he become Bayside's new Principal after Belding heads off to Tennessee.

== Home media ==
Image Entertainment released all seven seasons of Saved by the Bell: The New Class on DVD in Region 1 in 2005. However, these releases have been discontinued and are out of print.

DVD name	Episodes	Region 1	Region 2	Region 4	DVD Special Features
Saved by the Bell: The New Class Season 1	13	January 25, 2005	N/A	N/A	None
Saved by the Bell: The New Class Season 2	26	March 8, 2005	N/A	N/A	none
Saved by the Bell: The New Class Season 3	26	June 14, 2005	N/A	N/A	None
Saved by the Bell: The New Class Season 4	26	August 16, 2005	N/A	N/A	Unknown
Saved by the Bell: The New Class Season 5	26	October 18, 2005	N/A	N/A	Unknown
Saved by the Bell: The New Class Season 6 & 7	26	December 6, 2005	N/A	N/A	Saved by the Bell: The College Years DVD Promo.

== Saved by the Bell: The New Class novels ==
There have been 10 novelizations based on the show, released by the publishers Boxtree Ltd and Aladdin Paperbacks, all written by Beth Cruise. The books all feature the main cast, and have the same storylines that relate to the main-plots in the TV spin-off. The first five books in the series focus on the first-season cast, and the last five books in the series feature the second-season cast.

Title	ISBN	Release date(s)
Trouble Ahead	(ISBN 0689718500)	1 August 1994
Spilling the Beans	(ISBN 0689718519)	1 August 1994
Going, Going, Gone!	(ISBN 0689718527)	2 October 1994
Breaking the Rules	(ISBN 0752206702)	31 December 1994
It's the Thought That Counts	(ISBN 0689801955)	1 August 1995
Finders, Keepers	(ISBN 0689801963)	1 October 1995
Franken-Bobby!	(ISBN 0689804180)	1 December 1995
Spreading the Word	(ISBN 0689718853)	31 December 1995
Lights, Camera, Action!	(ISBN 0689718861)	31 December 1995
May the Best Team Win	(ISBN 068980069X)	31 December 1995
