= Express: Aisle to Glory =

- Directed by: Jonathan Buss
- Written by: Jonathan Buss
- Produced by: Jonathan Buss; Stephen Goldstein; Michael Sarner
- Starring: Jay Michael Ferguson; Abraham Zucker; Brandon Quinn; Margo Hara; Jean Speegle Howard; Harry Kalas; Kal Penn
- Cinematography: Skip Longfellow
- Edited by: Jonathan Buss
- Production company: PBA Films
- Release date: July 1, 1998
- Running time: 12 minutes
- Country: United States
- Language: English

Express: Aisle to Glory is comedy short film that was written and directed by Jonathan Buss, and released on July 1, 1998. Upon its release, the short became the film debut for actors Kal Penn and Brandon Quinn, both of whom went on to have successful careers in the entertainment industry.

== Cast ==
- Jay Michael Ferguson as Mark 'Dizzy' Gillespie
- Abraham Zucker as Mr. Kopenski
- Brandon Quinn as Charlie Murphy
- Margo Hara as Mrs. Watson
- Jean Speegle Howard as Grandma Gillespie
- Harry Kalas as Narrator
- Kal Penn as Jackie Newton
