= Thirst (2010 film) =

- Theatrical release poster
- Directed by: Jeffrey Lando
- Written by: Kurt Volkan; Joel Newman
- Produced by: Jeffrey Lando; Wendy McKernan
- Starring: Lacey Chabert; Tygh Runyan; Mercedes McNab; Brandon Quinn
- Cinematography: Jeffrey Lando
- Edited by: Jeffrey Lando
- Music by: Christopher Nickel
- Production company: Insight Film Studios
- Distributed by: First Look International
- Release date: June 22, 2010 (US)
- Running time: 91 minutes
- Country: Canada
- Language: English

Thirst is a 2010 Canadian thriller film directed by Jeffrey Lando and starring Lacey Chabert, Tygh Runyan, Mercedes McNab, and Brandon Quinn.

== Plot ==
Four young friends — fashion photographers Brian and Tyson, Brian's medical student wife Noelle, and fashion model Jennifer, who is referred to by the nickname "Atheria" — travel deep into the desert for a photography session. They suffer a car accident that renders their car hopelessly stuck in a ravine, stranding them in the desert.

Brian separates from the party to search for a way out of the desert, while Noelle notices that Atheria begins to show signs that she is suffering from both a concussion and a subdural hematoma as a result of the crash. She resolves to perform an emergency procedure to relieve life-threatening intracranial pressure inside Atheria's skull, but fails to save Atheria, who dies from her injuries. In desperation, Tyson torches the car as a signal fire.

Brian returns and explains that there is no sign of civilization in any direction, and thus no one to see the signal fire. After spending roughly 24 hours camped out by the car, Brian, Noelle, and Tyson decide that there is no hope of rescue, and realize that they have to hike out of the desert. Tyson advocates walking the 80 mile road that led them to their present location, since they at least know where it leads, but Noelle argues that there might be water in the mountains, which are closer. Brian recalls reading on a map that there is a town just west of the mountains, the only form of civilization around for many miles, and agrees with Noelle's plan.

Heat and thirst wear away at the three friends as they trek through the desert for days on end. Initially, Tyson seems to be the most resourceful of the three; he knows enough to nourish himself by drinking blood from a rattlesnake. However, as Brian, Noelle, and Tyson grow increasingly desperate for water, Tyson foolishly tries to alleviate his thirst first by eating a cactus — which only makes him thirstier — then by drinking a pool of water that Noelle warns him is tainted with arsenic. Tyson dies in the middle of the night as a result.

The next night, Brian and Noelle seek shelter in a cave, where they realize that they are dying of thirst. Motivated by Noelle's revelation that she is pregnant, Brian slits his own throat so that Noelle can save her own life by drinking his blood. Noelle at first refuses, but when it becomes clear that she cannot prevent Brian from bleeding to death, she drinks.

The following day, Noelle continues to hike alone, and despairs when she happens upon the crash site and realizes she has traveled in a big circle. In a moment of despair she remembers that Atheria mentioned breast implants. She desperately searches her friend's grave, which has been picked clean by wolves, and finds one intact. She then uses it to set up a saline I.V. Afterwards, she continues to walk until she sees a car that will presumably come to her rescue. As she collapses from exhaustion, it begins to rain.

== Cast ==
- Lacey Chabert as Noelle Edwards
- Tygh Runyan as Bryan Edwards
- Mercedes McNab as Jennifer a.k.a. Atheria
- Brandon Quinn as Tyson Edwards
- Maureen William as Waitress
- Mavourneen Varcoe-Ryan as Flakey Woman
