= Brandon Quinn =

American television and film actor (born 1977)

- Born: Brandon Quinn Swierenga; 1977 (age 48–49); Aurora, Colorado, U.S.
- Occupation: Actor
- Years active: 1998–present
- Known for: Big Wolf on Campus • Charmed • Kill Speed • The Fosters • Entourage

Brandon Quinn is an American television and film actor. While Quinn started his career in 1998 as Charles Murphy in the film Express: Aisle to Glory, his major breakout role came in 1999 when he played high school quarterback-turned-werewolf Tommy Dawkins in the Canadian supernatural comedy Big Wolf on Campus. Developing a cult following during its three-season run on Fox Family, Big Wolf on Campus was described as having "unpredictable laughs, visual whimsy, often clever writing and likable young leads."

== Career ==
He has acted in other TV series and films such as Chicken Soup for the Soul, The Nightmare Room, Big Wolf on Campus, What I Like About You, CSI: Crime Scene Investigation, Malachance, Charmed, and Sweet Magnolias.

== Personal life ==
Quinn is of British, Irish and Dutch descent. He found his passion for acting in high school theater after a serious car accident in his junior year that kept him from playing sports.

== Filmography ==
=== Film ===
Year	Title	Role	Notes
1998	Express: Aisle to Glory	Charlie Murphy	
2002	Fizzy Bizness	Richie Taylor	
2004	Malachance	Ringo	
2007	Silent Night	Mick	Short film
2008	The Morgue	Jacob	
2010	Thirst	Tyson	
2010	Kill Speed	Rainman	
2011	Life Happens	Hot Jogger #2	
2013	The Caper Kind/Swiss Mistake	Cool Water	Short
2015	Bad Things	Doubles	Short
2020	Greenland	Passenger on C-17	
2023	Die Hart	Danny Morrison	
2023	On A Wing and a Prayer	Ellis Ross	

=== Television ===
Year	Title	Role	Notes
1999-2002	Big Wolf on Campus	Tommy Dawkins	
2002	The Nightmare Room	Ramos	"Camp Nowhere: Part 1"
2003	What I Like About You	Glenn	"Partially Obstructed View"
2004	Drake & Josh	Mark	"Football"
2004	CSI: Crime Scene Investigation	Davis	"No More Bets"
2005	Reba	Delivery Guy	"Flowers for Van"
2005	Charmed	Agent Murphy	Season 8, Episodes 1, 5, 7, 9
2005	Twins	Keith	"Musical Chairs"
2006	Without a Trace	Bartender	"The Stranger"
2006	Vanished	Mark Valera	
2006	The O.C.	Spencer Bullit	
2007-2009	Entourage	Tom	5 episodes
2008	Knight Rider	Max Hunter	Season 1 Episode 7 - "I Wanna Rock 'N Roll All Knight"
2010	The Vampire Diaries	Lee	"Bloodlines"
2011	Against the Wall	Richie Kowalski	
2013	Melissa & Joey	Eric	Season 3 Episode 2 - "Toxic Parents"
2013	Bones	Peter Kidman	Season 9, Episode 9 - "The Fury in the Jury"
2014	Looking for Mr. Right	Henry	Hallmark
2015	Grimm	Charlie Riken	Season 4, Episodes 9 and 10
2016	The Fosters	Gabe Duncroft	Season 3, Episode 13 - Season 5, Episode 19
2016	NCIS	Greg Abell	Season 14, Episode 3
2017	Rebel	Thompson "Mack" McIntyre	Season 1, Episodes 1–9
2017	Grey's Anatomy	Leo	Season 13, Episode 19
2017	Kevin (probably) Saves the World	Ignacio 'Iggy' DePerro	Season 1, Episodes 7-9
2018	Sins and Seduction	Gareth Wilkinson	Lifetime
2019	Grand Hotel	Victor Calloway	Season 1 Episode 4
2019	Love Takes Flight	Todd Rogers	Hallmark
2019	Christmas Wishes and Mistletoe Kisses	Dr. Mike Acosta	Hallmark
2020–2026	Sweet Magnolias	Ronnie Sullivan	Main role (season 2–5); Guest role (season 1)
2020	A Welcome Home Christmas	Michael Fischer	Hallmark
2021	Creepshow	Wade Cruise	in "The Last Tsuburaya"
2021	MacGyver	Jace Olsen	(Season 5, Episode 9 - "Rails + Pitons + Pulley + Pipe + Salt)
2022	A Country Christmas Harmony	Luke Covington	Hallmark
2022	Cloudy With a Chance of Christmas	Drake Kincaid	Hallmark
2023	All Rise	Jim Evans	(Season 3, Episode 15 - "Say Something")
