= Natalia Cigliuti =

Uruguayan-American actress

- Born: September 6, 1978 (age 47); New York City, U.S.
- Occupation: Actress
- Years active: 1993–present
- Spouses: Rob Rizzo (m. 2004; div. 2013); Matt Passmore (m. 2016)
- Children: 2

Natalia Cigliuti (/sɪɡlɪˈuːti/ sig-lee-OO-tee; born September 6, 1978) is an American actress, best known for her roles as Lindsay Warner on Saved by the Bell: The New Class and as Anita Santos Warner on All My Children.

== Career ==
Cigliuti was born in New York. Of Uruguayan descent, she spent her early childhood years in Uruguay until her family moved to New York at age 5. She started her acting career at the age of 14 after a local talent agency discovered her at a fashion show. At the age of 15, Cigliuti landed her first series, playing the role of Lindsay Warner on Saved by the Bell: The New Class. This led to other television work, including a starring role on Pacific Palisades, Beverly Hills, 90210, Odd Man Out, The Random Years and numerous guest star appearances on programs such as CSI.

Cigliuti joined the cast of the All My Children in February 2004, playing the role of Anita Santos. In March 2006, she was let go from AMC after only two years due to declining story lines. She was taken off the show officially on April 12. Cigliuti appeared in the TNT series Raising the Bar as Roberta "Bobbi" Gilardi. She had a recurring role as Detective Sam Harper on the A&E's The Glades in 2011.

== Personal life ==
Cigliuti married Rob Rizzo in 2004 but by 2013 they had divorced. They have a son. She married Australian actor Matt Passmore on January 3, 2016.

== Filmography ==
=== Film ===
Year	Title	Role	Notes
1999	Simon Sez	Claire Fence	
2000	Held Up	Wilma	
2002	Reality Check	Serendipity	
2010	Kill Speed	Rosanna	
2011	What Happens Next	Roz	
2015	Joe Dirt 2: Beautiful Loser	Dr. Sue	
2016	Traded	Nell	
2019	Drunk Parents	Betty Donnelly	

=== Television ===
Year	Title	Role	Notes
1993–1995	Saved by the Bell: The New Class	Lindsay Warner	Main role (65 episodes)
1997	Beverly Hills, 90210	Chloe Davis	Recurring role (4 episodes)
1997	Pacific Palisades	Rachel Whittaker	Main role (13 episodes)
1997	Unhappily Ever After	Francesca	Episodes: "Experimenting in College", "The Ghost and Mr. Malloy"
1999–2000	Odd Man Out	Paige Whitney	Main role (13 episodes)
2000	That '70s Show	Nice and Easy	Episode: "Parents Find Out"
2000	Sabrina, the Teenage Witch	Mindy	Episode: "House of Pi's"
2000	V.I.P.	Caitlin Kittridge	Episode: "ExValibur"
2001	Some of My Best Friends	Jody	Episode: "Shaggy Dog Story"
2002	The Random Years	Casey	(7 episodes)
2002	Romantic Comedy 101	Jennifer	TV film
2002	St. Sass	Evan	TV film
2003	CSI: Miami	Toni	Episode: "Tinder Box"
2004–2006	All My Children	Anita Santos Warner	Regular role
2006	Waterfront	Regina Centrella	TV pilot
2008–2009	Raising the Bar	Roberta "Bobbi" Gilardi	Main role (24 episodes)
2010–2011	G.I. Joe: Renegades	Scarlett (voice)	Animated series - Main role (25 episodes)
2011	Danni Lowinski	Charlotte	TV film
2011	The Glades	Det. Sam Harper	Recurring role (5 episodes)
2013	90210	Elena Burns	Episode: "You Can't Win 'em All"
2013	The Preacher's Mistress	Sidney Marshall	TV film
2015	Disillusioned	Sarah Rosen	Episode: "Success"
2016–2018	This Is Us	Josie Woods	Episodes: "The Pool", "Toby"
2020	Deputy	Teresa Ward	Recurring role (11 episodes)

=== Video games ===
Year	Title	Role	Notes
2010	Mass Effect 2	Morinth (voice)	Video game
2010	Dragon Age: Origins – Awakening	Sigrun (voice)	Video game
