= Isaac Lidsky =

American author, actor and entrepreneur

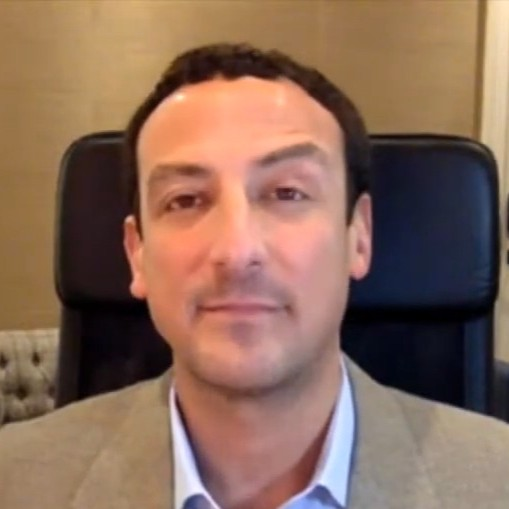
- Lidsky in 2018
- Born: Isaac Jared Lidsky; July 30, 1979 (age 47); Miami, Florida, U.S.
- Education: Harvard University (BS, JD)
- Occupations: Author, speaker, entrepreneur, actor and CEO of ODC Construction
- Notable work: Eyes Wide Open: Overcoming Obstacles And Recognizing Opportunities in a World That Can't See Clearly
- Spouse: Dorothy Johnston (2004–present)

Isaac Lidsky (born July 30, 1979) is an American corporate speaker, author, actor and entrepreneur. Before losing his sight, he played Weasel on NBC's Saved by the Bell: The New Class. He is the first blind person to serve as a law clerk for the U.S. Supreme Court. He is CEO of ODC Construction, a residential shell contractor in Florida.

== Early life and education ==
Lidsky was born in and grew up in Miami. His parents were Jewish emigrants from Cuba. A child actor, he was in a diaper commercial when he was six months old, and he went on to perform in more than 100 commercials. In 1993, when he was 13, he was cast as Weasel on NBC's Saved by the Bell: The New Class. Also in 1993, he was diagnosed with retinitis pigmentosa, a retinal degenerative disease that leads to progressive sight loss and blindness.

Lidsky left Los Angeles in 1994 to attend college. He graduated from Harvard University in 1999 with an honors degree in mathematics and computer science. In 2001 he returned to Harvard to study law. Lidsky graduated magna cum laude from Harvard Law School in 2004. While there, he served as an editor of the Harvard Law Review and a Fellow of the Berkman Center for Internet & Society.

== Career ==
In June 1999, Lidsky founded an internet advertising technology startup with Joe Zawadzki. Originally named "ru4.com," the company eventually became [x+1] and was acquired in 2015 for $230 million. Lidsky left the company after two years to attend Harvard Law School.

After law school, Lidsky clerked for Judge Thomas L. Ambro on the United States Court of Appeal for the Third Circuit. He then joined the appellate staff of the Civil Division of the Justice Department. In two and a half years in that position, Lidsky argued more than twelve cases on behalf of the U.S. government in federal courts of appeal.

In 2008, Lidsky served as a law clerk for U.S. Supreme Court Justices Sandra Day O'Connor and Ruth Bader Ginsburg. He is the first blind person to clerk for the court.

After a brief stint practicing law for a large international law firm, in 2011 Lidsky partnered with Harvard College roommate Zac Merriman to acquire a small business. They purchased the assets of Orlando Decorative Concrete, Inc. and created ODC Construction, LLC. ODC Construction is a residential shell contractor. It builds the structural envelope of new homes, including the foundations, masonry, framing and trusses. In 2014, the company had $70 million in revenue.

In 2014, Lidsky began speaking publicly about his experiences to corporations and organizations. In 2015, he sold his first book, Eyes Wide Open: Overcoming Obstacles and Recognizing Opportunities In A World That Can't See Clearly, to Penguin Random House. The book was listed on the Washington Post's 10 books on leadership to read in 2017. The book was published on March 14, 2017.

In 2016, TED invited Lidsky to present a main stage TED Talk at TEDSUMMIT 2016 in Banff, Canada. The talk received a standing ovation.

Lidsky is a member of the Young President's Organization (YPO), the Chapter Chair for the Orlando Chapter and a member of the Regional Executive Committee for the Southeast U.S. and Caribbean Region. He is also a member of the Young Entrepreneurs Council.

== Personal life ==
Logo of Hope for Vision

Lidsky is on the advisory board of and is the chairman and president of the Hope for Vision.

Lidsky met his wife Dorothy in 2002 when she was a senior at Harvard College studying art history and he was a first year law student. They married on June 13, 2004. On September 14, 2010, Dorothy gave birth to the couple's triplets, Lily Louise, Phineas, and Thaddeus. On December 5, 2015, their fourth child was born, daughter Clementine. The family lives in Windermere, Florida.

== Other achievements ==
Tapped to lead the Orlando Chapter and to serve on the regional executive committee for the Southeast U.S. and Caribbean.

Appointed to state leadership positions by the governor of Florida and to a federal position by a U.S. Senator.

Sits on the board of the Florida Hospital For Children.

Named 1 of 4 Temple Bar Scholars by the United Kingdom's Inns of Court and brought to London for a month-long idea exchange with UK Supreme Court justices and leading barristers.

Featured in numerous national media, including Forbes, MSNBC, U.S. News & World Report, 60 Minutes, CNN, Voice of America, Business News Daily, Daily Business Review, Business Insider, Men's Health, People magazine, the National Law Journal, and the American Bar Association Journal.

== See also ==
- List of law clerks for the sixth seat of the Supreme Court of the United States
- List of law clerks for the eighth seat of the Supreme Court of the United States
