= Carl Kurlander =

American screenwriter

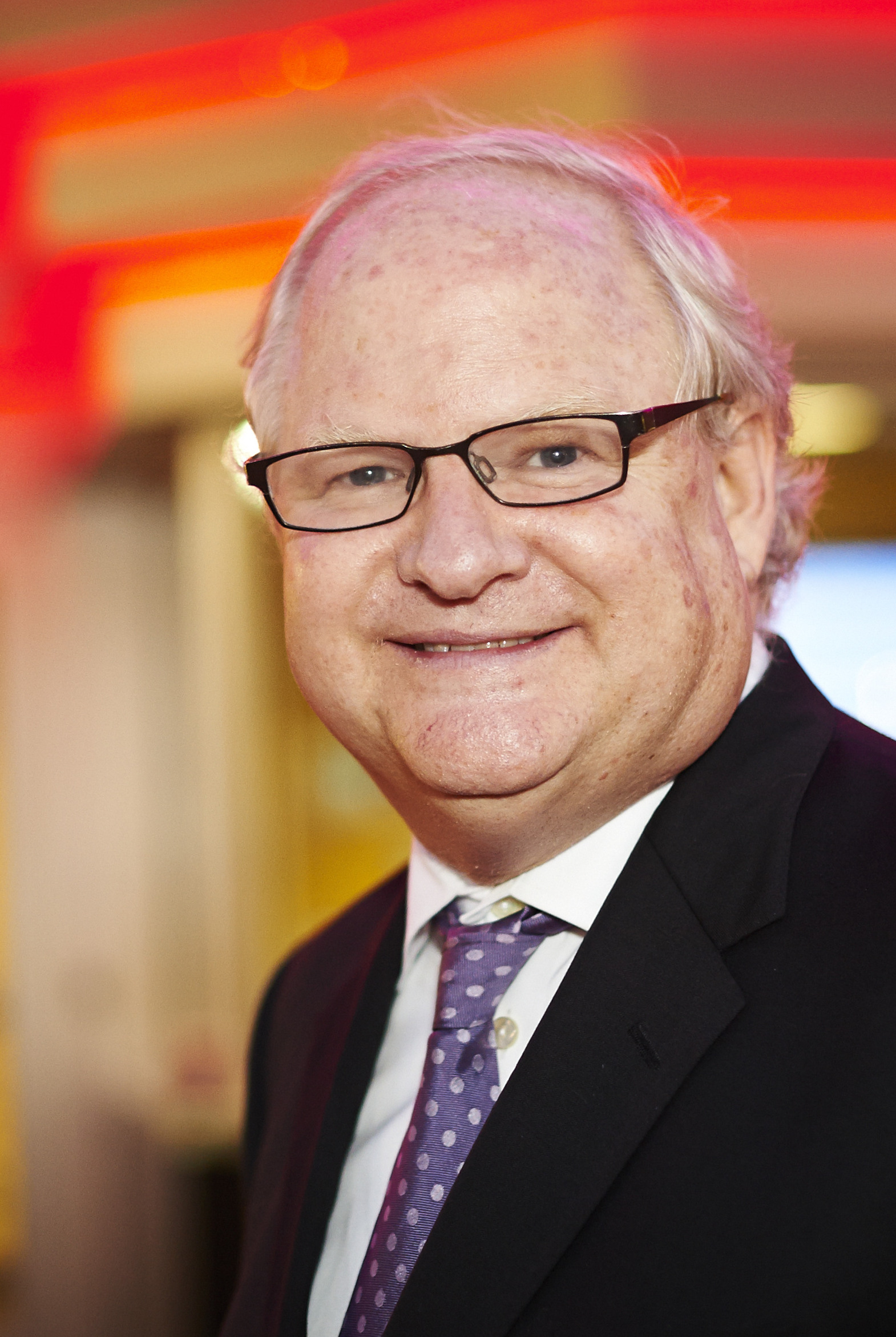
- Carl Kurlander in 2014
- Born: United States
- Occupations: Television writer, screenwriter, television producer

Carl Kurlander is an American screenwriter, television producer, and documentary filmmaker. He was born in Chicago and grew up in Cleveland and Pittsburgh and attended Shady Side Academy and Duke University. Kurlander is best known for his extensive work on American teen sitcoms and has served as producer with Peter Engel on a number of programmes including Saved by the Bell: The New Class, Hang Time, USA High and Malibu, CA and as a screenwriter who co-wrote the semi-autobiographical hit St. Elmo's Fire. He has also produced several award-winning documentaries, including My Tale of Two Cities, A Shot Felt 'Round The World. "Burden of Genius", and the ten episode Starz TV docuseries "The Chair".

Kurlander is co-author of The F Word: A Guide to Surviving Your Family with comedian Louie Anderson, and was featured in Po Bronson's bestselling book What Should I Do With My Life?, which landed him on The Oprah Winfrey Show in February 2003, on a program about people who had changed their lives, where Kurlander spoke about leaving Hollywood to move back to his hometown to teach at the University of Pittsburgh for what he thought would be a one-year Hollywood sabbatical.

This journey inspired a movie Kurlander produced and directed, My Tale of Two Cities, about coming home and the city of Pittsburgh reinventing itself for a new age. The film uses the metaphor of Pittsburgh being the real-life Mister Rogers' Neighborhood and, during the making of the film, Kurlander and his crew got crowds from Times Square to Beverly Hills to sing Fred Rogers' theme song "Won't You Be My Neighbor?" The film, which was picked up by Panorama Entertainment, has played over 26 cities across North America including special screenings for the International MENSA society, the keynote for the International Downtown Association Annual Conference, and on Capitol Hill at the U.S. Capitol Visitor Center where Congressman Mike Doyle called the film "a comeback story which can inspire cities around this country." Howard Fineman of Newsweek and The Huffington Post wrote: '"Carl Kurlander's movie is the wry, funny tale of the fulfillment he found moving back home to the city of his youth. A cross between Woody Allen and Fred Rogers, he reminds us that our cities are the real "Real America" because they are the creative, connected places in which we can best renew ourselves, our country, and our hope for all humanity."

Kurlander is also the producer of the award-winning documentary The Shot Felt 'Round The World, also known as A Shot That Saved The World, which won Best Documentary at the San Luis Obisbo Film Festival and has been picked up for broadcast by the Smithsonian Channel. The film is about Jonas Salk and his team at the University of Pittsburgh who pulled together with a nation to conquer one of the most feared diseases of the twentieth century, polio, and current efforts to finish the job and make the world polio free. Shot began as a class project at the University of Pittsburgh based on footage culled from the 50th Anniversary Celebration of the Salk vaccine. The updated version of the film features an interview with Bill Gates speaking about the current polio eradication effort. Though winning the CINE Golden Eagle Award when it first came out for best Science Program, the film received renewed attention during the COVID pandemic leading to Kurlander appearing on CBS Sunday Morning segment about "How The Fight Against Polio Was Won" and the film "Chasing Covid" which Kurlander produced and directed.

Kurlander also produced the film "Burden of Genius" about transplant pioneer Dr. Thomas Starzl who turned the idea of organ transplantation-- once thought to be science fiction-- into an everyday miracle which has saved countless lives. That film has won several Best Documentary Prizes and screened at leading medical centers around the world from Harvard's Mass General to Stanford, and from New Delhi to Hiroshima.

Kurlander produced the Starz TV ten part TV series "The Chair" with Chris Moore ("Project Greenlight", "Good Will Hunting") and Zach Quinto which documented two directors in Pittsburgh making two different movies from the same screenplay. The show won the 2015 Best Reality Programming from the TV Critic's Association.

In addition to continuing to teach as a senior lecturer at the University of Pittsburgh, Kurlander is also the Director of the Pitt in LA program there as well as Founding Producer of the Pittsburgh Lens at the Center for Creativity. He has been involved in non-profit activities developing innovative "Youth and Media" programs and helping develop Southwestern PA as a player in the film and television industry. Carl has also written articles for the L.A. Times, Deadline.com, the Pittsburgh Post-Gazette, the Cleveland Plain Dealer, and The Conversation which have been republished in publications from Scientific American to MS. Magazine.
