= List of Saved by the Bell episodes =

The following is a list of episodes for the NBC teen sitcom Saved by the Bell. The series premiered on August 20, 1989, and ended on May 22, 1993, with 86 episodes produced spanning four seasons. The number of episodes was increased for syndication, adding re-purposed episodes of Good Morning, Miss Bliss (excluding the pilot), the follow-up series Saved by the Bell: The College Years, and the TV movies Saved by the Bell: Hawaiian Style and Saved by the Bell: Wedding in Las Vegas (broken into four episodes each). The total number of syndicated episodes is 126, though the number aired varies by broadcaster. The storyline follows Zack Morris through junior high, high school and college, to his eventual marriage to Kelly Kapowski. The related series Saved by the Bell: The New Class maintains a separate storyline.

== Series overview ==
| Season / Series | Episodes | Originally released | | |
| Season / Series | Episodes | First released | Last released | Network |
|---|---|---|---|---|
| Good Morning, Miss Bliss | Pilot | July 11, 1987 | | NBC |
| Good Morning, Miss Bliss | 13 | November 30, 1988 | March 18, 1989 | Disney Channel |
| Season 1 | 16 | August 20, 1989 | December 16, 1989 | NBC |
| Season 2 | 18 | September 8, 1990 | December 23, 1990 | NBC |
| Season 3 | 26 | September 14, 1991 | December 21, 1991 | NBC |
| Season 4 | 26 | September 12, 1992 | May 22, 1993 | NBC |
| Hawaiian Style | | November 27, 1992 | | NBC |
| The College Years | 19 | May 22, 1993 | February 8, 1994 | NBC |
| Wedding in Las Vegas | | October 7, 1994 | | NBC |

== Good Morning, Miss Bliss (1987–89) ==
| No. | Title | Directed by | Written by | Original release date |
|---|---|---|---|---|
| 0 | "Pilot" | Peter Bonerz | Sam Bobrick | July 11, 1987 |
| 1 | "Summer Love" | Burt Brinckerhoff | Peter Engel | November 30, 1988 |
| 2 | "Love Letters" | Burt Brinckerhoff | David Garber & Bruce E. Kalish | December 7, 1988 |
| 3 | "Wall Street" | Burt Brinckerhoff | Jake Weinberger & Mike Weinberger | December 14, 1988 |
| 4 | "Leaping to Conclusions" | Burt Brinckerhoff | Susan Sebastian & Diana Ayers | December 21, 1988 |
| 5 | "Parents and Teachers" | Gary Shimokawa | Lawrence H. Levy | December 28, 1988 |
| 6 | "Showdown" | Gary Shimokawa | R.J. Colleary | January 4, 1989 |
| 7 | "Save the Last Dance for Me" | Gary Shimokawa | Gwyn Gurian & Skip Frank | February 4, 1989 |
| 8 | "The Boy Who Cried Rat" | Gary Shimokawa | Robert Burris & Michael Ware | February 11, 1989 |
| 9 | "Let's Get Together" | Burt Brinckerhoff | Michael Poryes | February 18, 1989 |
| 10 | "Practical Jokes" | Gary Shimokawa | Howard Ostroff | February 25, 1989 |
| 11 | "Stevie" | Burt Brinckerhoff | Jake Weinberger & Mike Weinberger | March 4, 1989 |
| 12 | "Clubs and Cliques" | Burt Brinckerhoff | Michael Poryes & R.J. Colleary | March 11, 1989 |
| 13 | "The Mentor" | Gary Shimokawa | Story by : Jim Carlson & Terrence McDonnell; Teleplay by : Jim Carlson, Terrence McDonnell, & Michael Poryes | March 18, 1989 |

== Episodes ==
=== Season 1 (1989) ===
| No. overall | No. in season | Title | Directed by | Written by | Original release date | Prod. code | Viewers (millions) |
|---|---|---|---|---|---|---|---|
| 1 | 1 | "Dancing to the Max" | Don Barnhart | Peter Engel & Tom Tenowich | August 20, 1989 | 6318 | 12.9 |
A major dance contest held at The Max is set to be hosted by Casey Kasem and televised on NBC (the network behind Saved by the Bell in real life). Meanwhile, a girl named Jessie Spano (Elizabeth Berkley) is self-conscious of her height.
| 2 | 2 | "The Lisa Card" | Don Barnhart | Tom Tenowich | August 28, 1989 | 6315 | 16.3 |
Lisa (Lark Voorhies) uses her father's credit card as a reward for doing well in school, but she goes overboard with her spending, and the gang must help her think of how to make money to defray her debt.
| 3 | 3 | "The Gift" | Dennis Erdman | Bennett Tramer | September 8, 1989 | 6314 | 8.1 |
When Screech (Dustin Diamond) is hit by lightning, he gains the power to see into the future, which Zack (Mark-Paul Gosselaar) and his friend, Slater (Mario Lopez), use to their advantage. Zack uses Screech's ability to place bets with Slater, including one that he would get an A in history, but things wear off before he can help Zack cheat.
| 4 | 4 | "Fatal Distraction" | Gary Shimokawa | Mark Fink | September 9, 1989 | 6312 | N/A |
The big dance is approaching and Zack must get the popular and beautiful Kelly Kapowski (Tiffani-Amber Thiessen) to go with him, so he goes as far as bugging Jessie's room while her, Kelly and Lisa are having a sleepover. To Zack's shock, the girls see it and decide to swear revenge by making it look like Kelly is insane.
| 5 | 5 | "Screech's Woman" | Gary Shimokawa | R.J. Colleary | September 16, 1989 | 6313 | N/A |
Zack says Screech needs a girlfriend and proceeds to get him one. However, when there is not anyone willing, he dresses up as a girl and goes out with Screech, but he has to act fast when Screech takes a "liking" to him.
| 6 | 6 | "Aloha Slater" | Don Barnhart | Michael Swerdlick | September 23, 1989 | 6317 | N/A |
When Slater's dad is transferred to Hawaii, Zack sees it as a perfect opportunity to get Slater to move away so all the attention from the girls comes back to him. As a result, Zack ends up making it seem as though Slater is dying to the girls, but things backfire when Kelly knows the truth after Zack steals Slater's trophy.
| 7 | 7 | "The Substitute" | Don Barnhart | Bennett Tramer | September 30, 1989 | 6319 | N/A |
When Ms. Simpson strains her back, a substitute teacher named Tony Crane takes over her class. However, when all the girls--including Lisa, Jessie, and Kelly--fall for Mr. Crane, Zack and Slater are jealous, so they try to make it seem as though Crane is married, and Crane plays along after he finds out what the girls were trying to do.
| 8 | 8 | "Cream for a Day" | Don Barnhart | Scott Spencer Gorden | October 7, 1989 | 6320 | N/A |
When Kelly is nominated as homecoming queen, her dream is shattered after she gets a zit. Zack comes up with a solution, but it backfires.
| 9 | 9 | "Pinned to the Mat" | Don Barnhart | Jeffrey J. Sachs | October 14, 1989 | 6323 | N/A |
Zack bets against a Valley wrestler named Marvin Niedick that Slater will win the match. However, things go wrong when Slater quits wrestling out of possible fear to join cooking club. Screech stands in for him; but since he is not cut out for wrestling like Slater, it fails.
| 10 | 10 | "Beauty and the Screech" | Don Barnhart | Larry Balmagia & Scott Spencer Gorden | October 21, 1989 | 6324 | N/A |
In order to go see George Michael in concert, Kelly must pass a science test. Zack persuades Screech to tutor Kelly, a ploy which is more for his benefit however. When Kelly and Screech's friendship becomes closer thanks to this, Zack (and Slater) are jealous, thinking that Screech and Kelly are in love.
| 11 | 11 | "The Friendship Business" | Don Barnhart | Bennett Tramer | November 4, 1989 | 6326 | N/A |
The gang sells friendship bracelets for a business class project. Zack names himself as "boss," but Kelly, Jessie, and Slater feel he is pushing them too hard, leading them to leave to form a rival company selling a similar product.
| 12 | 12 | "The Mamas and the Papas" | Don Barnhart | Story by : Stephanie Gorman & Hollace White; Teleplay by : Peter Engel & Tom Tenowich | November 11, 1989 | 6321 | N/A |
For assignment, everyone is in pairs and acts out married life to prepare for adulthood: Zack and Kelly, Jessie and Slater, Screech and Lisa. However, Slater tries to ruin Zack and Kelly's "marriage" with Screech's aid, because he wanted to be married to Kelly.
| 13 | 13 | "The Election" | Gary Shimokawa | Story by : Tom Tenowich; Teleplay by : R.J. Colleary & Bennett Tramer | November 18, 1989 | 6316 | N/A |
Zack and Jessie are running for class president, but Zack only wants to run because he wants to win a trip to Washington, D.C., the home of the President of the United States (at the time, George H. W. Bush). When the trip is canceled, Zack must prove he was not running just because of it.
| 14 | 14 | "The Zack Tapes" | Don Barnhart | Peter Engel & Tom Tenowich | December 2, 1989 | 6325 | N/A |
During class, Zack learns subliminal advertising and sees that it can be used to trick Kelly into dancing with him. However, Kelly is on to his ploy and she and the girls decide to teach Zack a lesson, which leaves him humiliated.
| 15 | 15 | "King of the Hill" | Gary Shimokawa | Story by : Tom Tenowich & Mark Fink; Teleplay by : Michael Poryes & Bennett Tramer | December 9, 1989 | 6311 | N/A |
Zack starts high school at Bayside hoping to finally win his longtime crush, Kelly Kapowski, the prettiest cheerleader in school. However, A.C. Slater, a new transfer student, hits on her, resulting in a love triangle between Zack, Slater, and Kelly.
| 16 | 16 | "Save That Tiger" | Don Barnhart | Brett Dewey & Ronald B. Solomon | December 16, 1989 | 6329 | N/A |
Zack and Slater are involved in the annual prank war against Valley, which takes place the same time as the big cheerleading competition between the schools. Screech is the Bayside mascot and has an important part in Bayside's routine. However, after Zack and Slater kidnap Valley's mascot, two students from Valley kidnap Screech. Fortunately, their plan is ruined when the fake mascot ends up winning the competition for Bayside.

=== Season 2 (1990) ===
| No. overall | No. in season | Title | Directed by | Written by | Original release date | Prod. code | Viewers (millions) |
|---|---|---|---|---|---|---|---|
| 17 | 1 | "The Prom" | Don Barnhart | Peter Engel & Tom Tenowich | September 8, 1990 | 6332 | N/A |
When Zack gets to go to Prom with Kelly his dream seems to be fulfilled. However, Kelly finds out that her father has lost his job, causing a financial hardship that makes her unable to make it to the prom; but Zack makes it up to her in the end. Meanwhile, Jessie and Slater end up going to prom together, while Screech finally manages to take Lisa on a date to the movies. However, Lisa's constant chattering on their movie date becomes a nuisance and therefore a turnoff for Screech and he declines to take her to the prom. At the end of the episode, Zack and Kelly have their first kiss.
| 18 | 2 | "Zack's War" | Don Barnhart | Sam Greenbaum | September 15, 1990 | 6339 | N/A |
In order to make Zack change his ways, Mr. Belding forces Zack to join the Army Cadet Corps. Zack manages to persuade the others to join him, but he leaves them high and dry when they are not prepared for a competition.
| 19 | 3 | "Save the Max" | Don Barnhart | Gary Goldstein | September 22, 1990 | 6334 | N/A |
Zack and Screech discover the room where Bayside High's radio station KKTY was housed. The station had been pulled off the air because of Mr. Belding's antics as DJ during his Bayside student days, but the gang successfully convinces him to put KKTY back on the air. Zack becomes the main DJ, Kelly hosts "Desire Hour," Screech tells creepy stories on his "Mystery Theater", Lisa hosts the gossip segment, Jessie reads the latest news, and Slater ineptly handles sports. Slater quits when he finds out everyone thinks he is a bad sports announcer, but returns just when the gang needs him most.
| 20 | 4 | "Driver's Education" | Don Barnhart | Michael Poryes | September 29, 1990 | 6336 | N/A |
Fearing that Kelly would rather go steady with Slater if he learned to drive first, Zack plots to make Slater fail his driver's training. This leads to Slater having an accident in the practice car and a locker falling on Kelly. When she realizes who was behind the crash, she makes out her injury to be worse than it really is.
| 21 | 5 | "House Party" | Don Barnhart | Brett Dewey & Ronald B. Solomon | October 6, 1990 | 6342 | N/A |
When Screech's parents leave him alone in the house while they visit Graceland, the gang accidentally breaks his mother's Elvis statue. In order to afford a replacement, they plan to hold a fund-raising party so they can hurry to get the statue before his mother returns home and finds out what happened.
| 22 | 6 | "Blind Dates" | Don Barnhart | R.J. Colleary | October 13, 1990 | 6331 | N/A |
Mr. Belding's niece Penny is in town, and he forces Zack to take her out. Zack, however, wants to attend Kelly's party instead, so he makes Screech pretend to be him and take Penny out. Meanwhile, Lisa finds a date for Jessie, but Jessie is too self-conscious about her height to have a good time.
| 23 | 7 | "Rent-a-Pop" | Don Barnhart | R.J. Colleary | October 20, 1990 | 6337 | N/A |
In order to raise money for a school ski trip, the gang decides to organize a carnival. Zack has been failing, and Mr. Belding wants to conduct an interview between himself, Zack, and Zack's father. Not wanting Belding to call his father anymore, Zack hires an actor to impersonate his dad, but the plan backfires when the real Mr. Morris and Mr. Belding bump into each other at the carnival.
| 24 | 8 | "Miss Bayside" | Don Barnhart | Bennett Tramer | October 27, 1990 | 6338 | N/A |
Zack and Slater make a bet on who can win the Miss Bayside Beauty Pageant and Zack bets that Screech will win. Jessie protests about the pageant and thinks that a male winner would be fair.
| 25 | 9 | "Jessie's Song" | Don Barnhart | Peter Engel & Tom Tenowich | November 3, 1990 | 6343 | N/A |
Jessie turns to caffeine pills as a result of the pressure with midterms and her singing group, ignoring Slater's warning that the pills can damage her health. When Zack finds out about her problem, he cancels her performance and rushes to her side.
| 26 | 10 | "Model Students" | Don Barnhart | R.J. Colleary & Michael Poryes | November 10, 1990 | 6340 | N/A |
Zack convinces Belding to fire the nerds who run the school store so that the gang can reopen it as a "cool" store. Unfortunately, no one wants to come in; so as a scheme to attract customers, Zack and Screech secretly take pictures of the girls' swim team to sell in "The Girls of Bayside" calendars. A professional model photographer happens to see the calendar, and invites the girls for a professional photo shoot; but only Kelly is picked for an on-location shoot in Paris, which leaves Zack out in the cold.
| 27 | 11 | "1-900-Crushed" | Don Barnhart | Brett Dewey & Ronald B. Solomon | November 17, 1990 | 6335 | N/A |
Zack's new money-making idea is to give relationship advice to fellow students, with the help of Screech and Lisa. However, the plan fails when Lisa quits and he has to take over. As a result, he gives bad advice to various students, and is forced to deal with the consequences when a case of mixed-up phone calls puts Zack in the middle of Kelly and her sister.
| 28 | 12 | "Close Encounters of the Nerd Kind" | Don Barnhart | Jeffrey J. Sachs | November 23, 1990 | 6327 | N/A |
Zack and Slater break the school's professional camera and hatch a plan to make quick money to pay for a replacement before Belding finds out. A tabloid is offering money for photos of real aliens, so they dress Screech up as an alien in order to fool the tabloid. A special agent with the government is more than convinced that Screech is an alien.
| 29 | 13 | "Running Zack" | Don Barnhart | Jeffrey J. Sachs | November 24, 1990 | 6341 | N/A |
Zack fails his family heritage presentation. Unless he can make it up, he is off the track team. His teacher Miss Wentworth arranges a tutor for Zack named Chief Henry, who happens to be a Native American. Zack soon learns about his own Native American heritage, but does not feel like going to the upcoming track rally when tragedy strikes.
| 30 | 14 | "The Babysitters" | Don Barnhart | Larry Balmagia | December 1, 1990 | 6322 | N/A |
Kelly leaves her infant brother Billy in the care of the gang while she gets her school picture taken. However, while they are babysitting, Kelly injures her arm, and the gang is left to care for baby Billy throughout the school day.
| 31 | 15 | "The Fabulous Belding Boys" | Don Barnhart | Peter Engel & Tom Tenowich | December 9, 1990 | 6344 | 8.3 |
The gang find themselves in trouble when an obnoxious teacher bans them from the class field trip unless they pass a test. On the day of the test, the teacher does not show up, so Mr. Belding's younger brother, Rod, takes over and offers to take the class on a special field trip. This makes him very popular, but Mr. Belding acts very coolly towards Rod and Zack accuses him of being jealous of his brother. However, on the evening when the class trip is due to leave, Rod's true colors are revealed when Zack overhears that he has made other plans to spend the weekend with a stewardess. Mr. Belding breaks the disappointing news that Rod will not be taking everyone on the trip, but offers to step in and take them instead. While the gang is unaware of the truth, Zack tells Mr. Belding that he knows about Rod's date and apologizes for being rude to him.
| 32 | 16 | "From Nurse to Worse" | Don Barnhart | Bennett Tramer | December 15, 1990 | 6333 | N/A |
Zack asks Kelly to go steady with him, but while she is thinking it over, he falls for a (supposedly) new student (Nancy Valen), only to discover that she is actually the new school nurse. Meanwhile, Slater is afraid of getting his flu shot.
| 33 | 17 | "Breaking Up Is Hard to Undo" | Don Barnhart | Jeffrey J. Sachs | December 16, 1990 | 6346 | 8.0 |
It is a bad day for couples as Zack and Kelly and Slater and Jessie respectively split up after a series of disagreements. Although neither party will be the first to apologize, they are miserable without each other. After Belding also has a tiff with his wife, the guys are left spending time with him while he is kicked out of his house, making matters worse. Eventually Zack and Slater realize they must help Belding reconcile with his wife, while reconciling with Kelly and Jessie.
| 34 | 18 | "Glee Club" | Don Barnhart | Bennett Tramer | December 23, 1990 | 6345 | N/A |
The gang joins Screech's girlfriend Violet (Tori Spelling in one of her early roles) in the glee club in order to go to a competition in Hawaii. It seems that shy Violet is the only one with a voice, aside from Jessie (who caught Lisa's flu and is unable to sing). After Screech makes a fool of himself in front of Violet's parents, they forbid Screech to see her, and she quits the glee club.

=== Season 3 (1991) ===
| No. overall | No. in season | Title | Directed by | Written by | Original release date | Prod. code |
|---|---|---|---|---|---|---|
| 35 | 1 | "The Last Dance" | Don Barnhart | Jeffrey J. Sachs | September 14, 1991 | 6349 |
Desperate to afford a stunning dress for the Bayside Costume Ball, Kelly takes a job as a waitress at The Max. While working, she spends significant time with the new, older manager, Jeff Hunter (Patrick Muldoon), Despite her long-term relationship with Zack, Kelly finds herself increasingly attracted to Jeff’s maturity and charm. As the chemistry between Kelly and Jeff becomes undeniable and leads to a kiss, Kelly is consumed by guilt and distances herself from an increasingly worried Zack. The tension reaches its breaking point at the Costume Ball. When a distant Kelly is named Queen of the dance alongside Zack, she calls him "Jeff" and Zack realizes in horror what that means. In a heartbreaking scene on the terrace, Kelly tells a devastated Zack that their relationship is over. The episode ends with the iconic, somber visual of Zack watching Kelly walk back inside to the dance celebration as he looks off in complete shock.
| 36 | 2 | "Zack's Birthday" | Don Barnhart | Bennett Tramer | September 14, 1991 | 6366 |
The gang begins their summer vacation working at the Malibu Sands Beach Club. While most are excited, they quickly find themselves at odds with the resort's demanding and short-tempered owner, Leon Carosi(Ernie Sabella). Meanwhile, Zack immediately sets his sights on Carosi's daughter, Stacey (Leah Remini) who has just arrived from New York. The "romance" gets off to a rocky start due to Stacey's abrasive and arrogant "New York attitude," which leaves Zack questioning his interest. Stacey finds fault with everything Zack does but when he gets angry and accurately says she's treating him and everyone else badly out of contempt and disgust, she starts to change her attitude. When the group throws a surprise birthday party for Zack at the club and Leon Carosi shows up with plans to fire them, Stacey lies that she OK'd the party. She tells them to clean up and smiles at a happily surprised Zack, making it clear that things are going to get interesting between them.
| 37 | 3 | "The Aftermath" | Don Barnhart | Brett Dewey & Ronald B. Solomon | September 21, 1991 | 6350 |
Following their breakup at the costume ball, Zack is badly hurt and barely interested in going to Lisa's birthday party (which she invites everyone too, though she unsuccessfully tries to convince Screech to not show up). When the gang takes Zack to the movies to cheer him up, they run into Kelly and Jeff on their date. In retaliation, Zack begins a series of "rebound dates" with multiple girls, intentionally flaunting his social life to make Kelly jealous. The conflict deepens when the rest of the gang—Slater, Jessie, Lisa, and Screech—openly side with Zack. Because they see Jeff as an outsider and an "older man" who broke up the school's golden couple, they begin to ostracize Kelly. But Zack's angry and pointed responses turn them against him, and he both yells at Belding (who sternly tells a silenced Zack they're going to have to have a discussion) and initially refuses to attend Lisa's party despite Screech saying the group wants him there. The tension culminates at Lisa’s Sweet Sixteen party. Kelly initially hesitates to attend due to the group's hostility, but she eventually shows up with Jeff. After seeing Kelly’s genuine sadness over being ignored by her friends, Zack has a change of heart. He tells Kelly he is sorry for his actions, they reconcile as friends, and Zack tells Jeff that Kelly is a great person who deserves to be treated well. An attractive redhead flirts with Zack and he smiles and begins talking to her as the party continues and the episode ends.
| 38 | 4 | "The Game" | Don Barnhart | Jeffrey J. Sachs | September 21, 1991 | 6367 |
At the Malibu Sands Beach Club, Zack Morris becomes obsessed with a vintage 1966 Mustang. After discovering the car belongs to his mean-spirited boss, Mr. Carosi (pre-The Lion King Ernie Sabella) Zack convinces him to sell it for a lower price by betting on the outcome of the annual beach volleyball match against the rival North Beach Club. Carosi agrees but warns that if the gang loses, they will all lose their jobs. To ensure a win, Zack recruits a tall, talented ringer named Gary. However, Gary shows a distracting interest in Kelly, and disaster strikes when Screech accidentally breaks Gary's foot right before the tournament. Desperate for a sixth player, the gang cycles through several ineffective replacements before Stacey Carosi (Leah Remini) steps up to play and the group pulls off a miracle comeback to restore the club's honor.
| 39 | 5 | "Operation Zack" | Don Barnhart | Jeffrey J. Sachs | September 28, 1991 | 6358 |
Before a critical basketball game against rival school Valley, Zack Morris suffers a knee injury after Mr. Belding inadvertently trips him when the team is running out of the locker room. Zack is rushed to the hospital, where he discovers that Lisa Turtle is volunteering as a candy-striper under the supervision of her surgeon mom. When Zack learns he requires surgery for torn cartilage, he becomes paralyzed by fear. In an attempt to scope out the operating room and ease his nerves, Zack poses as a surgeon, wearing a gown and mask to sneak into restricted areas. His ruse is eventually discovered, but Lisa manages to calm him down by revealing that her mother will be performing the procedure. Meanwhile, a guilt-ridden Mr. Belding offers to help Zack with his schoolwork by taking a math test in his place, though he only manages to score a mediocre C−. Lisa gets Zack to chill and he has successful surgery on his knee, though the basketball team lost the big game.
| 40 | 6 | "Fourth of July" | Don Barnhart | Scott Spencer Gorden | September 28, 1991 | 6368 |
As the Fourth of July approaches at the Malibu Sands Beach Club, owner Leon Carosi appoints Zack Morris as a judge for the annual Miss Liberty beauty pageant. The situation becomes complicated when Carosi pulls Zack aside and demands he rig the contest in favor of his daughter, Stacey threatening Zack's summer employment if she doesn't win. Despite the pressure from Carosi, Zack chooses to judge fairly. Kelly is crowned Miss Liberty, causing Carosio to fire him and also an initial rift between Zack and Stacey when she stupidly believes Screech's wrongful idea that Zack threw the competition to Kelly because he wants to win her back romantically. However, Stacey eventually admits she didn't want to win through cheating, and Carosi backs down when Stacey makes it clear he's rehired and the matter isn't up for debate. Meanwhile, the beach club staff and members compete in a series of "endurance games," providing a competitive backdrop to the holiday festivities.
| 41 | 7 | "Check Your Mate" | Don Barnhart | Brett Dewey & Ronald B. Solomon | October 5, 1991 | 6360 |
As the annual chess championship competition between Bayside and rival school Valley approaching, Valley decides to sabotage Screech, Bayside's undefeated champion. Screech attributes his success to a "lucky beret" given to him by his girlfriend, Violet. Valley sends a student to pose as a reporter for Chess Boy magazine to lurer Screech into a trap and steal the beret" causing him to lose his confidence and concentration Meanwhile, Zack and Slater have placed a large bet on the match. To ensure their victory after Screech's slump, they attempt to pull "the old switcheroo" with Valley's star player, a Russian exchange student named Peter Brehvnez. They kidnap the student and plan to have Zack pose as the opponent to throw the game. However, Screech eventually realizes that his skill comes from within and from Violet's support, not a hat. He insists on playing the match fairly against his actual opponent, ultimately proving his talent without the need for the lucky charm or Zack's schemes. Note: At one point when he is posting as Peter, Zack begins muttering in a foreign language that some fans thought was Russian but is actually Dutch; Mark-Paul Gosselaar has half-Dutch parentage and speaks the language fluently in real life.
| 42 | 8 | "My Boyfriend's Back" | Don Barnhart | Jeffrey J. Sachs | October 5, 1991 | 6370 |
As Zack Morris and Stacey Carosi begin to grow closer during their summer at the Malibu Sands Beach Club, their relationship is tested by the arrival of Stacey's ex-boyfriend, Craig Strand (Benjamin King). Craig, a wealthy college student from the East Coast, immediately intimidates Zack, who begins to feel inferior and "heartbroken". Zack attempts to compete with Craig for Stacey's attention, but his jealousy nearly jeopardizes their connection. Ultimately, Stacey affirms her preference for Zack over Craig’s prestige. In the episode's B-plot, the beach club organizes its annual ATV race. Jessie Spano, motivated by her activist nature and desire for gender equality, enters the competition to prove to Slater and the others that she is "as good as a man" in a high-speed race. While the race provides a high-energy backdrop to the weekend's events, it serves to highlight the ongoing competitive dynamic between Jessie and Slater.
| 43 | 9 | "Fake IDs" | Don Barnhart | Brett Dewey & Ronald B. Solomon | October 19, 1991 | 6353 |
Zack falls for a college girl named Danielle when she drops by The Max to use the phone because she is stranded with a flat tire. In an attempt to impress her, Zack offers to change Danielle's tire, lies about his age and then makes fake IDs so that he, Slater, and Screech can sneak into The Attic, an over-18 nightclub where Danielle is a regular patron. However, they get a big surprise when they see Kelly's boyfriend Jeff there dancing with another girl. Kelly snarls at Zack to GTFO when he tells her what he saw, but she begins to suspect Jeff and then learns from a tearful Screech that Zack was telling the truth. The group resolves to return en masse to The Attic to prove Jeff is a scumbag. They do; and just as they are about to bust Jeff, Kelly unexpectedly shows up and catches Jeff embracing the other girl in a slow dance. Kelly then confronts Jeff and breaks up with him. During all of this, Zack's mom finds out that the boys had snuck out from a supposed sleepover to go to The Attic. Just as Danielle shows up at The Attic, Zack's mom is there to bust the boys. She doesn't get too mad but coolly tells them they can return to the place when they turn 18 and not sooner.
| 44 | 10 | "Boss Lady" | Don Barnhart | Bennett Tramer | October 19, 1991 | 6369 |
When Leon Carosi leaves the Malibu Sands Beach Club for a day of business, he places his daughter, Stacey, in charge of the resort. Although Stacey is initially confident, she quickly becomes overwhelmed by a series of management disasters. The primary crisis involves a double booking: Stacey discovers her father has scheduled the Thornhills' 50th Wedding Anniversary and a Sweet Sixteen party for a girl named Jeanie Richter in the same room at the same time. Zack Morris assists by attempting to negotiate with both parties, eventually convincing the younger group to move their celebration to the beach. However, the situation worsens when the entire kitchen staff goes on strike over a pay dispute, forcing Zack and the gang—none of whom have professional culinary skills—to take over the kitchen to feed both groups of guests.
| 45 | 11 | "Pipe Dreams" | Don Barnhart | Peter Engel & Tom Tenowich | October 26, 1991 | 6361 |
While construction workers are installing a new goalpost on the Bayside High football field, they strike oil. The discovery causes immediate "oil fever" among the students and staff. Zack and the gang (except for the environmentally conscious Jessie) become obsessed with the potential riches, imagining a future where they are incredibly wealthy and Bayside is a luxury estate. The excitement is short-lived when the drilling leads to a major oil spill that contaminates the school's football field and a nearby nature pond. The disaster directly impacts a biology project the class was working on involving pond animals. Zack, who had been nursing an injured white duck named Becky back to health, finds her covered in oil following the spill. Despite the gang's desperate efforts to clean the animals, Becky dies as Zack tearfully blames himself and Screech quietly tells him "Don't worry about Becky, Zack. She's where the oil can't hurt her anymore." Realizing that the environmental and personal costs far outweigh the financial benefits, the students turn against the drilling. They interrupt a meeting between school officials and oil executives with a presentation showing how the drilling equipment would destroy the campus. Ultimately, the gang convinces Mr. Belding and the school board to cancel the drilling contract to save their school's environment.
| 46 | 12 | "The Last Weekend" | Don Barnhart | Brett Dewey & Ronald B. Solomon | October 26, 1991 | 6371 |
The final weekend at the Malibu Sands Beach Club brings a bittersweet reality for Zack Morris and Stacey Carosi. As the summer season winds down, the young couple is forced to confront the impending end of their whirlwind romance, with Stacey preparing to leave California to return home to Boston for the school year. The emotional tension of their fast-approaching departure reaches a boiling point when Stacey's father Leon Carosi accidentally discovers their secret relationship. Furious that his employee is dating his daughter, Carosi instigates a heated, explosive argument with Stacey. Deeply hurt by her father's rigid control and refusal to trust her judgment, Stacey packs her bags and stays with Kelly, Jessie and Lisa. Distraught by the family rift he inadvertently caused, Zack realizes he must fix the situation before the summer concludes. During a scheduled Malibu Sands staff photograph, Zack cleverly orchestrates a public confrontation and reconciliation between the estranged father and daughter. Zack's intervention forces Carosi to confront his own behavior, helping Leon realize that his harsh boundaries and micromanagement were actively pushing Stacey away rather than keeping her safe. Softening his stance, Carosi genuinely apologizes to Stacey, repairing their bond just in time for her departure and also apologizing to Zack and giving him the tips he'd previously withheld. With her family drama resolved, Stacey shares a tender, mature final farewell with Zack, concluding their memorable summer at the beach club on a high note. The rest of the group shows up on the beach to comfort Zack and they walk together one last time down the shore before heading home.
| 47 | 13 | "The Wicked Stepbrother" | Don Barnhart | Brett Dewey & Ronald B. Solomon | November 2, 1991 | 6351 |
| 48 | 14 | "The Wicked Stepbrother" | Don Barnhart | Peter Engel & Tom Tenowich | November 2, 1991 | 6352 |
Jessie Spano's family dynamic undergoes a stressful shift when her father remarries and she is introduced to her new stepbrother from New York, Eric (Joshua Hoffman). While Eric initially appears charming to the rest of the gang, Jessie quickly discovers that he possesses a manipulative dark side, frequently using blackmail and underhanded tactics to exploit his peers and always get his way around Bayside High. Meanwhile, Eric takes a strong romantic liking to Lisa Turtle and begins aggressively pursuing her. Seeking to teach the arrogant newcomer a lesson and protect their friends, Zack Morris and A.C. Slater orchestrate an elaborate revenge scheme. Knowing that Principal Mr. Belding is fiercely protective of his shiny, brand-new red convertible, Zack and Slater secretly swipe the keys and bait Eric into "borrowing" the vehicle to impress Lisa on their upcoming date, planning to photograph him behind the wheel as definitive proof to get him expelled. However, the prank takes a dangerous and unexpected turn. Wanting to show off, Eric unexpectedly lets Lisa take the wheel of the sports car. As Zack and Slater wait in ambush to snap their incriminating photo, the blinding, high-powered flash of their camera completely disorients Lisa in the darkness. Blinded by the sudden light, Lisa loses control of the convertible and crashes directly into a nearby wall. The accident leaves the gang horrified, forcing Zack, Slater, and Eric to face immediate, severe consequences for their reckless behavior, while Eric's true colors are finally exposed to both the students and Mr. Belding. Eric learns that Zack and Slater paid Lisa off to go out with him in order to get him into trouble for driving Mr. Belding's car, and when Eric confronts Lisa about it, she is crushed--because she actually fell in love with him. To get back at the guys, Eric has the auto mechanic class take the totaled car apart. When Jessie finds out, she confronts him about it and demands that he fix the car. When Eric refuses and gives her trouble by calling her a "chick," Jessie gives him a black eye for being a sexist and tells him that she wants him out of her life. To make amends, Eric puts Belding's car back together himself so that Zack and Slater do not get into trouble, and apologizes. Regardless of what happened, Lisa tells Eric that she likes him and would like another date with him.
| 49 | 15 | "Date Auction" | Don Barnhart | Jeffrey J. Sachs | November 9, 1991 | 6354 |
Zack Morris forms the central narrative of the episode when Bayside High School hosts a charity "date auction" to raise funds for new cheerleading uniforms. Driven by his usual vanity, Zack expects to be won by one of the most popular girls in school. Instead, Wendy Parks (Judy Carmen), an overweight student, shocks Zack by placing a massive $100 bid to win a date with him. Embarrassed by his own superficial anxieties and desperate to avoid being seen with her in public, Zack launches an elaborate scheme to escape his commitment. He crafts a multitude of fabricated excuses and even fakes a severe back injury, complete with a heating pad, to get out of the date. Wendy eventually uncovers his blatant deception. She confronts Zack directly, telling he's a liar and she doesn't want to be around him if he's that vile, ending their date on her terms. A guilt-ridden Zack is forced to reflect on his behavior, realizing how cruel his actions were and that honesty would have been far better than cowardice. To make genuine amends, Zack tracks Wendy down at the school dance. He delivers a heartfelt apology, admits his faults, and asks her to be his date for real. Wendy accepts his apology and they share a dance, allowing Zack to redeem himself. Meanwhile, Jessie Spano heavily protests the event as a demeaning "meat market" and forbids the girls from bidding on her boyfriend, A.C. Slater. The plan backfires when Kelly Kapowski inadvertently wins Slater to help the cheerleaders, while Jessie ends up stuck with Samuel "Screech" Powers. Lisa Turtle completely changes her high-fashion image to secure a date with Brian (Patrick J. Dancy), an intellectual student, telling Kelly that she might be putting on an act but "this phony has a boyfriend--the real Lisa didn't". However, she promptly dumps him during their date when he displays an arrogant attitude and calls her friends stupid.
| 50 | 16 | "All in the Mall" | Don Barnhart | Scott Spencer Gorden | November 9, 1991 | 6365 |
The Bayside gang embarks on a high-stakes mission when they camp out overnight at the local shopping mall to secure coveted tickets for an upcoming, sold-out U2 concert. After a series of blunders—largely due to Samuel "Screech" Powers losing his place in the box office line—the group misses out on buying the tickets. Frustrated and empty-handed, things take a bizarre turn when the gang discovers a bag containing $5,000 in cash abandoned in a mall phone booth. Rather than turning the money over to mall security, Zack Morris hatches a desperate scalping scheme. He decides to use the found cash to purchase a massive block of premium concert tickets from other patrons, planning to resell them at a massive profit to recoup their losses. However, the plan goes awry when two intimidating, shady-looking men appear to be aggressively hunting for the missing bag. Believing the men are dangerous "mobsters" out for revenge, the gang is thrown into a state of panic. A chaotic, high-speed chase ensues across the shopping center as Zack, A.C. Slater, Kelly Kapowski, and Lisa Turtle scramble to evade their pursuers. They resort to increasingly absurd hiding tactics, which include seeking refuge inside a sporting goods store's camping tent and posing as frozen mannequins in a bridal shop display window. Eventually, the group is cornered by the suspicious men alongside a mall security guard. Terrified and prepared for the worst, Zack surrenders the money. Instead of face-to-face conflict, the men suddenly reveal the hidden truth: they are actually actors for the hidden-camera television show Candid Video. The abandoned cash, the pursuit, and the unhelpful security guard were all a highly orchestrated prank filmed for national television. As a reward for being good sports, the show's producers present the ecstatic gang with five front-row tickets to the U2 concert, completely restoring peace to the Bayside group (once they tell Zack they will NOT sell those tickets on the black market).
| 51 | 17 | "SATs" | Don Barnhart | Bennett Tramer | November 16, 1991 | 6356 |
As the Bayside High students prepare for their S.A.T.s, Jessie Spano is consumed by the need to achieve a near-perfect score for admission into her dream school, Stansbury University. To her shock and devastation, the results reveal she scored 1205, while the usually underachieving Zack Morris scored an elite 1502; Kelly and Slater are happy with their decent scores while Screech is pleased to have gotten a very good score (though lower than Zack's). The situation escalates when a recruiter from Stansbury visits Bayside. The recruiter is immediately impressed by Zack’s high score and offers A.C. Slater a football scholarship, but shows zero interest in Jessie due to her lower score. Jessie's self-esteem plummeting leads Zack to hatch a scheme to help her. He hires James, an actor and waiter from The Max, to impersonate a recruiter from Harvard University. James's role is to aggressively "scout" Jessie in front of the Stansbury recruiter, making her appear like a highly sought-after candidate and forcing Stansbury to compete for her enrollment. Parallel to the college drama, Zack attempts to use his newfound academic "prestige" to woo a fellow student named Heather after she asks him for help with a study night. The episode concludes with Jessie learning to value her worth beyond a single test score, though the group's manipulation of the recruiter serves as a comedic resolution to her admission anxiety.
| 52 | 18 | "Palm Springs Weekend" | Don Barnhart | Brett Dewey & Ronald B. Solomon | November 16, 1991 | 6372 |
| 53 | 19 | "Palm Springs Weekend" | Don Barnhart | Jeffrey J. Sachs | November 23, 1991 | 6373 |
The Bayside High gang travels on location to Palm Springs when Jessie Spano's father, David Spano (George McDaniel), invites the group to the luxury JW Marriott Desert Springs Resort, which he manages. Jessie is initially ecstatic to celebrate her father's upcoming wedding, but her joy turns to shock and deep resentment when she arrives and discovers that he is marrying Leslie (Barbra Brighton), a much younger aerobics instructor. Jessie is furious and resolves to sabotage the wedding. Meanwhile, A.C. Slater crosses paths with Christina (Eva Loseth), a guest at the hotel who secretly turns out to be a wealthy foreign princess from Europe. Slater attempts to romance her but becomes deeply intimidated after having dinner with her highly conservative, royal father. Zack Morris and Kelly Kapowski take advantage of the scenic vacation setting to spend intimate time together. The trip causes them to seriously rethink their post-breakup relationship as they ponder whether to officially renew their romance. The drama in Palm Springs reaches its climax as David Spano's wedding day arrives, but Jessie holds firm on her promise to boycott the ceremony. However, her father tells her bluntly he will marry the woman he loves and that is final, and Jessie says she's not going to the wedding. Zack, who like Lisa was horrified by Jessie's actions, finds her planning to flee and asks her questions that lead her to admit she felt her father loved Leslie more than her and she lost her bearings over it. A regretful Jessie returns for the wedding, sincerely apologizing to an accepting Leslie and being happy for her and her dad's new life together. Meanwhile, the other storylines at the desert resort wrap up: Zack and Kelly share a romantic kiss by the resort pool, but they ultimately have a mature conversation and decide that they are better off remaining close friends for the rest of high school rather than forcing a relationship. Slater decides to look past his intimidation and successfully asks Princess Christina to be his wedding date before she departs the hotel to return to Europe with her father. "Screech" Powers uses a lame pick-up book to impress women, but when a pretty girl in a bikini genuinely expresses interest in him, he flubs the book's advice so badly that she angrily pushes him into the pool and walks away. With the wedding successfully completed and the friendships fully intact, the unified Bayside gang packs up their bags and heads home to California.
| 54 | 20 | "Hold Me Tight" | Don Barnhart | Jim Parker | November 23, 1991 | 6355 |
Zack falls for a new girl named Kristy who wants to become part of the wrestling team but is barred from the team because of her gender. The gang decides to help her out. But when Lisa makes a hint that Slater and Kristy may be carrying on, Jessie walks in on the moment they prepare do to a wrestling move. It's now up to Slater. Meanwhile on a date with Zack, Kristy puts a guy from Valley in a headlock and shows to be "manlier" than Zack, which hurts his pride and he breaks up with her later. Slater realizes that Jessie is jealous when she takes back her statement that girls have a right to wrestle, and they get into an argument. In the end, Slater, Jessie, Zack, and Kristy all make up at their wrestling meet.
| 55 | 21 | "No Hope with Dope" | Don Barnhart | Scott Spencer Gorden | November 30, 1991 | 6362 |
Bayside is chosen by a Hollywood teen idol movie star as the location to shoot an anti-drug commercial. The gang is set to star in the commercial; however, when the gang learns that someone has been supposedly smoking pot at Bayside, they soon realize that things are not going to be as easy as they thought. The gang later feels deceived after learning that the star himself uses drugs and pressures Kelly to try pot as well. Zack encourages Kelly not to go through with it and tells the star to leave. However, Mr. Belding saves the day when he brings in an old friend, who happened to be Brandon Tartikoff, the then chairman of NBC, to do the commercial.
| 56 | 22 | "Rockumentary" | Don Barnhart | Peter Engel & Tom Tenowich | November 30, 1991 | 6364 |
Casey Kasem tells the story of how Zack's band, "The Zack Attack," got together and their rise to fame. It ends up being a dream that Zack is having before the group's band starts rehearsals for the bar mitzvah event they're going to playing that weekend.
| 57 | 23 | "Cut Day" | Don Barnhart | Bennett Tramer | December 7, 1991 | 6359 |
It is "Cut Day" at Bayside High, an unofficial school holiday where students skip classes to spend the day at the beach or playing games. While the rest of the gang is excited to participate, Zack Morris faces a major problem: Mr. Belding (whose overall attitude towards Cut Day is very chill, based on students taking responsibility for being absent without excuses from their parents) warns him that he already has nine such absences, and a tenth will result in automatic suspension. Zack makes a $100 bet with a cocky Slater that he can pull off Cut Day, even when Slater tells him he has to show up throughout the day and not just once. Throughout the day, Zack uses elaborate schemes, disguises, and the help of a student named Franklin to dodge Belding, who is stalking the hallways specifically to catch Zack in the act. In the B-plot, Jessie Spano decides to skip Cut Day to focus on activism: along with new student council member/activist Graham, she stages a protest to stop a polystyrene foam cups delivery at their school cafeteria. She finds he likes Graham and this leads to a surprisingly mature relationship discussion, and decision, between herself and Slater.
| 58 | 24 | "Home for Christmas" | Don Barnhart | Tom Tenowich | December 7, 1991 | 6374 |
| 59 | 25 | "Home for Christmas" | Don Barnhart | Bennett Tramer | December 14, 1991 | 6375 |
Part 1: During the holiday season, the Bayside gang takes on seasonal jobs at the mall, where Zack's mother, Melanie Morris, is directing a community production of "A Christmas Carol". Zack and Screech realize a man using the mall bathroom is homeless and leaves money for him. Zack falls for Laura, a new employee at the upscale clothing store, Kelly works at. He makes a thoughtless remark about the man using the money for alcohol that angers Laura, though she accepts his apology and is later happy when Zack takes her to see the mall's Santa Claus. Jessie and Slater don't enjoy their work as a Santa's assistant who gets insulted by a nasty kid and a truly incompetent gift-wrapper. In the latter role, Zack and Screech are there when Slater finishes his shift and they prepare to head out, but they find the man from the bathroom is unconscious and give him CPR and get help. They then head to the hospital to perform a holiday skit for sick kids, and then find out where the man they helped is to see how he's doing. They find that Laura is his daughter. Part 2: Zack and his mom invite Lauara and her dad Frank over for a holiday dinner, and Frank moves them a ton when he quietly relates the sad story of how he became homeless and why he can't get a new job. Kelly and Laura's Scrooge-like clothing store boss Mr. Moody initially won't give her time to perform in Mrs. Morris' play, but Zack convinces him by turning much of the play into a spoken-word ad set for his store. Kelly had arranged to have a sportscoat that Frank desperately needed put aside so she could buy it for him and Laura. Moody sees the coat missing and no receipt and tells Laura she stole it and he's calling the police. Laura flees in horror, but when Zack and Kelly realize what Moody has done they're FURIOUS at him, with one look of complete disgust and contempt from Kelly leading Moody to hang up the phone in shame. The gang finds Laura and her dad's rundown car at a Christmas tree lot, and invites them to join the group at the Morris household for Christmas. Kelly shows up with a completely apologetic Mr. Moody, who both tells Laura he's sorry and proves it by giving Frank the coat and telling Laura she's got work to return to. The group celebrates a very special holiday together.
| 60 | 26 | "Mystery Weekend" | Don Barnhart | Ronald B. Solomon & Brett Dewey | December 21, 1991 | 6363 |
As part of Lisa's prize for winning a radio contest, the gang travels to Knockwood Manor, a secluded mansion, for a murder mystery weekend retreat. The host, Steven Jameson III, explains that the first person to solve the mystery will win a $500 prize and warns the group to "suspect everyone". The weekend features a classic cast of characters, including Bartholomew the butler, Janette the French maid, and Victor the piano player. However, the game takes a sinister turn when a real murder attempt appears to be made on Jameson, who subsequently disappears. Strange occurrences follow as several people begin to vanish one by one, leaving the gang genuinely terrified. Zack Morris eventually finds himself framed for both the "murder" and thievery, and he must play detective to clear his name and uncover the truth.

=== Season 4 (1992–93) ===
| No. overall | No. in season | Title | Directed by | Written by | Original release date | Prod. code | Viewers (millions) |
|---|---|---|---|---|---|---|---|
| 61 | 1 | "The Fight" | Don Barnhart | Scott Spencer Gorden | September 12, 1992 | 6376 | N/A |
Senior year begins at Bayside High School, but the longtime bond between best friends Zack Morris and A.C. Slater is immediately pushed to its breaking point when they both fall for Joanna, a beautiful new transfer student from Idaho. Rather than stepping aside, both boys aggressively pursue her, sparking a bitter and escalating love triangle. The rivalry peaks when Joanna unwittingly accepts separate dates with both guys. Driven by jealousy, Zack and Slater intentionally crash each other's dates with her. The confrontation quickly boils over the following day at school, leading to a brutal, uncharacteristic fistfight between the two best friends in the Bayside hallway. The physical altercation shocks the student body and disgusts Joanna, who promptly rejects both of them for their immature and aggressive behavior. Meanwhile, Lisa Turtle navigates her own awkward social dilemma. Excited to attend Bayside's high-profile Senior Kick-Off Party, she secures a date with a handsome boy she assumes is an upperclassman. To her horror, she discovers right before the event that her date is actually just a freshman. Desperate to maintain her cool, high-fashion senior reputation, Lisa spends the evening trying to hide the age gap from her peers. At the Senior Kick-Off Party hosted at The Max, Zack and Slater cross paths again. The tension explodes into a second attempted brawl right next to the refreshment table. Principal Mr. Belding—who has been proudly sporting a brand-new, poorly concealed toupee to celebrate the new school year—rushes in to aggressively break up the fight. During the physical scramble to separate the boys, Mr. Belding's hairpiece flies off his head and lands directly into the party's punch bowl. The sheer absurdity of the moment breaks the tension, causing Zack and Slater to burst into laughter. Realizing how foolishly they have been acting over a girl, the two best friends officially reconcile and mend their friendship.
| 62 | 2 | "Student Teacher Week" | Don Barnhart | Tom Tenowich | September 12, 1992 | 6379 | N/A |
Bayside High observes "Student-Teacher Week," where students swap roles with the faculty to learn about leadership and responsibility. Zack is appointed as Principal, Kelly takes over as a history teacher, and Screech and Lisa are assigned as gym teachers. The experiment quickly turns sour when Zack finds himself caught in a conflict of interest; Slater, struggling with his studies, manipulates Zack into using his principal powers to cancel a difficult history test scheduled for Friday. Kelly finds out that Slater lied and puts the test back on the schedule, but the entire class walks out and Kelly angrily tells Zack he ruined her chance to prove she could teach. Zack then stuns Slater and the football team class-cutting leaders by suspending them all from playing in the big game, and his denouncement of how Slater treated Kelly leads Slater to apologize and dissolves the tension. When the football players all take and genuinely pass the test during the 1st quarter, they're cleared to play and help lead Bayside to a victory.
| 63 | 3 | "Screech's Spaghetti Sauce" | Don Barnhart | Story by : Jeffrey J. Sachs; Teleplay by : Brett Dewey & Ronald B. Solomon | September 19, 1992 | 6382 | N/A |
After discovering that Screech has access to his grandmother’s delicious "secret" spaghetti sauce, the gang decides to bottle and sell it to their classmates. The business becomes an overnight success, and with his newfound wealth and status, Screech begins dating Robin(Soleil Moon Frye), a beautiful and wealthy girl. Zack quickly grows suspicious of Robin’s intentions and warns Screech that she is a "gold digger" only interested in his profits. Screech initially refuses to believe him, but his heart is broken when he overhears a private conversation where Robin and a friend mock him and confirm she is indeed using him for his money. Simultaneously, the group is served a cease-and-desist notice after it is discovered that the "secret" family recipe was actually taken directly from a widely available cookbook. Screech admits his grandmother was a poor cook who relied on the book, forcing the gang to shut down their business immediately. Zack then cooks (heh) up a plan that cons Robin into thinking the sauce is successful, leading her to give all of her money to buy it and then break up with a grateful Screech.
| 64 | 4 | "The New Girl" | Don Barnhart | Story by : Peter Engel; Teleplay by : Scott Spencer Gorden & Bennett Tramer | September 19, 1992 | 6451 | N/A |
As a new school year begins, a biker girl named Tori Scott (Leanna Creel), a tough, leather-jacket-wearing transfer student, arrives at Bayside on her motorcycle and makes an enemy of Zack after she takes his long-held "seniority" parking space on her motorcycle. Their rivalry intensifies when they are paired for an advertising project, which Zack is convinced will be a disaster and is only salvaged by his quick thinking. Meanwhile, Lisa acts like a tyrannical jerk while planning the welcome-back dance and only chills out when Tori says she'll help her if Lisa ditches her rotten attitude. Lisa realizes Tori likes Zack and both encourages her and tells a shocked Zack that Tori's issues on the project came from spending time helping Lisa with the dance. Zack and Tori both apologize and end the episode on good terms. Note: Kelly Kapowski (Tiffani Amber Thiessen) and Jessie Spano (Elizabeth Berkley) do not appear.
| 65 | 5 | "The Bayside Triangle" | Don Barnhart | Jeffrey J. Sachs | September 26, 1992 | 6377 | N/A |
Zack helps Lisa put on a fashion show to impress a visiting recruiter from FIT, the fashion school in which Lisa is interested after graduation. However, Zack and Lisa soon start to fall for each other after they share a passionate kiss at Lisa's house, where Zack was trying on an outfit Lisa designed. The next day, before the fashion show (which was held at The Max), Zack and Lisa decided to kiss again to determine if there were any serious feelings between them. Screech, with a rose in his hand to give to Lisa for good luck, walks in on them in the middle of their kiss and is devastated. To retaliate, Screech, who served as the announcer for the show, ties in cruel remarks about Zack and Lisa with the regular fashion commentary, making the fashion show a disaster. However, in spite of it all, the fashion school recruiter likes Lisa's designs and decides to support her for enrollment at FIT. Screech wants to fight Zack but Zack refuses, saying he didn't mean to hurt Screech and won't date Lisa if that hurts him, which in turn leads Lisa to angrily tell Screech that his actions are unacceptable. Screech realizes that he has to accept that Lisa will never love him and that he must move on, and sincerely apologizes to both her and Zack.
| 66 | 6 | "Teen-Line" | Don Barnhart | Jeffrey J. Sachs | September 26, 1992 | 6452 | N/A |
Bayside High establishes "Teen-Line," a student-run crisis hotline monitored by Principal Belding. Zack Morris volunteers and forms a close bond with Melissa, a frequent caller dealing with feelings of isolation. Breaking the hotline’s strict anonymity rules, Zack arranges to meet Melissa at The Max. Upon arrival, he is visibly surprised to discover that Melissa uses a wheelchair. Anxious to prove he is not bothered by her disability, Zack begins heavily overcompensating. He takes her out on dates but constantly points out her wheelchair to others, demanding special treatment, extra space, and immediate service everywhere they go. His overly attentive, protective, and patronizing behavior deeply embarrasses Melissa. She finally confronts him, explaining that his forced chivalry is just as isolating as rejection because she wants to be treated as a peer, not a patient. Meanwhile, Samuel "Screech" Powers volunteers for a local "big brother" mentorship program. He is paired with an incredibly rambunctious, high-energy young boy who completely overwhelms Screech by running amok, pulling pranks, and causing chaos around the school. At the school dance, Zack takes Melissa's feedback to heart. He stops his overprotective behavior and treats her normally, allowing them to truly connect on equal terms. The two share a dance and reconcile, while Screech finally manages to find common ground and rein in his chaotic little brother. Note: Kelly Kapowski (Tiffani Amber Thiessen) and Jessie Spano (Elizabeth Berkley) do not appear.
| 67 | 7 | "Masquerade Ball" | Don Barnhart | Jeffrey Sachs | October 3, 1992 | 6453 | N/A |
As Bayside High’s annual masquerade ball approaches, Zack and Slater enter into a wager to see who can be the first to kiss the new girl, Tori Scott. However, the plan goes awry when Screech accidentally alerts Tori to the scheme, leading her to plan her own revenge against both boys. Meanwhile, Lisa discovers a series of anonymous love letters in her locker and becomes convinced that her secret admirer is Zack. In reality, the letters are from Screech, whose attempts at romance cause further chaos when Mr. Belding mistakenly intercepts one of the notes and assumes it was written to him by a nearsighted teacher, Mrs. Culpepper. At the ball, Tori tricks Zack and Slater by telling them she will be dressed as Gumby, but she arranges for Screech to wear the costume instead. This leads to a climactic mix-up where Slater, dressed as an astronaut, accidentally kisses Screech. Ultimately, Zack confesses to Tori that he intentionally avoided winning the bet because he has developed genuine feelings for her and could not bear to hurt her. While Tori appreciates his honesty, she reminds both him and Slater that they needed to be taught a lesson for their behavior. Note: Kelly Kapowski (Tiffani Amber Thiessen) and Jessie Spano (Elizabeth Berkley) do not appear.
| 68 | 8 | "Day of Detention" | Don Barnhart | Jeffrey J. Sachs | October 3, 1992 | 6461 | N/A |
Zack discovers a radio contest offering a grand prize trip to Hawaii, but the final call-in time coincides with a Saturday detention given to him by Mr. Belding. Desperate to be near a phone, Zack recruits the gang to stage a series of distractions to help him "escape" the classroom. However, each attempt—ranging from Lisa faking a fashion emergency to Slater causing a gym distraction—backfires, resulting in the entire group being sentenced to detention alongside him. Stuck together, the friends must find a way to reach a phone line before the contest ends, while the key to winning the contest weirdly lies with Belding's new hobby of pruning miniature Japanese bonsai trees. Note: Kelly Kapowski (Tiffani Amber Thiessen) and Jessie Spano (Elizabeth Berkley) do not appear.
| 69 | 9 | "Wrestling with the Future" | Don Barnhart | Brett Dewey & Ronald B. Solomon | October 10, 1992 | 6378 | N/A |
A.C. Slater is thrilled to receive a full wrestling scholarship from the University of Iowa. However, his excitement is overshadowed by his father, Major Slater (Gerald Castillo), who has already arranged a high-stakes interview for him to attend West Point. Afraid to disappoint his father, Slater enlists Zack to sabotage the West Point interview by impersonating him and acting as obnoxious as possible in front of a visiting congressman. The plan fails when Major Slater discovers the ruse, leading to a rare serious confrontation where Slater finally asserts his desire to choose his own path at Iowa. Slater and his dad mend fences with help from Zack. Meanwhile, the B-plot follows Jessie Spano, who joins the cheerleading squad to pad her college applications. Despite the extra effort, she becomes convinced she will be rejected by every school, while Screech easily gets into nearly every university he applied to—including Princeton and USC—thanks to his high GPA.
| 70 | 10 | "Drinking and Driving" | Don Barnhart | Brett Dewey & Ronald B. Solomon | October 10, 1992 | 6454 | N/A |
The Bayside High gang faces a harrowing wake-up call when they celebrate Lisa Turtle winning Homecoming Queen. Following the football game, the group attends a chaotic, toga-themed victory party. Peer pressure takes over, and several members of the group—including Zack Morris and A.C. Slater—succumb to drinking alcohol. Tori and Screech don't drink because Tori doesn't believe in it and Screech is way too sensitive to stimulants to try even a beer. When it is time to leave, both Lisa and Slater openly admit they are far too intoxicated to drive. Ignoring an available sober driver in Screech Powers, Zack arrogantly insists he is fine to take the wheel and demands the keys to Lisa's mother's Mercedes-Benz. While driving home buzzed, Zack narrowly avoids an oncoming vehicle. Distracted as he turns his head to boast to Slater about the near-miss, Zack completely loses control of the vehicle and crashes directly into a telephone pole. While everyone miraculously survives the crash, Slater suffers an arm injury severe enough to force him out of the biggest championship football game of the year. Terribly panicked, the friends have the smashed luxury car towed to Zack's house to hide it from Lisa's out-of-town parents. They successfully raise $1,000 for quick bodywork and repairs to entirely mask the external wreckage, fully intending to hide that alcohol was ever involved. However, their elaborate cover-up scheme completely unravels when the repaired car refuses to start. Caught red-handed as the lies pile up, the teens are forced to confess everything. Instead of getting away with the crime, Zack and his friends face the devastating reality of a DWI: as their deeply disappointed, enraged parents throw the book at them, forcing the teens to finally take real accountability for their dangerous actions. Note: Kelly Kapowski (Tiffani Amber Thiessen) and Jessie Spano (Elizabeth Berkley) do not appear.
| 71 | 11 | "Love Machine" | Don Barnhart | Scott Spencer Gorden | October 17, 1992 | 6357 | N/A |
Screech and Kelly invent a "Love Machine" for the science fair that measures a couple's compatibility through physical sensors. When Slater's ex-girlfriend from Berlin, Jennifer (Kanin Howell), arrives at Bayside for a visit, the group decides to test the machine. To Jessie’s devastation, the device indicates that Slater and Jennifer are a perfect match, while Slater and Jessie’s score is incredibly low.Feeling guilty about the awkward tension, Slater asks Zack to take Jennifer out on a date to keep her occupied. However, the plan causes friction when Zack actually starts to enjoy Jennifer's company, and Slater becomes jealous. Ultimately, the gang discovers that the Love Machine was malfunctioning due to Screech's tinkering, and Slater reaffirms his commitment to Jessie. *Lisa does not appear in this episode and this takes place in season 3.
| 72 | 12 | "Class Rings" | Don Barnhart | Brett Dewey & Ronald B. Solomon | October 17, 1992 | 6458 | N/A |
Zack is appointed as the chairman for the senior class ring committee and tasked with purchasing rings for the entire graduating class. Looking for a bargain, Zack is lured into a "too good to be true" deal by a shady salesman named Gem Diamond, who sells him a bulk order of gold rings at a steep discount. However, the gang soon realizes the rings are fakes when their fingers start turning green. Zack finds Screech's delusional new "relationship" with his girlfriend Tori is the key to both resolving that & scaring Gem Diamond into giving them the high-quality rings they purchased in the first place. In the subplot, Tori and Lisa make a bet to see if Tori can endure a date with Screech without being mean to him, with Lisa having to grit her teeth and be polite to Screech for the rest of the school year if Tori "wins". Although Tori does win the bet by remaining patient, her kindness causes Screech to mistakenly fall in love with her. Tori is eventually forced to let him down gently, explaining that she only intended to be his friend. He never figures it out but "ends" things with Tori when he becomes popular with Bayside's female students due to him scaring Gem Diamond. Note: Kelly Kapowski (Tiffani Amber Thiessen) and Jessie Spano (Elizabeth Berkley) do not appear.
| 73 | 13 | "Isn't It Romantic?" | Don Barnhart | Peter Engel & Tom Tenowich | October 24, 1992 | 6384 | N/A |
It is Valentine's Day and the gang reminisces about past romances through clips from past episodes.
| 74 | 14 | "The Will" | Don Barnhart | Scott Spencer Gorden | October 24, 1992 | 6457 | N/A |
When a beloved Bayside alumnus passes away and leaves a $10,000 inheritance to the school, a fierce "battle of the sexes" erupts over how the money should be spent. The boys, led by Zack and Slater, argue the funds should go toward new equipment for boys' sports. Meanwhile, the girls, led by Lisa and Tori, demand the money also be used for girls' sports because Zack and Slater felt that the men should receive all but a few dollars of the benefaction. To settle the dispute, Mr. Belding organizes a series of competitions between the "Blue Team" (boys) and the "Red Team" (girls). The rivalry turns into an all-out war after Zack uses unethical tactics to win, including sabotaging the girls' oven during a bake-off contest. After the girls discover the cheating and plan their revenge, a limbo contest settles the matter fairly. Note: Kelly Kapowski (Tiffani Amber Thiessen) and Jessie Spano (Elizabeth Berkley) do not appear.
| 75 | 15 | "The Teacher's Strike" | Don Barnhart | Scott Spencer Gorden | October 31, 1992 | 6380 | N/A |
In order to secure a three-day weekend for a ski trip, Zack and Slater orchestrate a teacher's strike at Bayside High. Zack uses a fraudulent audio recording to trick the lead negotiator, Mr. Tuttle (Jack Angeles), into believing that Principal Belding has a personal vendetta against the faculty. The scheme is so successful that the school is shut down, but the gang soon realizes their victory has a major downside: the strike threatens to cancel the annual Academic Bowl championship against their rivals from Valley High, which Lisa and Jessie and especially Screech had worked hard to get ready for. As the strike continues, Screech—the team's star player—falls ill with the flu, leaving Zack to take his place in the competition. Realizing they have jeopardized their chances of an academic victory, Zack and Slater must scramble to convince the disenchanted teachers to end their strike and return to the classroom. Meanwhile, Jessie fills in for the absent Kelly at her job at The Max, dealing with the stress of the strike's impact on their education. Slater cons the Valley High nerds and sets the stage for Bayside to win the Academic Bowl. *Kelly Kapowski does not appear in this episode and is mentioned she is out of town.
| 76 | 16 | "Slater's Sister" | Don Barnhart | Bennett Tramer | October 31, 1992 | 6456 | N/A |
The Bayside High hierarchy is thrown into chaos when A.C. Slater's (Mario Lopez) younger sister, J.B., transfers to the school and immediately catches the eye of Zack Morris. Knowing Slater's intense protective nature, Zack and J.B. begin a secret romance to avoid his wrath. They slip away for hidden dates at The Max, but their secrecy is short-lived. Slater eventually discovers the relationship and becomes instantly hostile. Having spent years witnessing Zack’s history of womanizing, elaborate schemes, and short-lived conquests firsthand, Slater is terrified that his sister will be treated as just another temporary target of Zack's charm. Refusing to let his sister get hurt, Slater goes to extreme lengths to protect her, including trailing the couple and orchestrating elaborate disruptions to sabotage their romantic dates. The mounting tension between the two best friends quickly boils over in the Bayside hallway. Fed up with the constant surveillance, Zack confronts Slater, leading to a heated argument and a physical confrontation that requires Principal Mr. Belding to intervene. The conflict is only resolved when Zack sits down with Slater and proves his feelings for J.B. are completely genuine, promising to treat her with the utmost respect. Slater then arranges for his sister and Zack to enjoy a date at the sock hop dance. Note: Kelly Kapowski (Tiffani Amber Thiessen) and Jessie Spano (Elizabeth Berkley) do not appear.
| 77 | 17 | "The Senior Prom" | Don Barnhart | Bennett Tramer | November 7, 1992 | 6381 | N/A |
The senior prom is coming up and ticket sales are sparse due to the bad national economy, until a cheap solution is found. However, things go wrong when Zack finds out that Kelly has a date to the prom and sabotages it by telling her would-be date that her family is violent to her boyfriends, thereby scaring her date away. Kelly then accepts a date with Zack--that is, until she finds out that he crashed her original date, and then Kelly furiously turns Zack down. Meanwhile, Screech decides to ask other girls to prom rather than Lisa, but Lisa asks him after Screech kept getting rejected, and he accepts. Slater and Jessie get locked in the boiler room and miss most of the prom until Kelly and Zack rescue them. In familiar pairings, the six friends have a lovely last dance as couples.
| 78 | 18 | "The Video Yearbook" | Don Barnhart | Brett Dewey & Ronald B. Solomon | November 7, 1992 | 6347 | N/A |
Bayside High's student body decides to modernize tradition when the gang volunteers to produce a first-of-its-kind, video version of the school's annual high school yearbook, Armed with a camcorder, the group sets out around campus to capture authentic student testimonials, candid club activities, and memorable senior moments. Zack Morris, however, quickly spies a lucrative business opportunity. Shifting the project's original intent, Zack secretively launches a money-making scheme to repurpose the footage into customized commercial dating videos, planning to sell the clips to lonely singles across the school. Zack instructs Samuel "Screech" Powers to help edit the stock footage into a highly marketable database of Bayside's most eligible students.The illicit dating-video business becomes an instant financial success, but Zack's greed completely backfires due to a careless production mistake. While assembling the final tape, an oblivious Screech accidentally includes Kelly Kapowski in the dating catalogue. Zack regrets his actions and is conned into making amends.*this takes place season 2.
| 79 | 19 | "Screech's Birthday" | Don Barnhart | Stephen Langford | November 14, 1992 | 6330 | N/A |
Screech becomes deeply upset when he realizes that all of his friends, and even his robot Kevin, have forgotten his birthday. To make it up to him, Zack and the gang plan a late surprise party to be held in Mr. Belding’s office. To ensure the hallways are clear for their preparations, Zack orchestrates a scheme to get the current hall monitor fired so that Screech can take over the position. However, the plan backfires when Screech takes his new authority too seriously; he becomes a strict, power-hungry hall monitor and begins issuing detentions to his own friends for minor infractions. This jeopardizes the party as most of the guests end up stuck in detention. Zack eventually uses the school's PA system to summon everyone to the office, where they finally surprise a repentant Screech just before Mr. Belding returns. Note: This episode was produced early in the series' Season 1 run and held over for years before being aired.
| 80 | 20 | "Snow White and the Seven Dorks" | Don Barnhart | Bennett Tramer | November 14, 1992 | 6348 | N/A |
Bayside High's drama department takes a modern twist when the gang organizes and stars in a hip-hop musical adaptation of the classic fairy tale "Snow White and the Seven Dwarfs" Zack Morris lands the role of the Prince, while Jessie Spano is cast as Snow White. The production runs smoothly until the cast reaches the final scene rehearsals. Upon realizing that the script requires them to share a romantic, true-love's kiss to awaken Snow White, Zack and Jessie are suddenly struck by unexpected awkwardness. As they rehearse the scene repeatedly, the platonic lines blur, and the two lifelong friends begin to question whether they harbor secret, deeper romantic feelings for one another. Their sudden mutual identity crisis does not go unnoticed. The unresolved sexual tension quickly alienates their respective romantic partners, causing a massive rift within the friend group. A.C. Slater becomes furious with Zack's apparent betrayal, while Kelly Kapowski is deeply hurt by Zack's wavering devotion, resulting in a dramatic, temporary fallout among the four main characters right before opening night. Ultimately, the pressure of the live performance forces everyone to confront reality. During the final show, the scripted kiss happens, but the moment clarifies their true feelings rather than complicating them: Zack and Jessie both realize that their spark was merely performance anxiety and that they function strictly as close friends. Following the final curtain call, the couples reconcile. Jessie reaffirms her commitment to a relieved Slater, while Zack aggressively pursues Kelly to apologize, successfully rekindling his love for her and restoring peace to the Bayside gang. *This takes place in season 2.
| 81 | 21 | "Earthquake!" | Don Barnhart | Scott Spencer Gorden | November 21, 1992 | 6455 | N/A |
Chaos strikes Bayside High School when a sudden earthquake hits the Pacific Palisades area, causing immediate structural damage and trapping Zack Morris, Tori Scott, and a heavily pregnant Becky Belding (Deborah Harmon) inside the school's faulty elevator. The situation rapidly escalates from an inconvenient entrapment to a high-stakes emergency when the physical shock of the earthquake induces sudden, active labor for Mrs. Belding. With the elevator completely jammed between floors and emergency first responders delayed by widespread citywide earthquake damage, Zack and Tori realize they are entirely on their own. Panicked but forced to act, Zack and Tori must put aside their usual teenage worries to step up as makeshift medical assistants. Guided by Mrs. Belding's breathing exercises and their own frantic intuition, the two teens work together to keep her calm, comfortable, and safe in the cramped, dusty elevator shaft. Meanwhile, a frantic Principal Mr. Belding works tirelessly with the school's maintenance crew from the hallway, desperately trying to pry open the heavy elevator doors before his child arrives. After a tense, emotional delivery inside the elevator, Zack and Tori successfully help deliver a healthy baby boy. By the time the power is restored and the doors are finally forced open, a relieved Mr. Belding is reunited with his wife and new son, whom they gratefully name Zack Belding in honor of Zack's heroic, cool-headed assistance during the crisis. Note: Kelly Kapowski (Tiffani Amber Thiessen) and Jessie Spano (Elizabeth Berkley) do not appear.
| 82 | 22 | "Best Summer of My Life" | Don Barnhart | Jeffrey J. Sachs | November 21, 1992 | 6460 | N/A |
Zack Morris takes a rare authorized day off from Bayside High School at the behest of his mom, spending his afternoon relaxing and reflecting on the gang's unforgettable summer adventures before their senior year. Through a series of extensive flashbacks, Zack reminisces about their time working at the Malibu Sands Beach Club under the strict management of Leon Carosi, as well as going to Palm Springs for the wedding of Jessie's father. Back in the present day, Zack, A.C. Slater, Lisa Turtle, and Samuel "Screech" Powers navigate the quiet school day without their two friends. The framing narrative serves to bridge the gap between production cycles, anchoring the series' continuity while acknowledging the shifting dynamics of the core group as they head toward graduation. Screech and Lisa both show up for a little while at Zack's to commiserate with him and Slater about how much they loved their summer experiences. Note: Kelly Kapowski (Tiffani Amber Thiessen) and Jessie Spano (Elizabeth Berkley) appear only in archive footage, as they had left the series before production and the episode was made into a de facto clip show with the core regulars who were present for all of Season 4--this fulfilled the show's contractual obligations with NBC.
| 83 | 23 | "Slater's Friend" | Don Barnhart | Larry Balmagia & Scott Spencer Gordon | November 28, 1992 | 6328 | N/A |
Slater goes to San Diego for the weekend and leaves his beloved pet chameleon, Artie, in the care of Screech. Screech in turn has leaves Artie in Zack’s care due to Screech’s pets trying to eat Artie. However, things soon go awry when the gang realizes that Artie is dead. Panicked, Zack and Screech attempt to find a replacement lizard that looks exactly like Artie before Slater returns. The situation becomes a chaotic game of hide-and-seek throughout Bayside High as they try to keep the truth from Slater while avoiding the suspicious gaze of Mr. Belding. Ultimately, Slater learns the truth and the gang has a ceremony honoring Artie. Note: This episode was also produced early in the series' Season 1 run and held over for years before being aired.
| 84 | 24 | "School Song" | Don Barnhart | Bennett Tramer | November 28, 1992 | 6459 | N/A |
With graduation approaching, Principal Belding announces a competition for the students to write a new school song for Bayside High. Realizing his high school legacy consists mostly of detentions and scams, Zack becomes obsessed with winning so he can be remembered for a positive contribution after everyone points out what a jerk he's been and he (briefly) feels bad about it. To ensure his victory, Zack begins a series of sabotage campaigns against his friends' entries: he ruins the tape for the Glee Club, destroys Slater’s "Heavy Metal" version of the song, and tampers with Screech’s unusual arrangement. After his friends discover his underhanded tactics and ruin his performance in a showdown with Screech's song, Zack apologizes and successfully asks if he can join them to sing Screech's song (which Slater, Lisa and Tori have entirely rewritten but kept Screech's name as the artist on). The episode ends with the group performing the unified song at a school assembly and joining hands together when the performance is complete. Note: Kelly Kapowski (Tiffani Amber Thiessen) and Jessie Spano (Elizabeth Berkley) do not appear in this episode, which was the final episode that was produced with Leeana Creel appearing as Tori.
| 85 | 25 | "The Time Capsule" | Don Barnhart | Peter Engel & Tom Tenowich | December 5, 1992 | 6385 | N/A |
Ten years into the future, (in Bayside High School's latest class of students makes a historic discovery when they unearth a hidden school time capsule. Inside, they find an old VHS tape containing a video diary recorded a decade earlier. Intrigued by the find, Principal Mr. Belding sets up a television to play the footage for the new teenagers, introducing them to the legendary exploits of the school's most famous alumni. The characters are very thinly veiled new versions of Zack, Slater, Screech, Lisa and Jessie (there are 5 of them and none resemble Kelly Kapowski in any way). The video capsule transports the audience into a nostalgic (through clips from past episodes) format, treating the new students to a compilation of the massive ups and downs experienced by Zack Morris, A.C. Slater, Kelly, Jessie Spano, Lisa Turtle, and Samuel "Screech" Powers. Through the archival footage, the new class witnesses the old gang's most iconic moments, including their elaborate schemes, dramatic romantic breakups, high-stakes school dances, and the deep, enduring friendships that defined their era at Bayside. As the tape concludes, the retrospective footage serves as an emotional bridge between generations, inspiring the current class to make the most of their own high school years while Mr. Belding warmly reflects on the timeless spirit of the Bayside legacy.
| 86 | 26 | "Graduation" | Don Barnhart | Story by : Tom Tenowich; Teleplay by : Scott Spencer Gorden & Bennett Tramer | May 22, 1993 | 6383 | 9.4 |
As the seniors prepare for commencement, Zack is stunned to learn from Mr. Belding that he is one credit short of graduating, since he once dropped a 1-credit performing arts class and never made it up. To earn the necessary credit and avoid summer school, he plots his way into participation in the school's ballet recital. Meanwhile, Jessie is eager to be valedictorian but Belding tells a shocked Screech and impressed Lisa that Screech beat her out. Screech then lies that he cheated and tells a completely confused Belding and Lisa that he doesn't want the honor; he then tells Lisa that Jessie would be devastated to lose and also is a much better person to inspire the student body than he and his "squeaky voice" are. The group joins Zack in an emergency performance that earns Zack his credit and graduation place, while Lisa gets genuinely angry when Jessie mocks Screech and tells her that Screech selflessly gave up his Valedictorian spot to her. Jessie then has Screech speak, and in turn he has Zack come up and give an emotional and inspiring message of love for his friends. They all receive the diplomas from an emotional Mr. Belding and celebrate as the new Class of 1993! *Note: While this became the 1st regular-length SBTB episode to air during the prime-time 8-11PM EST period (and the 2nd overall, after the "Hawaiian Style" TV movie in 1992), it was held until the 1992-93 Nielsen season was over, and isn't officially considered part of any TV season's airings.

== Hawaiian Style (1992) ==
| Title | Directed by | Written by | Original release date | Viewers (millions) |
|---|---|---|---|---|
| Saved by the Bell: Hawaiian Style | Don Barnhart | Bennett Tramer | November 27, 1992 | 17.0 |
Kelly's grandfather (Dean Jones), invites the kids to stay at his hotel in Hawaii. However, someone else is out to buy his land and build a hotel/resort complex, and the group has to save it.

== The College Years (1993–94) ==
| No. | Title | Directed by | Written by | Original release date | Prod. code | Viewers (millions) |
|---|---|---|---|---|---|---|
| 1 | "Pilot" | Jeff Melman | Elaine Aronson | May 22, 1993 | 60500 | 9.4 |
| 2 | "Guess Who's Coming to College?" | Jeff Melman | Andrew Guerdat & Steven Kreinberg | September 14, 1993 | 60501 | 14.2 |
| 3 | "Zack, Lies & Videotape" | Jeff Melman | Mark Fink | September 14, 1993 | 60502 | 14.2 |
| 4 | "Rush Week" | Jeff Melman | Jeffrey Duteil | September 21, 1993 | 60503 | 12.8 |
| 5 | "Slater's War" | Jeff Melman | Renee Palyo | September 28, 1993 | 60504 | 11.0 |
| 6 | "The Homecoming" | Jeff Melman | Debra Fasciano | October 5, 1993 | 60505 | 12.0 |
| 7 | "The Poker Game" | Jeff Melman | Mark Fink | October 12, 1993 | 60506 | 12.8 |
| 8 | "Prof. Zack" | Jeff Melman | Andrew Guerdat & Steve Kreinberg | October 19, 1993 | 60507 | 11.8 |
| 9 | "Screech Love" | Jeff Melman | Jeffrey Duteil | October 26, 1993 | 60508 | 10.9 |
| 10 | "Dr. Kelly" | Jeff Melman | Noah Taft | November 2, 1993 | 60509 | 10.2 |
| 11 | "A Thanksgiving Story" | Jeff Melman | Brett Dewey & Ronald B. Solomon | November 23, 1993 | 60510 | 10.4 |
| 12 | "Teacher's Pet" | Jeff Melman | Debra Fasciano | December 7, 1993 | 60512 | 8.5 |
| 13 | "Kelly and the Professor" | Jeff Melman | Mark Fink | December 14, 1993 | 60513 | 10.7 |
| 14 | "A Question of Ethics" | Jeff Melman | Renee Palyo | December 21, 1993 | 60511 | 9.8 |
| 15 | "The Rave" | Jeff Melman | Jeffrey Duteil | January 4, 1994 | 60514 | 9.4 |
| 16 | "Bedside Manner" | Jeff Melman | Renee Palyo | January 11, 1994 | 60515 | 9.0 |
| 17 | "Love and Death" | Jeff Melman | Andrew Guerdat & Steve Kreinberg | January 22, 1994 | 60516 | 6.5 |
| 18 | "Marry Me" | Jeff Melman | Noah Taft | February 8, 1994 | 60517 | 13.5 |
| 19 | "Wedding Plans" | Jeff Melman | Bennett Tramer | February 8, 1994 | 60518 | 13.5 |

== Wedding in Las Vegas (1994) ==
| Title | Directed by | Written by | Original release date | Viewers (millions) |
|---|---|---|---|---|
| Saved by the Bell: Wedding in Las Vegas | Jeffrey Melman | Mark Fink | October 7, 1994 | 12.5 |
Picking up where The College Years left off, Zack and Kelly prepare to get married in Las Vegas, even though Zack's parents are against it and Kelly's parents can't afford it.

== See also ==
- List of Saved by the Bell: The New Class episodes
