= Edward Blatchford =

American actor

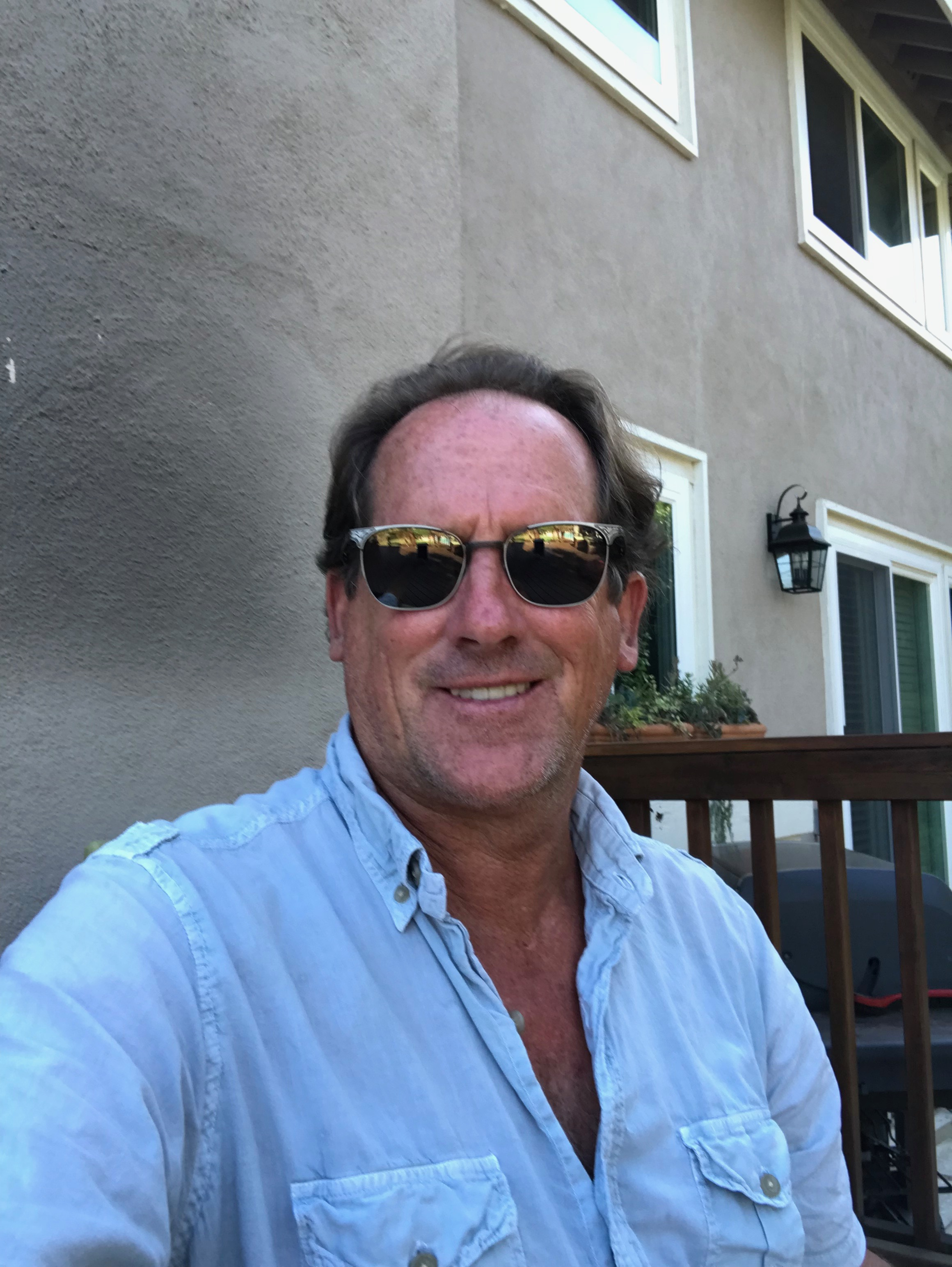
- Born: February 6, 1957 (age 69)
- Other name: Ed Blatchford
- Education: DePaul University
- Occupation: Actor
- Years active: 1978–present

Edward Blatchford (born September 1, 1955) is an American actor best known for his role as Peter Collins from 1998 to 2000 in the sitcom Malibu, CA, produced by Peter Engel. He also worked with Engel on three other television series, guest starring in Saved by the Bell, Hang Time and City Guys. Blatchford was one of the founding members of Chicago's American Blues Theatre.

He also guest starred in the series Crime Story, The Adventures of Brisco County, Jr. and JAG. His film credits include The Last of the Mohicans (1992) and Nowhere to Run (1993).

== Career after acting ==
=== Saved by the Belding ===
In 2010, Blatchford wrote and starred in the independent short film Saved by the Belding. The film parodied his guest appearance on Saved by the Bell where he played Rod Belding, brother of Richard Belding (Dennis Haskins).

==== Rainmaker ====
Ed was nominated for a 2016 Joseph Jefferson (Equity) Award for Director of a Play for "The Rainmaker" at the American Blues Theater in Chicago, Illinois.

== Personal life ==
Blatchford currently works as a real estate agent for Surterre Properties in Newport Beach, California. He has a Bachelor of Arts degree from College of Santa Fe and a Master of Fine Arts degree from DePaul University. He is married to Laura and they have a daughter, Alexandra.

== Filmography ==
Year	Title	Role	Notes
1978	Convoy	Roger	
1989	Music Box	Young Man	
1991	Son of the Morning Star	Lt. Col. William W. Cooke	
1992	We're Talking Serious Money	Biker #1	
1992	The Last of the Mohicans	Jack Winthrop	
1993	Nowhere to Run	Sheriff Lonnie Poole	
1993	Twenty Bucks	Ex-Hippie	
