= The Chosen One: Legend of the Raven =

- VHS Cover
- Directed by: Lawrence Lanoff
- Written by: Khara Bromiley; Sam Rappaport
- Produced by: Corey Kiefer; Lawrence Lanoff; Hoke M. Rose
- Starring: Carmen Electra; Lawrence Lanoff
- Cinematography: Robert C. New
- Music by: Keith Arem
- Distributed by: Troma Films
- Release date: May 26, 1998
- Running time: 88 minutes
- Country: United States
- Language: English

The Chosen One: Legend of the Raven is a 1998 B-movie directed by Lawrence Lanoff, co-written by Khara Bromiley and Sam Rappaport, and distributed by Troma Films. It stars Carmen Electra and Lawrence Lanoff.

== Plot ==
When a serial killer mysteriously and savagely murders a young native woman in rural Los Angeles County, her sister McKenna (Carmen Electra) must replace her as the keeper of an amulet, the sacred crescent. Reluctantly, McKenna accepts the role of chosen one. With the amulet and after the rigors of the ritual, she takes on the spirit and powers of the raven, the good forces in the battle against evil, the wolf. McKenna's powers include a thirst for milk and tremendous sexual energy, which she unleashes on her former boyfriend, Henry, a cop. The spirit of the wolf inhabits Rose, Henry's jilted lover. Rose wreaks havoc of her own before a final showdown with the chosen one.

== Cast ==
- Conrad Bachman as Carl
- Tim Bagley as Ricky Dean
- Carmen Electra as McKenna Ray / "The Raven"
- Billy A. Fox as The Bartender (credited as Billy Fox)
- Shauna Sand as Emma
- Lawrence Lanoff as Bob "Serial Killer Bob"
- Michael Lathon as John
- Leslie Hunt as Tammy (credited as Leslie C. Meenen)
- Dave Oliver as Henry
- Charles Santore as Dougie
- Frank Salsedo as Papi
- Michael Stadvec as Cole
- Priscilla Inga Taylor as Betz (credited as Priscilla Taylor)
- Debra K. Beatty as Nora (credited as Debra Xavier)
