= Nowhere to Run (1993 film) =

- Theatrical release poster
- Directed by: Robert Harmon
- Screenplay by: Joe Eszterhas; Leslie Bohem; Randy Feldman
- Story by: Joe Eszterhas; Richard Marquand
- Produced by: Gary Adelson; Craig Baumgarten
- Starring: Jean-Claude Van Damme; Rosanna Arquette; Kieran Culkin; Ted Levine; Joss Ackland
- Cinematography: David Gribble
- Edited by: Mark Helfrich; Zach Staenberg
- Music by: Mark Isham
- Production company: Columbia Pictures
- Distributed by: Sony Pictures Releasing
- Release dates: January 14, 1993 (Singapore); January 15, 1993 (United States)
- Running time: 94 minutes
- Country: United States
- Language: English
- Budget: $15 million
- Box office: $64 million

Nowhere to Run is a 1993 American action film directed by Robert Harmon. The film stars Jean-Claude Van Damme, Rosanna Arquette, Kieran Culkin, Ted Levine, and Joss Ackland.

Nowhere to Run was released in the United States on January 15, 1993, by Columbia Pictures. The film was the second collaboration between Van Damme and producer Craig Baumgarten, after Universal Soldier (1992).

== Plot ==
A prison bus flips on the road when it's cut off by a car driven by Billy, who frees prisoner and partner-in-crime Sam Gillen. They escape in the car but Billy is fatally shot by a guard.

Sam buys some food from a roadside store and camps near a pond. He finds the money from their latest heist in the car trunk and listens to a tape recording left by Billy before pushing the car into the pond. That night, Sam sneaks up to a nearby house and sees a woman and her two children inside. He breaks in but is nearly discovered by one of the children; he takes a salt shaker and leaves. The next night he breaks in again to return it; the boy named Mike (nicknamed "Mookie") finds Sam's campsite.

Nearby demolition from real estate development disturbs Clydie Anderson, the owner of the home. Corrupt developer Franklin Hale seeks to drive her off the land with the help of his lackey, Mr. Dunston, and the local sheriff, Lonnie Poole, who is dating her.

One night, goons attack Clydie and her children, but Sam arrives and fights them off. He claims he is camping and hunting on her land, and Clydie insinuates that he is not welcome, but later offers him shelter in her barn out of gratitude.

Sam also purchases her dead husband's old Triumph Bonneville motorcycle and repairs it with Mookie's help. Later Sam thwarts an attempt by Hale to ruin Clydie's farmland by coating it with oil.

A town council meeting gets heated when another resident, Tom, refuses to sell his land to Hale. That night, his goons burn down Tom's barn. Mookie (who discovers the fire) awakens Sam; Sam saves Tom and puts out the fire with their water tower before their fuel tanks can ignite, further angering Hale.

Noticing that Clydie is taking a liking to Sam, Lonnie beats him and demands he leave. While tending his wounds, Clydie and Sam have sex. Lonnie continues to grow suspicious of Sam and Clydie's relationship; he finds out Sam is a fugitive and informs Clydie. Sam tells her that he and Billy robbed a bank, but Billy killed a guard defending him. He got caught, while his friend escaped.

Clydie tells him to leave, so Sam returns to his campsite. Hale enlists the sheriff's department to hunt him down, so he leads them on a motorcycle chase and ultimately escapes, but returns to Clydie.

Running out of time and growing desperate, Hale and Dunston go to Clydie's house with guns and force her to sign over the land. Sam arrives just in time to stop them from burning down the house and kills Dunston with a revolver. California Highway Patrol officers arrive and arrest Hale (who is holding Clydie at gunpoint).

Sam allows Lonnie to arrest him, having decided to stop running. He and Clydie confess their love to each other and Sam promises to return to her and the children.

== Cast ==
- Jean-Claude Van Damme as Sam Gillen
- Rosanna Arquette as Clydie Anderson
- Kieran Culkin as Mike 'Mookie' Anderson, Clydie's son
- Ted Levine as Mr. Dunston
- Tiffany Taubman as Bree Anderson, Clydie's daughter
- Joss Ackland as Franklin Hale
- Edward Blatchford as Sheriff Lonnie Poole
- Anthony Starke as Billy
- James Greene as Country Store Clerk
- John Finn as Cop in chase
- John Kerry as big thug John
- Tony Epper as fire thug Al

== Production ==
Producer Craig Baumgarten conceived the story a decade before its production from a concept by director Richard Marquand, who later collaborated with Joe Eszterhas on the script. However, following Marquand's unexpected death, the script remained shelved for years. When seeking a project for Jean-Claude Van Damme, Baumgarten recalled the script and deemed it a suitable fit. Van Damme reportedly received $3.5 million for the role.

On June 30, 1992, Daily Variety announced the $15 million film under its initial title "Pals" as part of a three-picture agreement between Columbia Pictures and Van Damme. The tentative location was Santa Barbara, California, with an anticipated start date of April 1, 1992, aiming to precede the expiration of Screen Actors Guild and American Federation of Television and Radio Artists contracts on June 30. The Hollywood Reporter, however, using the alternate title "Crossing the Line," indicated a May 1992 start date. Principal photography began on June 8, 1992, in Napa Valley, California. Filming extended to Occidental, California, for nearly a month, and concluded in Los Angeles, specifically at Sony Pictures Studios in Culver City.

Eszterhas has since said his original script was "taken and destroyed many years later by Jean-Claude Van Damme... It lost its sensitivity, it lost everything. I don't like to remember that movie." Van Damme later said, "The script was... not that good. The writer told me he was going to fix everything. I was in his house, he shook my hand, he promised me, but he didn't fix it."

== Reception ==
=== Box office ===
Nowhere to Run opened January 15, 1993, in 1,745 theaters. In its opening weekend, the film made $8,203,255, at #4 behind Aladdin's tenth weekend, A Few Good Men's sixth, and Alive's first weekend.

The film finally grossed $22,189,039 in the United States and Canada. The film performed better internationally, grossing $41.9 million in other territories for a worldwide gross of $64 million.

=== Critical response ===
The film received mostly negative reviews from critics. On Rotten Tomatoes 35% of 26 critics gave the film a positive review. On Metacritic it has a score of 41% based on 16 reviews. Audiences polled by CinemaScore gave the film an average grade of "B+" on an A+ to F scale. Despite that, the film has a cult following with most fans declaring it as "one of Van Damme's better films".
