= Priscilla Taylor =

American model and actress (born 1976)

Priscilla Lee Taylor

Playboy centerfold appearance
- March 1996
- Preceded by: Kona Carmack
- Succeeded by: Gillian Bonner

Personal details
- Born: Priscilla Lee Taylor; August 15, 1976 (age 48); Miami, Florida
- Height: 5 ft 8 in (1.73 m)

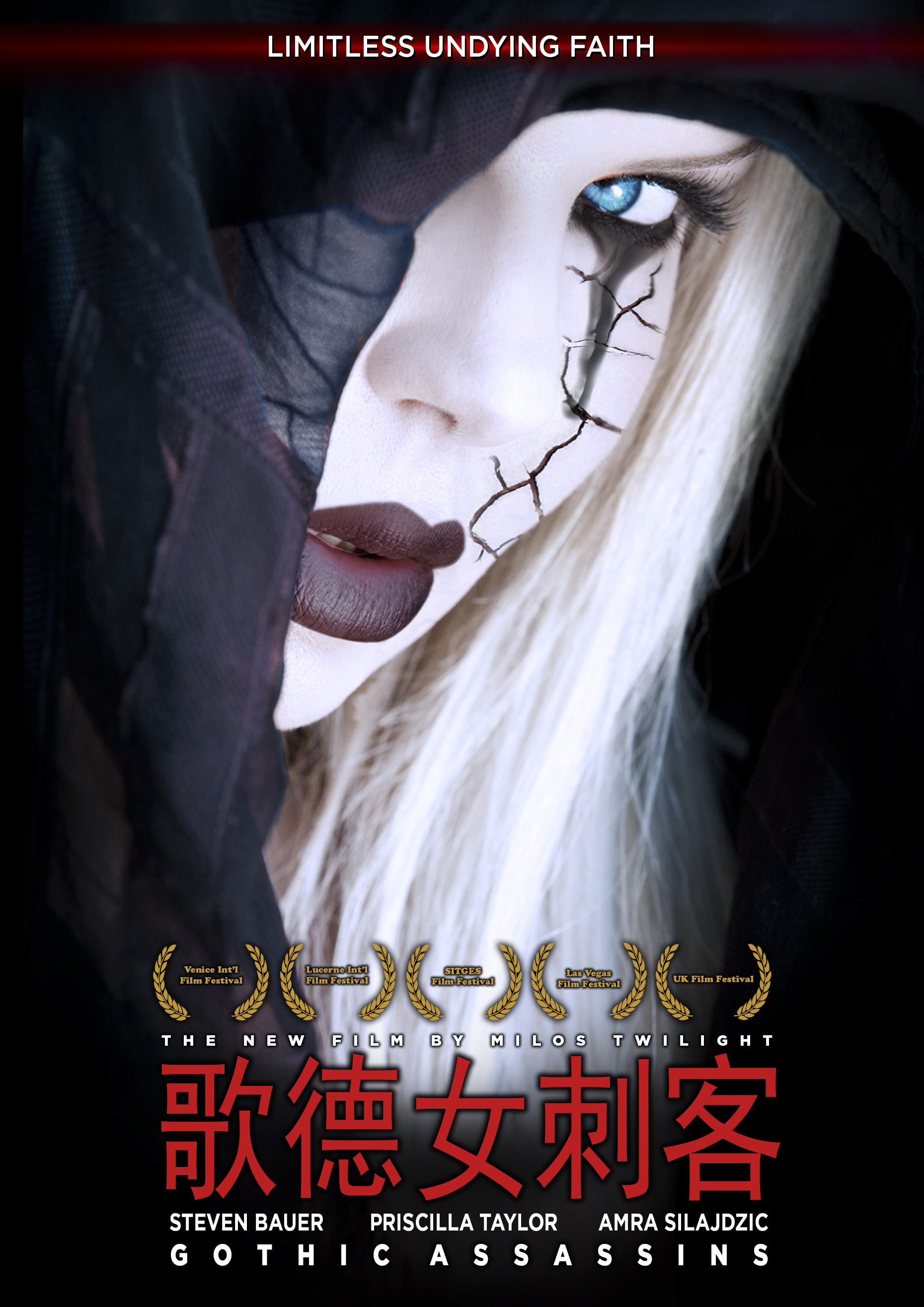
It's a picture depicting the character from the movie

Priscilla Lee Taylor (born August 15, 1976) is an American model and actress. She is Playboy magazine's Playmate of the Month for March 1996. Her centerfold was photographed by Richard Fegley.

Taylor started modelling at age 12. She co-starred on a teen sitcom Malibu, CA as Traycee Banks. Taylor is also the founder and owner of "Dutchess Couture". She was also a competitor in the Playboy Playmate episode of Fear Factor in 2002. In addition to being an actor, Priscilla is also a film producer.

Taylor gained more attention for her role in Gothic Assassins, co-starring alongside Steven Bauer.

== Filmography ==
=== Film ===
Year	Title	Role	Notes
1998	The Chosen One: Legend of the Raven	Betz	
1998	Six Days, Seven Nights	Bathing Suit Girl	
2000	The Independent	Iris	
2003	View from the Top	Janette	
2004	The Wager	Lisa	
2005	Lava Lounge	Laura	
2012	Gothic Assassins	Dalhiax Dax	
2015	The Dalhia Knights	Dalhiax Dax	
2016	Gothic Assassins Redux	Dalhiax Dax	

=== Television ===
Year	Title	Role	Notes
1997	Baywatch Nights	Blonde Actress	Episode: "The Vortex"
1998	Ellen	Melanie	Episode: "Ellen in Focus"
1998–2000	Malibu, CA	Traycee Banks	34 episodes
2002	V.I.P.	Elaine	Episode: "Miss Con-Jeannie-Ality"
2002	Off Centre	Towel Girl	Episode: "The Unkindest Cut"
2005	Out of Practice	Donna	Episode: "Brothers Grim"

Victoria Fuller	Kona Carmack	Priscilla Taylor	Gillian Bonner	Shauna Sand	Karin Taylor
Angel Boris	Jessica Lee	Jennifer Allan	Nadine Chanz	Ulrika Ericsson	Victoria Silvstedt
