= Malibu, CA (TV series) =

American teen sitcom

- The season 1 cast of Malibu, CA. Top row (L–R): Brandon Brooks, Trevor Merszei, and Gina Marie May. Bottom row (L–R): Jason Hayes and Wendi Kenya.
- Created by: Peter Engel; Carl Kurlander
- Starring: Trevor Merszei; Jason Hayes; Edward Blatchford; Brandon Brooks; Priscilla Lee Taylor; Wendi Kenya; Gina Marie May (season 1); Marquita Terry (season 2); Suzanne Davis (season 2)
- Country of origin: United States
- Original language: English
- No. of seasons: 2
- No. of episodes: 52

Production
- Executive producer: Peter Engel
- Running time: 30 minutes
- Production companies: Peter Engel Productions; NBC Enterprises; Tribune Entertainment

Original release
- Release: October 11, 1998 – May 20, 2000

Malibu, CA is an American teen sitcom produced by Peter Engel that aired from October 11, 1998, to May 20, 2000, in syndication. Co-created by Engel and Carl Kurlander, the show centred on the lives of twin brothers Scott (Trevor Merszei) and Jason Collins (Jason Hayes), who move to Malibu, California, from New York City to live with their father, Peter (Edward Blatchford).

Guest appearances on the show included Dennis Haskins (who had previously worked with Engel for several years on Saved by the Bell), Scott Whyte and Marissa Dyan from City Guys, Daniella Deutscher and Dick Butkus from Hang Time, Josh Holland and Kristen Miller from USA High, and model Victoria Silvstedt.

The series was one of two post–Saved by the Bell: The College Years programs executively produced by Peter Engel that did not air on NBC's TNBC lineup, USA High being the other. Prior to the 2012 premiere of The First Family, Malibu, CA was the last situation comedy to be broadcast in the United States for the first-run syndication market.

== Cast ==
- Trevor Merszei as Scott Collins
- Jason Hayes as Jason Collins
- Edward Blatchford as Peter Collins
- Brandon Brooks as Murray Updyke
- Wendi Kenya as Jennifer "Stads" Stadler (main cast Season 1; recurring Season 2)
- Gina Marie May as Samantha "Sam" Chapman (Season 1)
- Priscilla Lee Taylor as Traycee Banks (recurring Season 1; main cast Season 2)
- Marquita Terry as Lisa Jones (Season 2)
- Suzanne Davis as Alexandra "Alex" Kaufman (Season 2)

== Episodes ==
Season	Episodes	Originally released	
Season	Episodes	First released	Last released
1	26	October 11, 1998	May 23, 1999
2	26	October 9, 1999	May 20, 2000

=== Season 1 (1998–1999) ===
No. overall	No. in season	Title	Directed by	Written by	Original release date	Prod. code
1	1	"Welcome to Malibu"	Gary Shimokawa	Carl Kurlander	October 11, 1998	70001
Fraternal twins Scott and Jason Collins move from New York City to Malibu to be with their father Peter, who runs a restaurant there called the Lighthouse. Both boys are immediately attracted to their neighbor Samantha and just as quickly start competing for her attention.
2	2	"Surf Sale"	Gary Shimokawa	Eddie Ring & Mark Lavine	October 18, 1998	70003
Condo developers plan to get rid of The Surf Shack, Murray's favourite place. For a time, it looks like The Surf Shack has a date with the bulldozer, but then Peter steps in to save the day.
3	3	"Miss Malibu"	Gary Shimokawa	Renee Palyo	October 25, 1998	70002
While caring for their father's tropical fish while he is away, Jason and Scott find one of them, Peter's favorite "Goldie," dead. To raise the money to replace the expensive fish, the brothers hold a Miss Malibu contest and fix it so that Samantha will be the winner.
4	4	"The Classic Car"	Gary Shimokawa	Carl Kurlander	November 1, 1998	70004
Scott is restoring a 1965 Ford Mustang and Samantha is spending a lot of time helping him with it, causing concern for Jason and Stads. To stop Scott and Sam from going to a car show in Santa Barbara, Stads and Jason make it look like the Mustang was stolen.
5	5	"Photo Shoot"	Gary Shimokawa	Ross Abrash	November 8, 1998	70006
Fashion photographer Devon chooses Samantha for a photo shoot, but Jason believes he is just hitting on her and tells Scott to intervene.
6	6	"My Hero"	Gary Shimokawa	Bob Underwood	November 15, 1998	70005
Jason and Stads are dating, but Jason is embarrassed by Stads always outdoing him in athletics. A robbery is attempted at the Lighthouse while the couple are there. The lights go out and Stads knocks out the robber. When the confusion settles down, Stads gives Jason credit for subduing the thief.
7	7	"Scott's Old Girlfriend"	Gary Shimokawa	Brett Dewey	November 22, 1998	70007
Megan, Scott's ex-girlfriend from New York, visits Malibu, causing a strain in his relationship with Samantha.
8	8	"Two 'Man' Bowling"	Gary Shimokawa	Eddie Ring & Mark Lavine	November 29, 1998	70010
Jason and Scott enter a bowling tournament against the reigning Malibu Lanes champ Louie.
9	9	"Murray Wear"	Gary Shimokawa	Brett Dewey	December 6, 1998	70012
Scott and Jason are desperate to make some money after botching supply orders at the restaurant. To do this, they put their own home shopping show on the local public-access television channel.
10	10	"The Costume Party"	Gary Shimokawa	Bob Underwood	December 13, 1998	70009
Jason is jealous of Stads' hunky lifeguard partner Kip. Scott advises him to flirt with Traycee to make Stads jealous, and Samantha advises Stads to do likewise with Kip. Jason and Stads argue while shopping for costumes for a party, and the two break up.
11	11	"Malibu Holiday"	Gary Shimokawa	Ross Abrash	December 20, 1998	70008
Scott recognizes actress Jessie Sinclair at The Lighthouse, but he agrees to keep the news quiet.
12	12	"The Big Storm"	Gary Shimokawa	Renee Palyo	January 10, 1999	70014
Jason and Stads have a big fight over his gift to her, tickets to a concert that he is anxious to go to. Samantha advises Jason to buy another gift for Stads and the two of them set out for Beverly Hills to buy a necklace. On the way a big storm rolls in, causing a mudslide.
13	13	"Mom Returns"	Gary Shimokawa	Brett Dewey	January 17, 1999	70011
Jason and Scott worry that they will have to move back to New York when their mother visits.
14	14	"Murray for Mayor"	Gary Shimokawa	Story by : Eddie Ring & Mark Lavine; Teleplay by : Carl Kurlander & Bob Underwood	January 24, 1999	70013
Murray decides to run for mayor of Malibu to save a 500-year-old tree stump slated for removal in order to build a road to a hospital. His opponent, Dennis Haskins (the actor who played Mr. Belding on Saved by the Bell), is determined to catch Jason and Scott, who have been illegally using campaign funds.
15	15	"Love on the 'Net"	Gary Shimokawa	Bob Underwood & Ross Abrash	January 31, 1999	70015
After his breakup with Stads, Jason is striking out with women while Scott is having great success with girls he is meeting on the Internet. Later Jason finds his brother's latest internet girl; Jocelyn (Daniella Deutscher) and pretends to be Scott in order to date her, as well as fooling his brother by changing her picture. Meanwhile Traycee is training with Stads to become a lifeguard in order to appear on Baywatch.
16	16	"Mrs. Murray"	Gary Shimokawa	Story by : Renee Palyo & Ross Abrash; Teleplay by : Rob Hammersley	February 7, 1999	70017
Murray is attracted to a sunbather on the beach named Amber. To help him out, Jason lets her know that Murray is a trust-fund baby, and Amber all of a sudden is wild about Murray.
17	17	"The Game Show"	Gary Shimokawa	Renee Palyo & Ross Abrash	February 14, 1999	70018
Peter promotes Scott to a position over Jason at the restaurant. In their sibling rivalry, the boys make a $200 bet over who is the better ladies' man. To do this they appear on Traycee's new cable show which is similar to The Dating Game.
18	18	"The Dude of Love"	Gary Shimokawa	Renee Palyo & Ross Abrash	February 21, 1999	70019
Jason likes a girl he meets on the beach named Holly (Kristen Miller), but she has a boyfriend.
19	19	"Jason's New Job"	Gary Shimokawa	Story by : Tony Soltis; Teleplay by : Renee Palyo & Carl Kurlander	February 28, 1999	70021
Jason is hurt and offended when his father snaps at him at work, and takes a new job at a health club. However, when Peter's new hire robs his restaurant, a familiar face comes to the rescue.
20	20	"The Older Woman"	Gary Shimokawa	Carl Kurlander & Ross Abrash	April 11, 1999	70024
Laura, a graphic designer, is hired to design new menus for The Lighthouse, and the boys notice that their father has more than a professional interest in her.
21	21	"Scott's Secret Dream"	Gary Shimokawa	Story by : Scott Yaffe; Teleplay by : Tony Soltis	April 18, 1999	70023
Stads is interning at a local TV station and everyone else seems to want to get in on the act. Traycee tries out for weather girl, Jason enters the jingle-writing contest, and Scott wants to be a sports commentator.
22	22	"Mom's Gift"	Gary Shimokawa	Renee Palyo	April 25, 1999	70026
The boys have forgotten to buy their mother a birthday present, so they decide to make her a videotape all about their lives in Malibu.
23	23	"The New Cook"	Gary Shimokawa	Eddie Ring & Mark Lavine	May 2, 1999	70016
Peter gives Jason and Scott the responsibility of hiring a new cook while he is away, and they choose a beautiful, statuesque blonde (Victoria Silvstedt) – whose cooking is awful.
24	24	"Uncle Charlie"	Gary Shimokawa	Tony Soltis	May 9, 1999	70020
The boys' favourite uncle, Charlie (Dick Butkus), is coming to visit, but he is not as happy about it as they are.
25	25	"The Yacht"	Gary Shimokawa	Story by : Ross Abrash; Teleplay by : Renee Palyo & Carl Kurlander	May 16, 1999	70022
Scott and Jason accidentally destroy their father's $2000 watch. To raise money to replace it, they convince Murray to hold a "Casino Night" on his father's yacht while he is out of town.
26	26	"The Triathlon"	Gary Shimokawa	Ross Abrash & Carl Kurlander	May 23, 1999	70025
Jason gets jealous when Stads and Scott spend time together for an upcoming triathlon. Meanwhile, after an accident in The Lighthouse, Traycee decides to sue Peter, but then later marries him. Note: This is Gina Marie May's last appearance on the show as Samantha Chapman.

=== Season 2 (1999–2000) ===
No. overall	No. in season	Title	Directed by	Written by	Original release date	Prod. code
27	1	"Race Your Dream"	Gary Shimokawa	Carl Kurlander	October 9, 1999	70051
Medical student Lisa Jones insults Jason and Scott. Note: Priscilla Taylor (Traycee Banks) is added to the main cast and appears in the show's opening credits. It is also the first appearance of Marquita Terry as Lisa Jones.
28	2	"Jason's Song"	Gary Shimokawa	Tony Soltis	October 16, 1999	70052
Jesse, a member of Peter's 1970s band the Disco Dudes, shows up at the Lighthouse.
29	3	"Aloha"	Gary Shimokawa	Mark Gordon	October 23, 1999	70053
The Lighthouse is losing business to another restaurant, the Aloha. Meanwhile, Traycee decides to have a new look to get a proper date.
30	4	"Chasing Stads"	Gary Shimokawa	Brett Dewey	October 30, 1999	70054
Stads experiences too much bad luck so she decides to leave Malibu. Note: This is Wendi Kenya's last appearance on the show as Stads, though her character is mentioned in one subsequent episode.
31	5	"Off the Deep End"	Gary Shimokawa	Renee Palyo	November 6, 1999	70055
Peter has been ignoring Scott's swim meets and now only three are left before the Olympic trials. Fearing that he's doing the same thing to Scott now that he did to him when he was younger, Mr. Collins now tries to get as involved as possible. Note: This is Suzanne Davis' first appearance on the show as Alex Kaufman.
32	6	"Dancing Fools"	Gary Shimokawa	Brett Dewey	November 13, 1999	70056
Lisa receives a gift (a human skeleton!) from a secret admirer. Scott finds out that Murray is the one who sent it to her. Lisa needs an additional $1800 for tuition. Jason tells her about the swing dance contest at the Malibu Country Club with a prize of $2000. When she finds out Murray and family are all members, she gets him to be her partner for the contest.
33	7	"The Long Goodbye"	Gary Shimokawa	Carl Kurlander	November 20, 1999	70057
After a successful audition before Alex's uncle the producer, Jason gets the go-ahead to make a demo recording. He's surprised to see that the producer sent to work with him is a woman: a young, attractive one.
34	8	"Guess Who's Coming to Malibu"	Gary Shimokawa	Mark Gordon	November 27, 1999	70058
Peter is thrilled to be named businessman of the year by the Malibu Business Association. Murray is excited that his favorite actor Josh Denmark (Josh Holland) is in Malibu shooting a film.
35	9	"Starstruck"	Gary Shimokawa	Tony Soltis	December 4, 1999	70059
Jason has been having a great time with Alex and he admits to Murray that he'd like to date her. However, his film star friend Josh Denmark tells him that he too would like to date Alex.
36	10	"The Comeback"	Gary Shimokawa	Leslie Eberhard	December 11, 1999	70060
Scott is excited about working with a new therapist, Ted from California University, and he believes against all odds that he will be in shape for the Olympic swim team trials. Trying to rush along his rehabilitation, he persuades Ted to let him get back in the water. Scott says he feels great and his comeback is progressing very rapidly, but he's been taking medication to ease the pain his shoulder is causing him
37	11	"The Best Man"	Gary Shimokawa	Brett Dewey & Tony Solits	January 15, 2000	70061
While trying to avoid hurting Murray's feelings, Scott and Lisa kiss.
38	12	"Jason's Deal"	Gary Shimokawa	Noah Taft	January 22, 2000	70062
Jason is on cloud nine when the news comes that his CD will be released and he's even happier when Steve Lansing from the record company gives him a $20,000 advance. He starts spending the money lavishly, which concerns his father Peter and brother Scott, especially when he leaves them out of certain events.
39	13	"Lisa's Ex"	Gary Shimokawa	Troy Searer & Tony Solits	January 29, 2000	70063
Lisa is caught in a triangle between current boyfriend Scott and her basketball player ex-boyfriend.
40	14	"Retiring Dad"	Gary Shimokawa	Tony Soltis & Troy Searer	February 5, 2000	70065
The boys run the restaurant when Peter decides to retire.
41	15	"Goin' Up in Smoke"	Gary Shimokawa	Renee Palyo & Ross Abrash	February 12, 2000	70064
Scott, Peter and visiting Uncle Charlie learn that Jason is smoking again.
42	16	"Movin' on Out"	Gary Shimokawa	Brett Dewey	February 19, 2000	70066
Traycee is driving Lisa crazy as a room-mate. Traycee's late-night parties make it hard for her to study, she doesn't remember to give Lisa her phone messages, and she interrupts Scott and Lisa when they are alone. Frustrated, Lisa types up a list of house rules for Traycee to follow, which leads to a big blow-up between the room-mates and Traycee says she'll move out. After another far worse room-mate takes Traycee's place, Lisa realises that Traycee isn't such a bad room-mate after all.
43	17	"The New York Girl"	Gary Shimokawa	Troy Searer	February 26, 2000	70067
Peter wants his son Jason to take out his friend's daughter Maggie Taylor (Marissa Dyan) while she's in town from New York. Jason is reluctant, since he remembers her as a geek. Scott remembers how Jason stood her up for the freshman prom back when they lived in New York. Jason bribes Murray into going out with Maggie in his place, but he changes his mind when she shows up and looks quite attractive.
44	18	"Educating Lisa"	Gary Shimokawa	Renee Palyo & Ross Abrash	March 4, 2000	70068
Scott and Lisa are in the same creative writing class together and she is flabbergasted when their instructor Ms. Grant gives Scott an A on an assignment she received a C on. As time goes on, Lisa suspects that Ms. Grant is attracted to Scott, which he considers ridiculous until he discovers the real reason why Ms. Grant keeps giving him good grades.
45	19	"Wonderful Life"	Gary Shimokawa	Brett Dewey & Troy Searer	April 1, 2000	70069
Lisa is fed up after an argument with her friends and goes outside. Her guardian angel, in the form of Traycee who is trying to get new wings, tries to persuade her that her life isn't as miserable as she thinks.
46	20	"The Interview"	Gary Shimokawa	Leslie Eberhard	April 8, 2000	70070
Lisa is extremely nervous about her interview with a professional doctor which makes her snappy and irritating, so Scott and Traycee play a joke on her to show her how silly she is, but it all backfires.
47	21	"Parent Trap"	Gary Shimokawa	Jeffrey Sachs	April 15, 2000	70071
Peter is not happy when a surprise birthday party reminds him of his age. Murray gives him some bungee-jumping tickets and he decides to do it, hoping to feel younger, but the next day at the Lighthouse he regrets it. Traycee tells Scott and Jason that their dad may be having a mid-life crisis and suggests he meet her mother Candee, a former supermodel who's in town, who maybe can provide some companionship.
48	22	"Dr. Freeze"	Gary Shimokawa	Carl Kurlander	April 22, 2000	70072
Lisa is worried about her medical abilities when she faints while helping an injured Scott.
49	23	"The House Guest"	Gary Shimokawa	Carl Kurlander & Renee Palyo	April 29, 2000	70073
Jason and Scott offer to house-sit for Murray while he's away at a surfer's convention. Meanwhile, Traycee makes the mistake of letting Alex be her new personal assistant.
50	24	"Scott a Go-Go"	Gary Shimokawa	Tony Soltis	May 6, 2000	70076
Scott gets a job as a male dancer, while Jason and Peter use Traycee's dreams to gamble.
51	25	"Big Daddy"	Gary Shimokawa	Jay Demopoulous	May 13, 2000	70075
Jason becomes a big brother to a boy. Scott, Peter and Murray think Alex's new boyfriend (Scott Whyte) is a car thief.
52	26	"Three Dudes and a Baby"	Gary Shimokawa	Carl Kurlander & Renee Palyo	May 20, 2000	70074
Jason, Peter and Murray look after the baby daughter of their friend Stacy (Kristen Miller). Lisa's sister comes to visit and Traycee's TV show gets cancelled.

== Stations ==
The series was cleared 88% of the country, and was scheduled to air in 150 markets.

City	Station
Amarillo	KCPN 33
Atlanta	WATL 36
Baltimore	WBFF 45
Boston	WLVI 56
Charlotte	WMYT 55
Chicago	WGN 9
Cleveland	WBNX 55
Columbus	WXTX 54
Dallas	KDAF 33
Denver	KWGN 2
Greeneville	WEMT 39
Houston	KHTV 39
Los Angeles	KTLA 5
Miami	WBZL 39
New York	WPIX 11
Philadelphia	WPHL 17
Phoenix	KSAZ 10
Seattle	KTWB 22
Toledo	WMNT 48
Valdosta	WGVP 44
Washington, DC	WBDC 50
