= Peter Engel =

American television producer (1936–2025)

- Born: June 30, 1936; New York City, U.S.
- Died: March 4, 2025 (aged 88); Santa Monica, California, U.S.
- Occupations: Producer; director; writer
- Years active: 1971–2025

Peter Engel (June 30, 1936 – March 4, 2025) was an American television producer who is best known for his teen sitcoms that appeared on TNBC, a former Saturday morning block on NBC which featured all teenage-oriented programs for educational purposes. His most well known work was the teen sitcom Saved by the Bell which inspired the birth of the TNBC block for his other shows such as California Dreams, Hang Time, and City Guys in the 1990s.

== Life and career ==
Engel was born in New York City on June 30, 1936, and raised Jewish before converting to Christianity. He got a degree from New York University, and had his first industry job as a page at 30 Rockefeller Plaza. In 1971, he has his first executive producer credit for the summer variety series on CBS, The Ice Palace. He was also an executive producer on the 1974-75 daytime soap opera How to Survive a Marriage.

After producing teen-focused series for NBC, Engel transitioned to producing reality television series. A reality television project that Engel executive produced is the NBC reality series Last Comic Standing. He released a memoir in 2016 titled I Was Saved by the Bell: Stories of Life, Love, and Dreams That Do Come True.

Engel died in Santa Monica, California, on March 4, 2025, at the age of 88.

== Production filmography ==
- Good Morning, Miss Bliss (1988–1989)
- Saved by the Bell (1989–1993)
- California Dreams (1992–1996)
- Saved by the Bell: The College Years (1993–1994)
- Saved by the Bell: The New Class (1993–2000)
- Hang Time (1995–2000)
- USA High (1997–1999)
- City Guys (1997–2001)
- One World (1998–2001)
- Malibu, CA (1998–2000)
- All About Us (2001)
- Last Comic Standing (2003)

=== Associated production companies ===
- NBC Productions (1988–1996)
- NBC Studios (1996–2001)
- NBC Enterprises (1996–2001)
