= Josie Totah =

American actress (born 2001)

- Born: 2001 (age 24–25)
- Other name: J. J. Totah
- Education: Chapman University (BFA)
- Occupation: Actress
- Years active: 2012–present

Josie Totah (born 2001), formerly known as J. J. Totah, is an American actress. She is known for her recurring role on the Disney Channel series Jessie and a supporting role on the 2013 ABC comedy series Back in the Game. She received praise from critics for her role in the 2016 film Other People. In 2018, she starred in the NBC comedy series Champions. Totah starred as Lexi in the 2020 revival of Saved by the Bell, which ran for two seasons.

Totah began her career playing male roles. She publicly came out as transgender in August 2018, changing her first name to Josie.

== Early life ==
Totah is the third child of Suheil and Christine Totah. She has a sister and brother; she is of Palestinian and Lebanese ancestry.

== Career ==
Totah began her acting career in 2012 when she was cast as the "Lil' Dictator" in the first production for AwesomenessTV. Beginning in 2013 she portrayed Stuart Wooten, a boy with a crush on series regular Skai Jackson (Zuri Ross), on the Disney Channel Original Series Jessie. Totah has guest starred on the TV shows New Girl, 2 Broke Girls, and Liv and Maddie.

Also in 2013, Totah was cast in a supporting role in the ABC comedy Back in the Game. In the same year, she and her mother appeared in an episode of Family Game Night. In 2015, she was cast in the sixth season of Glee as the youngest member ever of the New Directions, appearing in four episodes. In 2016, Totah appeared in the film Other People, and received critical praise for her role from Variety, which named her as one of its Sundance Breakout Stars of the year. In October 2016, Deadline Hollywood reported that Totah would star in a new comedy for NBC, which Totah also helped develop and was set to produce, alongside executive producers Adam and Naomi Scott. In 2017, she appeared in the Netflix detective comedy Handsome: A Netflix Mystery Movie and the Marvel Studios film Spider-Man: Homecoming.

In January 2017, Totah joined Adam Devine in the Disney feature film Magic Camp. In February 2017, she was cast as Michael Patel, the son of Mindy Kaling's character, Priya Patel, in the NBC comedy Champions, which was picked up to series in May 2017, and aired from March 8 to May 25, 2018, before being canceled. Totah was cast in a Saved by the Bell reboot for NBC's streaming service Peacock, on which she played the character of Lexi, a socially powerful cheerleader. Totah was nominated for a Critic's Choice Award for Best Supporting Actress in a Comedy Series for this role.

In August 2022, she started a podcast titled Dare We Say with Yasmine Hamady and Saved by the Bell co-star Alycia Pascual-Peña.

In 2023, Totah was cast in lead role in the Apple TV series The Buccaneers based on the unfinished novel by Edith Wharton. Totah plays the role of Mabel Elmsworth in the series.

Totah appears as Tina Blake in Prime Video's Carrie, a 2026 adaptation by Mike Flanagan of the Stephen King novel of the same name.

== Personal life ==
Totah attended a Catholic school growing up. She considers herself "semi-religious".

On August 20, 2018, she wrote an article published in Time magazine in which she came out as a transgender female.

Totah attended Chapman University, graduating in 2022. She was a member of a sorority.

== Filmography ==
=== Film ===
Year	Title	Role
2016	Time Toys	Boomer
2016	Other People	Justin
2017	Handsome	Charles
2017	Spider-Man: Homecoming	Seymour O'Reilly
2020	Magic Camp	Judd
2021	Moxie	CJ
2026	Faces of Death	Samantha Gravinsky

=== Television ===
Year	Title	Role	Notes
2012	Kroll Show	Birthday Party Kid	Unknown episodes
2013–2015	Jessie	Stuart Wooten	Recurring role, 7 episodes
2013–2014	Back in the Game	Michael Lovette	Supporting role
2013	Family Game Night	Self	Contestant
2014	Nina Needs to Go!	Frank	Main voice role, television shorts
2014	The Exes	Cooper	Episode: "My Fair Stuart"
2014	Sofia the First	Prince Jin	Voice role, 3 episodes
2014	New Girl	Todd	Episode: "Dance"
2014	2 Broke Girls	Elliot	Episode: "And the Childhood Not Included"
2015	Glee	Myron Muskovitz	4 episodes
2016	Tween Fest	Stop the Preston	4 episodes
2016–2017	Liv and Maddie: Cali Style	Skeeter Parham	3 episodes
2018	Champions	Michael Patel	Main role
2019	The Other Two	Elijah	Episode: "Chase Goes to a High School Dance"
2019	No Good Nick	Lisa Haddad	4 episodes
2020	Big Mouth	Natalie (voice)	3 episodes
2020–2021	Saved by the Bell	Lexi Haddad-DeFabrizio	Main role; producer
2021	iCarly	Willow	Episode: "iFauxpologize"
2022	Human Resources	Natalie (voice)	2 episodes
2022	Mr Mayor	Titi B	3 episodes
2023–present	The Buccaneers	Mabel Elmsworth	Main role
2026	Carrie	Christina "Tina" Blake	Main role

=== Music videos ===
Year	Title	Artist	Role
2024	"Days of Girlhood"	Dylan Mulvaney	Pool Extra
