= Dylan Meyer (screenwriter) =

American screenwriter

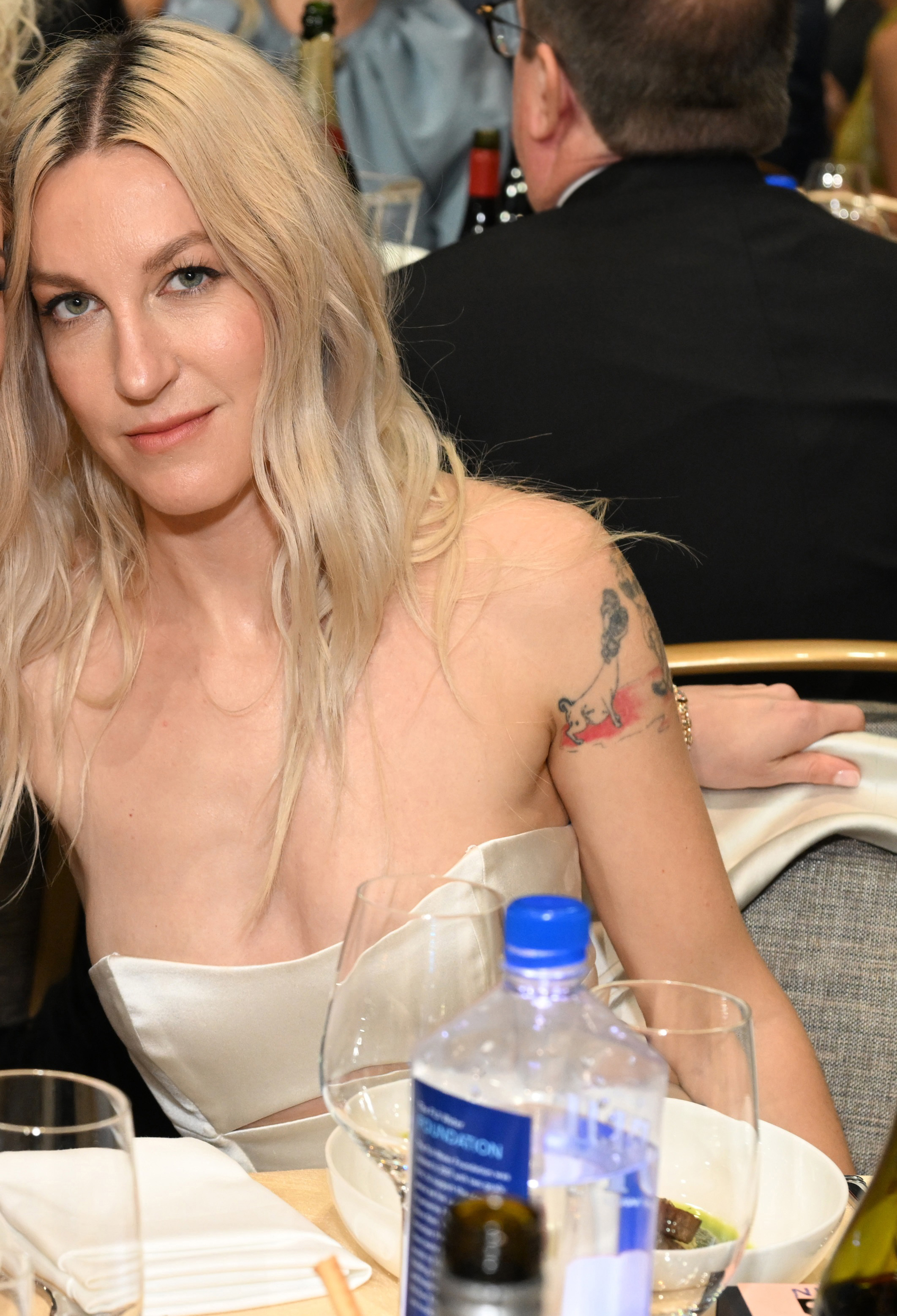
- Meyer in 2022
- Born: Los Angeles, California, U.S.
- Occupations: Writer, producer, screenwriter and film producer
- Years active: 2011–present
- Notable work: XOXO; Moxie
- Spouse: Kristen Stewart (m. 2025)
- Father: Nicholas Meyer

Dylan Meyer is an American screenwriter and film producer. Her screenwriting credits include XOXO (2016), Moxie (2021), and her directorial debut, The Wrong Girls (2026).

== Early life ==
Born Rachel Meyer, she changed her name to Dylan while at college. She is the daughter of Oscar-nominated screenwriter and director Nicholas Meyer, and Lauren Meyer, and grew up in London and Los Angeles. Her father's family is Jewish. Her mother died of breast cancer when Dylan was around 5 years of age, after which Dylan, her father and younger sister returned to Los Angeles.

== Career ==
As an actress, Meyer appeared in the short films Death and Return of Superman (2011), Wrestling Isn't Wrestling (2015), and Jem Reacts to the New Jem and the Holograms Trailer (2015). She wrote episodes of the sci-fi series Miss 2059. Meyer also wrote the short film Loose Ends.

She co-wrote and executive produced the 2016 Netflix movie XOXO, starring Sarah Hyland. In 2019, she wrote, directed and co-produced her own short film Rock Bottom, which went on to win the Best Short award at the 2019 Chattanooga Film Festival.

She and Tamara Chestna adapted the Jennifer Mathieu novel into the script for the film Moxie starring Amy Poehler for Netflix (2021).

Alongside producer Maggie McLean and actress Kristen Stewart, she founded the production company Nevermind Pictures, which signed a first-look deal with Fremantle in 2024. Through Nevermind, Meyer is a producer on the biopic of Lidia Yuknavitch, The Chronology of Water.

In February 2025, principal photography began on Meyer's directorial feature length debut, The Wrong Girls, from a script Meyer co-wrote and a cast containing Kristen Stewart, Seth Rogen, and LaKeith Stanfield, amongst others. Meyer is also a producer on the film. The film was described as Meyer's "passion project" by Rolling Stone magazine. Discussing the film in 2023, Stewart described it as a "stoner girl comedy".

== Personal life ==
Meyer and actress Kristen Stewart first met on the set of American Ultra in 2013, and were first romantically linked in the media in the summer of 2019. In October of that year, the relationship was confirmed on their social media. On November 2, 2021, Stewart told Howard Stern on his radio show that the pair had become engaged. On April 20, 2025, it was reported that Meyer and Stewart had married.

== Filmography ==
Year	Title	Work			Note	Ref(s)
Year	Title	Director	Writer	Producer	Note	Ref(s)
2015	Loose Ends	No	Yes	No	Short film	
2016	XOXO	No	Yes	Excutive		
2017-2018	Miss 2059	No	Yes	No		
2019	Rock Bottom	Yes	Yes	Yes	Short film	
2021	Moxie	No	Yes	No		
2025	The Chronology of Water	No	No	Yes		
2026	Barbara Forever	No	No	Excutive		
2026	The Wrong Girls	Yes	Yes	No		
