= Haskiri Velazquez =

American actress

- Born: September 10, 1995 (age 30); New York City, New York, United States
- Occupation: Actress
- Years active: 2011–present

Haskiri Velazquez is an American actress. She is best known for playing the lead role of Daisy Jimenez in the 2020 reboot series Saved by the Bell and Charlotte on the Netflix horror series The Birch.

== Early life ==
Velazquez was born in New York City to parents of Puerto Rican and Dominican descent. She has two brothers who she shared a bedroom with. She grew living with both parents and had to get the subway to get to auditions.

== Career ==
Velazquez made her on-screen debut in an episode of the comedic web series East Willy B. She then made a one off appearance in the police procedural series NYC 22 where she played Tatiana Garcia. Her first big film role was when she played the butch latina Rosa in the comedy drama film The Forty-Year-Old Version. She gained nationwide fame for playing Charlotte, one of the lead characters of the Netflix horror series The Birch Her biggest role so far has been playing the lead role of Dais in the 2020 reboot series Saved by the Bell. She played Nina Romero in the musical film Intermedium starring Michael Rady and Amy Hargreaves.

== Filmography ==
=== Film ===
Year	Title	Role	Notes
2015	Aleah	Yanni	Short
2015	The Trade	Olga	Short
2019	The Last	Michelle	Short
2020	The Forty-Year-Old Version	Rosa	Short
2020	Lost Girls	Sprint Trainee	
2020	What Lies Below	Marley	
2021	The Girl in the Window	Ava	
2022	Merit X Zoe	Zoe	Short
2023	Intermedium	Nina Romero	
2022	Development	Estefani	Short
2023	Marvin Is Sorry	Randi	Short

=== Television ===
Year	Title	Role	Notes
2011	East Willy B	Teen Ballplayer	Episode; Prodigal Son Returns
2012	NYC 22	Tatiana Garcia	Episode; Thugs and Lovers
2016	Law & Order: Special Victims Unit	Shyvon Stevens	Episode; Making a Rapist
2019	The Birch	Charlotte	7 episodes
2020	Blue Bloods	Melissa Rodriguez	Episode; Reckless
2020-2021	Saved by the Bell	Daisy Jimenez	20 episodes
