= Jay Kelly (soundtrack) =

Jay Kelly (Original Motion Picture Soundtrack)

Film score by Nicholas Britell
- Released: November 28, 2025
- Recorded: 2025
- Venue: London
- Studio: Abbey Road Studios; AIR Studios; British Grove Studios; Conosum Studios
- Genre: Film score
- Length: 55:01
- Label: Netflix Music
- Producer: Nicholas Britell

Nicholas Britell chronology
Mountainhead (2025)	Jay Kelly (2025)

Singles from Jay Kelly (Original Motion Picture Soundtrack)
- 1. "Jay Kelly Theme – Quintet" Released: August 28, 2025

Jay Kelly (Original Motion Picture Soundtrack) is the soundtrack album to the 2025 film Jay Kelly directed by Noah Baumbach, starring George Clooney, Adam Sandler, Laura Dern and Billy Crudup. The film score is composed by Nicholas Britell and was recorded at three studios in London. The quintet version of the main theme was preceded as the single on August 28, 2025, and the soundtrack was released through Netflix Music on November 28, 2025. The score was positively reviewed by critics.

== Background ==
In July 2025, it was announced that Nicholas Britell would compose the musical score for Jay Kelly, in his maiden collaboration with Baumbach. Britell recalled that when Baumbach shared his vision for the score in particular, he wanted the score to have an own voice for the film, and partner with the film itself.

As per Baumbach's suggestion, Britell had written the musical score which was reminiscent of the classical Hollywood cinema. To achieve that, Britell recorded the film's soundtrack in an analog tape instead of digital recording. Further, he wrote the main character's theme backwards, providing a subconscious style to the viewer and efficiently shaping the emotional landscape.

The score was performed in reverse during scenes where the titular character engages with his past and further used to punctuate the film's emotional climax, where Kelly watches a montage of his past work. Much of the score was written even before the film began production, so that Baumbach played it on sets for the actors to rehearse. Clooney and the rest of the cast told that it influenced their performances.

== Release ==
The quintet version of the main theme was released on August 28, 2025, coinciding with the film's premiere at the Venice Film Festival. The film's soundtrack was released through Netflix Music on November 28, 2025, a week before the film's Netflix premiere.

== Reception ==
Brian Tallerico of RogerEbert.com wrote "Nicholas Brittell's lovely score add to the film's often sterile tone when it should be a movie that's rougher around the edges." David Rooney of The Hollywood Reporter called it a "tender" score. Marshall Shaffer of Slant Magazine wrote "the soft piano keys of Nicholas Britell's overbearing score re-enter to assure us that we should be feeling warm and fuzzy inside."

Michael Andor Brodeur of The Washington Post wrote "The brisk quintet theme that follows Jay around, composed by Nicholas Britell, feels likewise tethered to a bygone era." Joseph A. Wulfsohn of Fox News wrote "composer Nicholas Britell delivers a lush score fitting for Jay's lavish lifestyle." Steve Pond of TheWrap noted that Britell balances lightheartedness and melodrama with a pinch of comedy, something that Baumbach's previous collaborator Randy Newman did for The Meyerowitz Stories (2017) and Marriage Story (2019).

== Track listing ==
No.	Title	Length
1.	"Opening Quote – Jay Kelly"	0:45
2.	"Practicing the Score – Cast and Crew Prepping"	2:22
3.	"Picture Wrap and Jay Kelly Theme"	1:28
4.	"He Has a Black Eye? – Ron's Theme"	1:03
5.	"To Paris – Fanfare"	1:05
6.	"Timothy Memory – Shadow Theme"	0:54
7.	"Jay Kelly Theme – Piano and Strings"	1:34
8.	"In Paris / We're Taking a Train"	1:40
9.	"Joie de Vivre – Felt Piano"	0:57
10.	"The Carnival of Life"	1:51
11.	"Jessica Memory"	1:19
12.	"Searching for Daisy"	1:26
13.	"Daisy"	0:40
14.	"I'm Sorry About the Eiffel Tower"	1:50
15.	"Daphne Memory"	1:15
16.	"Do You Remember This Like I Do? – Cinema Theme"	2:18
17.	"Jay and Ron"	0:51
18.	"The Chase"	0:53
19.	"Night Train – Reflection in D Minor"	1:52
20.	"Here in Italy / Driving with Alba"	2:54
21.	"Crying in Italy / Ron's Theme for Felt Piano"	1:29
22.	"Real Life Hero"	0:45
23.	"Chasing Dad"	1:46
24.	"The Forest"	1:39
25.	"Dressing for the Tribute – Cheesecake and Felt Piano"	2:31
26.	"The Tribute"	2:11
27.	"Can I Go Again? – Finale"	3:17
28.	"Jay Kelly Suite"	5:03
29.	"Jay Kelly Theme – Quintet" (Single Version)	2:13
30.	"Joie de Vivre – String Orchestra" (Bonus Track)	0:59
31.	"Fanfare – Quintet" (Bonus Track)	0:59
32.	"Cinema Theme – Quintet" (Bonus Track)	0:56
33.	"Jay Kelly Theme – String Orchestra" (Bonus Track)	2:17

== Personnel ==
Credits adapted from liner notes:

- Music composer, producer, conductor and piano solos: Nicholas Britell
- Music supervisor: George Drakoulias
- Music editor: Todd Kasow
- Violin and Viola soloist: Rob Moose
- Cello soloist: Caitlin Sullivan
- Orchestra: London Contemporary Orchestra
- Orchestrator: Matt Dunkley, Nicholas Britell
- Concertmaster: Everton Nelson
- Orchestra contractor: Jenny Goshawk for Isobel Griffiths
- Studios: Abbey Road Studios, AIR Studios, British Grove Studios, Conosum Studios
- Recording: Tommy Vicari
- Recordist: John Prestage
- Mixing: Geoff Foster
- Mixing assistance: Nichole Neary, Luie Stylianou
- Music preparation: Dave Hage for Dakota Music
- Technical assistance: David Giuli
- Music clearances: Christine Bergren & Julie Butchiko
- Studio managers: Fiona Gillott, Joanne Changer (Abbey Road Studios); Charlotte Matthews, Katy Jackson (AIR Studios); Andrew Cook, Jason Elliot (British Grove Studios); Christopher Ruskis (Lake George Entertainment LLC)
- Studio assistants: Tom Ashpitel (Abbey Road Studios); Rebecca Holdern, Adam Magson (AIR Studios); Felipe Gutierrez (British Grove Studios)

== Accolades ==
Clayton Davis of Variety predicted Nicholas Britell to be the contender for Academy Award for Best Original Score for the 98th Academy Awards.

Award	Date of ceremony	Category	Recipient(s)	Result	Ref.
Astra Creative Arts Awards	December 11, 2025	Best Original Score	Nicholas Britell	Pending	
Hollywood Music in Media Awards	November 19, 2025	Best Original Score in a Feature Film	Nicholas Britell	Nominated	
Virginia Film Festival	October 24, 2025	Achievement in Film Composition	Nicholas Britell	Won	
