= The Truth About Alice =

2014 young adult novel by Jennifer Mathieu

- Author: Jennifer Mathieu
- Publication date: June 3, 2014
- ISBN: 978-1-59643-909-2

The Truth About Alice is a 2014 young adult novel by Jennifer Mathieu. It was published June 3, 2014 by Roaring Brook Press. The book follows Alice Franklin, who becomes the center of high school gossip after football player Brandon starts a rumor that she has sex with him and another boy at a party. Shortly after, he dies in a car crash, which his best friend Josh says is her fault because she was texting him. The story is told via five narrators: Elaine ("the queen bee of the junior class"), Kelsie Sanders (Alice's best friend), Josh Waverly, Kurt Morelli ("nerd extraordinaire"), and Alice.

== Reception ==
Publishers Weekly said, "Mathieu's well-crafted debut portrays all the teens sympathetically, revealing the insecurities that motivate their actions."

In a mostly negative review, Kirkus Reviews called The Truth About Alice a "quick if unoriginal read saved by a realistic ending". They explained the book's lack of originality, saying, "Due to the novel’s short length, the rotating narrators and a few questionable word choices, some characters border on caricatures in places." They also wondered why Mathieu decided to save Alice's perspective, "arguably the most interesting voice in the book", until the final chapter.

In 2014, The Truth About Alice was nominated for the Goodreads Choice Award for Debut Goodreads Author. The following year, it won the CBC Children's Choice Book Award for Debut Author.

Amazon's editors included The Truth About Alice in the list of the top 20 teen and young adult books of 2014.

== Controversy ==
In 2022, The Truth About Alice was listed among 52 books banned by Utah's Alpine School District. It has been removed from public school libraries in Martin County, Florida.
