= Moxie (film) =

2021 film by Amy Poehler

- Official release poster
- Directed by: Amy Poehler
- Screenplay by: Tamara Chestna; Dylan Meyer
- Based on: Moxie by Jennifer Mathieu
- Produced by: Kim Lessing; Morgan Sackett; Amy Poehler
- Starring: Hadley Robinson; Alycia Pascual-Peña; Lauren Tsai; Nico Hiraga; Patrick Schwarzenegger; Amy Poehler
- Cinematography: Tom Magill
- Edited by: Julie Monroe
- Music by: Mac McCaughan
- Production company: Paper Kite Productions
- Distributed by: Netflix
- Release date: March 3, 2021
- Running time: 111 minutes
- Country: United States
- Language: English

Moxie (stylized as MOXiE!) is a 2021 American comedy-drama film directed by Amy Poehler. Tamara Chestna and Dylan Meyer adapted the screenplay from the 2017 novel of the same name by Jennifer Mathieu. It stars Hadley Robinson, Alycia Pascual-Peña, Lauren Tsai, Patrick Schwarzenegger, Nico Hiraga, and Poehler.

The film focuses on 16-year-old Vivian (played by Hadley Robinson), who starts a feminist zine to empower the young women in her high school, as they contend with bullying, sexual harassment, and rape.

The film was released on March 3, 2021, by Netflix and received mixed reviews from critics.

== Plot ==
Sixteen-year-old Vivian lives with her mother Lisa and attends Rockport High School. One day she joins her best friend Claudia at an exclusive class taught by Mr. Davies, where she notices that her classmate Seth “The Shrimp” has gotten taller and more attractive over the summer, and meets the new student, Lucy.

Mr. Davies then begins a discussion of The Great Gatsby, a novel about a mysterious millionaire. Lucy criticizes it as "another tale of a rich white guy expressing sorrow over not having the woman he wants." The star jock Mitchell interrupts her opinion, defending the character of Jay Gatsby.

Later, Vivian sees Mitchell taking the soda Lucy was trying to buy, harassing her, and spitting in it. When Lucy reports him to Principal Shelly, she does not want to penalize Mitchell and tries to avoid getting involved. Through her newfound friendship with Lucy, Vivian begins to notice sexism throughout the school treated as casual.

At home, Vivian goes through Lisa's stuff, finding her old feminist zines which inspire her. The next day at school, the students receive a sexist and perverse list from the jocks, which calls out many of the girls, embarrassing them, but which the boys all find "hilarious"; Mitchell calls Lucy a foul word. Vivian becomes inspired by her feminist mother and starts "Moxie", a zine aimed at calling out the unfair treatment of girls at the school, and empowering them to raise their concerns.

Vivian keeps "Moxie" a secret to everyone except a few other girls who have been put down, like Lucy and Claudia. Seth learns that Vivian created "Moxie" and, understanding the feminist cause, is proud of her, so they begin a relationship. Claudia, however, is less proud, and is unsure about the idea of the zine.

The girls champion Kiera, captain of the school's state champion soccer team and one of them, to win an athletic scholarship, but Mitchell, quarterback of the losing football team, receives it instead. Vivian walks home feeling depressed, drinking the bottle of champagne meant for Kiera's win along the way. She arrives home to find Lisa with her boyfriend John and is annoyed that her mother kept the relationship a secret from her. Vivian then throws up.

Later, the "Moxie" girls respond to Mitchell winning the award by putting crude stickers all over the school. Principal Shelly, who was called out by "Moxie" for not supporting the girls, attempts to shut down the group. Claudia, who joins the group, takes the fall for the stickers, but confronts Vivian for not coming forward about starting "Moxie".

Vivian starts to go through a rough patch with Seth. She then faces challenges with Lisa when Seth comes over for dinner with her mom's new boyfriend John and creates a scene. When confronted, Vivian confesses that she started Moxie and expresses her grief over her late father.

Vivian finds a note from an anonymous girl who says she was raped the previous year. She gets "Moxie" supporters to stage a walkout in support of the girl. The majority of students participate, and Vivian reveals to the rest of the school that she started "Moxie".

Head cheerleader Emma comes forward as the rape survivor, stating that her ex-boyfriend—Mitchell—was her rapist. It happened the previous year after prom when they were dating. When she was called the "Most Bangable", it left her mortified. All the students are horrified and lend their support. Principal Shelly overhears and plans to punish Mitchell at last for the rape and his sexist behavior.

Vivian reconciles with her mom, Claudia, and Seth, and "Moxie" gains more followers. Lisa expresses pride in her daughter and the girls throw a party in celebration of "Moxie".

== Cast ==
- Hadley Robinson as Vivian
- Lauren Tsai as Claudia
- Patrick Schwarzenegger as Mitchell
- Nico Hiraga as Seth
- Sydney Park as Kiera
- Josephine Langford as Emma
- Clark Gregg as John
- Josie Totah as CJ
- Alycia Pascual-Peña as Lucy
- Anjelika Washington as Amaya
- Charlie Hall as Bradley
- Sabrina Haskett as Kaitlynn
- Ike Barinholtz as Mr. Davies
- Amy Poehler as Lisa
- Marcia Gay Harden as Principal Shelly

In addition, The Linda Lindas play themselves, performing at a party.

== Production ==
In February 2019, it was announced Amy Poehler would direct the film, from a screenplay by Tamara Chestna, and serve as a producer under her Paper Kite Productions banner, with Netflix distributing. In October 2019, Hadley Robinson, Lauren Tsai, Patrick Schwarzenegger, and Ike Barinholtz joined the cast of the film. In November 2019, Josephine Langford, Marcia Gay Harden, and Clark Gregg joined the cast of the film.

=== Filming ===
Principal photography began in October 2019 in Arcadia, California.

== Release ==
The film was released on March 3, 2021, on Netflix.

== Reception ==
On review aggregator Rotten Tomatoes, the film has an approval rating of 70% based on 114 reviews, with an average rating of 6.5/10. The website's critics consensus reads, "Moxie comes up a little short on its titular ingredient when it comes to fully addressing its story's timely themes, but this sweet coming-of-age story is still easy to like." On Metacritic, it has a weighted average score of 54 out of 100 based on 25 critics, indicating "mixed or average reviews".

Rasha Jameel, writing in The Daily Star, accused the film of tokenism. Criticizing its "careless" insertion of the "white savior" trope, Jameel wrote, "the film adds characters of colour and a white character with disability, but instead of allowing these characters to speak or act on their behalf, the narrative is told primarily through the all-too-common perspective of a privileged white American."
