= Appendage (film) =

- Release poster
- Directed by: Anna Zlokovic
- Written by: Anna Zlokovic
- Produced by: Alex Familian; Katrina Kudlick; Hadley Robinson; Anna Zlokovic
- Starring: Hadley Robinson
- Cinematography: Powell Robinson
- Edited by: Alex Familian
- Music by: Nick Chuba
- Production company: 20th Digital Studio
- Distributed by: Hulu
- Release dates: March 11, 2023 (SXSW); October 2, 2023 (United States)
- Running time: 95 minutes
- Country: United States
- Language: English

Appendage is a 2023 American horror drama film written and directed by Anna Zlokovic and starring Hadley Robinson. It is Zlokovic's feature directorial debut, and is based on her short film of the same name, which premiered at the 2022 Sundance Film Festival.

== Plot ==
Hannah sits at a table with her parents when suddenly she feels a sharp pain in her side, and a bulge begins to appear. However, it soon stops. Later, we see Hannah sewing when she pricks her finger while her boyfriend goes to bed. The next morning, Hannah sees a stressful message on her phone, which causes the pain in her side to momentarily return. She ignores it and leaves for work.

At work, Hannah and her best friend noticed she bled on the cuff of her newly created dress, and her boss reprimanded her for it. Running into the bathroom, she sees the bulge beginning to bleed but plays it off as menstrual cramps. That night, her boyfriend tries to start fooling around but she stops him when he gets too close to her side. She makes up an excuse to leave. Back home while drawing, the bulge grows into a small, monstrous head with tiny arms. The small head begins to ridicule her until it bursts from her side, and she blacks out.

When she wakes up, the monster jumps on her, and she knocks it out by throwing it into a wall. After bandaging her side, she finds inspiration from her blood-soaked clothes to create a new design. Hannah takes the new blood-red jeweled white dress to her office, and her boss loves it. Hannah goes to a dermatologist, who says the "skin irritation" occurred on her birthmark and could have been caused by dual DNA from absorbing a twin while still inside her mother's womb.

Later, at the bar with her friend from work, Hannah becomes paranoid when her boyfriend starts to light up her friend's phone. She returns home to see the monster, who offers to help her. She ties the monster up and carries him out of the apartment to the basement.

The next morning, her boyfriend and best friend arrive together to take her out for a fun day, but she feels like the third wheel because of her suspicion that he is cheating with her friend. Hannah searches online and finds a meetup for people with similar dual DNA conditions. At the meetup, several other people admit to also having an "appendage" that they sedate once a week. Hannah buys the meds, has coffee with one of the other ladies at the meetup, and returns home to sedate her appendage. Kaelin arrives and attempts to confront her about her recent behavior but she gets angry and tells him to leave. At the office, she yells at Esther. Over the next several weeks, Hannah continues to sedate the appendage and hang out with Claudia from the meetup.

One night, Hannah recounts to Claudia that she once drove her car into a median in high school and ruined one of her parents' rich parties. Claudia states that you don't need to sedate the appendage right away. Instead, she listens as the appendage tells the truth about the future. When Hannah returns home, she listens to the monster, who states that Kaelin isn't cheating yet but is falling in love with Esther. She tries to use a syringe, but it's empty, and she passes out. Hannah wakes up to find the monster gone and her mother calls to remind her to pick up food for another party. After getting the food, Hannah vomits into it while her mother looks on, horrified, and begins to victim-blame Hannah for her own mental health problems.

After storming out, Hannah returns home, and the monster, who now looks like her but is covered in bloody puss, releases a wormy thing that enters Hannah and causes her to black out, taking her form completely. When she awakens, Claudia admits that she is actually the original Claudia's appendage who has taken over her life. Appendage-Hannah texts and makes up with both Esther and Kaelin. While dragging the real Hannah into the basement to tie her up, they bump into Esther, who becomes suspicious.

After finding success at Hannah's job, it's revealed all of the members of the meetup are appendages. The leader explains he has found a new way to kill their host that does not kill them either. In the meantime, Esther rescues the real Hannah and takes her to the hospital. Once realizing Kaelin is in trouble they both return to Hannah's apartment and fight appendage Claudia and appendage Hannah.

After emerging victorious in the fight, the real Hannah makes amends with her parents and keeps the now shrunken, baby-sized appendage in a crib in the attic.

== Cast ==
- Hadley Robinson as Hannah
- Kausar Mohammed as Esther
- Brandon Mychal Smith as Kaelin
- Desmin Borges as Cristean
- Emily Hampshire as Claudia
- Deborah Rennard as Stacy
- Pat Dortch as Steven
- Craig Kolkebeck as Fred

== Production ==
The film was shot in North Carolina and New York. According to cinematographer Powell Robinson, the film "is set in New York, but we filmed primarily in Wilmington, NC. We did do a little splinter day on the last day of production in NY itself where we shot a couple of exteriors as well as all the subway footage to help tie everything together geographically."

== Release ==
The film premiered at the 2023 South by Southwest Film & TV Festival on March 11, 2023. It was then released on Hulu on October 2, 2023.

== Reception ==
On the review aggregator website Rotten Tomatoes, 50% of 26 critics' reviews are positive. On Metacritic, the film has a weighted average score of 65 out of 100 based on 4 critics, which the site labels as "generally favorable" reviews.

Nick Allen of RogerEbert.com awarded the film three out of four stars, writing "Zlokovic's tone confidently moves between sincere emotional beats and horror-comedy, her story's expanding scope taking after 80s directors like John Carpenter and Larry Cohen". RogerEbert.com also listed the film as one of the top horror films of 2023. Dennis Harvey of Variety gave the film a negative review and wrote, "But despite the grotesque premise, its attack is a little too blunt to make much impact, whether taken as thinly-veiled satire or straight fantasy thriller."
