= The Wrong Girls =

2026 film by Dylan Meyer

- Theatrical release poster
- Directed by: Dylan Meyer
- Written by: Dylan Meyer
- Produced by: James Weaver; Alex McAtee; Seth Rogen; Evan Goldberg; Allison Rose Carter; Jon Read; Maggie McLean; Dylan Meyer; Kristen Stewart
- Starring: Kristen Stewart; Alia Shawkat; LaKeith Stanfield; Tony Hale; Zack Fox; Seth Rogen; Kumail Nanjiani; Kate McKinnon; Geena Davis
- Cinematography: Todd Banhazl
- Edited by: Kathryn J Schubert
- Music by: Ty Segall
- Production companies: Point Grey Pictures; Savage Rose Films; Nevermind Pictures; 100 Zeros; Curious Gremlin
- Distributed by: Neon
- Release date: August 14, 2026
- Running time: 100 minutes
- Country: United States
- Language: English
- Box office: $887,116

The Wrong Girls is a 2026 American stoner comedy film written and directed by Dylan Meyer in her directorial debut. The film stars Kristen Stewart, Alia Shawkat, LaKeith Stanfield, Tony Hale, Zack Fox, Seth Rogen, Kumail Nanjiani, Kate McKinnon, and Geena Davis. It follows two stoner best friends who are pursued by dangerous criminals after one of them is given a briefcase full of experimental drugs due to a case of mistaken identity.

The film was theatrically released in the United States by Neon on August 14, 2026. It received mixed reviews from critics.

== Plot ==
In Los Angeles, codependent best friends and roommates Frankie and Molly are two aimless and financially struggling young women who frequently smoke cannabis. Frankie is a Stanford dropout who works for a delivery company, while Molly is an aspiring chef who makes a living building spreadsheets and has a boyfriend named Josh, whom Frankie openly dislikes. They have two pet cats, Dio and GG, and are two weeks behind on rent.

At a rock concert, Frankie confronts her ex-boyfriend about dating her doppelgänger, a scientist named Frances, who leaves after her glasses break in the ensuing confusion. Frankie dons the glasses and heads to the bar, where she is approached by a mysterious man, Dave. Mistaking her with Frances, Dave takes Frankie to his apartment. He explains that he has been hired by Dr. Olsen and hands a drunken Frankie a steel briefcase with instructions to deliver it to Dr. Chapman.

The next morning, Frankie returns home with the briefcase, which she unlocks to find that it contains vials of a strange substance. Josh reads the accompanying instructions in Danish and learns that the substance is a psychedelic drug. While Frankie and Molly go to their favorite buffet restaurant, three Danish henchmen—Axel, Dagmar, and Fritz—ransack the women's house in search of the briefcase, but fail to find it.

Finding their house burglarized, Frankie and Molly decide to sell the drugs, but not before trying them. The women gain telepathic powers and are able to hear the thoughts of their cats. Unaware that they are being tailed by the Danish henchmen, Frankie and Molly gatecrash a private party at a lavish house and attempt to sell the drugs to the guests. Assuming that Axel is a potential buyer, Molly leaves him alone with the briefcase to find Frankie, whereupon Axel flees with it.

Frankie and Molly leave the party, and when the henchmen try to kidnap them, Dave appears and rescues the women. On the car ride, Molly learns that she can move objects with her mind after smoking a joint. At her laboratory, Danish scientist Dr. Olsen explains to Frankie and Molly that she has created the experimental drug from the left testicle of a giant squid in order to replicate its ability to communicate telepathically, but her employer intends to sell the telepathy as a mind control weapon. Dr. Olsen deduces that mixing her drug with cannabis produces the telekinesis.

In the morning, the women flee back home, and Frankie suggests to Molly that they leave town. When Dagmar arrives at their house with a gun, Frankie and Molly steal his car and drive to Josh's workplace. Molly tells Josh that they are being chased by armed henchmen, but he convinces her that she just needs to rest. When Molly tells Frankie she is no longer leaving town with her, Frankie berates Molly for not telling her of her plans to move in with Josh, and Molly retorts that Frankie has no focus and no goals.

The henchmen arrive and forcefully take Frankie and Molly to a warehouse, where the women are handcuffed in separate rooms. Frankie offers Dagmar and Fritz her cannabis-infused brownies, which render the men unconscious, before telekinetically retrieving the keys to free herself. After Frankie releases Molly, Dave rescues them as they are chased by the armed henchmen. When Axel holds Molly at gunpoint, Frankie convinces him to take her instead. As Axel leads Frankie to a pier, a giant pink bioluminescent squid drags Axel into the water. Frankie and Molly celebrate as the henchmen are arrested.

The next day, Frankie and Molly meet with Dr. Olsen and Dr. Chapman, who offer the women $100,000 each to participate in their scientific testing at Stanford. Frankie and Molly use the money to open a successful cannabis-infused food restaurant. In a car parked in front of their home, Frankie and Molly are smoking a joint as the Danish henchmen pull up in a black SUV on the other side of the street with guns in their hands. Unaware of the men's presence, Frankie and Molly drive away.

== Cast ==
- Kristen Stewart as Frankie/Frances
- Alia Shawkat as Molly
- LaKeith Stanfield as Not Metal Head Dave
- Zack Fox as Josh
- Tony Hale as Martin Flynn
- Chris Estrada as José
- Thomas La Barbera Christensen as Axel
- Thor Knai as Dagmar
- Thomas Nicholson as Fritz
- Seth Rogen as the voice of Dio
- Kumail Nanjiani as the voice of GG
- Kate McKinnon as Dr. Olsen
- Geena Davis as Dr. Chapman
- Cate Blanchett as deep sea expert
- Sugar Lyn Beard as Mr. Kock

== Production ==
The film is written by Dylan Meyer, who also serves as the director of the film. She wrote the story on personal experiences hanging out and getting high at home with her best friend. The script had been written over a decade ago and is what first brought her and Kristen Stewart together. Discussing the film in 2023, Stewart described it as a "stoner girl comedy" She is also a producer alongside Maggie McLean and Meyer for Nevermind Pictures, with Alex McAtee, James Weaver, Seth Rogen and Evan Goldberg for Point Grey Pictures, and Allison Rose Carter and Jon Read for Savage Rose Films. Scott Aharoni, Sinan Eczacibasi and Metin Alihan Yalcindag serve as executive producers for Curious Gremlin. It is distributed by Neon.

Stewart and Shawkat lead the cast which added Rogen, LaKeith Stanfield, Kumail Nanjiani, Zack Fox and Tony Hale in February 2025.

Todd Banhazl is cinematographer with singer-songwriter and composer Ty Segall involved in the project. Principal photography took place in Los Angeles with Punk band Mannequin Pussy giving a live performance at a closed Los Angeles DIY space. Filming began in February 2025 in Los Angeles and concluded in March 2025.

== Release ==
The film was theatrically released in the United States by Neon on August 14, 2026.

== Reception ==
On the review aggregator website Rotten Tomatoes, 61% of 77 critics' reviews are positive, with an average rating of 5.6/10. The website's consensus reads: "Proudly stupid and surprisingly sweet, The Wrong Girls coasts on Kristen Stewart and Alia Shawkat's chemistry, even as its barrage of stoner gags produces more genial laughs than truly memorable ones." Metacritic, which uses a weighted average, assigned the film a score of 59 out of 100, based on 20 critics, indicating "mixed or average" reviews.
