= Moxie (novel) =

2017 young adult novel by Jennifer Mathieu

- Author: Jennifer Mathieu
- Language: English
- Publisher: Roaring Brook Press
- Publication date: 2017
- LC Class: PZ7.M4274 Mox

Moxie is a 2017 young adult novel by Jennifer Mathieu. It was published September 19, 2017 by Roaring Brook Press. The book follows Vivian Carter, a high school student who discovers feminism and starts a zine at her school fighting for women's rights on campus. In 2021, a film based on the novel was released.

== Reception ==
Moxie was generally well-received by critics, including starred reviews from Booklist and Shelf Awareness. Shelf Awareness said that "girl revolution reads true" and ultimately called the book "work of solidarity, a call for change and a righteously enjoyable story of grrrl power". Booklist wrote,

The novel’s triumphs—and there are many—lie in the way the zine opens Vivian’s eyes to the way girls are treated, and to the additional roadblocks that her classmates of color face. Though the novel presents plenty of differing opinions, it never once pits girl against girl, and Vivian struggles with how to navigate a burgeoning relationship with a well-intentioned boy who doesn’t always understand what she’s fighting for. From an adult perspective, some of the ripped-from-the-headlines issues might seem like old news, but for teens like Vivian, who are just discovering how to stand up—and what to stand up for—this is an invaluable revelation.

In their primarily negative review, Kirkus Reviews wrote, "Designed to empower, the novel occasionally fails to consider that changing a culture of misogyny requires educating and embracing support from members of all genders." They specifically highlighted "troubling moments when Vivian excludes willing male participants, seemingly suggesting that achieving female empowerment requires gender separation". Additionally, they noted that the book "moves dangerously toward vigilante justice when it’s used to accuse a student of attempted rape". According to Kirkus, this decision, among others, "fails to educate readers that qualified police investigators, not school officials, must be alerted in accusations of criminal behaviors".

The audiobook also received positive reviews. School Library Journal "highly recommend[ed]" it. Booklist's Becca Boland commented on Suzy Jackson's narration, saying she "excels in depicting the teen voices, male and female, and clearly differentiates among social groups." She also noted that, despite the book being set in Texas, "there are very few Texas accents. ... The only accents are used for the principal and Viv’s grandparents, and they are used as a tool to emphasize an antiquated point of view." Boland called this "an interesting vocal choice" that "helps to universalize the themes of feminism and equality throughout the narration."

Moxie was nominated for several state-level awards, as well as the Goodreads Choice Award for Young Adult Fiction. In 2017, NPR and the Los Angeles Public Library named Moxie one of the best books of the year.
