= XOXO (film) =

- Digital release poster
- Directed by: Christopher Louie
- Screenplay by: Dylan Meyer
- Story by: Christopher Louie
- Produced by: Christopher Louie; Max Leitman; Joe Russell; Daniel Shafer; Pete Tong
- Starring: Sarah Hyland; Graham Phillips; Brett DelBuono; Hayley Kiyoko; Colin Woodell; Ryan Hansen; Ione Skye; Chris D'Elia
- Cinematography: Damián Acevedo
- Edited by: Sam Bauer; Debby Germinio
- Music by: Aaron Drake
- Production companies: Netflix; PrettyBird
- Distributed by: Netflix
- Release date: August 26, 2016
- Running time: 92 minutes
- Country: United States
- Language: English

XOXO is a 2016 American drama film directed by Christopher Louie and starring Sarah Hyland, Graham Phillips, Brett DelBuono, Hayley Kiyoko, Colin Woodell, Ryan Hansen, Ione Skye, and Chris D'Elia. It is based on a story by Louie and is written by Dylan Meyer. It was produced by Joe Russell, Christopher Louie, Daniel Shafer and Max Leitman.

The film was released on Netflix on August 26, 2016. It received mixed reviews.

== Premise ==
The lives of six strangers collide during a frenetic night of romance and dream chasing when a young DJ is given a chance to perform at a festival.

== Cast ==
- Sarah Hyland as Krystal
- Graham Phillips as Ethan
- Hayley Kiyoko as Shanni
- Colin Woodell as Ray
- Ryan Hansen as Avilo
- Ione Skye as Ethan's Mom
- Chris D'Elia as Neil
- Ian Anthony Dale as Anders
- Henry Zaga as Jordan
- Brianne Howey as Darla
- Medalion Rahimi as Nikki
- Marci Miller as Alien Girl
- Kelly Marie Tran as Butterfly Rave Girl
- Sean O'Pry as DJ Polaroid

== Music ==
=== Soundtrack ===
XOXO (Music from the Netflix Original Film)

Soundtrack album by Various Artists
- Released: August 26, 2016
- Genre: Electronic, EDM, progressive house
- Length: 58:54
- Label: Big Beat Records

XOXO (Music from the Netflix Original Film)
No.	Title	Music	Length
1.	"Make Me Feel"	Galantis and East & Young	3:27
2.	"All I Ever Wanted"	Michael Brun featuring Louie	4:13
3.	"Song from the Sun"	Yotto	3:57
4.	"Momento"	Mambo Brothers	7:36
5.	"Signal"	Zaxx	3:41
6.	"Me & You"	Alok featuring Iro	5:27
7.	"im Friends W 25 Letters of the Alphabet, I Dont Know Y"	Graves & Dreamer	2:57
8.	"Beats Knockin (Jack Ü Remix)"	Skrillex & Diplo featuring Fly Boi Keno	2:53
9.	"Keep It 100" (Keys N Krates live version)	Grandtheft & Keys N Krates	2:03
10.	"Ding Dong"	Hitchhiker	2:36
11.	"Indian Summer"	Jai Wolf	4:08
12.	"You & Me" (Flume Remix)	Disclosure featuring Eliza Doolittle	4:42
13.	"Gold Dust"	Galantis	3:54
14.	"Something About You" (ODESZA Remix)	Hayden James	5:41
15.	"One Last Night on Earth"	Dada Life	3:50
16.	"Home" (Lane 8 Remix)	Icarus featuring Aurora	7:47

== Production ==
In July 2015, it was announced Sarah Hyland, Chris D'Elia, and Graham Phillips, had joined the cast of the film, with Dylan Meyer writing the screenplay, while Netflix will produce and distribute the film. That same month, Hayley Kiyoko and Colin Woodell joined the cast of the film, while Christopher Louie wrote the story and directed the film. In June 2016, Pete Tong joined the film as a producer and music supervisor.

To achieve an authentic portrayal of the EDM setting, filming took place at three live music festivals.

== Release ==
XOXO was made available through Netflix on August 26, 2016. It ran for one week at the Laemmle Royal theater in Los Angeles August 24 through August 31.

=== Reception ===
On review aggregator Rotten Tomatoes, the film holds an approval rating of 71% based on 7 reviews, with an average rating of 5.81/10. Nick Murray opined in The Village Voice that the film "may be as predictable as an EDM song, but it too offers pleasures to those willing to give themselves over to its rhythms."
