= Saved by the Bell (2020 TV series) =

2020 American sitcom

- Genre: Teen sitcom
- Created by: Sam Bobrick
- Developed by: Tracey Wigfield
- Starring: Haskiri Velazquez; Mitchell Hoog; Josie Totah; Alycia Pascual-Peña; Belmont Cameli; Dexter Darden; John Michael Higgins; Elizabeth Berkley Lauren; Mario Lopez
- Theme music composer: Scott Gale (performed by Lil Yachty)
- Composer: Jeff Cardoni
- Country of origin: United States
- Original language: English
- No. of seasons: 2
- No. of episodes: 20

Production
- Executive producers: Tracey Wigfield; Franco E. Bario; Peter Engel; Trent O'Donnell
- Producers: Elizabeth Berkley Lauren; Mark-Paul Gosselaar; Mario Lopez; Tiffani Thiessen; Josie Totah; Aaron Geary & Ben Steiner; Amy-Jo Perry; Lark Voorhies; Matt Murray
- Cinematography: Tom Magill
- Editors: Mat Greenleaf; Jonathan Pledger; Richie Edelson; Jamie Nelsen
- Camera setup: Single-camera
- Running time: 24–31 minutes
- Production companies: Big Wig Productions; Universal Television; Peacock Originals

Original release
- Network: Peacock
- Release: November 25, 2020 – December 1, 2021

Saved by the Bell is an American television sitcom developed by Tracey Wigfield that premiered on November 25, 2020, on Peacock. It is a revival to the original television series of the same name created by Sam Bobrick and follows some of the same characters.

The entire main cast from the original Saved by the Bell series reprised their roles in the revival, with the exception of Dustin Diamond (who died over 2 months after the series premiere) and Dennis Haskins as Screech and Mr. Belding, respectively. The series received generally positive reviews from critics, with praises going towards the performances of Hoog and Totah.

In January 2021, the series was renewed for a 10-episode second season which was released on November 24 and December 1, 2021. In May 2022, the series was canceled after two seasons.

== Plot ==
The series is set 26 years after Zack and Kelly's wedding, with the main characters of the original series reunited in their 40s and trying to navigate their lives. A new generation of students enter the Bayside High School, but conflicts arise as Zack Morris, now the Governor of California, shuts down all the low income high schools in the impoverished districts and transfers the less fortunate students to wealthier and higher performing schools in the state's richer areas, including Bayside.

== Cast ==
=== Main ===
- Haskiri Velazquez as Daisy Jiménez, a smart, ambitious, and underprivileged sophomore who is excited at the prospect of attending Bayside High after her local school gets shut down
- Mitchell Hoog as Mac Morris, the handsome, charming, privileged son of Governor Zack Morris and Kelly Morris
- Josie Totah as Lexi Haddad-DeFabrizio, a sharp-tongued cheerleader who has her own reality show
- Alycia Pascual-Peña as Aisha Garcia, Daisy's fun-loving but ultracompetitive best friend and Bayside High's new starting quarterback
- Belmont Cameli as Jamie Spano, the not-so-bright captain of the Bayside football team and Jessie's sensitive man-child son
- Dexter Darden as DeVante Young, a new student at Bayside who has a love for high school musicals
- John Michael Higgins as Principal Ronald Toddman, who took over Mr. Belding's role as the head of Bayside High. He originally attended Bayside High along with the original gang, even if none of them (apart from Lisa) remembers him.
- Elizabeth Berkley Lauren as Jessie Spano, Jamie's mother and a school counselor at Bayside High. She has a Ph.D. in Educational Psychology, is a New York Times best-selling author of parenting books, gave TED Talks and was involved in politics. She is married to her struggling writer husband, René.
- Mario Lopez as A.C. Slater, a physical education teacher and football coach at Bayside High

=== Recurring ===
- Mark-Paul Gosselaar as Zack Morris, a former Bayside High student who is now former Governor of California and Mac's father He is married to his high school sweetheart Kelly Kapowski.
- Tiffani Thiessen as Kelly Morris, Mac's mother, Zack Morris' wife, and the First Lady of California. Zack and Kelly appear (uncredited) in the first, eighth and tenth episodes of the first season.
- Lark Voorhies as Lisa Turtle, a fashion designer and former Bayside High student who now lives and works between Los Angeles and Paris
- Ed Alonzo as Max, a magician and the owner of The Max
- Tricia O'Kelley as Jade Huntington-Snell, a member of the Bayside PTA who advocates for the Douglas High kids to leave Bayside
- DeShawn Cavanaugh as Colt Cassidy, Jamie's friend who's also on the Bayside High football team
- Abraham Rodriguez as Spencer Buckley, one of the students at Bayside High
- Mariah Iman Wilson as Nadia, one of the students at Bayside High. DeVante has a crush on her.
- Kellen Joseph as The Fish, star wrestler at Bayside High.
- Corey Michael Bangi as Mason, one of the students at Bayside High
- Alyssa Jirrels as Yasmin, one of the students at Bayside High and Lexi's friend
- Brandon Marcel as Greg, one of the students at Bayside high
- Cheyenne Jackson as René, Jessie's estranged husband and Jamie's father who is a struggling writer
- Patrick Thomas O'Brien as Mr. Dewey, the Bayside High math teacher from the original series
- Matthew Sato as Gil Vatooley (season 2), Daisy's love interest
- Ariela Barer as Chloe (season 2), Aisha's love interest

=== Guest ===
- Selenis Leyva as Ms. Jimenez, Daisy's hardworking mother
- Courtney Lopez (Mario's real-life wife) as Michelle, a woman whom Slater meets on a blind date and later starts dating

== Episodes ==
=== Series overview ===
Season	Episodes	Originally released	
Season	Episodes	First released	Last released
1	10	November 25, 2020	
2	10	November 24, 2021	December 1, 2021

=== Season 1 (2020) ===
No. overall	No. in season	Title	Directed by	Written by	Original release date
1	1	"Pilot"	Trent O'Donnell	Tracey Wigfield	November 25, 2020
Douglas High students Daisy, Aisha and Devante are forced to transfer from their low-income high school to one of the most affluent schools in the state, Bayside High, after Governor Zack Morris closes Douglas High due to budget cuts. Bayside's new principal Ron Toddman, guidance counselor Jessie Spano, and physical education teacher A.C. Slater try to make the new kids feel as welcome as possible. At Bayside High, Daisy, Aisha and Devante meet students Mac, Lexi and Jamie. Aisha decides to try out for the football team. Slater inspires Devante to try out for the school musical. Daisy tries to run for class president but discovers that it's much harder for her to compete than the privileged Mac and Lexi, who both only want to become class president so they can have the best parking space. After realizing that the class president has real responsibilities, Mac and Lexi decide to help Daisy win.
2	2	"Clubs and Cliques"	Trent O'Donnell	Josh Siegal & Dylan Morgan	November 25, 2020
Devante and Lexi get the leads in the school musical. Devante struggles to fit in with Lexi and the other musical theatre kids. Slater tells Jessie that he's unsure if he should give Aisha a spot on the men's football team since he's worried she could get hurt. Jessie convinces him to put her on the team. Slater makes Aisha quarterback, which was previously Jamie's spot. Jessie struggles to tell her son, Jamie, that Aisha is better at football than him. Daisy's English teacher tells Daisy that she doesn't expect her to hand in the summer reading assignment, since she just transferred to Bayside High. Daisy feels like the teacher underestimates her and decides to do the assignment anyway. Mac, who didn't do the assignment, is now also forced to hand in the assignment the next day. Daisy tries to inspire Mac to prove their teacher wrong, but Mac instead convinces some of the parents that the book they're supposed to do the assignment on, Frankenstein, is racist. After Daisy reveals that she spent the whole night working on the assignment, Mac decides to (partly) do the assignment as well.
3	3	"The Bayside Triangle"	Katie Locke O'Brien	Amy-Jo Perry	November 25, 2020
After thirty iPads are stolen from Mr. Toddman's office, the Douglas students realize that everyone suspects one of the Douglas students did it. Daisy and Aisha suspect that Devante did it. After a fight with Devante, Aisha decides to write a note that Devante did it and puts it in a suggestion box. She later realizes her mistake and tries to fix this but ends up incriminating herself. After Mr. Toddman discovers that the iPads were simply misplaced, he clears Aisha's name. Mac and Jamie both try to ask someone out, but don't seem to realize that it's the same girl, Pamela, they have their eye on. Lexi convinces Daisy that it's better to let them figure it out themselves. Daisy still tells them, after which the boys start a prank war to determine who will date Pamela. Mac is winning, but Daisy forces Pamela to choose one of the boys. Pamela picks Jamie. An upset Lexi reveals to Daisy that she has a crush on Jamie, who was probably never going to win from Mac and thus never going to date Pamela. After a speech from Slater, the boys decide not to let Pamela ruin their friendship.
4	4	"The Fabulous Birchwood Boys"	Kabir Akhtar	Matt Warburton	November 25, 2020
As class president, Daisy is obligated to plan and organize the Harvest Dance for which the school has reserved a $10,000 budget. To cut costs Daisy tells Mr. Toddman his band, The Birchwood Boys, can play at the dance. Mac tells Daisy to only settle for the best things and plan the dance like she is 'a rich person'. She fires Mr. Toddman's band, which hurts his feelings. Daisy's new bossy attitude also causes all the volunteers to drop out, leaving Daisy to decorate the gym alone. Mac eventually convinces all the volunteers to come back and help decorate. Daisy also asks Mr. Toddman's band to still play at the dance. Lexi inspires Devante to take acting in the school musical more seriously and tell his other friends about the musical. Jamie takes Aisha to the Harvest Dance.
5	5	"Rent-A-Mom"	Daniella Eisman	Aaron Geary & Ben Steiner	November 25, 2020
Jessie tells Daisy she thinks Daisy's perfect for a summer leadership program in New York. Daisy is afraid to ask her mom's permission since she thinks her mom, who is always working, needs her to take care of her little brother during the summer break and isn't able to afford a babysitter. After Jessie leaves a message on her mom's answering machine, Daisy asks Mac and Lexi to help her think of a way to prevent Jessie and her mom from meeting. Mac and Lexi hire a professional actress to pretend to be Daisy's mom and set up a meeting between Jessie and Daisy's fake mom. When Jessie finds out that Daisy was lying and encourages her to tell the truth. Daisy finally tells her mom about the summer leadership program. Her mom promises that Daisy can go and that she'll figure out a way to make it work. Meanwhile, Aisha and Slater concoct a scheme to make the football team more competitive. Jamie reveals that he has feelings for Aisha. Jessie finds out her husband René intends to stay at his writers' retreat for six more months.
6	6	"Teen-Line"	Matthew A. Cherry	Erin Fischer & Shantira Jackson	November 25, 2020
After all cellphones are confiscated at Bayside High, the students slowly start to go insane. Mac, who has two cellphones, starts charging students 25 cents per minute to use his second phone. Devante is accused of physical abuse by a high school theater critic named Tanner after Devante, Tanner and Lexi have a conversation regarding Tanner's negative review about the school musical. Tanner's mother, Jade, starts advocating for Devante's expulsion from the school. After Mac finds evidence that Tanner wasn't even at the high school musical performance, Lexi, Daisy and Mac confront Tanner and force him to convince his mother to back down. Aisha accidentally sends Jamie a voicenote saying that she could never date anyone as dumb as Jamie. When Jamie finds out, he's upset but quickly forgives her, and they start dating.
7	7	"House Party"	Angela Tortu	Yamara Taylor	November 25, 2020
Mac and Lexi hatch a scheme to break Aisha and Jamie up during Jamie's big birthday party. Jessie goes to visit René at the retreat. After Aisha gets upset at seeing how rich Jamie is, they have a fight. Lexi feels bad and convinces Jamie and Aisha to make up. She tells Mac that she has had a crush on Jamie for years. Daisy gets drunk for the first time and imagines she is on Euphoria. Slater and Toddman go on a blind double date, where Slater meets a woman named Michelle, who he has an instant connection with. Jessie calls Slater to ask him if he is able to shut down the party and he immediately leaves his date. Instead of shutting down the party, Slater ends up partying alongside the students. However, after the police try to shut the party down and mistake Slater for a parent, he realizes he should act his age and sends everyone home. René and Jessie come back home. After seeing them together Slater texts Michelle to arrange a second date.
8	8	"The Todd Capsule"	Kabir Akhtar	Tracey Wigfield & Beth Coyle	November 25, 2020
Governor Zack Morris and First Lady Kelly Morris decide to visit Bayside during Homecoming weekend. Slater, Jessie, Zack and Kelly decide to dig up their old time capsule to reminisce about their time at Bayside. Mr. Toddman reveals that he went to high school with them and was even present during some important moments, including Zack and Kelly's wedding. All four of them admit that they don't remember him. They call their friend Lisa Turtle, who is now a famous fashion designer living in Paris. Lisa tells them she does remember Ron and that he indeed went to high school with them. They try to make it up to him by reforming the band Zack Attack (which Zack later realizes only became famous in a dream he had). After Toddman becomes the victim of one of Mac's pranks, Zack is able to convince Toddman that they were all pulling a prank on him and have known he went to school with them all along. Daisy and Lexi raise a lot of money for charity, but are shocked to discover that the money is instead being used by Jade to renovate Douglas High so all the transferred students can go back to their old school. Note: The original 1989 theme song is used in the title sequence of this episode.
9	9	"All in the Hall"	Claire Scanlon	Dashiell Driscoll & Marcos Gonzalez	November 25, 2020
Daisy and Aisha try to find a way to keep the Douglas students at Bayside. Mac and Lexi realize that they care about Daisy, Aisha and Devante and decide to help them. Daisy tries to file some paperwork at city hall but is sadly too late. Devante and Mr. Toddman visit the newly renovated Douglas High, where Mr. Toddman calls Jade a 'greasy witch'. Jamie proposes to Aisha so she can live with him and stay at Bayside, which freaks her out. After Jamie realizes that Aisha doesn't seem to care as much for him as he does for her, they decide to break up.
10	10	"Showdown"	Trent O'Donnell	Matt Warburton	November 25, 2020
Students from all cliques band together to stage a school-wide walkout. Jessie realizes that René is never there for her and Jamie and decides to file for divorce. Slater apologizes to Jessie for always telling her to calm down and tells her that he now realizes that she was always right about questioning the school's decisions during their time as students. He promises to fight alongside her from now on. Lexi reveals to Jamie that she has feelings for him and he admits that he also likes her. They kiss just as Aisha, who has since realized that she does love Jamie as much as he loved her, walks in. The students are disappointed to find out that Zack intends to allow the Douglas students to be sent back because he is afraid of losing his re-election campaign. After Mac pleads with Zack, the latter relents and signs an executive order putting a three-year freeze on all school openings and closures, effectively keeping all Douglas kids at Bayside until graduation. As the students look forward to another carefree year at Bayside, Mac gets a notification alerting him to something called the 'coronavirus'.

=== Season 2 (2021) ===
No. overall	No. in season	Title	Directed by	Written by	Original release date
11	1	"The Last Year Dance"	Daniella Eisman	Tracey Wigfield	November 24, 2021
A year has passed since the end of season 1 and now the students are back at Bayside for their junior year. Daisy, in order to win student election, decides to host a dance with all the themes of events they missed in the previous year. Meanwhile, the adults remember their friend Screech, and help Jamie cope when Jessie decides to get a divorce.
12	2	"The Mac Tapes"	Matthew A. Cherry	Josh Siegal & Dylan Morgan	November 24, 2021
When Coach Slater injures himself, multiple complaints from parents force Principal Toddman to ban football from Bayside. This causes Aisha to join wrestling, which she finds out she is not as good at as she wants to be. Meanwhile, Daisy gets a crush on the new vice president of the Bayside Student Council, Gil.
13	3	"1-900-Crushed"	Claire Scanlon	Aaron Geary & Ben Steiner	November 24, 2021
Lexi and Aisha's fight over Jamie disrupts the Teen Line phone-a-thon. Daisy tells Gil that she has a crush on him. Slater and Jessie cut school, to make up for the Cut Day that Jessie missed back in high school.
14	4	"The Substitute"	Trent O'Donnell	Amy-Jo Perry	November 24, 2021
When Mac annoys a teacher to his breaking point, he quits Bayside. The plan goes awry when Zack becomes the new substitute, and Mac begins to feel inferior when all his peers pay attention to his father instead of him. To solve this problem, Mac attempts to come up with a scheme to get his father to lose his job at Bayside. Meanwhile, DeVante meets his new girlfriend Nadia's parents, but feels like a charity case when they give him a free car. Things get even worse when the car is accidentally dented by Spencer, and DeVante tries to hide it from Nadia.
15	5	"From Curse to Worse"	Heather Jack	Chris Schleicher & Jen Chuck	November 24, 2021
Daisy tells her mother that she and Gil are dating. However, when her grandmother tells her that Gil is cursed, Daisy becomes fearful when she notices her academic performance slipping. At the same time, a trans girl is banned from the soccer team of a nearby school. Lexi is outraged, and over-ambitiously tries to write a play to end transphobia.
16	6	"Wrestling with the Future"	Katie Locke O'Brien	Yamara Taylor	November 24, 2021
It's Career Week at Bayside, and Zack, Lisa and Kelly return to Bayside to help out. Each of the kids attempts to figure out their passion, while Kelly and Lisa encourage Jessie to date again after her divorce. However, they are unaware that Slater has realized he has romantic feelings for Jessie again, which spirals out of control when Zack bets Slater to tell Jessie how he feels.
17	7	"La Guerra de Aisha"	Maureen Bharoocha	Marcos Gonzalez & Victoria González	December 1, 2021
Aisha has a cultural identity crisis when a racist Spanish teacher tells her that she speaks "street Spanish." While Daisy remains passive to get an easy A, Aisha convinces her to stand up for what is right and decolonize their Spanish class. Meanwhile, Jamie tries to find out what his talent is for the Spirit Competition.
18	8	"The Gift"	Mark-Paul Gosselaar	Dashiell Driscoll & Yedoye Travis	December 1, 2021
Jessie tries to convince Kelly to apply to medical school and take the MCATs. Meanwhile, Lexi pressures DeVante to become a famous singer. DeVante meets with a record producer, who wants to sign him immediately. However, the one catch is that DeVante's manager tries to force him to drop out of school, leading DeVante to think about a difficult decision. In addition, Mac realizes he has feelings for Daisy. Lexi and Jamie attempt to stop Mac when he goes on a pranking spree to humiliate Gil in front of Daisy.
19	9	"Dancing to the Max"	Jamie Sheridan	Beth Coyle & Erin Fischer	December 1, 2021
When all of Bayside's spirit hours are lost, Slater suggests a dance-a-thon to make up for the 15,000 hours. Aisha realizes she likes a girl and comes out as bisexual. While everyone is busy with the dance-a-thon, Slater and Jessie prank Valley to get back at them, but end up getting stuck in an air vent.
20	10	"Let the Games Begin"	Kabir Akhtar	Chris Schleicher	December 1, 2021
After a long year, the spirit competition finally happens. Bayside and Valley's rivalry comes to a head when Principal Toddman tells them that Valley whispered something to Zack back in the 1990s which caused him to lose. Jamie finally discovers his special talent; Aisha debates over coming out to Daisy; Slater and Jessie grapple with their feelings after they kiss.

== Production ==
=== Development ===
On September 17, 2019, it was announced that a single-camera revival of the series was in development for NBC's planned streaming service, Peacock, with Tracey Wigfield serving as showrunner. Wigfield would also executive produce the show alongside Franco Bario and Peter Engel, producer and executive producer of the original series, respectively. Funny or Die's Dashiell Driscoll, the executive producer of the web-series Zack Morris Is Trash, was hired as a staff writer for the show, along with 50 Central's Shantira Jackson, among others. On January 19, 2021, Peacock renewed the series for a 10-episode second season. On May 4, 2022, Peacock canceled the series after two seasons.

=== Writing ===
Executive producer and showrunner Tracey Wigfield developed the idea alongside Berkley and Lopez, who joined the show also as producers. Wigfield called it “a reimagining” of the original series, not a reboot. “While the original show was a Saturday morning show for kids, this is a single-camera, kind of edgier comedy. If you never saw the (original), it's just a funny show about high school in 2020”.

Berkley noted that the new series would “maintain that heart with all of the humor”, appealing to both the new generation and the original fans. In order to maintain consistency with the original series, “time-outs” were included in the plot, along with fourth wall breaks, other Easter eggs and in-jokes. Wigfield encouraged her staff to watch the old episodes and "think about them through a 2020 lens." Due to his knowledge of the original show's storylines, writer Dashiell Driscoll was often the writers' room's advisor regarding trivia and story consistency.

Lopez stated that the way writers had set the characters to where they are now “was pretty clever”. According to Wigfield, Berkley was "very smartly protective of Jessie" in the way the character was conceived in the new series. "I wanted to remain true to the fact that Jessie was a bit ahead of her time. So I wanted to make sure that when we reconnected with her we understood what she actually has accomplished" Mark-Paul Gosselaar publicly appreciated the fact that new Zack was "a little offensive and sort of not being on the right side of things". The character of Mr. Toddman was written as a principal “constantly being pranked by his privileged students and yelled at by their entitled parents” but gets a second chance to make a difference when Bayside High “gets an influx of new, low-income students.”

When Wigfield approached transgender actress Josie Totah to play transgender cheerleader Lexi, she offered the actress a producing credit in order for her to have a voice in the writing process. "The more we got to talking about the character and her storyline, specifically her gender identity, it became clear to me that if I was going to do the show, I needed to have more stake in it. I was so grateful that Universal and [showrunner] Tracey Wigfield really championed me and allowed me to be a producer on this project because I didn't feel comfortable doing a show that explored my character's gender identity if representation didn't exist".

The production shutdown caused by the COVID-19 pandemic forced the writers to change the three remaining teleplays and to simplify some details in order for the shooting to be viable for the new protocols. The writing team was reassembled for a couple of weeks in August and, according to Wigfield, most of the changes "was just stuff that we had to simplify or we couldn't shoot at the school anymore. Anything that took place at the gym or in the theater, or anything else in an actual school, we had to move to the lot. So we had to make some changes there." A reference to the coronavirus was also added.

=== Casting ===
Elizabeth Berkley and Mario Lopez were initially announced as the only cast members of the original series to be reprising their roles and it was reported that they would also serve as producers on the show. Mark-Paul Gosselaar confirmed at the time that neither he nor his former co-star, Tiffani Thiessen had been officially approached.

On December 17, 2019, it was reported that John Michael Higgins had signed on to play Mr. Toddman, Bayside High's newest principal. On January 6, 2020, The Hollywood Reporter reported that 18-year-old actress Josie Totah had joined the cast of the comedy as Lexi and that she would also be credited as a producer on the show. On January 24, 2020, Deadline announced that Dexter Darden had joined the cast as well in an undisclosed role and on January 27, Haskiri Velazquez, Mitchell Hoog, Alycia Pascual-Pena and Belmont Cameli were announced.

In January 2020, it was confirmed that Mark-Paul Gosselaar would also be returning but only for three episodes due to his commitment as a series regular on ABC's Mixed-ish. It was reported that Gosselaar would also be serving as an executive producer. In March 2020, Gosselaar also confirmed that Tiffani Thiessen would be reprising her role in one episode. Thiessen later ended up appearing in three episodes of the first season. Both Gosselaar and Thiessen decided to go "unbilled" for their acting work and were merely credited as producers.

In early 2020, Lark Voorhies explained that she was not initially invited to be part of the show's reunion as well as other cast members events while appearing on television for the first time in years on The Dr. Oz Show to discuss her mental health issues. During an interview in September 2020, Lopez stated that Voorhies would indeed be guest-starring as Lisa Turtle, and NBC officially announced Voorhies' involvement with the series the following month.

Allegedly, Dustin Diamond publicly expressed disappointment for not being invited to reprise his role of Samuel "Screech" Powers in the new series, as the only cast member who had been featured as a leading character in every previous incarnation of Saved by the Bell. The character of Screech, however, was referenced throughout the show's first season. Tracey Wigfield stated that the role of Screech, despite being mentioned, "wasn't tied to any of the new characters or anything" in the first season but that the door was open for Diamond to appear in future seasons. Diamond died on February 1, 2021, after having revealed he had small-cell lung carcinoma just a few weeks earlier, precluding any future appearances.

In November 2020, it was announced that Dennis Haskins would not be reprising the role of Mr. Belding in the first season of the new series.

Actors Troy Fromin and Matt Kaminsky, who had appeared in the original show as Ox and Russian chess player Peter Breschnev respectively, made brief appearances as different characters: Fromin played the second man in line in the episode All in the Hall, while Kaminsky appeared as a delivery man in The Bayside Triangle. Rich Eames and Scott Gale, the music composers of the original show, made a cameo appearance together as part of the Birchwood Boys band.

=== Filming ===
Due to their involvement as producers during the pre-production process, both Mario Lopez and Elizabeth Berkley had to cancel their appearances at the Steel City Con in Monroeville, Pennsylvania, originally scheduled on December 7–8.

The first table read was held at Universal Studios on December 17, 2019, as announced by both Berkley and Lopez on their Instagram accounts. Throughout pre-production, DVDs of the original series were available in the production office for the young actors to watch, if needed.

Filming officially began on January 10, 2020, with Lopez giving fans a first look of the new series with a video of Berkley, Ed Alonzo and himself shooting their first scene at The Max diner, built at Universal Studios. The pilot, shot in 7 days, wrapped on January 20. Unlike the original series (that was almost-completely directed by one single helmer, Don Barnhart), the new show was scheduled to be directed by different directors for different episodes. Primetime Emmy-winner Kabir Akhtar, Academy Award-winner Matthew A. Cherry and Daniella Eisman were among the new directors hired to helm each episode. The series was shot using single-camera setup and without a live studio audience, unlike the original, multi-camera sitcom.

Since the original sketches were lost, production designer Joseph Lucky had to use screenshots and pictures as references in order to recreate the iconic original sets, including the school's hallway, Mr. Belding's office and The Max. "Trying to mimic someone else's work isn't as easy as it seems, so the challenge there for me was to actually get it right and then to put my touches on it", Lucky said to Variety. For the textures and design elements of the new sets, Lucky took inspiration from Piet Mondrian's work "for additional flare" and the red color of the lockers (originally used only in the first two seasons of the show) was chosen to complement the maroon in the Bayside logo. Exterior scenes were shot in several locations in Burbank and Los Angeles, including the Universal Studios backlot.

On March 13, 2020, production was halted due to the COVID-19 pandemic in the United States during the pre-production of episode 1.08, before Gosselaar, Thiessen and Voorhies could film their scenes. With three episodes left to be filmed, the series eventually resumed production on August 17 and wrapped five weeks later, in mid-September 2020.

On May 4, 2021, Mario Lopez told Yahoo! Entertainment that the show's second season would feature a tribute to Dustin Diamond, saying: “We’re planning something special we haven’t gotten into yet.” After a series of virtual table readings, filming for Season 2 officially began on Monday, June 7, 2021, at Universal Studios, as shared by Lopez and Elizabeth Berkley in their social media.

== Release ==
The show was originally set to be released over the summer. When production for the last three episodes were delayed amid the COVID-19 pandemic, the release date was pushed back to November 25, 2020. All ten episodes were released exclusively on Peacock Premium, with only the pilot being available to stream for free in the platform. The second season was released on November 24, 2021.

=== Marketing ===
On April 15, 2020, Peacock released the first official teaser for the series, featuring scenes from the first seven episodes of the show It was followed by a second teaser launched on August 10, 2020. On October 27, 2020, an official trailer featuring Gosselaar and Thiessen was released. Two days later, Peacock released a first-look promotional still of Lark Voorhies back in character.

On July 29, 2020, Mark-Paul Gosselaar and Dashiell Driscoll launched Zack to the Future, a weekly podcast available on Apple Podcasts, Spotify, Entercom's Radio.com and other platforms. Every week, Gosselaar and Driscoll dissected one episode from the original series' first run, "analyzing iconic show moments and discussing “never-before-heard stories” from the set with featured guests". Elizabeth Berkley, Mario Lopez, Tiffani Thiessen, Breckin Meyer, Ed Alonzo, Bennett Tramer (writer of the original series) along with Allyson Thurston and Jennifer Schelling (who played the Zeffirelli Twins from 1989 until 1991) were among the special guest stars of the podcast.

On November 15, Elizabeth Berkley and Mario Lopez were presenters at the 46th People's Choice Awards ceremony, where host Demi Lovato dubbed their appearance "a Saved by the Bell reunion". The Los Angeles Times described their moment as a "must-see", also because award receiver Jimmy Fallon gave his acceptance speech on mute via Zoom. On November 16, Peacock launched a free Saved by the Bell channel including the original series, the two TV movies Saved by the Bell: Hawaiian Style and Saved by the Bell: Wedding in Las Vegas and the spin-off series Saved by the Bell: The College Years. The following day, the main cast described their feelings on returning to Bayside High in a featurette video exclusively debuted by People's official website. In the video, actor Dexter Darden made it clear that there were "no laugh tracks" in the new show. On November 18, Peacock unveiled the new theme song, an updated version of the original one performed by rapper Lil Yachty.

On November 25, the day the show premiered, original cast members Elizabeth Berkley, Mario Lopez, Mark-Paul Gosselaar and Tiffani Thiessen were guests on The Tonight Show Starring Jimmy Fallon.

A three-day marathon of the original episodes aired on E! starting on Friday, December 11 at 12 p.m. The marathon included the U.S. television premiere of the new show's pilot, that aired on December 13 at 9 p.m.

== Reception ==
=== Critical response ===
For the series, review aggregator Rotten Tomatoes reported an approval rating of 76% based on 42 critic reviews, with an average rating of 6.9/10.The website's critical consensus reads, "Though the intended grade isn't always clear, Saved By The Bell’s capable cast of newcomers make Bayside's halls their own in a reboot that's smart, self-aware, and seriously funny." Metacritic gave the series a weighted average score of 71 out of 100 based on 16 critic reviews, indicating "generally favorable reviews".

Several critics were given three non-sequential episodes to review, including the pilot. Jen Chaney of Vulture gave the series a positive review, dubbing it "a self-aware satirical delight" and described the pilot as "the strongest first episode of a comedy I’ve seen all year." She also appreciated the "charming" new cast and complimented Hoog's "particularly strong" performance and the work of "the reliable great John Michael Higgins." According to Variety’s Amber Dowling, the show was a "pleasant surprise" led by a "brilliant young cast". She applauded showrunner Wigfield and the writing team for "masterfully" weaving all the best elements of the original show into the new series and was impressed by the trans character Lexi, "whose history is explained but never told through the filtered lens of trans struggle. It's a significant portrayal that pushes the conversation beyond gender identity". David Betancourt of the Washington Post gave the show a positive review, noting that it had "a big advantage over other reboots [being] really good". Describing the series as "a funnier and more culturally relevant reimagining of Bayside High", Betancourt applauded it for its "standout cast of young newcomers", especially the "much needed Afro-Latina representation" personified by Haskiri Velazquez and Alycia Pascual-Peña. "Having these chicas take center stage in a new SBTB world matters". Josh Sorokach of Decider described the series as "an irreverent, immensely enjoyable blast from the past, but also a worthy successor to the original series" and praised the "standout" performances of Josie Totah and Mitchell Hoog. "In the wrong hands, the characters of Lexi and Mac Morris could skew towards unlikable, but Totah and Hoog imbue these posh teens with an inherent affability." He also described Higgins’ portrayal of Principal Toddman as "an absolute joy to watch." In his review forTVLine, Dave Nemetz gave the series a B+ grade, calling it "surprisingly good" and "a cleverly constructed, highly tongue-in-cheek reinvention that pokes plenty of fun at its inspiration while finding genuine laughs of its own."

Alan Sepinwall of Rolling Stone described the series as a "clever recontextualization by Wigfield, acknowledging that some of the antics that seemed adorable in the Nineties were actually awful". He thought that it was "a bold choice not only to treat Zack as an outright villain, but to cast his doppelganger of a son in the same light" but on the other hand, being the series also addressed to the original fans, it wasn't "the safest choice to rub their noses in Zack having been a monster all along." He praised Totah's "very funny and utterly natural" performance but noted that "the grand unified field theory behind what Wigfield's attempting makes more sense than, say, the weird blend of sitcom antics, soap plot-twists, and faux documentary realism of the short-lived BH90210, but it doesn't quite hang together." Samantha David-Friedman of Attractions Magazine appreciated the "always-hilarious" John Michael Higgins and noted how the show, despite being a comedy, addressed "more complicated issues like financial disparity, racial profiling, and the complex social challenges faced by modern teens." She described the series as "the perfect mix of new and old" and that "the only thing missing so far" was Screech. Margaret Lyons of The New York Times appreciated the "quick and funny" series and the "strong performances from the new cast" but criticized "the moments of friction [...] from the adult characters grafted in from the original". She called Zack and Kelly "vacuous and awful" but commended the overall product as a "good" and "wholesome revival".

Alex Maidy of JoBlo.com was more negative in his review, giving it a 4 out of 10 vote and describing it as "one of the worst shows of 2020." Maidy criticized the series for not having "idea who its target audience is" and for being "poorly written", although he highlighted the "decent cast" and described the roles of Daisy, Aisha and DeVante as "far more interesting characters than they deserve to be." Also negative was Charles Bramesco's review for The Guardian, who disliked the work of the "pretty bad [young] actors" and criticized the "laziness" of the writing ("About every third joke lands, and that's a generous estimate"). He recognized that Wigfield had "good sense to realize that a show set at a moneyed SoCal high school cannot avoid the question of income inequality and how it trickles down into the public education system" and that the project "needed a justification for its own existence beyond nostalgia for the first Bush administration, and notwithstanding its many other flaws, Wigfield has smartly managed that much." He gave the show a 2 out of 5 rating and added that "the relative praise of 'for a Saved by the Bell reboot, it's pretty good!' has been fairly earned. Still, a show about the subtle patronization of lowered expectations shouldn't be aspiring to little more than exactly that." Jamie Jirak of Comicbook appreciated the episodes and called the series a "perfect blend of laughs, nostalgia, and social awareness". She also described the series as "the best attempt at reviving a sitcom we've seen" and added that it was "absolutely worth a Peacock subscription." She praised the "excellent use of A.C. Slater and Jessie Spano", the cast's "great work" and the "solid writing." Angela Henderson-Bentley of The Herald-Dispatch found the show to be more intense than the original: "This is not the same Bell, nor does it even try to be. And I honestly think that's why it works. There are lessons at the end of each half-hour, only now they feel much deeper and more important than they did in the 1990s." The Detroit News’ Adam Graham gave the series a B score and defined the "progressive" show as "a throwback that looks forward, embracing the past while living in the now" able to show "that you can teach the old school some new tricks." He also appreciated the art direction ("the set is lovingly recreated in sharp detail").

Rob Owen of the Pittsburgh Tribune-Review felt that tonally, "the new Bell rings cheekier and more meta than any previous iteration" but that "Daisy's tendency to break the fourth wall to confer with viewers produces some chuckles, but after a while the gimmick wears thin." He praised Josie Totah's performance ("she steals focus in every Bell scene she's in) and dubbed her "the most original element" in the show. Having seen only three episodes, Owen added: "More writing like [Totah's lines] and this Bell might be worth saving". Candice Frederick of TV Guide gave it a 2.5/5 score in her mixed review. She described the updated versions of the original characters as "funny" (dubbing Elizabeth Berkley's Jessie as "smart and ambitious") but found it hard to understand if the show was aimed for the original fans, for the new generation, or if it was just a satire of itself. "If it's all of those things, Saved by the Bell is having way too much fun to make any of these statements very well." Judy Berman of Time approved Velazquez' "effervescent" performance and described Totah as "the strongest performer in the franchise" but wasn't convinced by Wigfield's too "pessimistic depictions of systemic inequality" pushed to "the verge of [triviality]" and ultimately dubbed the show "a punchy, intermittently inspired, well-intentioned mishmash".

The second season has a 100% approval rating on Rotten Tomatoes, with an average score of 8.2/10 based on 5 reviews.

=== Controversy ===
The series sparked controversy over its references to Selena Gomez's 2017 kidney transplant. In the series' sixth episode "Teen-Line", two jokes were made regarding the identity of the artist's kidney donor (who was in fact her close friend, Francia Raisa). The jokes drew backlash from fans, who perceived them as offensive and disrespectful; the phrase "Respect Selena Gomez" trended on Twitter. Peacock, Universal Television, and the show's executive producers subsequently issued a statement, "We apologize. It was never our intention to make light of [Gomez]'s health. We have been in touch with her team and will be making a donation to her charity, The Selena Gomez Fund for Lupus Research at USC." The scenes were subsequently removed from the show by Peacock.

=== Accolades ===
Year	Award	Category	Nominee	Result	Ref.
2021	GLAAD Media Awards	Outstanding Comedy Series	Saved by the Bell	Nominated	
2021	Imagen Awards	Best Supporting Actor – Television (Comedy)	Mario Lopez	Nominated	
2021	Imagen Awards	Best Supporting Actress – Television (Comedy)	Alycia Pascual-Peña	Nominated	
2021	Imagen Awards	Best Supporting Actress – Television (Comedy)	Haskiri Velazquez	Nominated	
2022	Critics' Choice Television Awards	Best Supporting Actress in a Comedy Series	Josie Totah	Nominated	
2022	GLAAD Media Awards	Outstanding Comedy Series	Saved by the Bell	Won	
2022	Imagen Awards	Best Primetime Program – Comedy	Saved by the Bell	Nominated	
