= Hadley Robinson =

American actress (born 1995)

- Born: December 5, 1995 (age 30); New York City, US
- Education: Juilliard School (BFA)
- Occupation: Actress
- Years active: 2014–present

Hadley Robinson, (born December 5, 1995) is an American actress. Her roles include the box office hit Little Women (2019) where she plays Sallie Gardiner Moffat, the television series Utopia (2020) in the recurring roles of Charlotte and Lily, and Moxie (2021) as the lead, Vivian.

She played the role of Jeanie Buss in the HBO series Winning Time: The Rise of the Lakers Dynasty.

In 2023 Robinson starred in the George Clooney-directed film The Boys in the Boat, appearing as Joyce Simdars.

== Early life and education ==
Hailey Robinson was born in New York City and grew up in the Vermont. There she graduated from Middlebury Union High School in 2013. She also lived abroad in England and Switzerland, where she began acting. Her formal studies in theater took place at the Interlochen Arts Academy in Michigan and later at Juilliard. Robinson's first onscreen roles were in student-directed short films made at Interlochen.

== Filmography ==
=== Films ===
Year	Film	Role	Notes
2014	Burning		Short film
2014	Violets Are Blue	Mae	Short film
2019	Little Women	Sallie Gardiner Moffat	
2019	Look at Me		Short film
2020	I'm Thinking of Ending Things	Laurey / Tulsey Town Girl 1	
2021	Moxie	Vivian	
2022	The Pale Blue Eye	Mattie	
2023	Appendage	Hannah	
2023	Anyone but You	Halle Spence	
2023	The Boys in the Boat	Joyce Simdars	
2025	The History of Sound	Belle	

=== Television ===
Year	Title	Role	Notes
2019	Fosse/Verdon	Caroline	Episode: "Providence"
2020	Utopia	Lily / Charlotte	Recurring role
2022–2023	Winning Time: The Rise of the Lakers Dynasty	Jeanie Buss	Main cast
2025	Mountainhead	Hester	TV movie

=== Soundtrack ===
Year	Title	Notes
2020	I'm Thinking of Ending Things	Performer: "Many a New Day"
