= Alycia Pascual-Peña =

American actress

- Born: March 19, 1999 (age 26)
- Education: Marist University
- Years active: 2010–present
- Known for: Saved by the Bell

Alycia Pascual-Peña (born March 19, 1999) is an American actress known for her role in Saved by the Bell.

== Career ==
Pascual-Peña began her career as a model, modeling for companies such as Neiman Marcus and JCPenney. In 2011, Pascual-Peña was cast as Clara in the television series Chase. Pascual-Pena attended Marist College, where she majored in communications and political science. In 2020, Pascual-Peña was cast as Aisha Garcia in the Saved by the Bell reboot. Her character was not originally an Afro-Latina character, but was re-written to be Latina after she was overheard speaking Spanish on set.

In 2021, Pascual-Peña played Lucy in the Netflix film Moxie.

== Filmography ==
=== Film ===
| Year | Film | Role | Notes |
|---|---|---|---|
| 2021 | Moxie | Lucy | |

=== Television ===
| Year | Title | Role | Notes |
|---|---|---|---|
| 2011 | Chase | Clara | Episodes: "Roundup", "Seven Years" |
| 2018 | The Plug | TT | Episode: "Bird Gets A Pass" |
| 2020-2021 | Saved by the Bell | Aisha Garcia | Main role |
| 2022 | The Neighborhood | Yoli | Episodes: "Welcome to the Stakeout", "Welcome to the Quinceañera" |
| 2024 | Bel-Air | Amira | Recurring |
