= Mountainhead =

2025 film by Jesse Armstrong

- Release poster
- Genre: Satire; Comedy drama
- Written by: Jesse Armstrong
- Directed by: Jesse Armstrong
- Starring: Steve Carell; Jason Schwartzman; Cory Michael Smith; Ramy Youssef
- Music by: Nicholas Britell
- Country of origin: United States
- Original language: English

Production
- Executive producers: Jesse Armstrong; Frank Rich; Lucy Prebble; Jon Brown; Tony Roche; Will Tracy; Mark Mylod; Jill Footlick
- Cinematography: Marcel Zyskind
- Editors: Mark Davies; Bill Henry
- Running time: 109 minutes
- Production companies: Hot Seat Productions; Project Zeus; HBO Films

Original release
- Network: HBO
- Release: May 31, 2025

Mountainhead is a 2025 American satirical comedy drama television film written and directed by Jesse Armstrong in his feature directorial debut, and starring Steve Carell, Jason Schwartzman, Cory Michael Smith, and Ramy Youssef.

The film follows four billionaire friends on a secluded weekend retreat as the world goes through major turmoil.

== Plot ==
Four wealthy friends meet for a retreat amidst growing global upheaval caused by AI-generated disinformation, produced and disseminated via social media platform Traam. Among them are Venis "Ven" Parish, owner of Traam and the world's richest person; Jeff Abredazi, owner of Bilter, a company specializing in AI; Randall Garrett, an older member and mentor of the group who has recently received an incurable cancer diagnosis; and Hugo "Souper" Van Yalk, who, because of his $521 million net worth, is significantly less wealthy than his multi-billionaire friends.

The retreat takes place at Souper's new remote Utah mountain home, dubbed "Mountainhead" (in reference to Ayn Rand's novel The Fountainhead). Though the gathering is ostensibly an opportunity for the four men to reconnect as friends (dubbed the "Brewsters") without the interference of their usual business concerns, all four have their own ulterior motives. Ven, having fast-tracked new features to Traam that enabled the disinformation to spread, wishes to acquire Bilter for its fact-checking technology to avoid rescinding the new features and taking accountability. Randall wishes to see Traam continue to grow and progress, believing Ven's ventures could lead to a transhumanist solution for his illness. Jeff sees his net worth skyrocket as the turmoil worsens due to Bilter's fact-checking abilities, and does not want his company subsumed into Traam. Souper, feeling inferior for never having made a billion dollars, wishes to petition the others to invest in Slowzo, his "lifestyle super-app".

The group tries to settle into the gathering, but soon after arriving Jeff and Ven begin arguing over Traam's effects, before the rest of them try to pressure Jeff into selling Bilter. They later snowmobile to and walk up a nearby mountain range, before conducting a Brewster ritual where they write their net worth on their chests in lipstick (ranked Ven, Randall, Jeff, and Souper). When they return, they realize the worldwide chaos caused by Traam has become worse and governments are beginning to falter, and the four get increasingly combative and exasperated. After Bilter's stock surges again, Jeff's net worth outranks Randall's, and Randall flips out on Jeff for making a big deal out of swapping Brewster hats.

After Ven has a call with the President where he rebuffs attempts to either roll back or limit Traam's features, Ven, Randall, and Souper decide to use their influence to accelerate the chaos in an attempt to bring about a global technocratic dictatorship. Jeff privately approaches Randall, who is one of Traam's biggest investors, with a proposal to wrest control of the company from Ven and cooperate with the US government's desires to install security measures. Randall, believing Jeff's plan will ruin his hope of surviving cancer, discloses the scheme to Ven and Souper, and the three of them conceive a tenuous plot to kill Jeff and take control of Bilter.

After two bungled attempts on his life by the other three, Jeff leads them on a chase through the house, eventually hiding out in the sauna. He is found and barricaded in by the others, who prepare to immolate him with gasoline. In desperation, Jeff hastily drafts the terms of an agreement to sign Bilter over to Traam, with the others agreeing to release him after working out the details.

The next morning, Jeff is released after the contract is signed and awkwardly confronts his unapologetic friends at breakfast. The three also admit that they have lost interest in their plan to launch coups against multiple governments. As he prepares to leave Mountainhead, Jeff has a private conversation with Ven telling him he will try to fight the deal.

Ven then asks him to do the deal legitimately, to which Jeff agrees on the condition that Randall be excluded. Jeff tells Ven that he believes Traam will fail even with Bilter's help, while Ven professes faith in his company. Jeff tells Ven if he does become part of Ven's company, he will eventually try to force Ven out, to which Ven replies, that is what makes it exciting.

Randall witnesses the end of this exchange from afar, and rides away from Mountainhead looking dejected. The film comes to a close with Souper, having finally achieved billionaire status through the deal with Jeff, overlooking the scenery of the mountains surrounding his home while following a meditation exercise on Slowzo.

== Cast ==
- Steve Carell as Randall Garrett
- Jason Schwartzman as Hugo "Souper" Van Yalk
- Cory Michael Smith as Venis "Ven" Parish
- Ramy Youssef as Jeffrey "Jeff" Abredazi
- Hadley Robinson as Hester
- Andy Daly as Casper
- Ali Kinkade as Berry
- Daniel Oreskes as Dr. Phipps
- David W. Thompson as Leo
- Amie MacKenzie as Janine
- Ava Kostia as Paula

== Production ==
The film was written and directed by Jesse Armstrong and executive produced by Armstrong, Frank Rich, Lucy Prebble, Jon Brown, Tony Roche, Will Tracy, Mark Mylod, and Jill Footlick. It was released on HBO and HBO Max in the United States, and Sky Atlantic in the United Kingdom. The cast includes Steve Carell, Jason Schwartzman, Cory Michael Smith, Ramy Youssef, Andy Daly and Hadley Robinson.

The film took under six months to produce, with production designer Stephen Carter being approached in December 2024 before a script, location, or cast had been decided. Armstrong began writing the script in January 2025, with the movie being fast-tracked for development by HBO. A number of locales were considered, including the tropics or a private island, before a "Shining-esque mansion" in the snow was decided on. After scouting for a suitable location in areas like British Columbia, Wyoming and Colorado, principal photography took place in Park City, Utah in March 2025. It is set almost entirely in a single location, a 21,000 ft^{2} seven bedroom mansion that was between owners at the time of filming. Filming took around five weeks, with other locations like the private jet scenes being shot on green screen sets.

== Release ==
In April 2025, still images from the film were released along with an announcement of the broadcast date on HBO and HBO Max, scheduled for May 31, 2025.

== Reception ==
=== Critical response ===
On the review aggregator website Rotten Tomatoes, 73% of 97 critics' reviews are positive, with an average rating of 6.4/10. The website's consensus reads: "Continuing writer-director Jesse Armstrong's sterling streak of skewering the rich and powerful, Mountainhead counterbalances its repellent characters with terrific acting and dialogue." Metacritic, which uses a weighted average, assigned the film a score of 66 out of 100, based on 31 critics, indicating "generally favorable" reviews.

Adam Graham of The Detroit News gave the film a B and wrote, "This satirical portrait of modern masculinity among today's tech bro masters of the universe is smart, sharp and very of the moment. It's funny when it's not terrifying." Laura Venning of Empire gave the film 4 out of 5 stars, writing, "Darkly funny as it descends into farce and ends on a chilling final note, Mountainhead is, unfortunately, truly a film for the 2020s. Just don't chase it with a doomscrolling session." Linda Holmes of NPR wrote, "While the four men at Mountainhead are targets of Armstrong's withering stink-eye for their amoral, antisocial approaches to the world, the stake he drives through their hearts is how unremarkable they are in every way except that they are rich." Sam Adams of Slate wrote, "For all its absurdist touches, Mountainhead hits hardest—and, not to put too fine a point on it, harder than just about any movie released in theaters this year—when it's more quietly observant." John Anderson of The Wall Street Journal wrote, "For all the bright writing and smart performances, who wants to spend this much time with such a repellent collection of characters? It's a lot of work for a Saturday night."

On June 4, 2025, it was reported that the film is the most-watched HBO original film since Bad Education, drawing 1.3 million viewers across linear and streaming platforms to date.

=== Accolades ===
Year	Award	Category	Recipient(s)	Result	Ref.
2025	Primetime Creative Arts Emmy Awards	Outstanding Television Movie	Jesse Armstrong, Frank Rich, Lucy Prebble, Tony Roche, Jon Brown, Will Tracy, Jill Footlick, and Mark Mylod	Nominated	
2026	ACE Eddie Awards	Best Edited Feature Film (Non-Theatrical)	Bill Henry and Mark Davies	Nominated	
2026	Artios Awards	Outstanding Achievement in Casting – Film, First Released for Television or Streaming	Francine Maisler, Molly Rose, Amber Wakefield, and Jeff Johnson	Nominated	
2026	Critics' Choice Awards	Best Movie Made for Television	Mountainhead	Nominated	
2026	Critics' Choice Awards	Best Supporting Actor in a Limited Series or Movie Made for Television	Ramy Youssef	Nominated	
2026	Directors Guild of America Awards	Outstanding Directorial Achievement in Movies for Television	Jesse Armstrong	Nominated	
2026	Golden Trailer Awards	Best Comedy	Humble / HBO / Create Advertising Group	Nominated	
2026	Gotham TV Awards	Outstanding Performance in an Original Film	Cory Michael Smith	Won	
2026	Producers Guild of America Awards	Outstanding Producer of Televised or Streamed Motion Picture	Mountainhead	Nominated	
