= Jennifer Mathieu =

American author

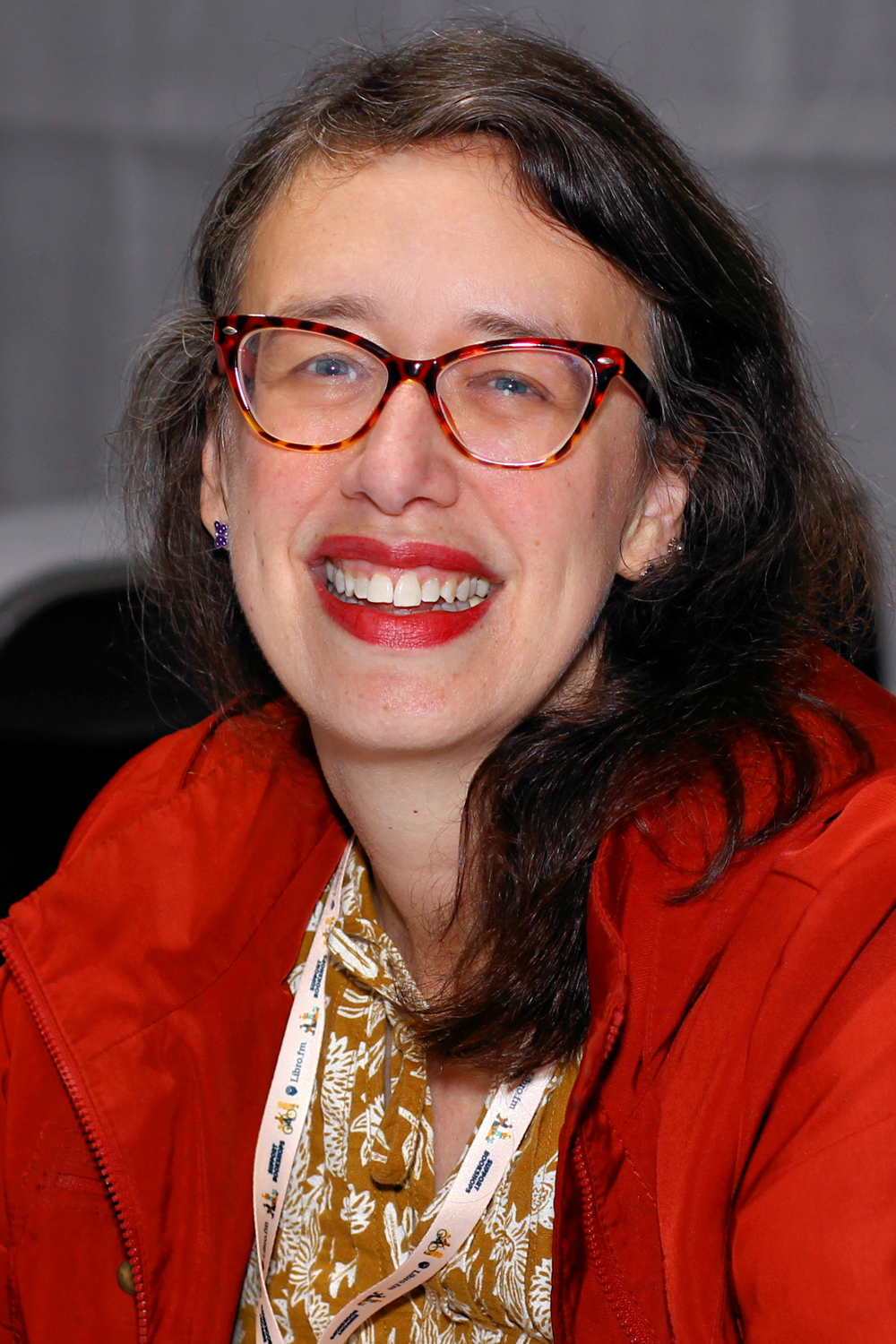
- Mathieu at the 2023 Texas Book Festival
- Occupation: Writer of young adult fiction
- Notable work: Moxie; The Truth About Alice

Jennifer Mathieu is an American author of young adult fiction. Her 2017 novel Moxie was adapted into a film of the same name.

Mathieu grew up on the East Coast of the United States and now lives in Texas with her family. She originally worked as a journalist and is currently an English teacher and writer of young adult novels.

== Awards and honors ==
Moxie and The Truth About Alice are Junior Library Guild books.

Awards for Mathieu's writing
Year	Title	Award	Result	Ref.
2016	Devoted	Amelia Bloomer Book List	Top 10	
2018	Moxie	Amelia Bloomer Book List	Selection	
2018	Moxie	Quick Picks for Reluctant Young Adult Readers	Selection	

== Publications ==
=== Novels ===
- The Truth About Alice (2014)
- Devoted (2015)
- Afterward (2016)
- Moxie (2017)
- The Liars of Mariposa Island (2019)
- Bad Girls Never Say Die (2021)
- Down Came the Rain (2023)
- The Faculty Lounge (2024)

=== Short stories ===
- "Dynamite Junior" in Fierce Reads: Kisses and Curses, edited by Lauren Burniac (2015)
