= East Willy B =

East Willy B is a comedic Web series that profiles Latinos in the gentrifying neighborhood of Bushwick in Brooklyn, New York City. Described as a Puerto Rican Cheers, its episodes generally run six to nine minutes online and tackle themes such as love, race, gentrification, entrepreneurship, and more. The series aims to promote Latino voices in media outlets.

== The series ==
The series, created by Julia Ahumada Grob and Yamin Segal, follows the life of Willie Jr. and his bartender friend, Ceci Rivera. The show documents the process where a Latino neighborhood starts to change, with young hipsters moving to Bushwick in search of the next hot Brooklyn neighborhood. As rents increase in Bushwick, Brooklyn (or "East Williamsburg") due to gentrification, Ceci and Willie organize their neighborhood to save Willie's bar. The show also follows Willie's attempts to win back his former fiancé from his nemesis. Many of Bushwick's "quirky characters" are included in the show, including a "bodega CEO, piragua (shaved ice) purveyors, local artists, family drunks, sassy women, local beggars, salsa music lovers, as well as the unwanted 'hipsters.'"

The cast and crew are predominantly Latino, though a much larger audience will relate to the themes in the series. The show also portrays the divide between the different Latin American cultures. To date, two seasons of the series have been produced. Episodes are released on YouTube, and on the show's website.

The New York Times dubbed the series a "Latino Show for a New Generation."

In 2013, East Willy B was nominated for an Imagen Foundation Award for "Best Web Series: Comedy." East Willy B was also highlighted in IndieWire as one of the thirteen "Critic's Picks" of 2013 for comedy web-series.

The characters are:

- Willie Jr.
- Ceci
- Maggie
- Albert
- Cesar
