= Marsupilami (1993 TV series) =

American animated television series

- Genre: Comedy
- Based on: Marsupilami by André Franquin
- Developed by: Ed Wexler
- Written by: John Behnke; Rob Humphrey; Jim Peterson; Bill Kopp
- Directed by: Jeff DeGrandis (Shnookums and Meat segments); Bob Hathcock (Sebastian segments); Ed Wexler (Marsupilami segments)
- Voices of: Steve Mackall; René Auberjonois; Dan Castellaneta; Jim Cummings; Steve Landesberg; Tress MacNeille; Jason Marsden; Frank Welker; Samuel E. Wright
- Theme music composer: Roy Braverman
- Composers: Stephen James Taylor; Mark Watters; Jean-Michel Bernard; Roy Braverman
- Country of origin: United States
- Original language: English
- No. of seasons: 1
- No. of episodes: 13 (39 segments)

Production
- Running time: 30 minutes
- Production company: Walt Disney Television Animation

Original release
- Network: CBS
- Release: September 18 – December 11, 1993

Related
- Raw Toonage; The Shnookums & Meat Funny Cartoon Show

Marsupilami is a half-hour American animated television segment series that first appeared on television as short series that aired in the 1992 program Raw Toonage, and was then spun off into his own eponymous show on CBS for the 1993 season. The show was based on the character from the popular comic book by Belgian artist André Franquin et al.

There were three segments in the half-hour show — Marsupilami, Sebastian, and Shnookums and Meat.

== Segments ==
=== Marsupilami ===
The main segment Marsupilami deals with the adventures of Marsupilami (voiced by Steve Mackall) and his friends Maurice the Gorilla (voiced by Jim Cummings) and Stewart the Elephant (voiced by Dan Castellaneta). Some episodes of Marsupilami would have him either evading Eduardo the Jaguar (voiced by Steve Landesberg) or outwitting a human named Norman (voiced by Jim Cummings). Many one off characters also appears in the series like the three baby monkeys (featured in Hey, Hey, They're the Monkeys!, all voiced by Jim Thurman) and their clown owner, Norman's Aunt Bethie (featured in Romancing the Clone and Safari So Good, voiced by June Foray), Leonardo the Lion (featured in Jungle Fever, voiced by Jim Cummings) and Cropsy (featured in Cropsy Turvy), a myth that proved to be real.

=== Sebastian ===
Sebastian (main character voiced by Samuel E. Wright) from The Little Mermaid is a segment which takes place in various locations out of the sea after the end of the events of The Little Mermaid, Ariel has become human, married Prince Eric, moved onto land, and almost never has any time to drop by and visit her old friends in the ocean. Flounder and Scuttle have also moved on with their lives now that their best friend Ariel is living away on land. Sebastian has some new adventures, with some of them having him outwit Chef Louie (voiced by René Auberjonois). The events in this segment seem to show that both Sebastian and Louie moved away from the coastal area where The Little Mermaid took place, even though they both returned in the second film, though deliberate anachronisms were made as modern-day locations and objects are seen throughout the segment for the sake of comedy.

=== Shnookums and Meat ===
Shnookums and Meat was a secondary segment on this show which would later spin-off into its own show. This segment involves a cat named Shnookums (voiced by Jason Marsden) and a dog named Meat (voiced by Frank Welker) who did not get along very well. Their owners are unseen stock characters only viewed from the neck down and named (appropriately enough) Husband & Wife (voiced by Steve Mackall and Tress MacNeille). Husband is always referring to their home as their "domicile" before the two leave their pets in charge while they are away.

== Cast ==
- René Auberjonois as Chef Louie
- Dan Castellaneta as Stewart the Elephant
- Jim Cummings as Maurice the Gorilla, Norman, Leonardo the Lion
- Steve Landesberg as Eduardo the Jaguar
- Steve Mackall as Marsupilami, Husband
- Tress MacNeille as Wife
- Jason Marsden as Shnookums
- Frank Welker as Meat
- Samuel E. Wright as Sebastian the Crab

== Crew ==
- Bob Hathcock – director (Sebastian segments)
- Ed Wexler – director (Marsupilami segments)
- Ginny McSwain – dialogue director (Marsupilami segments)
- Jamie Thomason – voice director (Sebastian segments)
- Bill Kopp – voice director (Shnookums and Meat segments)

== Production ==
There were 13 episodes in the series, which lasted one season and ended on December 11, 1993. Reruns of the show were aired on The Disney Channel (from October 1994 to June 1995), and later on Toon Disney. Each of the 13 episodes would feature one new "Marsupilami" segment, then one segment either featuring "Sebastian the Crab or "Shnookums and Meat", and then an old "Marsupilami" short, from "Raw Toonage". Three of the 16 "Marsupilami" shorts made for "Raw Toonage" – "Wanna Be Ruler", "The Young and the Nestless", and "Hot Spots" – were not included in the 1993 "Marsupilami" series, but do appear on the PAL video releases.

The original Marsupilami comic stories by Franquin never had a speaking Marsupilami and never featured a gorilla or elephant in the Marsupilami's wild habitat, since these species are native to Africa, while the Marsupilami species in the comic version was said to come from South America. Another change is that Disney's animated Marsupilami can speak, whereas his comic counterpart can only mimic sounds like a parrot.

=== Legal issues ===
In September 1997, U.S. District Senior Judge Edward Rafeedie ordered Disney to pay Marsu B.V. nearly $10.4 million in damages for breaching its promise to make 13 half-hour episodes. The lawsuit stated that Disney favored some of the company's other franchises such as Aladdin or The Little Mermaid. By March 1999, Disney still owed $9.3 million to Marsu B.V.

== Episodes ==
No.	Title	Original release date
1	"Working Class Mars"	September 18, 1993
1	"StC: King of the Beach"	September 18, 1993
1	"The Hairy Ape"	September 18, 1993
Corporate head Norman hires Mars and Maurice as office workers, to his regret. Lifeguard Sebastian tries to kick out a seagull that has made her nest in his lifeguard chair. Norman traps Maurice to take to the zoo, telling Mars that he is taking him to a party, but Mars wants to go, too.
2	"Normzan of the Jungle"	September 25, 1993
2	"StC: Room Service"	September 25, 1993
2	"Bathtime for Maurice"	September 25, 1993
Norman learns hypnosis and intends to use it to control all the jungle animals as Normzan. He hypnotizes Maurice to make him his sidekick. Hotel clerk Sebastian has to keep everything quiet for guest Chef Louie, who is at the breaking point because of a failed restaurant opening. Mars has to go through a lot of trouble to get filthy Maurice to take a bath.
3	"Hole in Mars"	October 2, 1993
3	"StC: Crab Scouts"	October 2, 1993
3	"The Treasure of the Sierra Marsdre"	October 2, 1993
Golfing expert Norman challenges Mars to a betting game of golf, and regrets it. Sebastian takes the Crab Scouts on a hike, always stressing the value of the Crab Scout Manual. Norman spies on Mars and Maurice planning to go on a treasure hunt, and worms his way into joining them.
4	"The Wizard of Mars"	October 9, 1993
4	"StC: TV Jeebies"	October 9, 1993
4	"The Puck Stops Here"	October 9, 1993
A strong windstorm blows Mars all the way to the Land of Oz, with Maurice playing a composite of the Scarecrow, Tin Man, and Cowardly Lion, and Norman playing the Wicked Witch of the West. A TV executive keeps casting Sebastian and Chef Louie in various television pilots. Norman uses the hotel air conditioning system to freeze the lake, and then challenges Mars to a game of hockey.
5	"Mar-Sup-Du-Jour"	October 16, 1993
5	"S&M: Kung-Fu Kitty"	October 16, 1993
5	"Romancing the Clone"	October 16, 1993
Mars first meets Eduardo, a Spanish leopard who wants to eat Mars. Shnookums the cat is alarmed when his owners buy a guard dog named Meat, but he learns kung-fu to defend himself. The premiere short. Norman dresses up as a female Marsupilami to deceive a tourist that is trying to take a picture of a marsupilami, but Mars falls in love with Norman.
6	"Toucan Always Get What You Want"	October 23, 1993
6	"S&M: I.Q. You, Too"	October 23, 1993
6	"Fear of Kites"	October 23, 1993
Mars protects a baby toucan from Eduardo and tries to teach it how to fly. The cat and dog use brain-enhancing devices to come up with evermore violent pranks to commit against each other. Mars and Maurice's kite gets tangled up on the hotel rooftop, but bellhop Norman will not let them inside to retrieve it.
7	"Mars' Problem Pachyderm"	October 30, 1993
7	"S&M: Night of the Living Shnookums"	October 30, 1993
7	"Mars Meets Dr. Normanstein"	October 30, 1993
Mars tries to cure the many phobias of his friend Stewart, the scaredy elephant. On a stormy night, Meat thinks he has killed Shnookums, but it is not the last he has seen of the cat. Mars and Maurice take refuge from a rainstorm in the home of Dr. Normanstein, who wants to use Maurice's brain for his monster.
8	"Steamboat Mars"	November 6, 1993
8	"S&M: Something Fishy"	November 6, 1993
8	"Someone's in the Kitchen with Mars"	November 6, 1993
Norman tries to smuggle a rare bird out of the jungle by transporting it in his steamboat, but he runs into Mars fishing for piranhas. The pet fish learns how to make itself evolve, and turns into a giant monster that terrorizes Shnookums and Meat. Chef Norman steals Mars and Maurice's big basket of fruit. Mars and Maurice track him to the hotel kitchen.
9	"Hey, Hey! They're the Monkeys"	November 13, 1993
9	"S&M: Jingle Bells, Something Smells"	November 13, 1993
9	"Prime Mates Forever"	November 13, 1993
A trio of thuggish baby monkeys abandoned by a circus clown rob Mars of his nest. Meat's smelly sock fells Santa Claus, and now the cat and dog must drive the sleigh in his place. Mars helps Maurice try to romance a tough female gorilla.
10	"Thorn O'Plenty"	November 20, 1993
10	"StC: Basic Insting"	November 20, 1993
10	"Witch Doctor Is Which?"	November 20, 1993
Mars pulls a thorn out of Eduardo's paw, and so the leopard now feels he must save Mars's life before he can eat him. Sebastian unknowingly gets a fishhook tangled on his back, and a nearsighted female scorpion falls in love with him. Witch Doctor Norman places a series of curses on Mars so that he instead of Mars will be the happiest person in the jungle.
11	"A Spotless Record"	November 27, 1993
11	"StC: A Boy and His Crab"	November 27, 1993
11	"Mars vs. Man"	November 27, 1993
Mars loses his spots from eating bad fruit. A reluctant Stewart knows how to cure him and ends up taking Mars and Maurice to where a cure might be found. Sebastian waits out crab season by being the pet of a boy who thinks he is a dog. Foreman Norman uproots Mars's tree to make space for his condominiums, but Mars squats in one of them.
12	"Cropsy-Turvy"	December 4, 1993
12	"StC: A Crabby Honeymoon"	December 4, 1993
12	"Safari So Good"	December 4, 1993
Mars scares his friends with campfire stories of the monstrous Cropsy, but finds that he is wrong when he meets the real Cropsy. Sebastian gets mixed up in the problems of a newlywed couple staying at his hotel. Norman's Aunt Mindy pays a visit and takes an immediate liking to Mars.
13	"Royal Foil"	December 11, 1993
13	"StC: Flambe, Bombe"	December 11, 1993
13	"Jungle Fever"	December 11, 1993
Mars and Maurice vacation in London, where Norman tricks them into helping him steal the crown jewels. Superstar Sebastian rushes through New York trying to get to the Mervin Peevish center in time to host a variety show, and avoiding getting caught by Chef Louie. Note: Originally a host sequence in "Raw Toonage". Mars tries to cure a sick Maurice, but keeps getting sneezed into the way of a refined lion named Leonardo.

== Home media ==
These episodes were only released on magnetic formats in the 1990s. Since 1999, these releases went out-of-print and became scarce and difficult to find.

=== NTSC releases ===
Three VHS and Betamax compilations, each containing five Marsupilami shorts, were released in North America by Walt Disney Home Video.

Home video title	Episode(s)	Release date
"Marsuper-Duper"	"Mars Meets Dr. Normanstein" "Hole in Mars" "Witch Doctor is Which?" "Safari So Good" "Steamboat Mars"	March 18, 1995
"Adventurous Tails"	"Bathtime for Maurice" "Hey, Hey! They're the Monkeys!" "Fear of Kites" "Toucan Always Get What You Want" "Mar-Soup-Du-Jour"	March 18, 1995
"Jumpin' Jungle Jive"	"The Hairy Ape" "Working Class Mars" "Cropsy-Turvy" "Mars' Problem Pachyderm" "Normzan of the Jungle"	March 18, 1995

=== PAL releases ===
Five VHS and Betamax cassettes collecting the entire production of Marsupilami shorts produced by Disney, were released in Europe, Australia and New Zealand by Walt Disney Home Video.

Home video title	Episode(s)	Release date
"Houba, Houba!"	"The Treasure of the Sierra Marsdre" "The Puck Stops Here" "The Hairy Ape" "Mars Meets Doctor Normanstein" "Witch Doctor is Which?" "Hot Spots" "Jungle Fever"	April 1, 1993
"The Superstar"	"The Fear of Kites" "Safari So Good" "Mars vs. Man" "Someone's in the Kitchen with Mars" "Wanna Be Ruler" "Prime Mates Forever" "The Young and the Nestless"	April 1, 1993
"Jumpin' Jungle Jive"	"The Wizard of Mars" "Working Class Mars" "Cropsy-Turvy" "Mars' Problem Pachyderm" "Normzan of the Jungle"	November 26, 1993
"Adventurous Tails"	"Royal Foil" "Hey, Hey! They're the Monkeys" "Toucan Always Get What You Want" "Mar-Soup-Du-Jour" "Bathtime for Maurice"	November 26, 1993
"Marsuper-Duper"	"Hole in Mars" "Thorn o' Plenty" "A Spotless Record" "Steamboat Mars" "Romancing the Clone"	November 26, 1993
