= The Adventures of Hyperman =

The Adventures of Hyperman may refer to:

- The Adventures of Hyperman (video game), a 1995 video game
- The Adventures of Hyperman (TV series), a 1995 TV series based on the game
