= Mad Jack the Pirate =

- Genre: Comedy; Adventure; Fantasy
- Created by: Bill Kopp
- Written by: Bill Kopp; Martin Olson; Steve Ochs
- Directed by: Jeff DeGrandis
- Starring: Bill Kopp; Billy West; Jess Harnell; Tom Kenny; Brad Garrett; Cam Clarke; Sandy Fox; Charlie Adler; Jocelyn Blue; Sherman Howard; Joyce Lang; Kevin Meaney; Steve Ochs; Valery Pappas; Jay Robinson; April Winchell
- Composers: Shuki Levy; Kussa Mahchi
- Country of origin: United States
- No. of seasons: 1
- No. of episodes: 13 (20 segments) (list of episodes)

Production
- Executive producers: Bill Kopp; Eric S. Rollman
- Producer: Jeff DeGrandis
- Production company: Saban Entertainment

Original release
- Network: Fox Kids
- Release: September 12, 1998 – February 27, 1999

Mad Jack the Pirate is an American animated comedy-adventure television series. The show was created by Bill Kopp and directed by Jeff DeGrandis (who previously worked together on The Shnookums & Meat Funny Cartoon Show and Toonsylvania). On American television, the show was broadcast on Fox Kids from September 12, 1998 to February 27, 1999.

The show is about the rather unsuccessful and quite cowardly Pirate Jack (voiced by Bill Kopp), who despite his repeated failures never doubts his own excellence, and his dim-witted anthropomorphic rat sidekick Snuk (voiced by Billy West) as they sail the seas on their ship the Sea Chicken.

Ownership of the series passed to Disney in 2001 when Disney acquired Fox Kids Worldwide, which also includes Saban Entertainment.

== Cast ==
- Bill Kopp as Mad Jack
- Billy West as Snuk
- Jess Harnell as Flash Dashing, Deity, Sterrol Flynn, Skeleton, Landlord of The Rabid Weasel, Baron Stevie Ray von Ribbentrop, Gnome #1, Stuey, Tribal Chief, Peter Lawford, Giant, Mummy, Police Officer #2
- Robert Pike Daniel as Angus Dagnabbit
- Tom Kenny as Sir Percy, Waiter, French Resort manager, Wooden Stakes Merchant, Vulgarian citizen, Crab King, Snow Sultan, Town Messenger, Uncle Mortimer's Attorney, Tribal Member
- Charlie Adler as Mrs. Grunion
- Cam Clarke as Sternly Ed Nerwood, Tolouse, Gnome #2, Arturo Caliente
- Sandy Fox as Magic Pink Fairy
- Brad Garrett as Darsh the Dragon, Biclops, Frank Sinatra
- Kevin Meaney as Chuck the Imitation Crab
- Valery Pappas as Witch
- Jocelyn Blue as Additional Voices
- Sherman Howard as Additional Voices
- Joyce Lang as Additional Voices
- Steve Ochs as Additional Voices
- Jay Robinson as Additional Voices
- April Winchell as Princess, Check-inn Lady, The Enchantress Victoria's Guard

== Episodes ==
Every episode was directed by Jeff DeGrandis.

No.	Title	Written by	Original release date
1	"The Terrifying Sea Witch Incident"	Bill Kopp	September 12, 1998
After another glorious failure of a treasure quest, Jack embarks on another one to the island of the Three Witches. Jack is imprisoned by the witches and meets his cell mate Snuk. Jack escapes with Snuk to avoid marrying the lake monster, resulting in yet another missed gain.
2	"The Curse of the Blue Karbunkle"	Bill Kopp	September 19, 1998
Jack uses Sternly Ed Nerdwood to find the Blue Karbunkle, but he ends up shattering it. The deity sends Jack and Snuk to get a key from the Isle of the Biclops to access the Singeing Sword on the Isle of the Locked Door to slay the dragon on the Isle of the Fearsome Dragon to get the gem.
3a	"Of Zerzin, Fleebis, Queues and Cures"	Bill Kopp	September 26, 1998
Jack is ill from Fleebis. He goes on a quest to the isle of Zerzin to find the Beaten Boppen Boapen Berries, before Mr. Death (who is a caricature of Sammy Davis Jr.) can claim him. Jack barely gets cured in time and inflicts death on Mr. Death himself.
3b	"A Knight to Dismember"	Bill Kopp	September 26, 1998
Jack reluctantly gives Sir Pansalot passage across the sea to the Isle of Happe to rescue his beloved Princess from the black knight Sir Percy. Jack is forced to fight Sir Percy for Sir Pansalot.
4a	"The Strange Case of Angus Dagnabbit!"	Bill Kopp	October 3, 1998
Angus catches Jack trying to steal his Golden Haggis. Jack challenges Angus to get it and simply fires him out of a cannon. Angus' ghost comes to reclaim the golden haggis. After too much haunting, Jack finally gives it back.
4b	"Lights, Camera — Snuk!"	Bill Kopp	October 3, 1998
After seeing a movie, Jack decides to teach the film director at Megamouth Studios what piracy really is. The grumpy director Boiling Point fires Sterrol Flynn (a reference to Errol Flynn) and hires Jack and Snuk. In every clip Jack gets injured, often being eaten by a dinosaur. As a result, Snuk becomes a movie star.
5a	"Happy Birthday to Who?"	Bill Kopp	October 24, 1998
Snuk takes Jack to the last place he wants to go for his birthday: The Animal Funfair. Every ride and service proves to a shambles for Jack but exciting for Snuk. Jack makes the Scuffy Skunk robot insane, which causes Scuffy to abduct him. Snuk rides a plane, rescues Jack, destroys Scuffy and crash lands. However, at the end, it is revealed that Scuffy survived and he follows Jack and Snuk by boat.
5b	"Shipwhacked"	Story by : Bill Kopp; Teleplay by : Martin Olson	October 24, 1998
Snuk's blunder results in Jack and Snuk washed ashore on an island. Jack has a hard time surviving on the island, but Snuk takes it coolly and has much better luck than Jack. Eventually they find a posh hotel resort, but it turns out to be a lot worse than what they've been through.
6	"The Horror of Draclia"	Bill Kopp	October 31, 1998
Jack and Snuk go on a quest for Count Draclia's castle for the golden wand. But Draclia has been expecting them. In attempt to steal the treasure box, Draclia zombifies Snuk and captures Jack. Jack manages to snap Snuk out of it and Snuk defeats Draclia, but not for long.
7a	"The Treasure of the Headless, Left-Handed, Peatmoss Salesman"	Martin Olson	November 7, 1998
Jack and Snuk get arrested by the police before they can begin their treasure quest. They are sentenced to the DMMV, in which Flash is their driving instructor. Jack fails the tormenting test and goes for the Ninny Class instead.
7b	"999 Delights"	Steve Ochs	November 7, 1998
Jack goes to the D&D Wizards and Warriors Convention and steals a magic wand so he go on a quest to find the Enchantress Victoria in the Castle of 999 Delights. Once inside the castle, Jack discovers that Victoria is a devil lady who then performs 999 delightful tortures on Jack.
8a	"The Alarming Snow Troll Encounter"	Bill Kopp	November 14, 1998
Jack and Snuk are crossing the frozen plains, when snow trolls attack and steal their ice-cream maker. After a visit to the Snow Sultan, Jack and Snuk go to find the trolls, only to be captured by them. Jack tricks them into lighting a barbecue and brings the ice-cream maker back to the palace.
8b	"The Case of the Crabs"	Bill Kopp	November 14, 1998
Jack and Snuk dive in a submarine to find the pink pearl in the kingdom of Crustacia. Things go horribly wrong when they walk the seabed and they are taken prisoner by the Crustacians. They meet the imitation crab Chuck. They are taken to be eaten by a giant clam. They all escape, but Jack fails to get the pink pearl.
9a	"Jack the Dragon Slayer"	Bill Kopp	December 12, 1998
Jack goes on a quest to rescue Princess Penelope from the dragon Darsh for a reward. Darsh is pretty dense for Jack since he listens to the Princess a lot and they both love each other. Because of this Jack cancels his quest and manages to save his skin from an unpaid debt.
9b	"Captain Snuk"	Steve Ochs	December 12, 1998
Jack receives a threatening letter from Jean Claude, an old enemy of his. In order to avoid trouble Jack and Snuk impersonate each other. Jean tells Snuk his story and repeatedly abuses Jack. Before Snuk can executed, Jack literally blows his cover via sneezing. After Jack has a small talk, Jean departs.
10a	"The Island of Pink and Fuzzy"	Bill Kopp	February 6, 1999
Jack and Snuk head to the Island of Pink and Fuzzy in search of treasure. They reach the Fortress of Ultimate Cutness with a poodle Tolouse. Finally they manage to bypass the vicious Ted the Bear and get the treasure. However, unbeknownst to them, the treasure is cursed.
10b	"Uncle Mortimer"	Steve Ochs	February 6, 1999
Jack inherits a fortune from his deceased Uncle Mortimer with the requirement to deliver his corpse and his dog Scabby Doo to the Isle of Hanna Barbarians. However, Mortimer's ghost haunts Jack and Snuk on the ship, trying to kill them with the axe. When they reach the island, they find out that Mortimer's butler Stuey was disguised as Mortimer's ghost all along in order to get the treasure for himself. Much to Jack's disappointment, the treasure is dog biscuits. Note: This episode's plot is a reference to Hanna-Barbera.
11a	"The Great Kapow!"	Bill Kopp	February 13, 1999
While Jack and Snuk are starving at sea, an island tribe is having trouble feeding the Great Kapow. Before Jack can eat Snuk, they reach the island. The tribe treat Jack and Snuk to delicious food but are fattening them up for Kapow. When Snuk is thrown to Kapow, he discovers that Kapow is actually a man (who strongly resembles Elvis Presley) operating a machine to scare the tribe into feeding him. In the end Snuk puts everyone on a diet.
11b	"The Snuk, the Mad and the Ugly"	Steve Ochs	February 13, 1999
Jack plans to get rich by setting Snuk up, but is also imprisoned. Their cell mate Arturo tells them a treasure location. Jack and Snuk escape and head for Cheerful Valley. After crossing the desert and much digging, Jack and Snuk find the treasure, but Arturo reclaims it. Prior to that and afterwards, Jack and Snuk have a mirage involving The Rat Pack.
12a	"Attack of the Man-Eating, Green Gorillas"	Bill Kopp	February 20, 1999
Jack finds treasure in a Mesoamerican pyramid when he is abducted by Flash and his buccaneer crew. Snuk recalls the days Flash repeatedly got Jack into trouble in elementary school. Their old teacher, Mrs. Grunion, appears in the sea and only Snuk answers her previous question correctly, but loses the treasure. Instead, he gets an A (much to Jack's chagrin).
12b	"The Johnny of the Lamp"	Bill Kopp	February 20, 1999
Jack has procured a magic lamp only to lose it to a sea monster. Angus Dagnabbit is the only one up to the job of catching the sea monster. After failing to catch the sea monster twice, all three get swallowed by it. They use the lamp and get sent into the lamp where they meet the Johnny.
13a	"Mad Jack and the Beanstalk"	Bill Kopp	February 27, 1999
Snuk loses money Jack gave him to a conman and is left with beans tied to string. Jack throws the beans in the sea, resulting in a giant bean stalk growing. Jack and Snuk try to find treasure in a castle while avoiding the giant. After getting a giant coin, they all fall through the clouds giving the landlord his rent for the Sea Chicken.
13b	"The Curse of the Mummy's Toe"	Bill Kopp	February 27, 1999
Jack is on a hunt for the legendary Mummy's Toe and gets hold of a decipher ring. In the pyramid, Jack and Snuk find a treasure room, meeting the imitation crab Chuck. Jack picks up the toe, only to trigger a collapse, and the trio meet the mummy. After losing the mummy, the trio are arrested for theft.

== Reception ==
Critics have noted that the clear inspiration for the show is the 1983–1989 BBC comedy series Blackadder. Jack bears a striking resemblance to Edmund Blackadder and Snuk to Baldrick. There is even some dialogue taken straight from the BBC series. Jack's archenemy Flash resembles Blackadder's Lord Flashheart, and Angus is almost identical to Blackadder's Lord Angus.

== Broadcast and home media ==
The series has been released on DVD in Romania (as Piratul Jack cel Teribil) and Bulgaria (as Пиратът Капитан Джак) and on VCD in Turkey (under the title Çılgın Korsan Jack). Also in Turkey, the cartoon was shown on Jetix Play and in Poland on Fox Kids.
