= Toonsylvania (video game) =

2000 video game

- Developer: RFX Interactive
- Publishers: Ubi Soft; Light & Shadow Production
- Platform: Game Boy Color
- Release: June 2000

Toonsylvania is a 2000 video game developed by RFX Interactive and published by Ubi Soft for the Game Boy Color. It is based on the Toonsylvania television series.

== Gameplay ==
Toonsylvania is a side‑scrolling platform game in which players control Igor, the laboratory assistant to Dr. Vic Frankenstein. The central objective is to recover the scattered body parts of Igor's friend Phil after an accident causes him to be blown apart. Progression through the game involves exploring individual levels and collecting components of inventions that allow access to new areas. Across the game, Igor traverses environments such as graveyards, crypts, swamps, and supernatural corridors. Collected items are used to assemble devices like a diving suit or a propeller helmet, which enable movement through hazards or previously inaccessible sections of each stage. Levels are populated with enemies and environmental obstacles, requiring players to jump, avoid danger, and reach the end of each area to continue.

== Development ==
Toonsylvania was announced in March 2000 for a Summer 2000 release.

== Reception ==
Reception

Review scores
Publication	Score
All Game Guide	2/5
GameSpot	4.6/10
IGN	4/10
Jeuxvideo	14/20

GameSpot said "Unless you're a rabid fan of the cartoon series, the tedium involved easily overshadows anything the game might have going for it".

Los Angeles Times said "Toonslyvania” is simple and derivative, but it takes care to cover the basics".
