= List of Dorothy and the Wizard of Oz episodes =

The following is a list of episodes from the series Dorothy and the Wizard of Oz.

== Series overview ==
Season	Episodes	Originally released	
Season	Episodes	First released	Last released
1	20	June 29, 2017	April 12, 2018
2	26	May 24, 2018	November 15, 2019
3	13	July 6, 2020	July 31, 2020

== Episodes ==
=== Season 1 (2017–18) ===
No. overall	No. in season	Title	Directed by	Written by	Original release date	Prod. code
1a	1a	"Beware the Woozy"	Jeff DeGrandis	Jack Ferraiolo	June 29, 2017	101 (FC)
Ozma becomes a statue after Dorothy spritzes her with the Perfume of Petrification. The ingredients for the antidote consist of a six leaf clover, bark from a fighting tree, a daisy from Munchkinland and three hairs from a Woozy's tail. As a result, Ozma's petrification causes the Nome King to take advantage of this.
1b	1b	"Magical Mandolin"	Jeff DeGrandis and Kuni Tomita	Jack Ferraiolo	June 29, 2017	102 (FC)
Wilhelmina steals the Magical Mandolin that causes anyone who hears it to dance during the day and puts them in a trance at night.
2a	2a	"Toto Unleashed"	Kuni Tomita	Rachel Lipman	June 29, 2017	103 (FC)
Wilhelmina dognaps Toto when Dorothy ignores him.
2b	2b	"Official Ozian Exam"	Kuni Tomita	Madellaine Paxson	June 29, 2017	104 (FC)
Dorothy has to take an exam in order to stay in the Land of Oz.
3a	3a	"Locket Locket in My Pocket"	Jeff DeGrandis	Jack Ferraiolo	June 29, 2017	105 (FC)
Wilhelmina disguises herself as Dorothy in order to steal the ruby slippers.
3b	3b	"Mixed-Up Mixer"	Kuni Tomita	Noelle Wright	June 29, 2017	106 (FC)
Dorothy tries to stop a magical mixer from mixing up all of Oz.
4a	4a	"Ojo the Unlucky"	Kuni Tomita	Michelle Jabloner-Weiss	June 29, 2017	107 (FC)
Dorothy, Lion, Scarecrow, and Tin Man help out a Munchkin with bad luck named Ojo. While they use a magic carpet to cross the Deadly Desert to get to the Fountain of Refresh in the Land of Ev, they are captured by Nome King's forces.
4b	4b	"Lion's Share"	Charles Visser	Catherine Lieuwen	June 29, 2017	108 (FC)
Upon being summoned to the forest to be crowned king, a reluctant Lion is aided by Dorothy, Scarecrow, Tin Man, and the Lion's friend Hungry Tiger to overcome different obstacles along the way. Soon, the Lion tries to summon his courage when Dorothy is in danger.
5a	5a	"Rules of Attraction"	Charles Visser	Charlotte Fullerton and Ed Valentine	June 29, 2017	109 (FC)
When given a Love Magnet from Ozma as a Valentine's Day present, Dorothy sees how much things can get out of control.
5b	5b	"Brain Power of Love"	Charles Visser	Kim Duran	June 29, 2017	110 (FC)
Everyone believes that Scarecrow has fallen in love with Patchwork Girl.
6a	6a	"Jinxed"	Jeff DeGrandis	Tom Pugsley	June 29, 2017	111 (FC)
Dorothy and Ozma have lost their voices.
6b	6b	"Rise of the Nome King"	Kuni Tomita	Brad Birch	June 29, 2017	112 (FC)
The Nome King tries to take over Oz after playing a nasty trick on Dorothy and stealing the magic magnifying glass.
7a	7a	"One-Winged Wally"	Charles Visser	Tiffany Lo and Ethel Lung	June 29, 2017	113 (FC)
Following an encounter with the Wheelers led by Crank, Dorothy meets a winged monkey named Wally. Unfortunately, he only has one wing and can only fly crooked. So Dorothy and her pals try to help him with the help of Queen Ozma and Dr. Pipt.
7b	7b	"Wand-erful"	Kexx Singleton, Kuni Tomita and Charles Visser	Shea Fontana	September 6, 2017	114 (FC)
Glinda's magic wand is missing at the time when Dorothy was teaching Toto how to fetch and a storm is coming to the Emerald City, and the gang needs to find it before Wilhelmina does.
8a	8a	"No Sleep Sleepover"	Kuni Tomita	Michelle Jabloner-Weiss	September 6, 2017	115 (FC)
At the suggestion of her aunt's ghost upon being uninvited, Wilhelmina crashes Dorothy's sleepover party with a giant monster called the Pillow Man, who is made out of pillows. When the Pillow Man captures both Dorothy & Wilhelmina, Tin Man, Scarecrow, Toto, Lion and Patchwork Girl must work together to defeat it. Dorothy invites Wilhelmina to the sleepover.
8b	8b	"Lion Catches a Bug"	Kexx Singleton	Taylor Cox and Jacquie Walters	September 6, 2017	116 (FC)
Lion gets sick at the time when Wilhelmina's flying monkeys can threaten the forest. Using a potion given to them by Ozma, Dorothy, Scarecrow and Tin Man head into Lion in order to fight the bug in him.
9a	9a	"Tik Tok and Tin Man"	Kuni Tomita	Story by : Rachel Lipman; Teleplay by : Roger Eschbacher	December 21, 2017	117 (FC)
After the group is attacked by Lightning Bugs, Tin Man meets someone who is just like him in the form of Smith & Tinker's creation Tik-Tok who has to keep being wound up. To get the special springs for Tik Tok, Dorothy takes Scarecrow, Tin Man, Lion and Tik-Tok to Spring Field Mountain to pick out the special springs.
9b	9b	"If I Only Had Some Brawn"	Charles Visser	Ed Valentine	December 21, 2017	118 (FC)
During the first Corn Maze Contest where the winner will get to rule the Land of Oz for a day, Scarecrow wants to look buff so that he can impress Patchwork Girl after Lion stops her vehicle. While getting the jelly bits for the Ruler for a Day Crown from Dr. Pipt, Scarecrow receives the Supersizer Musclizer from Dr. Pipt who informs him of a side-effects of the loss of his intelligence. Meanwhile, Kaliko informs Nome King of the contest and takes advantage of it.
10a	10a	"The Beast Royales"	Kuni Tomita	Len Uhley	December 21, 2017	119 (FC)
A famous animal band called the Beast Royales (consisting of Lenny the Lion, Tig the Tiger, and Barry the Bear) has come to perform in Emerald City on Tuneful Tuesday. Upon being informed about the event by Frank and Lyman, Wilhelmina plans to have the Beast Royales perform a private concert for her instead.
10b	10b	"Time After Time"	Kexx Singleton	Roger Eschbacher and Hugh Webber	December 21, 2017	120 (FC)
As everyone in the Land of Oz gets ready for bedtime, the Wicked Witch of the West demands that Wilhelmina gets her the Ruby Slippers. Wilhelmina tries to steal the ruby slippers while Dorothy is asleep at Frank's suggestion. After Toto thwarts the first attempt, Wilhelmina uses the Magic Hourglass to go back in time enough to steal the Ruby Slippers
11a	11a	"Kitten Around"	Kexx Singleton	Shea Fontana	December 21, 2017	121 (FC)
When a Rak is attacking Purrville in the Valley of the Pussycats, a cat named Eureka finds her way to the Cowardly Lion who was sparring with a Fighting Tree. With help from Dorothy, Scarecrow, Tin Man, and Cowardly Lion, Eureka and the residence of Purrville into getting rid of the Rak.
11b	11b	"Castle Sitters"	Kexx Singleton	Madellaine Paxson	December 21, 2017	122 (FC)
While Glinda and Dorothy are away at Witchy Bazaar #9, Lion, Tin Man, and Scarecrow must stop Frank and Lyman from stealing "The Great Book of Records" so that Wilhelmina can remove Dorothy's history of her arrival from it after her visit to Witchy Bazaar #9.
12a	12a	"Stuck on You"	Charles Visser	Taylor Cox and Jacquie Walters	December 21, 2017	123 (FC)
A Best Friend's Necklace has Dorothy and Ozma conjoined at the hip at the time when they are having a tea party. At the advice of Glinda, they must work to find the Key to Friendship at Key's Whereabout to get unstuck. Wilhelmina sends Frank and Lyman to find the key first so that they can keep Dorothy and Ozma stuck together forever.
12b	12b	"Family Matters"	Kuni Tomita	Noelle Wright	December 21, 2017	124 (FC)
While getting a cake from the Lollipop Guild's Bakery for Ozma on Family Day, Dorothy and her friends try to help Woozy get his own family. While they work to find other creatures in Woozy's category, Dorothy must work to keep him from getting sad enough to flood Munchkinland's Family Day event.
13a	13a	"The Emerald of Zog"	Kexx Singleton	Story by : Nina Bargiel; Teleplay by : Nina Bargiel and John N. Huss	December 21, 2017	125 (FC)
Dorothy and her friends must retrieve a jewel to appease Gary the Jewel Mule, but they aren't having much success when they encounter a sea monster named Zog and soon receive help from a feisty Australian-accented mermaid named Merla.
13b	13b	"Cooking Up Some Magic"	Kexx Singleton	Michelle Jabloner-Weiss	December 21, 2017	126 (FC)
After Scarecrow accidentally breaks the Lollipop Guild's cookie-making machine for the Munchkin Cookie Jamboree, Dorothy accidentally bakes walking talking gingerbread men with Ozma's magic cookie cutter.
14a	14a	"Copy Cat"	Kexx Singleton	Tiffany Lo and Ethel Lung	December 21, 2017	127 (FC)
During the picnic near the Truth Pond, Queen Ozma shows Dorothy an artifact called the Copy Cat that can clone anything. Following her aunt’s advice, Wilhelmina sends Frank and Lyman to steal the Copy Cat so that she can clone an army of flying monkeys to conquer the Land of Oz. Once she gets the Copy Cat, Wilhelmina clones herself instead to target the Ruby Slippers which goes comically awry.
14b	14b	"Snow Place Like Home"	Kuni Tomita	Story by : Nina Bargiel; Teleplay by : Nina Bargiel and Hugh Webber	November 30, 2017	128 (FC)
While looking at clouds, Dorothy tells Scarecrow, Tin Man, Lion and Queen Ozma about snow. With help from Ozma and a magical snow globe, Dorothy introduces her pals to snow where she starts the first Snow Day. Wilhelmina is displeased with Dorothy getting credit for a snow day and plans to steal the magical snow globe so that she can bury the Emerald City in winter.
15a	15a	"Mirror Madness"	Charles Visser	Madellaine Paxson	December 21, 2017	129 (FC)
Queen Ozma finds that her magic mirror has been stolen by Frank and Lyman. When Wilhelmina touches it, she starts to have her reflection changed into a more hideous state. Frank and Lyman have no choice but to ask Dorothy to help get Wilhelmina back to normal. Though an accident with a banana peel frees Wilhelmina's monstrous reflection beast. Dorothy tells Wilhelmina to defeat the reflection beast by doing good deeds that it won't deflect.
15b	15b	"Everything Coming Up Poppies"	Kuni Tomita	Story by : Roger Eschbacher; Teleplay by : Roger Eschbacher and Hugh Webber	December 21, 2017	130 (FC)
Queen Ozma establishes the first ever Poppin Poppies Parade. Dorothy, Scarecrow, Tin Man, and Lion look for poppies to decorate the Queen Ozma float where Lion accidentally picks sleep poppies from the Wicked Witch's forbidden field. Noticing this while establishing their floats, Wilhelmina tells her aunt about this discovery as she comes up with a plan for Wilhelmina to obtain the Ruby Slippers this way.
16a	16a	"A Cut Above the Rest"	Charles Visser	Story by : Jeremy Adams; Teleplay by : Jeremy Adams and Hugh Webber	April 12, 2018	131 (FC)
Patchwork Girl gives Dorothy a special gown for the Royal Ball of Oz that is in honor of Dorothy and attended by all of the Land of Oz's royalties like King Glum of Merryland, Prince Puzzleton of Fuddlecumjig, Baroness Bunchausen of Bunburry, and Duchess Doofus of the Isle of Dofi. This Magic Princess Dress will help Dorothy do things that are associated with the Royal Ball of Oz. Meanwhile, Frank and Lyman steal Ozma's Ozian Chaos Stones in order for Wilhelmina to have Dorothy unknowingly ruin it.
16b	16b	"Abraca-Oops"	Kuni Tomita	Jack Ferraiolo	April 12, 2018	132 (FC)
When Ozma loses her magic until sundown upon Dorothy quoting "Abra-Kadabra" which is an anti-magic word, she and her pals try to help her win a magic contest hosted by Glinda, the Mayor of Munchkinland, and Patchwork Girl with the prize being the Wishing Stone. Wilhelmina is among the contestants as she plans to get the Wishing Stone.
17a	17a	"Halloween Heist"	Kexx Singleton	Noelle Wright	October 2, 2017	133 (FC)
Dorothy tells her friends about Halloween like pretending to be monsters, putting up Halloween decorations, and going trick-or-treating, but none of them are convinced. Queen Ozma decides to start the first ever Oz Halloween Party. Wilhelmina thinks this sounds like the perfect holiday and plans to crash the Oz Halloween party. She creates Jack Pumpkinhead with a combination of a jack-o'-lantern and the Potion of Life to help her, Frank and Lyman in ruining the Oz Halloween Party.
17b	17b	"Haunt Me Not"	Kexx Singleton	Shea Fontana	October 2, 2017	134 (FC)
On Halloween night, Dorothy, Toto, Scarecrow, Tin Man, Lion and Jack Pumpkinhead are trick-or-treating where they run into the Mayor of Munchkinland, Woozy, Patchwork Girl, Queen Ozma, Larry Chigglewitz, and the Lollypop Guild. When they come to the end of the Yellow Brick Road, Dorothy and Jack convince the others to follow the Red Brick Road instead. Their journey leads them to a haunted house where they encounter Candy Man from the Valley of Bonbons.
18a	18a	"Wheelers of Fortune"	Kuni Tomita	Shea Fontana	April 12, 2018	135 (FC)
Dorothy, Scarecrow, Tin Man, and Lion try to figure out who stole some of the Yellow bricks from the Yellow Brick Road which halts the Munchkins' Cotton Candy Caravan. They find clues that the Wheelers were there. When they visit the Wheelers in their junkyard, Dorothy learns from the Wheeler Crank that the theft has affected the upcoming Wheeler 500 as they encounter a broken-wheeled Wheeler named Rustle.
18b	18b	"Sister Sister"	Charles Visser	Taylor Cox and Jacquie Walters	April 12, 2018	136 (FC)
There is an upcoming celebration for Glinda coming up where everyone in the Land of Oz will be in attendance. Glinda's twin sister Melinda the Mean is accidentally invited and tries to ruin her sister's reputation in Munchkinland by posing as her. Melinda's lizard sidekick Sassy lures the real Glinda into a dragon's cave while posing as a Munchkin. Now Dorothy and her friends must find Glinda and get her back to Munchkinland before Melinda causes more trouble.
19a	19a	"Moody Magic"	Kuni Tomita	Michele Jabloner-Weiss	April 12, 2018	137 (FC)
Dorothy and the Ozian Gang are in China Country helping the Hungry Tiger get some scones and are in for the shock of their lives! Dorothy's moods are being controlled by Wilhelmina's mood ring on Dorothy's finger, resulting in the Hungry Tiger nearly destroying China Country.
19b	19b	"If the Shoe Fits"	Charles Visser	Shea Fontana	April 12, 2018	138 (FC)
Dorothy's group work with Frank and Lyman to rescue Wilhelmina and the stolen Ruby Slipper from Under the Rainbow and return to the Land of Oz.
20a	20a	"Get Smart"	Kexx Singleton	Dave Polsky	April 12, 2018	139 (FC)
After Kaliko obtains a copy of the Great Rulers of Oz book written by Woggle-Bug, the Nome King finds that he is not in the book and has Woggle-Bug abducted to have him be put in the book. To be a great ruler of the Land of Oz, the Nome King gets a very clever plan to take over Oz by stealing Queen Ozma's wand during her meeting with the Oz Leaders Council.
20b	20b	"Mission Imp-Possible"	Kexx Singleton	Story by : Ed Valentine; Teleplay by : Hugh Webber	April 12, 2018	140 (FC)
Wilhelmina obtains a "grow your own imp" set that enables her to grow three little chaos-causing imps named Ullie, Bob, and Ollie to cause trouble for Dorothy while firing Frank and Lyman. Dorothy and her friends head to Emerald Mountain to try to cure the hiccups of a snow monster called Zoup where it was claimed that Queen Ozma placed a hiccup curse on him. This enables to Wilhelmina to take a chance to harm Dorothy by sending Ullie, Bob, and Ollie to prank them so that the Zoup can destroy the Emerald City and take revenge on Queen Ozma.

=== Season 2 (2018–19) ===
The series was picked up for a second season, which started airing on the Boomerang Streaming Service on May 24, 2018.

No. overall	No. in season	Title	Directed by	Written by	Original release date	Prod. code
21–22	1–2	"The Wizard, The Witch and the Crystal Ball"	Kuni Tomita (Part 1); Charles Visser (Part 2); Kexx Singleton (Part 3-4)	Brad Birch	May 24, 2018	141-144 (FC)
Dorothy and the gang are shocked to find out the Wicked Witch of the West's ghost is trapped in her crystal ball. Meanwhile, the Wizard of Oz makes a dubious return to Oz. When he discovers the Wicked Witch is still alive, he pays her visit to strike an unsetting deal that will spell for trouble for Dorothy and the gang. Dorothy and her friends are sucked into the Wicked Witch's crystal ball where they will spend eternity unless Dorothy makes a tough decision and a sacrifice. Having found a way of out the Wicked Witch's crystal ball, Dorothy and the gang discover the Wicked Witch escaped as well and is possessing the body of the Wizard. When she returns, the Wicked Witch realizes in horror she had lost her powers to the Wizard. Note: The four episodes/parts got their own separate names: The Wizard Returns (Part 1); The Wizard Pays a Visit (Part 2); Escape from the Crystal Ball (Part 3); The Return of the Wicked Witch (Part 4)
23a	3a	"Three Friends and a Magic Crystal"	Kexx Singleton	Kevin Hopps	October 24, 2018	145 (FC)
During the autumn, while Dorothy was raking the leaves, and Wilhelmina tried another failed attempt to steal Dorothy's Ruby Slippers again, they both get stuck in a magic cocoon of leaves.
23b	3b	"Toto Transformed"	Kexx Singleton	Brad Birch	November 29, 2018	146 (FC)
A new bell on Toto's collar causes him to change into a giant monster called the Ozsquash.
24a	4a	"Scarecrow Knows Best"	Kuni Tomita	Jim Martin	November 29, 2018	147 (FC)
Scarecrow struggles to think of a way to build a Yellow brick bridge over a river.
24b	4b	"General Jinjur"	Charles Visser	Luke Giordano	November 29, 2018	148 (FC)
Dorothy gets kidnapped by General Jinjur and her all-female army.
25a	5a	"Where-Helmina's My Broom?!"	Kuni Tomita	Tiffany Lo & Ethel Lung	November 29, 2018	149 (FC)
Wilhelmina's broom is missing and she tries to find it.
25b	5b	"Yellow Brick Road Race"	Kuni Tomita	John N. Huss	November 29, 2018	150 (FC)
Dorothy and her friends race the Wheelers over ownership of the Yellow Brick Road. Dorothy wins and Crank loses, and Dorothy decides the Yellow Brick Road belongs to everyone, and says the moral is "Slow and steady wins the race."
26a	6a	"Don't Follow the Yellow Brick Road"	Charles Visser	Kevin Hopps	November 29, 2018	151 (FC)
When Dorothy and her friends decide to take on a road less traveled, the Nome King disguises himself as Queen Ozma to move the Emerald City into his kingdom under the ground.
26b	6b	"The Tallest Munchkin"	Charles Visser	Jim Martin	November 29, 2018	152 (FC)
Dorothy and friends help a Munchkin named Devon who is the tallest Munchkin in Munchkinland.
27a	7a	"Scarecrow Goes to College"	Kexx Singleton	Tiffany Lo & Ethel Lung	November 29, 2018	153 (FC)
When Scarecrow decides to attend Wogglebug College, the Wicked Witch disguises herself as Scarecrow in another failed attempt to gain Dorothy's ruby slippers.
27b	7b	"Welcome to Oz Mitch"	Kexx Singleton	Marty Abbe-Schneider	November 29, 2018	154 (FC)
A storm brings a Kansas boy named Mitch to the land of Oz. Dorothy and her friends show him around.
28a	8a	"Wheeling Tin Man"	Kuni Tomita	John N. Huss	November 29, 2018	155 (FC)
After helping a Wheeler with a broken wheel, the Wheelers invite the Tin Man to do their dangerous activities with them.
28b	8b	"Home Away from Home"	Kuni Tomita	Allen Glazier	November 29, 2018	156 (FC)
Scarecrow, Tin Man, and Cowardly Lion seek the Wizard of Oz's help when Dorothy's feeling homesick.
29a	9a	"The Vault Heist"	Charles Visser	Luke Giordano	November 29, 2018	157 (FC)
Dorothy struggles to keep track of everything while Queen Ozma is attending a meeting of all Oz dignitaries.
29b	9b	"Witch One's the Boss?!"	Charles Visser	Jim Martin	November 29, 2018	158 (FC)
Dorothy and her friends decide to help the Wizard of Oz master his powers. Meanwhile, the Wicked Witch does things for Wilhelmina so that she'll teach her how to be a witch again.
30a	10a	"Wingmen No More"	Kexx Singleton	Brad Birch	November 29, 2018	159 (FC)
After botching another attempt to get the Ruby Slippers, Wilhelmina causes Frank and Lyman's wings to fly away. These wings attach themselves to Scarecrow and Lion.
30b	10b	"Hammer Time"	Kexx Singleton	Sib Ventress	November 29, 2018	160 (FC)
The Wicked Witch orders Wilhelmina to use hammerhead sharks to sabotage the opening of the new Munchkin Museum upon learning of its Good Witches' wing.
31a	11a	"Jest Kidding"	Kuni Tomita	Gene Grillo	November 29, 2018	161 (FC)
The Wicked Witch plans to use Motley the Jester's hurtful jokes in her latest scheme to get the ruby slippers. When Motley finds out about her wicked plan, he turns the tables on her, and the Wicked Witch becomes a complete laughingstock to everyone in Oz with the laughing charm stuck to her cape.
31b	11b	"Sisterhood of the Witch"	Kuni Tomita	Jim Martin	November 29, 2018	162 (FC)
The Wicked Witch's arch-nemesis Mean Geanne the Green takes over Wilhelmina's castle. So, the Wicked Witch asks for the Wizard's help to get her castle back.
32a	12a	"The Old Classic"	Charles Visser	Marty Abbe-Schneider	December 6, 2018	163 (FC)
After Wilhelmina gets hit with an anti-magic spell for three whole days by Queen Ozma, she and the Wicked Witch have Frank and Lyman infiltrate Dorothy and her friends' tea party so they can nab Dorothy's Ruby Slippers, but they end up enjoying it instead.
32b	12b	"Too Predictable"	Charles Visser	Luke Giordano	December 6, 2018	164 (FC)
Wilhelmina and the Wicked Witch plan to throw off the Wizard's predictilyzer so it won't predict what they'll do next.
33a	13a	"Oztember Surprise"	Kexx Singleton	Allen Glazier	December 6, 2018	165 (FC)
The Wicked Witch of the West disguises herself as a little girl called Westina on Oztember 1st, a day where magical people can share their powers, which takes place during November and December.
33b	13b	"Sir Hokus of Pokes"	Kexx Singleton	John N. Huss	December 6, 2018	166 (FC)
A legendary knight known as Sir Hokus of Pokes arrives in Emerald City. But Dorothy and her friends soon discover he's not as mighty as he used to be.
34a	14a	"The Nice Witch"	Brad Goodchild	Tiffany Lo & Ethel Lung	March 29, 2019	167 (FC)
Wilhelmina casts a "Say Yes" spell on the Wicked Witch for her grouchy attitude and suddenly her auntie starts to try new things she would never have agreed to before which includes befriending Dorothy and the gang.
34b	14b	"Scoodlers"	Brad Goodchild	Mimi Hess	March 29, 2019	168 (FC)
Tin Man gets captured by Scoodlers who try to use him as a stew pot.
35a	15a	"Emerald Thumb"	Charles Visser	Mimi Hess	March 29, 2019	169 (FC)
Dorothy and her friends make a garden which become monstrous after a magic mishap by the Wizard.
35b	15b	"The Witch Hunter"	Charles Visser	Luke Giordano	March 29, 2019	170 (FC)
Wilhelmina and the Wicked Witch end up getting captured by witch hunter Baron Fernando von Soozle, and they trick him into nabbing Dorothy and her Ozian friends.
36a	16a	"The Tin Giant"	Kexx Singleton	Kevin Hopps	March 29, 2019	171 (FC)
Wilhelmina gets Smith and Tinker to create a voice-activated Tin Giant which the Wicked Witch plans to use to terrorize Oz.
36b	16b	"Dorothy's Detective Agency"	Kexx Singleton	Luke Giordano	March 29, 2019	172 (FC)
Detective Dorothy opens a detective agency to try to help solve mysteries for the people of Oz. When Wilhelmina gets accused of attacking the Wizard, Dorothy is on the case, and proves Wilhelmina is innocent and the Wizard had framed her.
37a	17a	"Kingdom of Dreams"	Brad Goodchild	Story by : James W. Bates; Teleplay by : Hugh Webber	March 29, 2019	173 (FC)
Dorothy and her friends have to get Lion out of the Kingdom of Dreams in the Nonestic Ocean in order to deal a problem the woodland animals of the Emerald Forest have.
37b	17b	"Ozmosis"	Brad Goodchild	Don Gillies	March 29, 2019	174 (FC)
Dorothy and her friends are tasked with locking the Helmet of Ozmosis away in the vault of the Castle of Not-What-It-Seems. The Wicked Witch tries to steal the helmet, but backfires as the helmet possesses Lyman instead. Now, it's up to Dorothy, her friends, the Wizard, the Witches and Frank to get Lyman back to the normal and lock the Helmet away.
38a	18a	"Lion and the Crown"	Charles Visser	Allen Glazier	March 29, 2019	175 (FC)
An evil enchanted crown in on Lion's head and takes over his kingdom. Lion needs Dorothy's help to get the crown off his head and get his kingdom back.
38b	18b	"Munchkin School"	Charles Visser	Caroline Farah	March 29, 2019	176 (FC)
Dorothy decides to turn her old Kansas house into a school for Munchkins. Frank and Lyman try to sneak in in order to get smart.
39a	19a	"Welcome to the Bungle"	Kexx Singleton	David Shayne	March 29, 2019	177 (FC)
There's a mouse in the Emerald City and Dorothy and her friends try to catch it by using Bungle the Glass Cat.
39b	19b	"The Mouse that Roared"	Kexx Singleton	Rich Fogel	March 29, 2019	178 (FC)
Lion meets and develops a crush on Marie, Queen of the Field Mice who has always wanted to see the Emerald City.
40a	20a	"Special Delivery"	Brad Goodchild	Brady Klosterman	March 29, 2019	179 (FC)
Dorothy and her friends are instructed to bring Emeraldium to the Emerald City so that it can be powered. To thwart them, the Wicked Witch of the West sets up a giant blockade involving a normal giant, a giant Cyclops, and a three-eyed Giant of Tartary.
40b	20b	"Broomstormers!"	Brad Goodchild	Mimi Hess	November 15, 2019	180 (FC)
The Wicked Witch and Mean Jeanne the Green expect to finally settle their 500-year rivalry in the ultimate match-up at the annual Broomstorming Sweepstakes. But when Wilhelmina sprains her ankle, she's unable to compete, until she and her aunt have Dorothy compete for them.
41a	21a	"Prisoner Under the Rainbow"	Charles Visser	Luke Giordano	November 15, 2019	181 (FC)
The Undertaker's realm under the rainbow is cluttered.
41b	21b	"The Lost Appetite"	Charles Visser	Allen Glazier	November 15, 2019	182 (FC)
Wilhelmina transfers Hungry Tiger's appetite to Lyman.
42a	22a	"Chasing Rainbows"	Kexx Singleton	Meg Favreau	November 15, 2019	183 (FC)
The Rainbow's daughter, Polychrome, falls off the rainbow. Tin Man, who develops a crush on Polychrome, offers to help her get back to the rainbow, and so do his friends. They had to get her back before she fades away.
42b	22b	"The Wicked Wand"	Kexx Singleton	Kevin Hopps	November 15, 2019	184 (FC)
The Wicked Witch wants the Mist Monster.
43a	23a	"Ojo’s Treasure Hunt"	Brad Goodchild	Don Gillies	November 15, 2019	185 (FC)
Ojo thinks his luck has finally changed, as he goes on a treasure hunt adventure. The witches want to have the treasure for themselves, so it was up to Dorothy and her Ozian friends to help Ojo get to the treasure first.
43b	23b	"Return of Pumpkinhead"	Brad Goodchild	Luke Giordano	November 15, 2019	186 (FC)
Jack Pumpkinhead has the Wizard change his head.
44	24	"Dorothy's Christmas in Oz"	Charles Visser	Brad Birch	December 29, 2018	199-200 (FC)
Dorothy introduces Oz to Christmas and of course Oz adds a few traditions of its own. Santa Claus comes to deliver holiday cheer and presents to all. The Wicked Witch has kidnapped Santa in an attempt to steal his magic.
45a	25a	"Doozy Of a Woozy"	Charles Visser	Jeff DeGrandis	November 15, 2019	187 (FC)
Woozy is led astray and is now lost.
45b	25b	"The Wizard Gets Witched"	Kexx Singleton	Mimi Hess	November 15, 2019	188 (FC)
The Wicked Witch hears wedding bells so she tries to marry the Wizard of Oz to get her powers back, but it backfires.
46a	26a	"Toto a Go Go!"	Jeff DeGrandis	Jeff DeGrandis	November 15, 2019	189 (FC)
While all of Oz is fast asleep, Toto takes a rescue mission on his own four little paws to rescue a baby rak who was trapped in a raging river!
46b	26b	"Captain Bill in Going Nowhere Fast"	Jeff DeGrandis	Jeff DeGrandis	November 15, 2019	190 (FC)
A swashbuckling adventure on the high skies with Cap'N Bill.

=== Season 3 (2020) ===
No. overall	No. in season	Title	Directed by	Written by	Original release date	Prod. code
47–48	1–2	"The Return of the Silver Slippers"	Charles Visser (Part 1-2); Brad Goodchild (Part 3-4)	Brad Birch	July 6, 2020 (Boomerang)	191-194 (FC)
Dorothy's Ruby Slippers suddenly stop working. Dorothy and friends try to retrieve the ruby slippers from Wilhelmina, but are met up with the Wicked Witch of the West who has somehow managed to call forth the spirit of the Wicked Witch of the East who has the silver slippers of ancient times whose magical power is equal to that of the ruby slippers. Dorothy learns the origin of both the silver and ruby slippers, and battles the witches over them.
49	3	"Monkey Business"	Kexx Singleton	Jim Martin	July 7, 2020 (Boomerang)	195-196 (FC)
Frank and Lyman become increasingly fed up of Wilhelmina and the Wicked Witch bossing them around, so they quit working for the witches and leave for Monkey Island.
50a	4a	"Beast in Show"	Charles Visser	Mimi Hess	July 8, 2020 (Boomerang)	197 (FC)
When Wilhelmina learns Toto is competing in a pet show, she creates her own pet: a hybrid named Salvador.
50b	4b	"The New Beast of the East"	Charles Visser	Mimi Hess	July 9, 2020 (Boomerang)	198 (FC)
51	5	"Oz on Ice"	Brad Goodchild	Luke Giordano	July 10, 2020 (Boomerang)	199-200 (FC)
In a story adaption of A Christmas Carol, the Wicked Witch gets sick of Christmas and bewitches Tall Tim the Christmas Tree, so Dorothy and the others decide to teach the wicked humbug a lesson.
52a	6a	"Naught a Fun Ride"	Kexx Singleton	Tiffany Lo and Ethel Lung	July 13, 2020 (Boomerang)	TBA
52b	6b	"Triple Something"	Kexx Singleton	Tiffany Lo and Ethel Lung	July 14, 2020 (Boomerang)	TBA
53a	7a	"Hatterday Night Fever"	Charles Visser	Jim Martin	July 15, 2020 (Boomerang)	TBA
Queen Ozma throws a fancy dress party in Emerald City, and Wilhelmina sneaks into the castle in disguise as Sandra St. Nice.
53b	7b	"Binkie Gets Her Groove Back"	Charles Visser	Tiffany Lo and Ethel Lung	July 16, 2020 (Boomerang)	TBA
54a	8a	"The Wicked Wizard"	Brad Goodchild	Luke Giordano	July 17, 2020 (Boomerang)	TBA
54b	8b	"Doggone Cat Crazy"	Brad Goodchild	Mimi Hess	July 20, 2020 (Boomerang)	TBA
On a rainy day, the Wicked Witch turns Dorothy, Lion, Tin Man and Scarecrow into cats.
55a	9a	"Guardians of the Gates of Yawn"	Kexx Singleton	Jim Martin	July 21, 2020 (Boomerang)	TBA
55b	9b	"Trip to the Moon"	Kexx Singleton	Mimi Hess	July 22, 2020 (Boomerang)	TBA
Dorothy, her friends, and the witches take a rocket trip to the Moon.
56	10	"The Good, the Wicked, and the Silver"	Kexx Singleton (Part 1); Charles Visser (Part 2)	Mimi Hess (Part 1); Luke Giordano (Part 2)	July 23, 2020 (Boomerang)	TBA
Dorothy discovers the answer is through the Quox hole to bottom side of the world and the Silver Fortress. The silver slippers put the Quox and silver army under the Wicked Witch's command, Dorothy escapes to warn others and gains the aid of the Witch Hunters.
57a	11a	"Three Eyes and a Baby"	Brad Goodchild	Mimi Hess	July 24, 2020 (Boomerang)	TBA
57b	11b	"Just for Kicks"	Brad Goodchild	Luke Giordano	July 28, 2020 (Boomerang)	TBA
58a	12a	"The Tin Champion"	Kexx Singleton	Luke Giordano	July 29, 2020 (Boomerang)	TBA
Tin Man becomes a superhero calling himself The Tin Champion, and Frank and Lyman become supervillains.
58b	12b	"North Meets West"	Kexx Singleton	Tiffany Lo and Ethel Lung	July 30, 2020 (Boomerang)	TBA
59	13	"Battle for the Silver Slippers"	Charles Visser	Brad Birch	July 31, 2020 (Boomerang)	TBA
After defeating the Wicked Witch of the East, the Wicked Witch of the West still has the Silver Slippers and Oz is still in danger, and the episode (and the series) ends with a cliffhanger, getting cancelled.
