= The Shnookums & Meat Funny Cartoon Show =

Television series

- Genre: Comedy; Slapstick
- Created by: Bill Kopp
- Written by: Bill Kopp
- Directed by: Jeff DeGrandis
- Voices of: Jason Marsden; Frank Welker; Charlie Adler; Jeff Bennett; Corey Burton; Jim Cummings; Brad Garrett; Jess Harnell; Steve Mackall; Tress MacNeille; April Winchell; Patric Zimmerman
- Narrated by: Jim Cummings (Pith Possum and Tex Tinstar segments)
- Theme music composer: John Jorgenson
- Composers: Drew Neumann; Nathan Wang
- Country of origin: United States
- Original language: English
- No. of seasons: 1
- No. of episodes: 13 (39 segments)

Production
- Producers: Bill Kopp; Jeff DeGrandis
- Running time: 23 minutes (8 minutes; Shnookums and Meat and Pith Possum segments) (4 minutes; Tex Tinstar)
- Production company: Walt Disney Television Animation

Original release
- Network: Syndication
- Release: January 2 – March 27, 1995

Related
- Marsupilami; Timon & Pumbaa

The Shnookums & Meat Funny Cartoon Show is a half-hour American animated comedy television series produced by Walt Disney Television Animation and aired in 1995 as a spin-off of the show Marsupilami, a spin-off itself of Raw Toonage. The show represents Disney's attempt to do a more "edgy" cartoon in the vein of Nickelodeon's The Ren & Stimpy Show and Rocko's Modern Life. Unlike other Disney Afternoon cartoons, Shnookums & Meat only aired once a week, usually Mondays. Only thirteen episodes were produced.

== Premise ==
This animated series follows three segment series.

=== Shnookums & Meat ===
This segment involves a cat named Shnookums (voiced by Jason Marsden) and a dog named Meat (voiced by Frank Welker) who do not get along very well. Their owners are unseen stock characters only viewed from the neck down and named (appropriately enough) Husband & Wife (voiced by Steve Mackall and Tress MacNeille). Husband is always referring to their home as their "domicile" before the two leave their pets in charge while they are away.

=== Pith Possum: Super Dynamic Possum of Tomorrow ===
A spoof of Batman, with the superhero Pith Possum (voiced by Jeff Bennett) and his sidekick Obediah the Wonder Raccoon (voiced by Patric Zimmerman) fighting crime in Possum City when called by the gorilla Commissioner Stress (voiced by Brad Garrett) and the monkey Lieutenant Tension (voiced by Jess Harnell). Pith Possum's true identity is lowly tabloid copyboy Peter Possum. Pith Possum fights various enemies with his recurring one being a mad lumberjack named Dr. Paul Bunion (voiced by Jim Cummings). Pith Possum (even when in his true identity) also has developed a crush on a female human reporter named Doris Deer (voiced by April Winchell) who mostly loves Pith Possum more than his true identity. It was stated in the first episode that Pith Possum was an ordinary lab opossum until he gained ultra opossum-like abilities upon an experiment gone wrong. The titles of the episodes are completely unrelated to their contents but rather (usually) over the top titles always using the word 'dark' or 'darkness' and often with the words 'black' and 'night' (e.g., "The Phantom Mask of the Dark Black Darkness of Black", "Return of the Night of Blacker Darkness", "Return of the Dark Mask of Phantom Blackness", etc.). Jim Cummings provided the narration in most episodes.

=== Tex Tinstar: The Best in the West ===
A parody of Wild West serials involving the cowboy Tex Tinstar (voiced by Jeff Bennett), his horse Here Boy, and Tex's friends Smelly Deputy Chafe (voiced by Charlie Adler), Percy Lacedaisy (voiced by Corey Burton), and Floyd the Insane Rattlesnake (voiced by Jess Harnell) who always get into trouble when pursuing a group of outlaws called the Wrong Riders consisting of Wrongo (voiced by Brad Garrett), Ian (voiced by Corey Burton in a homage to Paul Frees' character Inspector Fenwick from Dudley Do-Right), and Clem. The end of each episode ends in a cliffhanger for next week (not unlike old western serials or Rocky and Bullwinkle). Jim Cummings narrated each installment in a Western accent.

== Episodes ==
| No. | Title | Original release date | Prod. code |
|---|---|---|---|
| 1 | "Weight for Me" | January 2, 1995 | SM-1 |
| 1 | "The Phantom Mask of the Dark Black Darkness of Black" | January 2, 1995 | SM-1 |
| 1 | "A Fistful of Foodstamps" | January 2, 1995 | SM-1 |
When Shnookums and Meat gain 400 lbs, their owners expect them to lose weight. So Shnookums and Meat work to lose the weight before their owners return. A rabbit claiming to be the Easter Bunny has been released from the Asylum. As part of his crime wave, he creates a potion to make him large. After Wrongo escapes from prison, he reunites with the Wrong Riders in order to rob Bonehead and take revenge on Tex Tinstar.
| 2 | "Ow, Hey!" | January 9, 1995 | SM-2 |
| 2 | "Darkness on the Edge of Black" | January 9, 1995 | SM-2 |
| 2 | "For a Few Foodstamps More" | January 9, 1995 | SM-2 |
One day, Shnookums and Meat play a small baseball game in their backyard, but Meat keeps getting hit by the ball until it knocks him out. Dr. Paul Bunion creates a group of wooden robots in order to pull off a large string of robberies. Tex and Chafe are fired for failing to stop the Wrong Riders. Meanwhile, the Wrong Riders capture Percy Lacedaisy.
| 3 | "Buggin' Out" | January 16, 1995 | SM-3 |
| 3 | "Night of Darkness" | January 16, 1995 | SM-3 |
| 3 | "The Good, the Bland, and the Wiggly" | January 16, 1995 | SM-3 |
Shnookums and Meat concoct a new potion to get rid of their fleas, but the potion causes the fleas to enlarge and take over the house with Shnookums and Meat as their servants. A criminal in a bug costume is stealing baby supplies. With Percy Lacedaisy as their captive, the Wrong Riders work to pry the combination of the safe from him. Meanwhile, Tex and Chafe catch up too late to save Percy.
| 4 | "Poodle Panic" | January 23, 1995 | SM-4 |
| 4 | "The Darkness, It Is Dark!" | January 23, 1995 | SM-4 |
| 4 | "Low Pants Drifter" | January 23, 1995 | SM-4 |
Shnookums and Meat's poodle cousin, Toulouse, comes to visit, but he gets on their nerves. Dr. Paul Bunion kidnaps Obediah. With Obediah captured, Pith Possum can't operate anything around Possum Place which enables Dr. Paul Bunion to begin his next plot. Tex, Chafe, and Percy struggle to keep themselves from falling off a cliff into the forest fire below with the help of Floyd the Insane Rattlesnake.
| 5 | "Cabin Fever" | January 30, 1995 | SM-5 |
| 5 | "Return of the Night of Blacker Darkness" | January 30, 1995 | SM-5 |
| 5 | "Stale Rider" | January 30, 1995 | SM-5 |
One day, Shnookums and Meat get trapped in their house during an earthquake. They eat rotten cocktail weenies to survive, until they start hallucinating that a gang of living food is chasing them. Ralph Bear and Al Dog pose as Pith Possum and Obediah where they go on a crime spree to frame them. Pith Possum and Obediah must capture the imposters even when Doris Deer is captured. Still wanting to break into the stolen safe, Wrongo enlists a diminutive safecracker named Krusty Rustknuckle.
| 6 | "Pain in the Brain" | February 6, 1995 | SM-6 |
| 6 | "Haunt of the Night in Blacker Darkness" | February 6, 1995 | SM-6 |
| 6 | "Loathsome Dove" | February 6, 1995 | SM-6 |
Shnookums and Meat lose their brains when a piano falls on their heads, which leads to the two friends trying to clean their brains. Pith Possum finally scores a date with Doris Deer. This keeps getting ruined with Peter has to become Pith Possum to stop various criminal activities in Possum City. Tex, Chafe, Percy, and Floyd reach the Dead Duck Saloon to confront the Wrong Riders who are working to reattach Krusty's head to his body.
| 7 | "Step Ladder to Heaven" | February 13, 1995 | SM-7 |
| 7 | "Bride of Darkness" | February 13, 1995 | SM-7 |
| 7 | "The Magnificent Eleven" | February 13, 1995 | SM-7 |
Shnookums and Meat get hit by a truck and are sent to Limbo. They are questioned by a tough supervisor who will determine if they will go to Heaven or Hell (referred to as "The Hot Place"). Displeased that all of Possum City hates bugs, Shirley Pimple enlarges her termites in a plot to destroy all of Possum City. During the fight at the Dead Duck Saloon, Tex follows Wrongo deep in the waters of a bathtub where Wrongo manages to tie Tex to a shipwreck with sharks nearby.
| 8 | "Kung Fu Kitty" | February 20, 1995 | SM-8 |
| 8 | "Son of the Cursed Black of Darkness" | February 20, 1995 | SM-8 |
| 8 | "Saddlesores, Sagebrush and Seaweed" | February 20, 1995 | SM-8 |
Shnookums is alarmed when his owners buy a dog named Meat, but he learns kung-fu to defend himself. Super Water Buffalo organizes his own crimes to stop in order to outdo Pith Possum. As each one is stopped, this leads Pith Possum and Obediah to find another line of work. After escaping from the sharks, Tex meets up with Chafe, Percy, and Floyd where they and the Wrong Riders have found that Krusty has made off with the safe. To make matters worse, Krusty escaped on Here Boy.
| 9 | "I.Q. You Too!" | February 27, 1995 | SM-9 |
| 9 | "The Light of Darkness" | February 27, 1995 | SM-9 |
| 9 | "Slap-Happy Trails" | February 27, 1995 | SM-9 |
Shnookums and Meat use brain-enhancing devices to come up with evermore violent pranks to commit against each other. Pith Possum and Obediah go to a superhero convention in Possum City where they are not taken lightly by the attending superheroes. Pith has the opportunity to turn this around when Dr. Paul Bunion attacks each of the superheroes. Both Tex's group and the Wrong Riders continue their pursuit of Krusty as they each set up camp in the desert at night.
| 10 | "Something's Fishy" | March 6, 1995 | SM-10 |
| 10 | "Return of the Dark Mask of Phantom Blackness" | March 6, 1995 | SM-10 |
| 10 | "My Spine Hurts" | March 6, 1995 | SM-10 |
The pet fish learns how to make itself evolve, and turns into a giant monster that terrorizes Shnookums and Meat. Dr. Paul Bunion enlarges a lizard to gigantic size so that he can have it uproot the trees in Possum City. After Krusty meets his doom at the hands of the Polite Coyotes, Tex and Chafe recover Here Boy and continue their pursuit of the Wrong Riders.
| 11 | "Night of the Living Shnookums" | March 13, 1995 | SM-11 |
| 11 | "Dark of the Darker Darkness" | March 13, 1995 | SM-11 |
| 11 | "The Vinyl Frontier" | March 13, 1995 | SM-11 |
On a stormy night, Meat thinks he has killed Shnookums. But it is not the last he has seen of Shnookums. Pith Possum gets his brain damaged by his Cranium Crasher Mariachi Cannon and starts acting like different people. Obediah must work to get Pith Possum back to normal when Supper Squirrel raids every food business in Possum City. Tex's group catches up to the Wrong Riders. Meanwhile, a fragment of a doomed planet heads toward Earth.
| 12 | "Jingle Bells, Something Smells" | March 20, 1995 | SM-12 |
| 12 | "Dark Quest for Darkness" | March 20, 1995 | SM-12 |
| 12 | "Hey, Careful, That's My Cerebellum" | March 20, 1995 | SM-12 |
Meat's smelly sock fells Santa, and now he and Shnookums must drive the sleigh in his place. Pearl arrives in Possum City to visit her grandson. She starts to defeat some criminals while bringing hardship to Pith Possum and Obediah. Tex is able to save Chafe, Floyd, and the Wrong Riders from being hurled into the Sun. Afterwards, the Wrong Riders get the drop on them and leave them to be dinner for the Polite Coyotes.
| 13 | "What a Turkey" | March 27, 1995 | SM-13 |
| 13 | "Light or Dark Meat?" | March 27, 1995 | SM-13 |
| 13 | "There are Spiders All Over Me" | March 27, 1995 | SM-13 |
Shnookums works to cut up Mr. Gobble for Thanksgiving dinner, but Meat is determined to save his new friend. Pith Possum and Obediah take a vacation on a cruise ship called the S.S. Gasbubble. They are unaware that the captain is actually a disguised Dr. Paul Bunion. Percy, re-entering Earth's atmosphere following the planet fragment, hitting Earth, inadvertently saves Tex, Chafe, and Floyd from the Polite Coyotes. This enables Tex's group to have a final showdown with the Wrong Riders.

== Cast ==
- Jason Marsden as Shnookums
- Frank Welker as Meat, Flea 1 (in "Bugging Out!"), Elves (in "Jingle Bells, Something Smells"), Fish Monster (in "Something's Fishy"), TV Announcer (in "Night of the Living Shnookums"), Panicking Dog (in "Step-Ladder to Heaven"), Supervisor (in "Step-Ladder to Heaven")
- Charlie Adler as Chafe, Pearl (in "Dark Quest for Darkness")
- Jeff Bennett as Pith Possum/Peter Possum, Tex Tinstar
- Corey Burton as Ian, Percy Lacedaisy, Krusty Rustknuckle, Ultra Guy Man Dude (in "The Light of Darkness")
- Jim Cummings as Narrator, Dr. Paul Bunion, Mr. Kane, Ralph Bear (in "Return of the Night of Blacker Darkness"), Supper Squirrel (in "Dark of the Darker Darkness"), Caped Cod (in "The Light of Darkness")
- Brad Garrett as Commissioner Stress, Wrongo, Super Water Buffalo (in "Son of the Cursed Black of Darkness"), Shirley Pimple (in "Bride of Darkness"), Santa Claus (in "Jingle Bells, Something Smells")
- Jess Harnell as Lieutenant Tension, Floyd the Insane Rattlesnake, Polite Coyotes, Easter Bunny Imposter (in "Phantom Mask of the Dark Black Darkness of Black"), Al Dog (in "Return of the Night of Blacker Darkness"), Spidey (in "Bride of Darkness"), Power Weasel (in "The Light of Darkness"), Bat Guy (in "The Light of Darkness")
- Bill Kopp as Polite Coyote
- Steve Mackall as Husband, Stagecoach Driver (in "For a Few Foodstamps More"), Flea 2 (in "Bugging Out!"), Toulouse and Dirk (in "Poodle Panic"), Scientist (in "I.Q. You, Too!"), Elf 2 (in "Jingle Bells, Something Smells")
- Tress MacNeille as Wife, Burglar 1 (in "Kung-Fu Kitty"), Flea 3 (in "Bugging Out!"), Cat Girl (in "Step-Ladder to Heaven"), Dog Girl (in "Step-Ladder to Heaven"), and Darlene and Donna (in "Poodle Panic")
- April Winchell as Doris Deer, Registration Lady (in "The Light of Darkness"), Wowee Woman (in "The Light of Darkness")
- Patric Zimmerman as Obediah the Wonder Raccoon

== Production ==
Shnookums & Meat was created and written by Bill Kopp, who also created Toonsylvania and Mad Jack the Pirate. The show was directed by Jeff DeGrandis. Kopp was the voice of Eek! The Cat from Fox Kids and Yuckie Duck from The What-A-Cartoon! Show on Cartoon Network.

The idea for a series starring a cat and dog was pitched to Kopp and DeGrandis by Greg Weisman, a development executive at Walt Disney Television Animation who was also developing Gargoyles at the time.

Disney previously reached out to Carbunkle Cartoons (one of the animation studios that worked on The Ren & Stimpy Show) to work on the show's animation, but they declined due to Disney's unwillingness to put up the same amount of money that they received from Spümcø.

== Segments on "Marsupilami" ==
Shnookums & Meat originated as a segment on Disney's 1993 series Marsupilami. Five episodes were shown on that series, and were later run again as part of the actual Shnookums & Meat series in 1995. These episodes were:

- "Kung-Fu Kitty"
- "I.Q. You, Too"
- "Night of the Living Shnookums"
- "Something's Fishy"
- "Jingle Bells, Something Smells"

== Broadcast history ==
The series aired on The Disney Afternoon on Mondays between January 2 and March 27, 1995, in the timeslot normally occupied by Bonkers. Reruns were later shown on Toon Disney. The Tex Tinstar segments were shown out of order on Disney Channel UK in 2003 to fill the then frequently gapped schedule. The show last aired on Friday, July 6, 2007, on Toon Disney during the Mega Jam block.

Following the launch of the Disney+ video on demand streaming service in November 2019, Shnookums and Meat along with Aladdin (based on the 1992 film of the same name) are the only Disney Afternoon series not seen yet on the platform.

== Reception ==
=== Critical reception ===
Reviewing the series for The Washington Post, Scott More found the main Shnookums & Meat segments to be the weakest, preferring Tex Tinstar and especially Pith Possum, singling out Jeff Bennett's voice work on both segments for praise. Kenneth M. Chanko of the New York Daily News gave the series a positive review, stating that, while not up to the same standard as series like Warner Bros. Animation's Animaniacs or Nickelodeon's Rocko's Modern Life, he considered it "a hoot and a half". Evan Levine of the Newspaper Enterprise Association noted that his son liked it, and felt that it had good animation and clever humor, saying that "kids may enjoy the freewheeling mix of physical comedy and silliness".

As of May 1995, it was reported that Shnookums & Meat had a rating of 4.1/16 among kids 2–11, 4.3/18 among kids 6–11, and 1.7/13 among teenagers. Kopp had claimed in an interview with Animato! that these numbers would've been enough to justify a renewal on a competing network, citing Fox Kids as an example. Despite this, it was quietly cancelled after only one season; it was removed from the Disney Afternoon lineup at the start of the 1995–96 television season.

=== Comparisons ===
Martin "Dr. Toon" Goodman of Animation World Magazine described The Shnookums & Meat Funny Cartoon Show as one of two The Ren & Stimpy Show "clones", with the other one being 2 Stupid Dogs.
