= Dorothy and the Wizard of Oz =

Children's animated television series

- Genre: Fantasy Educational Comedy Slapstick
- Based on: The Wonderful Wizard of Oz by L. Frank Baum; The Wizard of Oz by Noel Langley, Florence Ryerson & Edgar Allan Woolf
- Voices of: Kari Wahlgren; Bill Fagerbakke; Jess Harnell; J.P. Karliak; Jessica DiCicco; Laraine Newman; Tom Kenny; Grey DeLisle-Griffin; Steve Blum
- Opening theme: Somewhere Over the Rainbow (instrumental)
- Ending theme: Somewhere Over the Rainbow (instrumental)
- Composers: Sunna Wehrmeijer; Peter Bateman (S1–2)
- Country of origin: United States
- Original language: English
- No. of seasons: 3
- No. of episodes: 59 (list of episodes)

Production
- Executive producer: Sam Register
- Producers: Jeff DeGrandis; Michelle Jabloner-Weiss (S1, S3)
- Editor: Philip Malamuth
- Running time: 22 minutes
- Production companies: Turner Entertainment Co. Warner Bros. Animation

Original release
- Network: Boomerang SVOD; Boomerang (2018–2020)
- Release: June 29, 2017 – July 31, 2020

Related
- The Wizard of Oz

Dorothy and the Wizard of Oz is an American animated television series loosely based on L. Frank Baum's 1900 novel The Wonderful Wizard of Oz and its subsequent books, as well as its 1939 film adaptation. First broadcast on Boomerang channels in June 2017, new episodes aired for three seasons ending July 2020.

== Plot ==
After the Wicked Witch of the West was melted by water, (Note: As depicted in The Wizard of Oz (1939)) Queen Ozma crowned Dorothy Gale as the new princess of Emerald City. While wearing the Ruby Slippers, Dorothy executes her royal duties. Whether its magic, Munchkins, winged monkeys or her nemesis Wilhelmina, the wicked witch-in-training and niece of the Wicked Witch of the West, Dorothy can put a stop to any problem that comes Oz's way, with help from her dog Toto and the Scarecrow, Tin Man and Cowardly Lion.

At the start of the second season, the Wizard of Oz ends up back in Oz after another tornado. Now that he has returned at last, he plots to make himself into a real wizard by getting actual magic powers. When he finds out about the Wicked Witch's spirit being trapped in her crystal ball, he decides to help resurrect her in exchange for powers (not knowing that it takes years to get powers), but it backfired and Dorothy accidentally resurrects the Wicked Witch without her powers. Regardless on the outcome, this puts the Land of Oz in serious danger now.

== Characters ==
=== Main ===
- Dorothy Gale (voiced by Kari Wahlgren) – The farm girl from Kansas who currently lives in Oz as the new princess of Emerald City. She is a very brave and courageous princess. She's got an extremely kind heart, and will always help her friends out of danger. Aside from her cheerful nature, Dorothy very rarely gets angry, as it has happened twice in the show: The first time being when Wilhelmina controlled her emotions with a mood ring and the second time being before the wicked Nome King turned Dorothy into a white cat. However, aside from all this, Dorothy is sweet, quick-thinking, helpful, friendly and amicable. She not only exhibits the power not just to transport herself, but those around her as well. In Season 3, she has unlocked additional uses for it, including the ability to create objects (e.g. red pillows, four individual protective red forcefields around herself and three best friends, a large force field around all of them, a catcher's mitt and a giant bowling ball). She's best friends with Toto, Scarecrow, Tin Man, and Cowardly Lion.
- Toto – Dorothy's pet dog. It is revealed in "Dorothy's Christmas in Oz" that Dorothy got Toto as a Christmas present from Santa back when she lived in Kansas.
- Queen Ozma (voiced by Kari Wahlgren) – The queen of Emerald City and Dorothy's best friend. Previously trapped by the Nome King, Dorothy rescued Ozma and took her rightful place as queen.
- Tin Man (voiced by J.P. Karliak) – The tin humanoid who acts like a robot and provides his friends with useful items contained inside of him.
- Cowardly Lion (voiced by Jess Harnell) – A lion who is the not-so fearless king of the forest and the muscle of the group.
- Scarecrow (voiced by Bill Fagerbakke) – The wise and intelligent scarecrow who helps provide useful information to his friends when going on adventures and the brains of the group.
- Wizard of Oz (voiced by Tom Kenny) – An ordinary man and the former ruler of Oz when Ozma was missing. He later returned to Oz in season two in order to become an actual wizard. The Wizard now has the Wicked Witch's powers after battling her when she returned.
- Good Witch Glinda (voiced by Grey DeLisle-Griffin) – The Good Witch of the North and a motherly figure to Dorothy. In season three, it is revealed that Glinda originally owned the Ruby Slippers before the Wicked Witch of the East stole them. She once nearly sent Dorothy back to Kansas when Wilhelmina was controlling Dorothy's emotions with a mood ring during the events of the episode "Moody Magic".

=== Villains ===
- Wilhelmina (voiced by Jessica DiCicco) – The wicked witch-in-training and the spoiled niece of both Wicked Witches of the East and West who serves as Dorothy's nemesis. Her goal is to get rid of Dorothy and obtain the ruby slippers so that she and her aunt can rule the Land of Oz. Unlike her aunts however, Wilhelmina does not have a weakness to water as seen when she once fell into the Truth Pond.
- Wicked Witch of the West (voiced by Laraine Newman) – The witch and an old nemesis of Dorothy who was melted upon getting hit with water. Her spirit resided in the crystal ball advising Wilhemina to get the Ruby Slippers needed to restore her. In Season 2, she returned but lost her powers to the Wizard.
- Nome King (voiced by J.P. Karliak) – The Nome and the ruler of the Nome Kingdom who conspires to rule the Land of Oz. Like the books, he has a fear of eggs and chickens.
- Wicked Witch of the East (voiced by Tom Kenny) – The Wicked Witch of the West's late sister and Wilhelmina's other aunt.
- Mean Geanne the Green (voiced by Kari Wahlgren) – A big, strong tough-looking witch who is the Wicked Witch of the West's longtime arch-nemesis. After learning the Wicked Witch lost her powers, she takes over the castle and Wilhelmina appears scared of her.
- Melinda the Mean (voiced by Grey DeLisle) – The bad witch and twin sister of good witch Glinda.
- Crank (voiced by Jess Harnell) – The leader of the Wheelers.
- Wheelers
- Frank and Lyman (voiced by Steve Blum and Jess Harnell) – Wilhelmina's winged monkey henchmen who often unsuccessfully attempt to hinder Dorothy and her friends in order to obtain the ruby slippers and give it to Wilhelmina. Frank is the larger winged monkey and Lyman is the smaller incompetent winged monkey. They are named after the author of the original Oz books Lyman Frank Baum.
- Kaliko (voiced by Bill Fagerbakke) – The Nome who serves as the servant of the Nome King.
- Boolooroo (voiced by Jim Cummings) – Captain Bill's arch-nemesis.

=== Other ===
- Patchwork Girl (voiced by Jessica DiCicco) – A human-sized female ragdoll who is Scarecrow's love interest.
- Marie (voiced by Kari Wahlgren) – The Queen of the Field Mice and Lion’s love interest.
- Polychrome (voiced by Grey DeLisle) – The daughter of the Rainbow and Tin Man’s love interest.
- Mayor of Munchkinland (voiced by Bill Fagerbakke) – The Munchkin and the mayor of Munchkinland.
- Woozy (voiced by J. P. Karliak) – A four-legged creature.
- Jack Pumpkinhead (voiced by J. P. Karliak) – A sentient simulacrum who was created by Wilhelmina and later became friends with Dorothy and the Ozians.
- Tik-Tok (voiced by Jess Harnell) – The mechanical man and the brother figure to Tin Man.
- Hungry Tiger (voiced by Bill Fagerbakke) – The tiger and Lion's good friend who loves to eat. His favourite food is scones, and if he doesn't get any, he will destroy China Country, though he almost did in "Moody Magic" due to Wilhelmina controlling Dorothy's emotions with a mood ring.
- Eureka (voiced by Kari Wahlgren) – A baby kitten who lives in Purrville in the Valley of Pussycats and befriends Lion.
- Ojo (voiced by Kari Wahlgren) – A young Munchkin from Munchkinland.
- General Jinjur (voiced by Kari Wahlgren) – The military leader of her all-female army who dance-battle their enemies.
- Captain Bill (voiced by E.G. Daily)
- Santa Claus (voiced by Kevin Michael Richardson) – A big red magic jolly festive man who brought Christmas to Oz.
- Smith and Tinker (voiced by J. P. Karliak and Bill Fagerbakke)
- Baron Fernando von Soozle (voiced by Tom Kenny) – A witch hunter.
- Baroness Bunchausen (voiced by Jess Harnell) – The baroness of Bunbury.
- Duchess Doofus (voiced by Kari Wahlgren) – The duchess of the Isle of Dofi.

== Episodes ==
Season	Episodes	Originally released	
Season	Episodes	First released	Last released
1	20	June 29, 2017	April 12, 2018
2	26	May 24, 2018	November 15, 2019
3	13	July 6, 2020	July 31, 2020

== Broadcast ==
The weekly broadcast series premiered on Boomerang in Australia on June 26, 2017.

The first 13 episodes of Dorothy and the Wizard of Oz were released on Boomerang's SVOD service in the United States on June 29, 2017.

In October 2017, the series premiered on Boomerang in Africa and Boomerang in the United Kingdom.

The series had its broadcast debut on the Boomerang channel in the United States on May 21, 2018.

In Canada, the series premiered on Treehouse TV on June 2, 2018.

The series subsequently began airing on Cartoon Network on December 21, 2018.

== Home media ==
We're Not in Kansas Anymore, a DVD containing the first ten episodes of the series, was released on March 27, 2018. Emerald City was the second DVD released for the series on June 12, 2018 with ten episodes.

== See also ==
- The Wizard of Oz (TV series)
