= The Adventures of Hyperman (TV series) =

- Genre: Superhero comedy
- Based on: The Adventures of Hyperman by Ken Corr; Kevin O'Donnell; Craig Southard
- Developed by: Alex Kirwan
- Written by: David Finley; Cliff MacGillivray
- Directed by: Bert Ring
- Voices of: Steve Mackall; Max Casella; Maurice LaMarche; Frank Welker; Tamera Mowry
- Narrated by: Neil Ross
- Theme music composer: Eric Allaman
- Composers: Randall Crissman; Terry Wilson
- Country of origin: United States
- Original language: English
- No. of seasons: 1
- No. of episodes: 13

Production
- Executive producers: Willard Carroll; Thomas Wilhite; Ken Corr; Kevin O'Donnell; Craig Southard
- Running time: 22 minutes (two 11-minute segments)
- Production companies: Hyperion Animation; Illumination Studios; Columbia TriStar Television

Original release
- Network: CBS
- Release: October 14, 1995 – August 10, 1996

The Adventures of Hyperman is an American animated series that aired from October 14, 1995 to August 10, 1996 on CBS. The show features an intergalactic sheriff fighting the evil monster Entrobe and his sidekick Kidd Chaos. Hyperman is joined by his own sidekicks, Studd Puppy and 13-year-old science genius Emma C. Squared. The only voice actor to appear in both the game and the cartoon is Frank Welker.

== Background ==
The program is based on the video game The Adventures of Hyperman. The game was created by Kevin O'Donnell, Ken Corr and Crag Southard. It was released as a CD-ROM by IBM prior to running as an animated series.

== Voice cast ==
- Steve Mackall as Hyperman
- Max Casella as Studd Puppy
- Maurice LaMarche as Kidd Chaos/Comptroller
- Frank Welker as Entrobe
- Mayim Bialik as Brittany Bright
- Tamera Mowry as Emma C. Squared
- Neil Ross as the Narrator
