= Raw Toonage =

Disney animated cartoon program

- Genre: Anthology; Comedy; Slapstick
- Created by: Larry Latham; Ed Wexler
- Written by: Laraine Arkow; Shari Goodhartz; Ralph Sanchez; Robert Schechter; Gary Sperling
- Voices of: Jeff Bennett; Rodger Bumpass; Nancy Cartwright; Jim Cummings; Steve Mackall
- Theme music composer: Patrick DeRemer
- Opening theme: "Raw Toonage Theme Song"
- Ending theme: "Raw Toonage Theme Song" (Short Version)
- Composers: Stephen James Taylor; Mark Watters; Eric Schmidt; Jerry Grant; Walter Murphy; Craig Stuart Garfinkle
- Country of origin: United States
- Original language: English
- No. of seasons: 1
- No. of episodes: 12 (39 segments)

Production
- Producers: Larry Latham (He's Bonkers, Totally Tasteless Video and host segments only); Ed Wexler (Marsupilami cartoons only)
- Running time: 23 minutes
- Production company: Walt Disney Television Animation

Original release
- Network: CBS
- Release: September 19 – December 5, 1992

Related
- Bonkers; Marsupilami

Raw Toonage is an American animated cartoon program that premiered on CBS on September 19, and ended on December 5, 1992, after 12 episodes or 39 shorts and segments had been broadcast. The program was preceded by a He's Bonkers theatrical short titled Petal to the Metal that aired on August 7, 1992.

Bonkers was spun off from the He's Bonkers short series and Marsupilami was spun off from Marsupilami short series of the program in 1993. The Shnookums & Meat Funny Cartoon Show then was spun off from Marsupilami in 1995.

== Cast ==
=== Main ===
- Jeff Bennett as Jitters A. Dog
- Rodger Bumpass as Grumbles the Grizzly
- Nancy Cartwright as Fawn Deer
- Jim Cummings as Bonkers D. Bobcat, Maurice, Norman, Don Karnage (guest star from TaleSpin), Leonardo the Refined Lion
- Steve Mackall as Marsupilami

=== Guest stars ===
- René Auberjonois as Chef Louie (from The Little Mermaid)
- Corey Burton as Ludwig Von Drake, Captain Hook (from Peter Pan)
- Christine Cavanaugh as Gosalyn Mallard (from Darkwing Duck)
- Bill Farmer as Goofy (with his style from Goof Troop)
- Terry McGovern as Launchpad McQuack (from DuckTales and Darkwing Duck)
- Samuel E. Wright as Sebastian (from The Little Mermaid)
- Alan Young as Scrooge McDuck (from DuckTales)

=== Additional voices ===
- June Foray as Aunt Mindy
- Rita Moreno as Tanya Trunk (episode 2)

=== Crew ===
- Ginny McSwain – Dialogue Director
- Jamie Thomason – Talent Coordinator

== Short series and segments ==
- Gray = Hosting — 9 segments, also indicating Goofy starring in "Goofy's Guide to the Olympics" in the sixth episode.
- Blue = He's Bonkers — 11 shorts, excluding the first short Petal to the Metal (August 7, 1992)
  - In that short, Bonkers has to deliver flowers to the starlet Fawn Deer in 5 minutes or else he's fired by his boss Grumbles.
- Green = Marsupilami — 16 shorts, 13 of which became third segments of the episodes of its spin off show in 1993. It is also the only short series to appear in every episode.
- Red = Totally Tasteless Video — 11 shorts that don't have any logical or chronological connection.

No.	Title	Original release date
1	"Spatula Party"	September 19, 1992
1	"Doggie Schnauzer"	September 19, 1992
1	"Marsupilami Meets Dr. Normanstein"	September 19, 1992
(Hosting.) Ludwig Von Drake demonstrates various principals of toon physics. (1.) Bonkers' new neighbor Fawn wants to borrow a spatula, so he scurries all around the neighborhood trying to get one. NOTE: It was originally the first "He's Bonkers" short to be aired on Raw Toonage, but is the second in overall shorts. (2.) The life of a man who swallowed a washing machine depends on Doggie Schnauzer. (3.) Marsupilami and Maurice stumble onto the laboratory of Dr. Normanstein, who happens to be looking for a brain for his new monster, Apenstein.
2	"Sheerluck Bonkers"	September 26, 1992
2	"All Potato Network"	September 26, 1992
2	"The Puck Stops Here"	September 26, 1992
(Hosting.) Don Karnage shows us how to look for treasure, with mixed results. (1.) Victorian-era detective Sheerluck Bonkers tries to find out who's stolen a priceless pendant from Princess Fawn of Doe-mania. (2.) This channel features programming of shows and specials, like All My Spuds and Spudsky & Hutch. (3.) Norman uses the hotel air conditioning system to freeze the lake and challenge Mars to a game of hockey.
3	"Bonkers in Space"	October 3, 1992
3	"Cro-Magnum PI"	October 3, 1992
3	"The Treasure of the Sierra Marsdre"	October 3, 1992
(Hosting.) Scrooge McDuck demonstrates the new security system he's installed in his money bin, by trying to break in. (1.) In the future, Bonkers and Jitters work at a spaceship-wash outfit in a space station, but Jitters accidentally gets cast into space while Bonkers puts the moves on Fawn. (2.) A Stone Age gumshoe investigates Rock Doo-Wop's theft of ideas for new inventions from other cavepeople like the wheel and fire. (3.) Norman spies on Mars and Maurice planning to go on a treasure hunt and worms his way into joining them.
4	"Draining Cats and Dogs"	October 10, 1992
4	"Mars vs. Man"	October 10, 1992
(Hosting.) Sebastian tries to get to the Mervin Peevish Convention Center in time to host a variety show, avoiding being caught by Chef Louie along the way. (1.) Grumbles sends Bonkers and Jitters to rescue Fawn when her pipes burst and flood her house. (2.) Foreman Norman uproots Mars' tree to make space for his condominiums, but Mars squats in one of them.
5	"Get Me to the Church on Time"	October 17, 1992
5	"So You Think You Know Everything, Do You?"	October 17, 1992
5	"Someone's in the Kitchen with Mars"	October 17, 1992
(Hosting.) Jitters does stunt work for four Disney shows. (1.) Bonkers and Jitters have a difficult time getting to Jitters' wedding with Tanya in time. (2.) Two certified geniuses compete on a game show with each other and a dog. (3.) Chef Norman steals Mars and Maurice's big basket of fruit. Mars and Maurice track him to the hotel kitchen.
6	"Ski Patrol"	October 24, 1992
6	"Poultrygeist"	October 24, 1992
6	"Romancing the Clone"	October 24, 1992
6	"Goofy's Guide to the Olympics"	October 24, 1992
(Hosting.) Bonkers tries to deliver a TV to Fawn's house. (1.) Paramedics Bonkers and Jitters go to take the injured skier Grumbles to the Plummet Summit Hospital for Nurse Fawn Deer. (2.) A family is alarmed to find out that their house was built on the site of a fast-food chicken restaurant, and now the poltergeists of the chickens eaten there terrorize them until an exorchicken arrives. (3.) Norman dresses up as a female Marsupilami to deceive a tourist that's trying to take a picture of a Marsupilami. But Mars falls in love with Norman. (4.) Goofy demonstrates various track and field events.
7	"Get Me a Pizza (Hold the Minefield)"	October 31, 1992
7	"Nightmare on Rocky Road"	October 31, 1992
7	"Wanna Be Ruler"	October 31, 1992
7	"The Porker's Court"	October 31, 1992
(1.) A black-and-white newsreel tells of how WW1 hero Bonkers bravely delivered pizzas to our boys in the front. (2.) A boy who loves ice cream gets his wish when the whole world turns to ice cream and now he must face Freddy Scooper. (3.) Mars and Norman compete for the title of ruler of the Wannabe tribe, and the treasure that comes with it. (4.) The Three Pigs take the Big Bad Wolf to the Porker's Court over the shoddy conditions of the houses that he's leased to them.
8	"Dogzapoppin'"	November 7, 1992
8	"Bathtime for Maurice"	November 7, 1992
8	"Fear of Kites"	November 7, 1992
(Hosting.) Launchpad gives lessons in flying. (1.) Bonkers has to get an important package to his boss, Grumbles, but he can't get past Grumbles' nasty dog. (2.) Mars has to go through a lot of trouble to get filthy Maurice to take a bath. (3.) Mars and Maurice's kite gets tangled up on the hotel rooftop, but Bellhop Norman won't let them inside to retrieve it.
9	"Trail Mix Bonkers"	November 14, 1992
9	"The Young and the Nestless"	November 14, 1992
9	"Coming Attractions"	November 14, 1992
9	"Jungle Fever"	November 14, 1992
(1.) Pony express rider Trail Mix Bonkers delivers two money plates to California and fights the Grumbles Kid. (2.) Mars reminisces about a time when a young Mars and Maurice fought a kid-age Norman over Mars's comic book collection. (3.) The snack bar where you can get popcorn, hot dogs, nachos with cheese and drinks and see movies like Totzilla and Rambones. (4.) Mars tries to cure Maurice, but Maurice keeps sneezing into the way of a refined lion named Leonardo.
10	"Witch Doctor Is Which?"	November 21, 1992
10	"Robin Hoof"	November 21, 1992
10	"The Hairy Ape"	November 21, 1992
(Hosting.) Gosalyn enthusiastically eggs on Ludwig Von Drake to build a monster for her. (1.) Witch Doctor Norman places a series of curses on Mars so that he instead of Mars will be the happiest person in the jungle. (2.) Robin Hoof and his sidekick Milk Maid Marion protect the people of Sherman Forest from the evil king and his men. (3.) Norman traps Maurice to take to the zoo, telling Mars that he's taking him to a party, but Mars wants to go, too.
11	"Quest for Firewood"	November 28, 1992
11	"Badly Animated Man"	November 28, 1992
11	"Safari So Good"	November 28, 1992
(Hosting.) Marsupilami teaches Maurice how to defend himself against a bully. (1.) In prehistoric times, Bonkers searches for firewood to bring back to his freezing tribe. (2.) Meet Badly Animated Man, the superhero who can leap over a tall building with a single drawing, and who wields a Two-Frame-a-Minute Punch. (3.) Mindy pays a visit and takes an immediate liking to Mars.
12	"Gobble Gobble Bonkers"	December 5, 1992
12	"Hot Spots"	December 5, 1992
12	"My New Shoes"	December 5, 1992
12	"Prime Mates Forever"	December 5, 1992
(1.) Jitters lets Bonkers take one of his beloved farm turkeys to Grumbles for Thanksgiving dinner, not realizing that she is the dinner. NOTE: It is originally the last "He's Bonkers" short. (2.) A heat wave, a watering hole and Norman all combine to make trouble for the jungle residents. (3.) A kid raps about all the cool things he can do with his new shoes. (4.) Mars helps Maurice try to romance a tough female gorilla.

== History and production ==
The idea for the show had an unusual genesis. Walt Disney Television Animation was developing a 65-episode half-hour series for their Disney Afternoon block entitled He's Bonkers D. Bobcat. The premise was similar to Who Framed Roger Rabbit, as the series dealt with the lead character's adventures post-stardom. The actual production of this series was troubled. At some point, someone had the post-modern idea to actually make the cartoons that Bonkers had starred in before becoming a policeman, and Disney's Raw Toonage was born. At the same time, Michael Eisner had purchased the rights to the popular Belgian comic strip Marsupilami created by André Franquin. Totally Tasteless Video was intended as a satire of popular culture. A host segment was added to give the program the familiar feel of the World of Disney show.

Due to the shorter production schedule, Disney's Raw Toonage was on the air before the above-mentioned half-hour program, thus adding some credibility to the back story. The program typically opens with an introduction by a famous character from Disney (such as Goofy with his style from Disney's Goof Troop), who attempts to share some of their expertise with the audience; then the show has a few of the above-mentioned shorts chained in a row, rounding out the half hour.

=== He's Bonkers ===
The premise of the He's Bonkers shorts is that Bonkers is a delivery person or a proto-hero, usually assisted by Jitters A. Dog. Conflict is provided by Bonkers' love for Fawn Deer, who mainly reciprocates his love for her. Bonkers also has a strict boss or an arch enemy, called Grumbles the Grizzly. Jitters, Fawn and Grumbles also appear in the series Bonkers. Each of the He's Bonkers shorts were eventually included in 4 special extra compilation episodes of the half-hour series. He's Bonkers series has 12 shorts overall.

=== Marsupilami ===
The Marsupilami shorts took the look of the character from the Belgian comic, but the characterization differs significantly; Marsupilami is more anthropomorphized, and speaks the language of the human characters fluently, Marsupilami in the comics can only say variations of "houba" and mimic sounds like a parrot. The secondary characters in Disney's Marsupilami series are completely different from those of the comics; in the Disney cartoons, Marsupilami is most often opposed by Norman, who appears in various different roles. Every one but three ("Wannabe Ruler?", "The Young and the Nestless", and "Hot Spots") of the Marsupilami shorts were not included in the half-hour Marsupilami series. Marsupilami short series has 16 shorts overall.

=== Totally Tasteless Video ===
Totally Tasteless Video did each show in a different style. They were stories edited by Tom Minton, who would later write Pinky and the Brain at Warner Bros. The first Totally Tasteless Video short is a parody of movie coming attraction trailers, followed by a spoof on Doogie Howser, M.D. Other notable shorts involve a badly animated superhero, a prehistoric spoof of Magnum, P.I., an exorchicken fighting chicken ghosts that haunt a family, and a Robin Hood twist in the Jay Ward style of cartoons. Totally Tasteless Video series has 11 shorts overall and it didn't have its spin-off TV series.

Larry Latham produced and directed the He's Bonkers, Totally Tasteless Video, and host segments; Ed Wexler produced and directed Marsupilami. At least one of the Marsupilami cartoons was produced with the idea of a theatrical run in mind.

Reruns of the program were aired on Disney Channel, and Toon Disney. Disney's Raw Toonage was nominated for a Daytime Emmy in the category of outstanding writing in an animated program and Outstanding Music Direction and Composition in 1993. Music was composed by Stephen James Taylor (character themes and underscore), Mark Watters, Eric Schmidt, Jerry Grant, Walter Murphy, and Craig Stuart Garfinkle. As of 2002, this program is no longer shown following a lawsuit filed against Disney for the breach of contract with use of the character Marsupilami in 1997 as the rights were handed back to Marsu Productions a few years later.
