= Fingos =

Discontinued General Mills cereal

Fingos is a discontinued breakfast cereal snack from General Mills that lasted from 1993 to 1994. The cereal was advertised as a snack which confused consumers. The box was voiced in television commercials by comedian Steve Mackall.

== Background ==
Fingos was worked on for three or four years prior to its release in 1993. It was a cereal that was meant to be eaten with fingers as a snack and without milk. The cereal pieces were shaped as hexagons and were advertised as food that could be eaten at any time of the day. Analyst John McMillin said, "The idea here is to turn a cereal into a healthy snack" and that "it's a little like Pepsi and Coke trying to get people to consume their soft drinks in the morning." Fingos were "lightly sweetened" and were released in one-serving bags or in boxes with the flavors being honey toasted oat and cinnamon. Each piece was "bigger than corn flakes but smaller than potato chips."

Consumers were confused by the marketing concept when Fingos were released due to it being advertised as a snack despite being in the cereal section. Fingos were unsuccessful and were discontinued in 1994.

== Advertising ==
The packaging for Fingos stated it was cereal and that it contained a similar number of calories to other breakfast cereal. Its packaging has "a wide grin depicting a person about to consume Fingos." General Mills had focus groups, in which 1% of the group ate the cereal with milk. The company spent $34 million to advertise the cereal in 1993 and Multi-Grain Cheerios received similar treatment in 1992. Posters were hung up in 32 large cities. In order to have Fingos be kept secret from its competitors, General Mills used in-home research instead of releasing the cereal in test markets.

Comedian Steve Mackall voiced the cereal box in television commercials and he based the voice off Robin Williams as the genie in the 1992 film Aladdin. The commercials were 15 or 30 seconds long and they were animated by Kurtz & Friends. The box in the commercials would say, "How wholesome am I?" and "Read my hips" while showing the cereal's nutritional information.

== See also ==
- List of breakfast cereals
- List of snack foods
