= Jeff DeGrandis =

American animator

Jeff DeGrandis is an American animator, director, and producer. Jeff has served as supervising producer on Dora the Explorer, Go, Diego, Go! and Ni Hao, Kai-Lan, and executive producer at Warner Bros. Animation on Dorothy and the Wizard of Oz. In 2008, he produced, directed, voice directed, and created The Finster Finster Show! short for Random! Cartoons and voiced Chicken #1. He's had 5 Emmy Nominations, Peabody Award, and won 2 Imagine Awards.

== Early life ==
Born and raised in Colts Neck, New Jersey, DeGrandis studied animation at the California Institute of the Arts. Prior to entering CalArts, he graduated from Christian Brothers Academy and Monmouth University. DeGrandis got his first big break working on Chuck Jones' segment on the 1992 movie Stay Tuned, and his first television animation work was on The Ren & Stimpy Show.

== Career ==
His other credits include God, the Devil and Bob (supervising producer & director), Toonsylvania (producer), The Shnookums & Meat Funny Cartoon Show (co-producer with Bill Kopp and director), Mad Jack the Pirate (director), Capertown Cops (director), Dexter's Laboratory (storyboard artist), Timon and Pumbaa (director), Mighty Ducks (timing director), Animaniacs (director), and The Patrick Star Show (storyboard supervisor).

DeGrandis also wrote, produced, storyboard designed and directed the 2001 animated direct to video film Timber Wolf.

In addition to his animation work, DeGrandis is also noted for his drawings of drag racing cars, which emulate the style of one of DeGrandis' early influences, Ed "Big Daddy" Roth. He has also been an active drag racer as well.

== The Finster Finster Show!: Store Wars ==
The Finster Finster Show! was created by DeGrandis when he was a student at CalArts, in 1982. He developed a short film based on the concept and even recorded the voices himself in 1983. While working as an executive producer to several Nickelodeon / Nick Jr. Channel productions, he pitched the idea to Nickelodeon and Frederator Studios for the "fourth season of Oh Yeah! Cartoons". They gave him the greenlight, he did the storyboards and scripts, and the voice recording was done exactly 23 years after the 1983 voice recording of the short film. The short aired in Random! Cartoons in 2008.
