= Bill Kopp =

American animator, writer and voice actor

- Born: William Kopp; Rockford, Illinois, U.S.
- Occupations: Animator; writer; voice actor
- Years active: 1981–present

William Kopp is an American animator, writer and voice actor.

== Career ==
Kopp studied animation at the California Institute of the Arts. In 1984, he won a Merit Award from the Student Academy Awards for Mr. Gloom. In 1985, he won a Student Academy Award for Observational Hazard.

Kopp animated the Whammy on the 1980s game show Press Your Luck and voiced the title character on Fox's Eek! The Cat and Kutter in The Terrible Thunderlizards, which he created with Savage Steve Holland. He also voiced Tom in the Tom and Jerry films Tom and Jerry: Blast Off to Mars and Tom and Jerry: The Fast and the Furry.

He was an animator for The Tracey Ullman Show "The Simpsons" shorts, but left after one season.

Kopp created The Shnookums and Meat Funny Cartoon Show and Mad Jack the Pirate, worked as an executive producer and writer for Toonsylvania, produced and directed Tom and Jerry cartoons, wrote Hare and Loathing in Las Vegas and The Incredible Crash Dummies. Kopp worked on the story of the three Roger Rabbit Shorts, Tummy Trouble, Roller Coaster Rabbit, and Trail Mix-Up. He was also the writer/director/co-producer on Tales from the Crypt's series finale "The Third Pig".

He was the director of most episodes of The Twisted Whiskers Show.

Kopp is a regular on Cartoon Network's Mighty Magiswords providing the voice of Man Fish the Fish Man.

He currently resides in California.

== Filmography ==
=== Film ===
Year	Film	Role	Notes
1985	Jac Mac and Rad Boy Go!	Rad Boy	
1985	Better Off Dead		animator
1986	One Crazy Summer		character designer animation supervisor chief animator
1989	Tummy Trouble		story animator
1990	Roller Coaster Rabbit		story animator
1993	Trail Mix-Up		story (uncredited)
2005	Tom and Jerry: Blast Off to Mars	Tom, Jerry, Press Guy #1	writer director voice director voice actor
2005	Tom and Jerry: The Fast and the Furry	Tom, Frank	writer director voice director voice actor

=== Television ===
Year	Film	Role	Notes
1987	The Tracey Ullman Show		Storyboard Artist and Layout Artist (uncredited)
1991–1994	Taz-Mania		writer
1992–1997	Eek! The Cat	Eek, Pierre	creator writer narrator supervising producer voice actor
1994	The Baby Huey Show		creative director
1995	The Shnookums & Meat Funny Cartoon Show	Polite Coyote	creator writer producer voice director voice actor
1995–1997	The What-a-Cartoon! Show	Yuckie Duck	voice actor
1996	Tales from the Crypt		writer director animation director character designer storyboard artist Episode 7.13: "The Third Pig"
1998–1999	Toonsylvania		creator writer executive producer voice director
1998–1999	Mad Jack the Pirate	Mad Jack	creator writer executive producer casting director voice director voice actor
2001	Capertown Cops		writer
2002	House of Mouse		writer Episode 3.10: "Humphrey in the House"
2010	'Til Death	Dolphin, Whale	Episode 4.21: "The Wedding"
2010	The Twisted Whiskers Show	Mister Mewser, Jack	writer director voice actor
2011	Dan Vs.	Additional Voices	director
2012	1001 Nights		writer Episode 2.2a: "Bandits of Basra"
2015	Wabbit		writer Episode 1.7a: "White House Rabbit"
2016–2019	Mighty Magiswords	Man Fish the Fish Man, Eel, Boot, Monster Toupee, Centipede 1 & 2, Seaslug-Chan, Justin Bottlenose Posse Person 1, Vendor, Sea Sponge, Vortex Donut, Bear Claw, King Chilidonut, Jeff, Dino	voice actor
2019	Amphibia	Marnie	Episode 1.16: "Bizarre Bazaar"
