= The Adventures of Hyperman (video game) =

1995 video game

- Developer: Illumina Productions
- Publisher: IBM
- Platform: Windows
- Release: 1995

The Adventures of Hyperman is a 1995 video game from Illumina Productions.

== Gameplay ==
The Adventures of Hyperman is a game in which players assist Hyperman and Emma C. Squared in locating scientific objects favored by the villain Entrobe. These objects are placed into a containment warp field to lure Entrobe and his sidekick Kid Chaos back into captivity. The game provides access to Emma’s laboratory, where players use scientific tools such as a simulation terrarium to observe environmental effects and an electron microscope for examining materials. Certain sequences require operating devices like a catapult used to launch Hyperman toward a castle. To activate it, players determine the correct relationship between weight, velocity, and angle to achieve the intended trajectory.

== Reception ==
Reception

Review scores
Publication	Score
Dimension 3	97%
Electronic Entertainment	3/5
Evansville Courier and Press	2.5/4

CNET said "Hyperman isn't as funny as The Tick, and it's hard to imagine youngsters giving up their favorite Saturday morning cartoons to learn about science".

Computer Game Review said "This will appeal to kids because of its very well done cartoon graphics style and excellent sound effects".

== Television series ==
A television series based on the game premiered in 1995.
