= Toonsylvania =

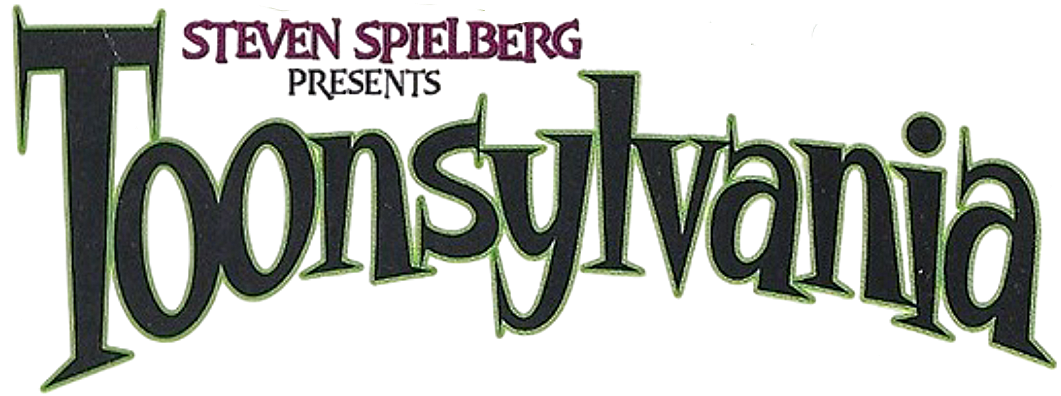
- Genre: Horror comedy Anthology
- Created by: Bill Kopp; Mike Peters ("Night of the Living Fred" segments); Chris Otsuki ("Melissa Screetch" segments)
- Directed by: Jeff DeGrandis; Rich Arons; Dave Marshall; Charlie Bean
- Voices of: Nancy Cartwright; Jim Cummings; Matt Frewer; Brad Garrett; Jess Harnell; Jonathan Harris; Tom Kenny; Wayne Knight; Valery Pappas; Paul Rugg; Kath Soucie; David Warner; Billy West
- Theme music composer: Julie Bernstein; Steven Bernstein; Paul Rugg
- Composers: Michael Tavera; John Given; Christopher Klatman; Thom Sharp; Carl Johnson; Nathan Wang; Christopher Neil Nelson; Gordon Goodwin; Cameron Patrick; Jonathan Green; Charles Fernandez; Billy Martin
- Country of origin: United States
- Original language: English
- No. of seasons: 2
- No. of episodes: 21 (whole); 82 (segments)

Production
- Executive producers: Bill Kopp; Rich Arons; Steven Spielberg
- Producer: Jeff DeGrandis
- Running time: 30 minutes
- Production company: DreamWorks Television Animation

Original release
- Network: Fox Kids
- Release: February 7, 1998 – January 18, 1999

Toonsylvania is an American animated television series, which ran for two seasons in 1998 on the Fox Kids Network block (usually placed in a block called "The No Yell Motel" that contained other scary kids' shows such as Goosebumps and Eerie, Indiana) in its first season, then was moved to Monday afternoons from September 14, 1998, until January 18, 1999, when it was cancelled. It was executive produced in part by Steven Spielberg, as DreamWorks' first animated series.

The show had recurring cartoon series that appeared in each episode. Unlike Animaniacs, Toonsylvania did not have a wide range of characters and almost every episode had the same component segments. The main segments were "Frankenstein", "Night of the Living Fred" (most episodes from season 1), "Attack of the Killer B Movies" (some episodes from season 1), "Igor's Science Minute", and "Melissa Screetch's Morbid Morals".

== Plot summary ==
=== Frankenstein ===
A typical episode of Toonsylvania starts with a cartoon series called "Frankenstein" (a parody of Mary Shelley's novel of the same name) about the adventures of Dr. Vic Frankenstein (voiced by David Warner), his assistant Igor (voiced by Wayne Knight) who always sets out to prove that he is a genius like his master, and their dim-witted Frankenstein Monster known as Phil (voiced by Brad Garrett).

During the season two restructuring, Igor, Dr. Vic Frankenstein and Phil interact with a variety of new characters, including a snooping next-door neighbor Seth Tuber (voiced by Jonathan Harris), who was based on Norman Bates from Psycho. He interacted with his "immobile" mother by putting his hand over his mouth and talking into it. There was also a typical Transylvanian angry mob that was, in fact, a cheerful group of Beatles-esque hipsters. Most of these new characters were voiced by Paul Rugg, who also improvised many of their lines.

=== Remote control gags ===
Before the second cartoon, there is an animated vignette where Igor is on the couch with Phil and tries to use the remote control, only for a problem to occur (a running gag akin to the couch gags seen on The Simpsons) before the TV turns on to show the cartoon in question.

=== Night of the Living Fred ===
A segment about a family of zombies that consists of Fred Deadman (voiced by Billy West), his sister Ashley Deadman (voiced by Kath Soucie), his mother Stiffany Deadman (voiced by Valery Pappas), and his father Dedgar Deadman (voiced by Matt Frewer in season one, Jess Harnell in season two). This segment was created by cartoonist Mike Peters.

=== Attack of the Killer B-Movies ===
Sometimes, a parody of a B-list horror movie would air instead of a "Night of the Living Fred" cartoon. Most of them involve Ace Deuce (voiced by Tom Kenny), Professor Man (voiced by Billy West), Professor Man's daughter (voiced by Valery Pappas) whose name and occupation keeps getting changed, Ace's friend Newark (voiced by Billy West), and the general (voiced by Jim Cummings) of an army fighting different monstrous threats.

=== Igor's Science Minute ===
A short segment where Igor gives a science lesson (be it a song or spoken piece) that always ends in disaster.

=== Melissa Screetch ===
When Phil does something bad, Igor punishes him by reading a horror tale from the book "Melissa Screetch's Morbid Morals". It involves a bratty girl named Melissa Screetch (voiced by Nancy Cartwright) who does not heed the warnings of adults like her mother and suffers the consequences for it one way or another. After the story is told, something tied in with the story happens with Igor and Phil. The segment was created by Chris Otsuki.

During season two, Melissa Screetch starred in a new segment called "The Melissa Screetch Show". Whenever Melissa was disappointed with a friend or a family member, she would go home and cover herself under her bed sheets where she pretended to host a show. She then had her transgressor on as a guest star and often did away with them in an ironic manner.

== Production ==
=== Second season changes ===
In season two, Bill Kopp and Jeff DeGrandis left the show and were replaced by Paul Rugg. The series' format changed into more of a sitcom style.

The backup segments to re-materialize in season two were the B-movie parodies, some "Night of the Living Fred" installments, and Melissa Screetch in a new segment called "The Melissa Screetch Show".

== Series overview ==
Season	Segments	Episodes	Originally released	
Season	Segments	Episodes	First released	Last released
1	53	13	February 7, 1998	September 21, 1998
2	29	8	October 26, 1998	January 18, 1999

== Episodes ==
=== Season 1 (1998) ===
Note: All episodes in this season were directed by Jeff DeGrandis.

No. overall	No. in season	Title	Written by	Storyboard by	Original release date	Prod. code
1	1	"Darla Doily – Demon Doll" "The Importance of Being Urnie" "Clone or Be Cloned" "The Boogeyman'll Get You, Melissa"	Bill Kopp Vinny Montello & Steve Ochs Chris Otsuki	Ken Laramay Chris Otsuki Melissa Suber Mark Zoeller	February 7, 1998	101
"Darla Doily – Demon Doll": Igor buys Phil the Monster a doll bent on murdering its owners. "The Importance of Being Urnie": Zombie kids Fred and Ashley Deadman track down their Uncle Urnie after he gets mixed up with a bag of cash during a bank robbery. "Clone of Be Cloned": Igor teaches viewers the process and consequences of cloning as he tries to make some playmates for Phil. "The Bogeyman'll Get You, Melissa": After staying out too late, Melissa Screetch must come home or face the Boogeyman.
2	2	"Blind Date of Frankenstein" "Football...and Other Body Parts" "Helium and Hot Air Balloons" "Stop Making Ugly Faces"	Bill Kopp Mike Peters & Karl Toerge Chris Otsuki	Ken Laramay, Mr. Lawrence, Chris Otsuki, Bill Riling, Mike Sosnowski, Melissa Suber & Mark Zoeller	February 14, 1998	102
"Blind Date of Frankenstein": On advice from his reflection (who represents his successful self), Igor builds a girlfriend for his arrogant master Dr. Vic Frankenstein. "Football...and Other Body Parts": Fred and Ashley must prove their worth during a school football game. "Helium and Hot Air Balloons": Igor inflates Phil as part of his lesson about air displacement and how helium is the lightest element on the periodic table. "Stop Making Ugly Faces": Melissa Screetch's habit of making ugly faces curses her to a life of playing B-movie monsters when one of her ugly faces sticks.
3	3	"Love Potion Number Nein" "Attack of the Iguana People" "The Big Bang" "Teeth for Two"	Bill Kopp Vinny Montello & Steve Ochs Chris Otsuki	Ken Laramay Chris Otsuki Melissa Suber Mark Zoeller	February 21, 1998	103
"Love Potion Number Nein": Igor steals Dr. Vic's love potion and uses it as a perfume for Natalie Nightshade, a once-famous Hollywood actress who now haunts the castle. The potion however has a dangerous side effect that may cost Igor his life. "Attack of the Iguana People": A monster movie parody where Mr. Big's minion Fez Rococco kidnaps Professor Man for a growth serum that a giant insect created during the struggle. Ace Deuce, Professor Man's daughter, and Newark must lure the giant insect to the volcano while working to rescue Professor Man. "The Big Bang": Igor traps Phil inside a giant popcorn machine as part of his lesson on the big bang theory. "Teeth for Two": Melissa Screetch incurs the wrath of the tooth fairy after refusing to give half of her tooth fairy money to her brother Kyle.
4	4	"Baby Human" "Earth vs. Everything" "Igor's Science Minute: Blunder and Lightning" "Little Screetchin' Riding Hood"	Bill Kopp Chris Otsuki	Joe Horne, Ken Laramay, Chris Otsuki; Bill Riling, Mark Rubinchik & Melissa Suber	February 28, 1998	104
"Baby Human": Igor creates a humanoid baby with an insatiable appetite "Earth vs. Everything": A B-movie parody in which a monster known as "Everything" plots to rule the world as it is consisted of a literal "abominable snowman", a swarm of giant ants, and a group of UFOs. It's up to Ace Deuce and Professor Man's daughter to stop the "Everything". "Blunder and Lightning": Igor teaches viewers about lightning, but cannot stop getting struck by it. "Little Screetchin' Riding Hood": A musical take on Little Red Riding Hood starring Melissa Screetch torturing the Big Bad Wolf.
5	5	"Built for Speed" "Captain Beaumarchais' Fish Flakes" "A Kiss Before Dying" "Gravity" "Go Stand in the Corner, Young Lady"	Story by : Frank Santopadre; Teleplay by : Vinny Montello & Steve Ochs Mike Peters & Tracy Peters Chris Otsuki	Mr. Lawrence Bob Onorato Chris Otsuki Mike Sosnowski	March 7, 1998	105
"Built for Speed": While on his way to a mad scientists' potluck, Dr. Vic learns that his rival (now reduced to a head after eating Vic's nine-alarm chili) booby-trapped his car to explode if it gets below 60 miles per hour. "Captain Beaumarchais' Fish Flakes": A short commercial parody for a breakfast cereal made of fish. "A Kiss Before Dying": Ashley sets up a kissing booth at the school carnival while Fred tries to go on The Twirl 'n Hurl. "Gravity": Igor pushes Phil off the Eiffel Tower in this warped lesson on gravity. "Go Stand in the Corner, Young Lady": Melissa Screetch gets her teacher fired for making her stand in the corner as a punishment for talking during class.
6	6	"Spawn of Santa" "Dead Hard" "Periodic Table of Elements" "Don't Swallow the Seeds, Silly"	Martin Olson Bill Kopp, Vinny Montello & Steve Ochs Keith Baxter Chris Otsuki	Mr. Lawrence, Chris Otsuki, Bill Riling, Mark Rubinchik & Mike Sosnowski	March 14, 1998	106
"Spawn of Santa": In this twisted Christmas episode, Dr. Vic switches Santa Claus' brain with the brain of a bank robber named Debbie. "Dead Hard": Fred is sentenced to overnight detention and must escape by traveling through the school's air vent to save his date for the school dance from the school bully. "Periodic Table of Elements": Igor sings about the periodic table. "Don't Swallow the Seeds, Silly": Melissa swallows watermelon seeds which grow inside her and turn her into a freak.
7	7	"Doom With a View" "Dead Dog Day Afternoon" "Evolution and the Attorney" "Here There Be Monsters"	Vinny Montello & Steve Ochs Bill Kopp Keith Baxter Chris Otsuki	Joe Horne, Ken Laramay; Bill Riling, Mark Rubinchik, Melissa Suber & Mark Zoeller	March 28, 1998	107
"Doom with a View": Mr. Death wants to go on vacation and stays at the castle (which Igor and Phil set up as a bed and breakfast while Dr. Vic was gone), but Igor and Phil's antics get on Mr. Death's nerves and Dr. Vic (who came back early and thinks he's terminally ill) thinks Mr. Death is after him personally. "Dead Dog Day Afternoon": Fred takes his dead dog to a dog show. "Evolution and the Attorney": Igor sings about the evolution of man. "Here There Be Monsters": While in school, Melissa Screetch fantasizes her own tale about Christopher Columbus and his exploration of America which includes a hungry sea monster.
8	8	"Love Hurts" "One for Mall and Mall for One" "The Brain" "Plain as the Nose on Your Face"	Bill Kopp, Vinny Montello & Steve Ochs Vinny Montello, Steve Ochs & Mike Peters Keith Baxter Chris Otsuki	Mr. Lawrence Chris Otsuki Mike Sosnowski Mark Zoeller	April 4, 1998	108
"Love Hurts": Igor, Dr. Vic, and Phil appear on a Dating Game-style game show called "Love Hurts" where Dr. Vic keeps getting injured during the physical challenges. "One for Mall and Mall for One": The Deadmans head to the mall for a family photo, where Stiffany gets her hair done, Ashley gets her ears pierced, Fred tries to win a video game at the arcade, and Dedgar is roped into donating blood (which he doesn't have because he's dead) after seeing a plate of free cookies on a counter. "The Brain": Igor literally picks Phil's brain during a song about the organ. "Plain as the Nose on Your Face": Melissa comes down with a serious case of Pinocchio nose when she lies to her mother.
9	9	"Phil Feel Smart" "Voodoo Vacation" "The Universe" "Melissa, Don't Spoil Your Appetite"	Martin Olson Bill Kopp Keith Baxter Chris Otsuki	Mr. Lawrence Bill Riling Mark Zoeller	April 25, 1998	109
"Phil Feel Smart": Phil ingests all the chemicals in the lab to wash out the taste of the five-alarm chili Igor made and suddenly becomes the smartest person in the world which Igor and Dr. Vic want to exploit for their own benefits. "Voodoo Vacation": The Deadmans vacation in Hawaii where they are mistaken for an ancient god. "The Universe": Igor sings about the universe. "Melissa, Don't Spoil Your Appetite": Melissa's candy-binging causes her to waste away from not eating real food.
10	10	"WereGranny" "The Lobster of Party Beach" "Luck Is Not a Factor" "The Screetchy Little Mermaid"	Vinny Montello & Steve Ochs Bill Kopp Chris Otsuki	Ken Laramay Chris Otsuki Mike Sosnowski Melissa Suber	May 2, 1998	110
"WereGranny": Dr. Vic's grandmother comes to visit, and Igor thinks Phil accidentally spiking her tea with wolfsbane which turns her into a werewolf whenever she sees the full moon anywhere or hears the word moon. "The Lobster of Party Beach": A B-movie parody about a lobster monster mutated from leftover nuclear waste ruining a teen beach party that Ace Deuce, Professor Man's daughter, and their friend Newark are attending. "Luck is Not a Factor": Igor teaches viewers about the scientific reasonings behind luck. "The Screetchy Little Mermaid: In this musical parody of "The Little Mermaid", Melissa Screetch is an obnoxious mermaid bent on revenge against the prince who rejected her and enlists a sea witch's help where her potion works too well on the prince.
11	11	"Family Plot" "A Zombie is Born" "Earthquake Boogie" "Melissa and the Three Bears"	Martin Olson Martin Olson & Mike Peters Keith Baxter Chris Otsuki	Chris Otsuki Bill Riling Mark Rubinchik Mike Sosnowski	May 16, 1998	111
"Family Plot": Igor resurrects Dr. Vic's ex-wife and her family. "A Zombie is Born": Fred and Ashley sign up for the school talent show. "Earthquake Boogie": Igor sings an Elvis Presley-inspired song about earthquakes. "Melissa and the Three Bears": Melissa Screetch harasses the Three Bears by destroying their property. So, it's a battle between the Three Bears and Melissa over their rightful place in the household at the end, they tie her up and put her back to where they found her and she ends up doing the same thing to the Three Little Pigs as their new victims.
12	12	"Phil's Brain" "Jurassic Putt" "Bites and Stings" "You Keep Bouncing Like That, You're Gonna Hurt Yourself"	Martin Olson Keith Baxter Chris Otsuki	Ken Laramay, Mr. Lawrence, Bill Riling, Melissa Suber & Mark Zoeller	September 14, 1998	112
"Phil's Brain": Igor tries to get Phil's brain to help him out with taking out the trash—but Phil's brain is lonely and wants a bride. "Jurassic Putt": Fred goes on a mini-golf date with a Goth girl. "Bites and Stings": Igor sings about the effects of bites and stings to the tune of "My Favorite Things" from The Sound of Music. "You Keep Bouncing Like That, You're Gonna hurt Yourself": Melissa Screetch's excessive couch bouncing sends her into outer space.
13	13	"The Inferior Decorator" "Bang!" "Igor's Science Minute: Parasites" "Melissa Screetch's Morbid Morals: Melissa Screetch, Earth Ambassador"	Keith Baxter Martin Olson Keith Baxter Chris Otsuki	Ken Laramay, Mr. Lawrence, Chris Otsuki, Bill Riling, Mike Sosnowski & Melissa Suber	September 21, 1998	113
"The Inferior Decorator": Dr. Vic forces a tired Igor into remodeling his bedroom and Igor replaces Phil's brain with the brain of an interior decorator. "Bang!": The Deadmans meet their new human neighbors at a barbecue. "Parasites": Igor sings about how having a parasite for a pet is cheaper than a real animal. "Melissa Screetch, Earth Ambassador": A field trip to NASA leads to an alien invasion thanks to Melissa Screetch's meddling with the aliens after she hijacked a rocket and landed on their planet.

=== Season 2 (1998–99) ===
No. overall	No. in season	Title	Original release date
14	1	"Something Weenie This Way Comes" "Ideadical Cousins" "Melisserella"	October 26, 1998
"Something Weenie This Way Comes": After discovering that they are broke, Dr. Vic and Igor take jobs at Weenie on a Twig while Phil is mistaken for a video game at the local arcade. "Ideadical Cousins": Fred and Ashley Deadman play with their French cousin who wants to get rid of Ashley and live her life "Melisserella": Melisserella is a lazy, nasty girl in this boogie-woogie take on the classic tale Cinderella.
15	2	"Igor's Replacement" "The Deadman Bunch"	November 9, 1998
"Igor's Replacement": Igor gets a new job with a different mad scientist Dr. Weirdlove, Dr. Vic's rival scientist after Dr. Vic refuses to give into his demands. However, little does Igor know that Weirdlove has plans in store for Igor. "The Deadman Bunch": A Brady Bunch parody starring the Deadmans.
16	3	"My Fair Monster" "The Nosey Face" "Shelf Of Brains"	November 16, 1998
"My Fair Monster": In this parody of My Fair Lady, Igor trains Phil to be the stand-out of the Westminster Monster show after Dr. Vic refuses to let him enter. "The Nosey Face": The angry villagers recite a poem about a stranger with a strange nose. "Shelf of Brains": Phil sings about the many brains he has in the lab and in his head.
17	4	"The Doomed Odyssey" "Attack of the Fifty Footed Woman" "Becki with an I"	November 23, 1998
"The Doomed Odyssey": A movie crew invades the castle and Igor, Dr. Vic, and Phil fight back. "Attack of the Fifty Footed Woman": A B-movie parody where a sleepy Western town called Schools is attacked by an overgrown woman with 50 feet after someone resembling Professor Man's daughter put their feet in a radioactive waste pool. It's up to Sheriff Ace Deuce and Deputy Newark to save Scholls from the Fifty-Footed Woman. "Becki with an I": Becki (the Weenie on a Twig supervisor from "Something Weenie This Way Comes") performs a piece on why she hates being on Toonsylvania.
18	5	"The Longest Day" "Take Us to Your Liter" "Escape from Wet Nurse Island"	December 7, 1998
"The Longest Day": Dr. Vic, Igor, and Phil endure a boring visit to the DMV after Dr. Vic gets a misprinted license plate. "Take Us to Your Liter": A B-movie parody in which aliens want America to switch over to the metric system. It's up to Ace Deuce and Newark to come up with a plan to defeat the aliens. "Escape from Wet Nurse Island": Melissa Screetch creates her own TV show where her babysitter is sent to an Alcatraz-style prison island.
19	6	"For Your Info-Mation" "In Or Out" "Melissa Makes A Wish" "Madame Olga's Lament"	December 21, 1998
"For Your Info-Mation": Dr. Vic sells his fountain of youth potion on an infomercial. "In Or Out": The Deadman kids are expelled for being dead. "Melissa Makes a Wish": On the night of her birthday, Melissa wishes for a Black Ops helicopter. After being declined by the Birthday Fairy, Melissa airs her latest TV show where she takes action by raiding a meeting of holiday figures in order to get her birthday wish fulfilled. "Madame Olga's Lament": Dr. Vic's maid Madame Olga sings about her secrets and dreams.
20	7	"Some Weird In Time" "Vittles With Vic" "Parents Opposed to Television Inappropriateness" "Toonsylvania Presents: Phil and Igor in "Don't Axe, Don't Tell" "News from Around the World" "A Man of No Importance" "Swamp Thingy"	January 4, 1999
"Some Weird in Time": Igor, Dr. Vic, and Phil go time-traveling after being fed up of following Dr. Vic's orders by alternating the timeline for himself as an all-powerful, mystic ruler. Therefore, Vic and Phil must stop Igor before he damages the space-time continuum. "Vittles with Vic": Dr. Vic hosts his own cooking segment. "Parents Opposed to Television Innappropriateness": A network censor with P.O.T.T.I (Parents Opposed To Television Inappropriateness) speaks out against the show's violent content. "Phil and Igor in Don't Axe, Don't Tell": An Igor/Phil segment gets toned down by the censor from the previous segment. "News from Around the World": A newsreel parody shows how the Deadman family changed history. "A Man of No Importance": An unknown extra points out the scenes he appears in on the show. "Swamp Thingy": A B-movie parody about a swamp monster who wants to go on vacation. When it ends up abducting Professor Man and Professor Man's daughter who were looking for the swamp monster, it's up to Ace Deuce and Newark (who is called Hoboken here) to rescue them.
21	8	"Cyranot" "Igor III" "Running of the Bullies" "Troop 664"	January 18, 1999
"Cyranot": Phil falls in love with a female monster, but Dr. Vic ends up stealing her. "Igor III": A parody of Shakespeare's Richard III has Igor as the protagonist. "Running of the Bullies": The Deadman kids fight back against their bullies. "Troop 664": Melissa Screetch's wilderness group gets lost in the woods.

== Music ==
The music for the series was written by Michael Tavera, Keith Baxter, Christopher Neal Nelson, John Paul Given, Christopher Klatman and Thom Sharp. The main title song was written by Steve Bernstein and Julie Bernstein with lyrics by Paul Rugg.

== Cast ==
- David Warner – Dr. Vic Frankenstein
- Wayne Knight – Igor, Igor's reflection
- Brad Garrett – Phil, Bunny Wunny (in "Melissa Screetch: Earth Ambassador"), Andromeda King (in "Melissa Screetch: Earth Ambassador"), various
- Nancy Cartwright – Melissa Screetch ("Melissa Screetch's Morbid Morals" and "The Melissa Screetch Show" segments)
- Jim Cummings – Army general ("Attack of the Killer B-Movies" segments), Coach ("Night of the Living Fred" segments), Mr. Big (in "Attack of the Iguana People"), Santa Claus (in "Spawn of Santa"), various
- Matt Frewer – Dedgar Deadman ("Night of the Living Fred" segments; season one)
- Jess Harnell – Dedgar Deadman ("Night of the Living Fred" segments; season two), Wink Dracula (in "Love Hurts"), Johnny Vermin (in "A Kiss Before Dying"), Igor's singing voice (in "The Periodic Table"), various
- Jonathan Harris – Seth Tuber (season two)
- Tom Kenny – Ace Deuce ("Attack of the Killer B-Movies" segments), various
- Valery Pappas – Stiffany Deadman ("Night of the Living Fred" segments), Professor Man's Daughter (Attack of the Killer B-Movies" segments), Melissa Screetch's mother ("Melissa Screetch's Morbid Morals" segments), various
- Paul Rugg – Seth Tuber's mom (season two), various
- Kath Soucie – Ashley Deadman ("Night of the Living Fred" segments), Mrs. Screetch ("Melissa Screetch's Morbid Morals" segments), Kyle Screetch ("Melissa Screetch's Morbid Morals" segments), Female Tooth Fairy (in "Teeth for Two"), Andromeda Queen (in "Melissa Screetch: Earth Ambassador")
- Billy West – Fred Deadman ("Night of the Living Fred" segments), Newark/Hoboken ("Attack of the Killer B-Movies" segments), Toy Store Clerk/Mall Clerk (inn "Darla Doiley: Demon Doll" and "Spawn of Santa"), Male Tooth Fairy (in "Teeth for Two"), Dr. Earl Schwartzberg (in "Built For Speed"), various

=== Additional voices ===
- Charlie Adler – Customer (on "Darla Doiley: Demon Doll"), Dr. Vic's grandmother (in "WereGranny"), various
- Steve Bean -
- Jocelyn Blue – Mama Bear (in "Melissa and the Three Bears"), Gertrude (in "Family Plot")
- Corey Burton – Mr. Death (in "Doom With a View"), Debbie the bank robber (in "Spawn of Santa")
- Cam Clarke – Waiter (in "Blind Date of Frankenstein")
- Kate Donahue –
- Sandy Fox – Darla Doiley (in "Darla Doiley: Demon Doll"), Baby Bear (in "Melissa and the Three Bears"), various
- Josh Gilbert
- Bill Kopp – various
- Vince Montello –
- Byrne Offutt –
- April Winchell – Liz (in "Love Hurts")

== Crew ==
- Bill Kopp – Executive Producer, Writer ("B-Movie"), Creator, Voice Director (season one)
- Jeff DeGrandis – Producer, Director
- Steven Spielberg – Executive Producer
- Keith Baxter – Writer ("The Inferior Decorator"; also credited for lyrics for musical episodes of "Igor's Science Minute" and co-credited with Christopher Neil Nelson for music in "Igor's Science Minute")
- Kate Donahue – Voice Director (season two)
- Lee Mendelson – Creative Consultant ("Night of the Living Fred")
- Chris Otsuki – Creator ("Melissa Screetch"), Writer ("Igor's Science Minute" and "Melissa Screetch's Morbid Morals")
- Mike Peters – Creator ("Night of the Living Fred"), Writer ("Night of the Living Fred": "Football...and Other Body Parts", "A Kiss Before Dying" [co-written with Tracy Peters], "A Zombie is Born" [co-written with Martin Olson], and "Mall for One and One For Mall" [co-written by Vinny Montello and Steve Ochs])
- Kris Zimmerman - Voice Casting

== Home media releases ==
On August 31, 1999, a VHS cassette of Toonsylvania was released, which contained selected episodes. The episodes seen were "Darla Doiley, Demon Doll", "Voodoo Vacation", "Baby Human", "Dead Dog Day Afternoon", "Igor's Science Minute" ("Clone or Be Cloned", "The Brain", "Earthquake Boogie", and "Gravity and the Eiffel Tower"), "Melissa Screetch's Morbid Morals" ("The Boogeyman", "Stop Making Ugly Faces", "Here There Be Monsters", and "Melissa Screetch: Earth Ambassador"), "Phil's Brain", "Football...and Other Body Parts", "Bang!", and "WereGranny".

In 2014, Netflix in Latin America streamed the entire series.

== Video game ==
A Toonsylvania video game was developed by RFX Interactive and released by Light & Shadow Production and Ubi Soft for the Game Boy Color in 2000. The game was one of a number of Ubi Soft games for the platform that utilized the "Ubi Key" feature, allowing players to share data between games via the system's infrared port and unlock extra content.

== Merchandise ==
Toonsylvania action figures and playsets were developed by Pangea Corporation and released by Toy Island. Burger King distributed toys based on Toonsylvania in their kids' meals for a short period of time.

== See also ==
- The Hilarious House of Frightenstein
