= List of Eek! The Cat episodes =

This is a list of episodes of the animated series Eek! The Cat and includes The Terrible Thunderlizards and Klutter! segments.

The first season of the show was broadcast on the now-defunct Fox Kids block in 1992 as Eek! The Cat and consisted of thirteen 20-minute episodes featuring Eek! The Cat.

For the second season in 1993, the show format was changed to consist of two nine-minute segments, Eek! the Cat and The Terrible Thunderlizards. When The Terrible Thunderlizards premiered, the series' title was changed to Eek! And The Terrible Thunderlizards. In the third season in 1994, the name was changed to Eek! Stravaganza, retaining the same format used in the second season.

In the fourth season broadcast in 1995, a new segment titled Klutter was added, rotating with Eek! and the Thunderlizards. The fifth season commenced broadcast in September 1996, with no new Klutter segments being produced. Fox Kids temporarily ceased airing new premieres of the series in late October, with the final episodes being released in the summer of 1997.

== Series overview ==
Season	Episodes	Originally released	
Season	Episodes	First released	Last released
1	13	September 12, 1992	December 26, 1992
2	17	September 25, 1993	February 26, 1994
3	14	September 10, 1994	July 8, 1995
4	18	September 9, 1995	February 16, 1996
5	13	September 9, 1996	August 1, 1997

== Episodes ==
=== Season 1 (1992) ===
The first season is titled Eek! The Cat and only consisted of episodes featuring the titular series.

No. overall	No. in season	Title	Written by	Original release date	Prod. code
1	1	"Misereek"	Savage Steve Holland & Bill Kopp	September 12, 1992	EC-01
Eek is desperate for something to eat, so he swaps places with Mittens the Cat next door who is owned by a partially blind and deaf old lady. However, after she takes Eek to the zoo mistaking it for the vet, he has a series of painful misadventures with the animals. Eventually, he returns to his family who really missed him.
2	2	"Bearz N' the Hood"	Savage Steve Holland & Bill Kopp	September 19, 1992	EC-02
Eek goes to the mall to get an autograph from the Squishy Bearz for Wendy Elizabeth. The Rat Pack show up impersonating the Bearz and steal the mayor's statue, holding it for ransom. Eek manages to save the statue and clear the Squishy Bearz name.
3	3	"Catsanova"	Savage Steve Holland & Bill Kopp	September 26, 1992	EC-03
To earn his second wing, a one-winged Cupid suggests Eek fall in love with his lonely new neighbour, Annabelle. However, Annabelle's aggressive guard dog Sharky stands between the two. After many failed attempts, Cupid finally succeeds in uniting them and true love triumphs. Guest appearance: Buck Henry as Cupid.
4	4	"Eek vs. the Flying Saucers"	Savage Steve Holland & Bill Kopp	October 3, 1992	EC-04
Eek encounters a friendly alien pretending to need help for his school project about Earth. The alien is actually a hideous monster named Zoltar who kidnaps Annabelle in order to power a laser that can destroy Earth. Eek hides aboard an experimental space rocket and saves both Annabelle and the Earth.
5	5	"Cape Fur"	Savage Steve Holland & Bill Kopp	October 17, 1992	EC-06
Eek rescues a cute bunny and Wendy Elizabeth and J.B. bring it into the house, but the mischievous bunny gets Eek into trouble and the family throws him out. Eek discovers the bunny is an evil psycho rabbit wearing a cute costume who is trying to kill and rob the family, but he manages to save them from a ticking time bomb. The title is a spoof of Cape Fear. Guest appearance: Phil Hartman as Psycho Bunny.
6	6	"HallowEek"	Savage Steve Holland & Bill Kopp	October 31, 1992	EC-05
On Halloween, Eek becomes separated from J.B and Wendy Elizabeth during trick or treating. At a cemetery, he encounters a lost ghost called Crypty and offers to help him find his ghostly family before midnight. Meanwhile, a pretty witch with a talking pet cat plans to capture all the ghosts and traps J.B and Elizabeth to complete her spell. Eek manages to rescue the ghosts, defeat the witch, and the children from her clutches. Guest appearance: Kimberley Kates as the Witch
7	7	"Eek's International Adventure"	Savage Steve Holland & Bill Kopp	November 14, 1992	EC-08
Eek and his family go on a trip to visit Uncle Vic in Idaho. On the plane, Eek is mistaken for a secret agent called "The Cat" by a sultry enemy spy named Sasha. Both are captured by the notorious Brain, but they escape and put a stop to the Brain's evil plot. Guest appearance: Kurtwood Smith as Brain
8	8	"HawaiiEek 5-0"	Savage Steve Holland & Bill Kopp	November 21, 1992	EC-07
Annabelle falls in her swimming pool so Eek calls in the famous undersea explorer Jacques L'Duck to save her, but their underwater submersible is attacked by Sharky. Annabelle, Eek and Jacques are sucked down the plughole and emerge on a tropical island populated by natives who make Annabelle their queen. When they prepare to sacrifice her, Eek comes to her rescue.
9	9	"Great Balls of Fur"	Savage Steve Holland & Bill Kopp	November 28, 1992	EC-09
Melvis the Cat's singing career is fading, so he fakes his death and drops out. His desperate manager then tricks Eek into acting as Melvis to clinch a lucrative sponsorship deal. Eek's idiosyncratic performance boosts Melvis' popularity again so he decides to make a comeback, much to Eek's relief.
10	10	"The Whining Pirates of Tortuga"	Savage Steve Holland & Bill Kopp	December 5, 1992	EC-10
Sharky chases Eek's neighbor kitten friends Mushi, Cushi, and Ed up a tree. While they wait for Sharky to leave, Eek tells them about his adventures in which he encountered the "whining pirates" and led a treasure hunt. Eek and the pirates suffered many perils together on a tropical island, but eventually found the lost treasure which was guarded by a huge pink dinosaur. When the dinosaur comes looking for his friend Eek, the kittens realize the story may be true.
11	11	"The Eekcidental Tourist"	Savage Steve Holland & Bill Kopp	December 12, 1992	EC-11
Because Wendy Elizabeth gets a "D" in geography, Mom takes the family on across the United States on an educational trip. Eek gets left behind in Washington, D.C., but hitches a ride with the Incredible Elmo to Niagara Falls. Eek frequently gets left behind and follows the family station wagon all the way to the Golden Gate Bridge and coincidentally prevents a breakout at Alcatraz. While they are in California, an earthquake sinks the rest of the US.
12	12	"It's a Wonderful Nine Lives"	Savage Steve Holland & Bill Kopp	December 19, 1992	EC-13
It is Christmas and when a package falls out of Santa's sleigh, Eek decides to deliver it to its rightful recipient, an orphan living in Dudd City. Eek has a number of painful mishaps while helping others along the way, but eventually delivers the present and receives his own gift in return: everyone wishing him a Merry Christmas. The episode's story is narrated and told in rhyme. Guest appearance: Tim Curry as the narrator.
13	13	"The Eeksterminator"	Savage Steve Holland & Bill Kopp	December 26, 1992	EC-12
Two hungry spiders move into Mom's spotless house on the day of Wendy Elizabeth's birthday. Eek gives her a termite farm, but then accidentally breaks the glass allowing the spiders to chase after the termites. A termite called Termee asks Eek for help to find the others, but Mom calls in an exterminator who uses a battlesuit with a likeness to The Terminator. All-out mayhem ensues involving Eek, Termee (now enlarged by radiation), the exterminator and Sharky, but everything is resolved by the time Wendy Elizabeth arrives home from school.

=== Season 2 (1993–94) ===
The second season is titled Eek! and The Terrible Thunderlizards' and includes The Terrible Thunderlizards with Eek episodes. In the following list, "TTL" indicates a Terrible Thunderlizards cartoon.

No. overall	No. in season	Title	Written by	Original release date	Prod. code
14	1	"Shark Therapy" "Speed FrEek"	Savage Steve Holland & Bill Kopp	September 25, 1993	EC-14a EC-16a
Eek accidentally runs over Sharky with a lawn mower, so he takes the injured dog to Dr. Elmo for treatment, but Eek's good intentions only cause Sharky more pain in a multitude of ways. Sharky eventually recovers enough to take his revenge on Eek.; Eek and Annabelle go to watch Elmo race against Dakota the Terribly Dysfunctional Turtle at the speedway, but Dakota's car collapses at the start and a fierce new challenger appears. Elmo runs in fear and tricks Eek into racing in his place, but together Elmo and Eek win the race when the challenger's car is accidentally destroyed.
15	2	"Rocketship to Jupiter" "Eek's Funny Thing That He Does"	Savage Steve Holland & Bill Kopp	October 2, 1993	EC-17a EC-15a
During a Squishy Bearz television episode, an A-6 Intruder plane is about to crash into the Bearz house. Later, Sharky knocks Eek unconscious and he dreams that he is in the Bearz' land of Toodlesnook. He saves the Bearz from perils but is then accidentally sent in Professor Wiggly's rocket ship towards the sun and begins to burn up, however he regains consciousness at the smell of smoking cat food.; J.B. and Wendy Elizabeth establish a lemonade stall to raise money to buy a Sladamese language cassette tape for Mom. When Eek gives the lemonade away to a mouse, his only source of replacement lemons is in Sharky's yard. After a series of misadventures trying to avoid Sharky, Eek ends up in the Patriotic Warriors boxing ring where he wins a Sladamese Language-a-Matic tape.
16	3	"Eekpocalypse Now!" "Eex Men"	Savage Steve Holland & Bill Kopp	October 9, 1993	EC-18a EC-22a
Eek tells a story about Sharky's disappearance up the McTropolis River. Eek journeys upriver accompanied by his kitty crew with help from Elmo and his airborne elk BBQ brigade. Eek eventually finds Sharky in a jungle temple, extremely overweight from eating more meat than ever in his life. The title is a parody of the film Apocalypse Now.; McTropolis is threatened by Garbage Man and his sidekick Drippy the Maggot, but the cowardly Superpersonman takes flight and gives his powerful cape and job to Eek. Garbage Man and Drippy perform some dastardly deeds around town, but Eek thwarts them with his super powers. Garbage Man eventually gives up and leaves town when Eek stands up to him.
17	4	"Quadrapedia" "Night on Squishy Mountain"	Savage Steve Holland & Bill Kopp	November 6, 1993	EC-21a EC-19a
Two witchy cats are envious of Annabelle's popularity and beauty, so they send the Rat Pack to kidnap her. Eek travels with the cowardly Brave Elmo to the castle where she is being held, but they are captured. Just as the witches' greedy lawyers are about to get their hands on the prisoners, Sharky arrives and attacks the villains.; Eek and his family go to the Squishy Mountain amusement park where Wendy Elizabeth, J.B. and Eek go on rides which give them more thrills than they bargained for. Meanwhile, Mom short-circuits an animatronic of park founder Hoyte Gunterkrust, which kidnaps her in revenge. Eek, the Squishy Bearz, and the real Gunterkrust soon come to her rescue.
18	5	"Star TrEek" "Eeking Out a Living"	Savage Steve Holland & Bill Kopp	November 13, 1993	EC-23a EC-20a
Captain Eek and the crew of the Starship Shoesuntied accidentally breach the Sharktarian Galaxy. Eek is attracted by a Green Space Babe, and lands on her planet with his companions Mr. Sock and Dr. Mittens. They are captured by Sharky, leader of the Sharktarians and destroyer of other peoples' stuff. However, the Space Babe rescues them and Elmo accidentally blows up the Sharktarian Battleship. The title is a parody of Star Trek: The Original Series.; During a chase in the garden, Eek accidentally breaks Annabelle's new garden fountain statue of herself. Eek and Sharky then try to find work through Elmo's employment agency to earn money for some glue, but none of the jobs work out for the pair. Although their final job results in painful injuries, they manage to get the glue and fix the statue, before it accidentally crashes to the ground.
19	6	"TTL: Meat the Thunderlizards" "The Great Eekscape"	Savage Steve Holland Savage Steve Holland & Bill Kopp	November 20, 1993	EC-14b EC-24a
The dinosaurs believe that mankind will lead them to the brink of extinction, so General Galapagos hauls Doc Tari, Daisy Kutter and Bo Diddly Squat out of prison to capture the two cavemen, Bill and Scooter. The cavemen's stupidity foils the Thunderlizards' every effort. Meanwhile, Bill and Scooter are captured by a young dinosaur called Huckleberry and placed in a terrarium.; Eek and Sharky are caught by dogcatchers, but on the way to the pound Eek loses their dog licenses. They cannot get bail, so they decide to dig their way out. Their tunnel brings them up in the least appropriate places, including the office of the sax-playing president. Eventually they gain their freedom and recover their wallets and licenses.
20	7	"TTL: The Lava My Life" "Eek Goes to the Hot Spot"	Savage Steve Holland & Bill Kopp	November 27, 1993	EC-16b EC-24b
The Thunderlizards chase Bill and Scooter to the X-Zone where the Thuggosaurs are holding the dinosaur president's daughter hostage. The Thunderlizards are caught by the Thuggosaurs, but Bill and Scooter manage to both free them and save the president's daughter.; Eek gets hit by a truck while evading Sharky and ends up in the afterlife, but while in line for judgment, Shifty the criminal cat hands Eek his file so that he can go to the bathroom resulting in Eek being banished to the "hot spot". Fido, ruler of the underworld, gives Eek enough tasks to ensure he stays for eternity but Eek quickly completes them. Eventually, angels come to rectify the error by dumping Shifty and reclaiming Eek, restoring his nine lives.
21	8	"TTL: Tar and Away"	Savage Steve Holland	December 4, 1993	EC-18b
Bill and Scooter discover a tar pit which Bill declares as useless. Meanwhile, the Thuggosaurs discover a crashed flying saucer and a bowling ball which they decide are useless. While trying to cool their burning feet, Bill and Scooter run into the saucer and encounter two aliens shaped like chairs who are in need of the very tar the two cavemen discovered so they can return home. At the end of the episode, the cavemen use the ball to invent a game they call "gowling".
22	9	"It's a Very Merry Eek's Mas"	Savage Steve Holland	December 5, 1993	EC-27
Christmas is approaching, but Santa's reindeer and elves have gone on strike due to their poor working conditions. To make matters worse, Santa slips and breaks his leg. Meanwhile, Sharky is depressed because he misses his own family so Eek offers to take him to Santa to grant him his wish where they meet Elmo the Brown-Nosed Reindeer who failed to obtain help for Santa. Because of the situation at the North Pole, Eek volunteers to finish making the toys and deliver all the presents himself. His effort fills everyone with the Christmas spirit, including the reindeer and elves. Eventually, Eek not only deliver the presents but also returns Sharky to his family. Guest appearances: Shane and Sia Barbi as themselves, Bobcat Goldthwait as Blitzen and William Shatner as Santa Claus.
23	10	"TTL: Always Eat Your Spinach"	Savage Steve Holland & Bill Kopp	December 18, 1993	EC-15b
Huckleberry's parents persuade him to set Bill and Scooter free, even though they would rather stay. They sneak back into the house so Huckleberry's mom calls a pest exterminator, but he is waylaid by the Thunderlizards who take his place to catch the humans. Amidst the chaos the Thunderlizards cause, Squatt creates a spinach monster with an enlarging spray intended for use on the humans.
24	11	"TTL: All About Babs"	Savage Steve Holland & Bill Kopp	January 1, 1994	EC-22b
Dinosaur scientists create a female human they call "Babs" (Bio-engineered Animated Biped Specimen) as a lure for Bill and Scooter so the Thunderlizards can trap them. However, the more intelligent Babs has her own agenda, as the Thunderlizards come under attack by Thuggosaurs.
25	12	"TTL: The Frying Game"	Savage Steve Holland & Bill Kopp	January 8, 1994	EC-21b
Bill and Scooter feel like they are frying to death as they cross a desert. Meanwhile, the Thunderlizards stumble into an underground facility where the Thuggosaurs have a missile aimed at Jurassic City. While the incompetent Thunderlizards try to stop the launch, the humans accidentally cause the entire facility to be destroyed.
26	13	"TTL: Ice Age Kapades" "TTL: Something's Abyss"	Savage Steve Holland & Bill Kopp	January 15, 1994	EC-20b EC-26a
Huckleberry runs away from home and finds Bill and Scooter in the jungle. Meanwhile, General Galapagos has new Ice Projection gun helicoptered in for the Thunderlizards but it lands near Huckleberry. Scooter believes it is a camera that will "freeze moments in time", and tests it on Bill, freezing him in a block of ice. Angry at Scooter, Bill hits the machine which goes out of control and triggers the beginning of the Ice Age.; While fighting, Bill and Scooter plunge down a ravine and find themselves in Doomsday Cavern. They are captured by subterranean slugs and face sinister torture when the slug princess decides to marry Bill. Meanwhile, the Thunderlizards make their way through the dangerous caverns and interrupt the ceremony, so Bill and Scooter seize the chance to escape.
27	14	"TTL: The Unbearable Lightness of Being Scooter" "TTL: Thundersaurus Wrecks"	Savage Steve Holland & Bill Kopp	January 22, 1994	EC-26b EC-17b
The Thunderlizards are sent to track down the humans with the tracking pittosaur Flechette. Meanwhile, the Thuggosaurs build a pterosaur-shaped dirigible bomber in order to attack Jurassic City. Scooter discovers the device but fills himself with helium, so just as the Thunderlizards arrive, Bill and Scooter escape by floating away. The Thuggosaurs capture the Thunderlizards but they turn the tables on their captors and prevent the attack from happening.; The Thunderlizards are hot on the trail of Bill and Scooter when Scooter saves a baby bat from falling. In gratitude, the mother bat gives Bill and Scooter a ride in the sky. The Thunderlizards pursue them in a pterosaur-shaped plane, but the bat outflies them causing them to crash.
28	15	"A Sharkwork Orange" "TTL: Let's Make a Wheel"	Savage Steve Holland & Bill Kopp	February 5, 1994	EC-25b EC-19b
Sharky's extreme anger and viciousness is becoming worse, so Eek takes him to Dr. Elmo for therapy. The psychotherapy on Sharky is successful, but his niceness becomes a liability to others and himself. Sharky snaps out of it when Eek causes a safe to fall on him.; When Bill tests Scooter's new wheel, he crashes into the Thunderlizards' secret pillbox. He ruins their attempt to fire the new Beehive Super Cannon at the humans and it lands on General Galapagos in the Jurassic Research Center instead. Bill also deflects their second missile attempt which lands on General Galapagos and his wife while they are picnicking.
29	16	"TTL: T-Rex, Lies, and Videotape"	Savage Steve Holland & Bill Kopp	February 19, 1994	EC-23b
While the Thunderlizards place surveillance cameras in the X-Zone to track the humans, they see the Thuggosaurs gathering flowers. The Thuggosaurs are filling them with explosives destined for Jurassic City, but the Thunderlizards sabotage their mission. Meanwhile, Scooter uses the cameras to invent the situation comedy and the footage of Bill being swallowed by a jungle slug becomes a hit on Jurassic City television.
30	17	"Mountain Groan"	Savage Steve Holland & Bill Kopp	February 26, 1994	EC-25a
Eek, Annabelle, Elmo and the Squishy Bearz go camping on Mount McTropolis, but plans change when Elmo encounters a Bigfoot. One by one, they are abducted by a mysterious character and the Bigfoot is the prime suspect, but Annabelle discovers that Sharky is the abductor because he was not invited on the trip.

=== Season 3 (1994–95) ===
For the third season the title was changed Eek! Stravaganza with Eek and Thunderlizards. "TTL" indicates a Thunderlizards cartoon.

No. overall	No. in season	Title	Written by	Original release date	Prod. code
31	1	"Paws" "In the Line of Fur"	Kati Rocky Savage Steve Holland	September 10, 1994	EC-28
Annabelle accidentally overfeeds her pet goldfish Bruce, who becomes huge and escapes. Eek finds Bruce in the backyard pool where Wendy Elizabeth has arranged a pool party. Eek, Sharky and Mittens work together to resolve the situation, and Eek cures Bruce when it swallows a pressurized can of squishy cream. The title is a parody of the film Jaws.; On a visit to the White House, Eek saves the President's cat Socks and is requested to protect him from a threatened kidnapping. The former President's dog Checkers, bitter at being embarrassed in a presidential speech captures Socks, but Eek rescues it, although Eek cannot save the dimwitted cat from harming itself.
32	2	"Chariots of Fur" "Honey I Shrunk the Cat"	Pamela Wick & Savage Steve Holland	September 17, 1994	EC-30
Eek and Annabelle prepare for a picnic while they watch Elmo partake in a long distance footrace. When Elmo sees the powerful Seymour the Sloth competing, Elmo substitutes Eek in his place. Elmo then tricks Sharky into chasing Eek. During the race, both Elmo and Sharky crash in to the women's Patriotic Warriors tag wrestling competition, upsetting Sharky's hero, Platinum. Elmo's ruse works and Eek wins the race and the prize money for Timmy.; Eek and Sharky visit scientist Professor Elmo at a military base, but they are struck by the ray of his shrinko machine and are reduced to the size of insects. They are pursued by various small predators but are saved by Winky the Dust Bunny Slayer. Shane and Sia Barbi help Elmo to fix the machine. After the President inhales a raisin, Eek and Sharky are shrunk again and sent through his sinuses to extract it. The title is a parody of Honey, I Shrunk the Kids and Winky is a caricature of Elvis Presley.; Guest appearances: Shane and Sia Barbi as themselves.
33	3	"Shark Doggy Dog" "Fatal Eektraction"	Savage Steve Holland Henry Gilroy	September 24, 1994	EC-29b EC-31a
When Don Cornelius sees Sharky choking on the sock, he takes a liking to the sound and makes him a rap star, but the postmen take Sharky to court over his aggressive behavior. Sharky's career is cut short after Eek slaps him on the back and he reguritates the sock. Musical references in this episode include Mice T as Ice T, Bearz to Men as Boyz II Men, George Clinton song Atomic Dog as "Shark Dog" and Snoop Dogg as Shark Doggy Dog singing "Mailman Biter".; Guest appearances: Don Cornelius and Chris Leary as themselves.: Alice, Eek's new highly possessive neighbor, is jealous of Annabelle. As Alice tries to dispose of Annabelle, Sharky becomes part of the collateral damage, but Alice eventually loses interest in Eek.; Guest appearance: Heather Locklear as Alice.
34	4	"The Good, the Bad and the Squishy" "TTL: Birth of a Notion"	Kati Rocky	October 8, 1994	EC-29a EC-37a
Eek tells Annabelle a wild west tale about the "Dog with No Name" who partners with Sheriff Eek to save the town of Hayfever from the Bandito Bearz. However, because guns cannot be shown in a children's cartoon, the showdown turns into a disco showdown. The title is a parody of Spaghetti Westerns.; Scooter invents Burpday as a celebration for Bill and makes a Burpday cake which becomes a painful experience for Bill. As a surprise, Babs joins them because she needs them to build a mini-mall. Meanwhile, the Thunderlizards plant a listening bug to spy on the humans who they think are developing explosives, but Scooter swallows it and the sound of his stomach rumblings frighten the dinosaurs. The celebration is cut short when Bill and Scooter accidentally destroy the mall and Babs storms off.
35	5	"Eek's SnEek PEek" "TTL: The Thunder Years"	Savage Steve Holland	October 15, 1994	EC-31b EC-37b
In the middle of filming an Eek! The Cat episode, Eek and the Squishy Bearz are stopped mid-scene. In the meantime, Eek gives a behind the scenes preview of the show's script writing, voicing and animation processes. At the test screening, Fox Kids executive Margaret Loesch suggests that Eek and Elmo are given complete makeovers to broaden their appeal.; Guest appearances: Margaret Loesch and Kati Rocky as themselves.: Scooter invents a ladder for Bill to collect fruit, but the rocket extension results in another painful experience for Bill and shoots down the Thunderlizards' Manta Scramjet. The Thunderlizards hide in cave within Thuggosaur territory and steal a Thuggosaur tank. When they drive it towards Jurassic City, the dinosaur army opens fire.
36	6	"The Eex Files" "TTL: The Hurting Show"	Savage Steve Holland	November 5, 1994	EC-32b EC-39a
Eek travels with his family to England, but he falls from the plane over the Nevada Desert and lands in Area 51 where he is mistaken for an alien specimen. Eek escapes from their deadly experiments with the aid of an alien who rides a bicycle up into the sky. The title is a parody of The X-Files.; Scooter invents a talk show but it does not cure Bill of his problems. Meanwhile, the Thunderlizards thwart a planned Thuggosaur train hijack. They save Mrs. Galapagos, who is so grateful that General Galapagos cannot fire them.
37	7	"Paw Sores" "TTL: T-Rex and Sympathy"	Savage Steve Holland	November 12, 1994	EC-33a EC-38a
After Sharky knocks Eek unconscious, Eek dreams that he as Leek Bottomsitter is on a mission with Elmo von Schmelmo to rescue Princess Layabout from Dark Lawyer and save the galaxy from the Mall of Doom. The title is a parody of Star Wars.; Mr. T-Rex is accompanying the Thunderlizards on their mission, while Bill and Scooter start growing plants in their "garden of eatin'". Mr. T-Rex proves to be ineffective as a leader and gets caught in a huge venus flytrap.; Guest appearance: Mr. T as Mr. T-Rex.
38	8	"The Eeksorcist" "TTL: Boo Thunder"	Paul Germain & Savage Steve Holland Savage Steve Holland	November 19, 1994	EC-32a EC-40b
While digging in a park's sandbox, Elmo finds Huggie the doll, but he breaks it, which unleashes its super joyful spirit. Huggie then possesses Sharky, making him unbearably cute and loveable. Elmo and Eek manage to manage to get Sharky to cough out Huggie, but then she possesses Elmo. The title is a parody of The Exorcist.; Scooter invents a scary mask, and Bill tries to scare the primates, but they are too smart to fall for his trick. Meanwhile, the Thunderlizards crash their Manta Scramjet and destroy their anti-gravity scooters but still manage to knock a Thuggosaur molten lava-covered war robot out of commission.
39	9	"Lord of the Fleas" "TTL: Postcards from the X-Zone"	Savage Steve Holland Kati Rocky	November 26, 1994	EC-34b EC-38b
Eek runs into Elmo who convinces him to look after some zoo penguins, but they abscond and head into a mall. After the mall closes, they start partying. When Eek tries to take them back, they refuse and Sharky leads them in an attack on Eek. Eventually, Elmo and the guards arrive to take control of the situation.; Bill and Scooter go on vacation after the Thunderlizards drop a stink bomb on their home. Meanwhile, the Thunderlizards foil a plan by the Thuggosaurs to release giggle gas from a float during the Fossil Day Festival and Parade in Jurassic City.
40	10	"Eekstremely Dull" "TTL: Planet of the Crepes"	Savage Steve Holland	February 4, 1995	EC-34a EC-39b
Eek looks forward to watching a Squishy Bearz movie, but is invited by his new neighbor, the squirrel Steven, to meet his family who have almost nothing to say. Eek finds the experience incredibly boring, especially their home movies. Eek eventually staggers out of their tree house but falls on Sharky. The angry Sharky bangs on Steven's door but receives his own taste of their mind-numbingly boring hospitality.; While the hungry Bill and Scooter get some fresh crepes from the primates, a lone astronaut crash lands on Earth after spending centuries cryogenically frozen in space. He is furious to find out how the primitive the humans have become. Meanwhile, the Thunderlizards stop a Thuggosaur submarine attack. The title is a parody of Planet of the Apes.
41	11	"Eeksy Rider" "A Sharkdog Day Afternoon"	Henry Gilroy & Savage Steve Holland Savage Steve Holland	February 18, 1995	EC-36b EC-33b
Sharky is captured by the dog catcher. Meanwhile, Eek goes off to fix the bell on Wendy Elizabeth's new wheelie bike before a bike race. He runs into Mittens and Sharky while cycling to the store, but they are then captured and also taken to the city pound. Eek, Sharky and Mittens are released and as they cycle back home, they pick up Elmo and win the bike-o-thon and all win prizes. The title is a parody of Easy Rider.; The Sharkenator robotic dog catcher arrives from the future and seeks to eliminate Sharky, but the sharkdog Tera from the canine resistance comes to his aid. However both the Sharkenator and Tera's missions turn out to be a wild goose chase when they discover that Sharky is the wrong target. This episode is a parody of The Terminator.
42	12	"Rebel Without the Claws" "TTL: Cromagnon Farce"	Savage Steve Holland	February 25, 1995	EC-35a EC-40a
While on the beach, Annabelle runs out of suntan lotion, so Eek and Sharky rush to her rescue in Sharky's hot rod with another bottle. Annabelle insists that Eek and Sharky spend some quality time together, but after a series of motoring mishaps, they end up in a demolition derby where they and Sharky's car are squashed into a cube. The title is a parody of the film Rebel without a Cause and features references to the Batman TV series and Batcave.; The Thunderlizards travel into space try to and locate the humans and destroy them with a laser ray, but two Thuggosaurs stow away on board and accidentally ruin the mission. Meanwhile, Babs cons a year's supply of food out of Scooter for a "magic twig". After a couple of coincidences, Bill believes that the stick works and painfully tries to make his wishes come true. The episode features brief cameo of Robot Model B-9 from Lost in Space.
43	13	"This Eek's Your Life"	Sandy Fries & Savage Steve Holland	May 6, 1995	EC-35b
Annabelle organizes a party with Eek and his friends to celebrate Sharky's birthday, with Sharky's parents and people from his past also invited. Sharky reminisces on his past with the help of his guests, but Eek's fireworks finale destroys Sharky's house. The title is a parody of This Is Your Life.
44	14	"Try Hard"	Frank Santopadre & Savage Steve Holland	July 8, 1995	EC-36a
While Eek is preparing gifts to take to the Kittens Hospital, he destroys Sharky's masterpiece ice sculpture of Platinum which took three years to carve. Sharky calls in sharkdogs from around the world to help him take his revenge. He tricks Eek into entering a condemned building, but all of the sharkdogs' booby traps backfire. The title is a parody of the film Die Hard.

=== Season 4 (1995–96) ===
The fourth season of Eek! Stravaganza, started including another segment, called Klutter. In the following list, "TTL" indicates a Thunderlizards cartoon, and "K" a Klutter cartoon.

No. overall	No. in season	Title	Written by	Original release date	Prod. code
45	1	"Valley of the Dogs" "K: Klutter"	Savage Steve Holland	September 9, 1995	EC-41a
Sharky wants to become a Broadway star, so he leaves for New York and finds work as a cab driver while waiting for his big break. Meanwhile, Eek and Annabelle are kidnapped by the alien Zoltar, intent on destroying Earth to make way for a space superhighway. Sharky gets a part after an audition in which he emits a high-pitched note which coincidentally causes Zoltar's flying saucer to lose control. Eek and Annabelle's escape pod crashes into the theater, destroying it and Sharky's acting career.; Ryan and Wade pick up a puppy from the pound, but triggers their father's pet allergy so they give it to Vanna. While cleaning their room, the pile of clothes is activated by static electricity and they name it Klutter.
46	2	"Pup Fiction" "K: The Klutter and I (Infection)"	Savage Steve Holland	September 16, 1995	EC-41b
Sharky finds a briefcase and Eek insists on trying to return it to its owner. Mittens identifies the owner as Professor Wiggly, while the Squishy Bearz continue to search for the professor's briefcase. The title is a parody of the film Pulp Fiction.; On a backyard campout, the children try to stay awake to watch a late night movie on television while Klutter tries to keep them awake. However, they decide to go to sleep and record it, but forget to insert a videotape into the videocassette recorder.
47	3	"Natural Bored Kittens" "TTL: Lizard of Aaaahs"	Savage Steve Holland	September 23, 1995	EC-42a EC-46a
Eek and three kittens attempt to escape from Sharky, but are locked out of the house. The four seek refuge in a treehouse where Eek entertains the youngsters with stories of his youth, most of which involve his Scottish uncle Mac's bizarre inventions.; Thuggosaur Biff invents an army of robots which he uses to lure the Thunderlizards into a blind canyon by pretending to be beached whales. The Thunderlizards outwit the Thuggosaurs, although Squatt still wants to save the whales.
48	4	"OutbrEek" "TTL: Arctic Blast"	Savage Steve Holland	September 30, 1995	EC-43a EC-48a
Eek scares Sharky while he's having a shower and he passes out, so Eek takes him to Dr. Elmo to be examined. While there, Eek breaks a jar of fleas carrying Sharktarian plague collected from Sharkys island. Eek, Elmo, Sharky and Mittens who delivered a pizza, are locked in quarantine, but while watching Sunday golf on TV they discover that it bores the fleas to death. However, the scientists still think they are infected and send them into space. The episode includes a parody of the shower scene from the film Psycho and the Beatles song "Can't Buy Me Love".; The Thunderlizards track the humans to the Arctic in their submarine and try to capture Bill and Scooter using the "Aurora Borealis" missile, but it backfires and they have to be rescued.
49	5	"Octopussy Cat" "K: Mixed Klutter"	Savage Steve Holland	October 7, 1995	EC-43b
Eek encounters an octopus which falls from a Sea Fun World van after it runs over Sharky. Eek offers to return the octopus to the sea, but is lured into traps by Sharky seeking revenge.; Mrs. Heap invites Kopp and Vanna on a family visit to the aquarium where Klutter goes missing.
50	6	"Going to Eekstremes" "TTL: Bi-Pedator"	Savage Steve Holland	October 21, 1995	EC-42b EC 47b
Eek's cousin Cat the Kitten visits from Milwaukee and convinces Eek to join him in a variety of extreme sports, all of which result in considerable pain for Eek.; Mr. T-Rex accuses the Thunderlizards of goofing off, but his own plans are accidentally foiled by Bill. He is carried off by a wayward guided missile with Bill in his pocket and crashes into Jurassic City. General Galapagos then has to deal with an investigative reporter in a fancy restaurant while the Thunderlizards rekindle their true passion: gardening.; Guest appearance: Mr. T as Mr. T-Rex.
51	7	"Dazed and Eekstremely Confused" "K: Franken-Klutter"	Savage Steve Holland	November 4, 1995	EC-44a
After slapping on aftershave, Sharky's high-pitched scream creates a disastrous chain of events. Eek lands a role in a film directed by John Landis as a watermelon. Meanwhile, Sharky constructs a robotic bulldog in order to fulfill his mission of biting Eek, but Eek accidentally tampers with the robot's controls, causing it to attack Sharky. The title is a parody of Dazed and Confused.; Guest appearances: John Landis and Fabio as themselves.: While attending the school science fair, Klutter is kidnapped by a mad scientist named Dr. Globulous and his assistant Fleem.
52	8	"Eek Space-9" "TTL: The Yawn of Man"	Savage Steve Holland	November 11, 1995	EC-45a EC-46b
In a follow-up to "Star TrEek", a distress call from a Sharktarian warship leads Captain Eek, Ensign Mittens, and Mr. Sock to the crazed Starfleet Commander Berzerk. He is intent on destroying the universe with a weapon known as the "White Dwarf Planet Popper" which he feels is the only way to save the galaxy from "political correctness".; Guest appearances: William Shatner as Commander Berzerk, David Duchovny as Agent Fox Mulder, and Gillian Anderson as Agent Dana Scully.: Babs tries to convince Bill that her new multistoried "anaconda-minimum", or condo, is superior to the men's cave dwelling for excluding jungle slugs and anacondas. Meanwhile, the Thuggosaurs test the "Infantizer", a de-aging weapon designed to reduce its targets to infants on Jurassic City. The plan backfires and both the Thuggosaurs and Thunderlizards regress into babies.
53	9	"The GraduEek" "K: Peanut, Klutter and Jelly"	Savage Steve Holland	November 18, 1995	EC-45b
Sharky graduates from obedience school, but when Eek inadvertently destroys his newly-planted garden and floods his kennel, Sharky's patience is sorely tested. Later, he is charmed by a young woman and they spend the day together and he falls in love, even though she is about to graduate as a mail carrier.; Klutter and the kids try to return a lost turtle to its home.
54	10	"PolitEekly Correct" "TTL: Whatta Woild"	Savage Steve Holland	November 25, 1995	EC-44b EC-49a
Sharky dreams that he is the consulting Dr. Sharky on the Elmo the Elk TV show where people describe why they hurt inside, with his cure being to kick them in the pants. Later, while Sharky is chasing Eek, they cause a quail named Bob White to lose his signature call. They travel across the United States and eventually recover his distinctive "bobwhite" call. However, Eek, Sharky and Elmo catch the wrong plane home and land in Rome where they work as actors in sword-and-sandal films to pay for their return airfare.; While attempting to catch the humans at sea, the Thunderlizards discover the Thuggosaurs' plan to use their secret submarine to blast the dinosaur president's boat. The Thunderlizards become trapped aboard the submarine but manage to sabotage the Thuggosaurs' plot.
55	11	"K: Night of the Living Spuds"	Savage Steve Holland	January 29, 1996	TBA
Klutter and the kids encounter mutant potatoes bent on world domination.
56	12	"TTL: Goop Dreams"	Savage Steve Holland	January 30, 1996	EC-48b
Scooter invents sports called "fruitball" and "beesball" as a cure for Bill's chronic boredom. Meanwhile, the Thunderlizards are given Dr. Steggy's new weapon, a sticky goop to be dropped on the forest floor to stop the humans in their tracks, but the Thunderlizards become trapped in balls of the goop themselves. However, they still manage to stop the Thuggosaurs from levelling Jurassic City by tripping their invading mechanical Dino-Stompers.
57	13	"TTL: It's a Thunderful Life"	Savage Steve Holland	February 1, 1996	EC-49b
In a dream, Squatt has a flashback to when the Thunderlizards rescued a wounded Thuggosaur and were sentenced to 600 years of hard labor in Jurassic Penitentiary for helping the enemy. After that nightmare, Doc and Kutter stated that what happened in Squatt's nightmare did happen which eventually led to General Galapagos to giving them a second chance by hunting the humans. The Thunderlizards are issued with a new "diabolical secret weapon" to use against the humans. Due to Squatt misreading the instructions, the device becomes more of a threat to Jurassic City than the humans.
58	14	"TTL: Thunder & Frightning"	Savage Steve Holland	February 5, 1996	EC-50a
The Thunderlizards prove incompetent in the use of new rocket packs and get caught up in Bill's plan to bury Scooter under a pile of boulders. Meanwhile, the Thunderlizards overhear the Thuggosuars scheming to invade Jurassic City by burrowing underground with their drilling vehicles and manage to foil their plan.
59	15	"K: The Ghost of Goober Bottom Pond"	Savage Steve Holland	February 6, 1996	TBA
Klutter and the kids investigate stories of a ghost.
60	16	"TTL: The Thunder of it All"	Savage Steve Holland	February 7, 1996	EC-50b
Bill seems to have angered a small a thunder cloud which pelts him with lightning bolts. When the storm clears, he is run over by the Thuggosaurs' giant Happy Inchworm which contains a missile targeted for Jurassic City. Meanwhile, The Thunderlizards destroy their Manta Scramjet by activating a fully-armed device while airborne. After they manage to salvage a pair of all-terrain scooters, they come across the inchworm missile launcher and manage to destroy it.
61	17	"K: Bonfire of the Vanna-Tea"	Savage Steve Holland	February 8, 1996	TBA
Klutter ruins Vanna's high society party.
62	18	"TTL: The Magnificent 5½"	Savage Steve Holland	February 16, 1996	EC-47b
The Terrible Thunderlizards are assigned to work with Mr. T-Rex, Nate the Dragon, and El Gordo to infiltrate the X-Zone and uncover the intentions behind the Thuggosaurs' troop movements along the X-Zone border. Being chased by a mastodon, Bill throws the Thuggosaurs into confusion and the Thunderlizards together with Mr. T-Rex's team defeat them. Guest appearance: Mr. T as Mr T-Rex and Nathan Wang as Nate the Dragon.

=== Season 5 (1996–97) ===
No new Klutter episodes were made. In the following list, "TTL" indicates a Thunderlizards cartoon.

No. overall	No. in season	Title	Written by	Original release date	Prod. code
63	1	"DiabolEek"	Savage Steve Holland	September 9, 1996	EC-51b
After a series of nightmares featuring Eek, Sharky seeks help from Dr. Elmo. He tries Elmo's new invention, the "Dream Intruder Nightmare Insertion System", where Eek and Sharky share the same dream. Sharky's ability to deal punishment to Eek greatly aids his recovery.
64	2	"TTL: Pre-Hysteric Man" "TTL: Molten Rock-n-Roll"	Savage Steve Holland	September 13, 1996	EC-53
Bill's attempts to triumph over nature, including man-eating ants, piranhas, and a jungle slug are a miserable failure, but he accidentally opens floodgates which release a flow of lava towards Jurassic City. General Galapagos volunteers the Thunderlizards for a potentially suicidal mission using a truckload of liquid explosives to divert the lava, but they blow up his holiday house instead. Fortunately, Bill inadvertently causes a rockfall which diverts the lava.; Famous rockstar Dee Snidersaur's helicopter crashes into the X-Zone and the Terrible Thunderlizards are sent to rescue him from the Thuggosaurs. Surprisingly, they successfully complete their mission.; Guest appearance: Dee Snider as Dee Snidersaur.
65	3	"MystEek Pizza"	Savage Steve Holland	September 16, 1996	EC-51a
After ruining Sharky's viewing of his favorite television program "Patriotic Warriors", Sharky boots Eek into space where he runs into Zoltar's space ship with their prisoner Elvis who has been kept alive in a tank of liquid. Eek accidentally transfers them all to Earth where Elvis is swallowed by the Loch Ness Monster and the aliens end up with Steven and his family who drive them mad with their monotone singing. The episode features Billy the Whale in a standup comedy routine parody of Seinfeld.
66	4	"Eek Bin Ein Berliner" "TTL: Thunder Valley"	Savage Steve Holland	September 20, 1996	EC-52b EC-54a
Sharky's attempted interception of Eek's visit to Annabelle results in the destruction of his house and leads to a series of interactions with Elmo, Mittens, the Squishy Bearz, penguins and a visit to the Berlin Wall on the day the last piece was toppled, with it landing on top of Eek and Sharky. The episode features a cameo of the "all-knowing monolith" from 2001: A Space Odyssey.; Scooter suggests that Bill is the target for Jungle Slugs because he has become plump. He advises Bill to lose weight so he invents exercise machines which prove painful for Bill. While in hot pursuit of the humans, the Terrible Thunderlizards have a series of mishaps, including Squatt swallowing their supply of liquid helium.
67	5	"Snowbored"	Savage Steve Holland	October 14, 1996	EC-52a
Sharky tries everything to get rid of Eek in the winter snow, but all his plans backfire. Eek then encounters Elmo who is attempting to raise money for Timmy in a snowboard contest, but after Eek explains the risks of snowboarding, Elmo tricks Eek into competing in the race instead. During the race, Sharky continues with his vain attempts against Eek, but Eek wins the race and Sharky ends up as a plaything for the gorillas at the zoo.
68	6	"Fists of Furry"	Savage Steve Holland	October 28, 1996	EC-55a
Sharky decides to become a martial arts expert with the aid of Cynthia Rothrock, but she also offers to train Eek. When she strains her ankle and is kidnapped, Sharky and Eek go to her rescue, using their new martial arts skills with limited success until Fabio arrives to help. This episode parodies Power Rangers as the Shower Strangers and features the theme from Shaft. Guest appearances: Cynthia Rothrock and Fabio as themselves.
69	7	"The Island of Dr. Meow" "TTL: Home O'Sapien Alone"	Savage Steve Holland	July 7, 1997	EC-55b EC-56b
Eek's attempt to brighten Sharky's day backfires and results in the total destruction of Sharky's kennel. An attempt to fly a kite results in Sharky getting caught on a plane and landing on a tropical island which becomes occupied with a mad scientist who has mutated monkeys with vegetables. Sharky saves the monkeys, but when he learns that the search for him that Eek initiated has brought the world together, he decides it is better to stay on the island. The title is a parody of The Island of Doctor Moreau.; After the Thunderlizards demolish the wrong building, they drive their bulldozers into the X-Zone while the general cools off. Meanwhile, Scooter invents an alphabet while Bill is stung by a giant bee and walks off in disgust to be alone, only to be struck by a meteor. The Thunderlizards are trapped by the Thuggosaurs, but they manage to rig a remote control device and summon a bulldozer to save themselves. Bill despairs of ever discovering human destiny. The title is a parody of Home Alone.
70	8	"Nightmare on Elmo St." "TTL: Night of the Living Duds"	Savage Steve Holland	July 14, 1997	EC-54b EC-57b
Eek offers to help Elmo bake for a cake sale to help Timmy who believes that he is a genie. However, Elmo inserts too much mixture into a microwavable chocolate soufflé and it comes alive, attacking them. Eek interrupts Sharky's evening with a group of beautiful women to warn him, but it results in them both being pursued by the monster which consumes everything in its path, including the Fox Children's Network headquarters. Eek and Sharky run to Cape Carbunkle where Hank and Jib stuff them into a nuclear powered bomb which they drop onto the monster. Their plan works and the monster is reduced to a chocolate dessert, but Eek and Sharky end up in Timmy's genie bottle, resulting in a nod to I Dream of Jeannie.; Guest appearance: Margaret Loesch as herself.: General Galapagos sends the Thunderlizards into the X-Zone to destroy a new Thuggosaur super beehive cannon while he goes on holiday. The Thunderlizards are shot down, but accidentally find the Thuggosaur underground base and redirect the cannon. When it is fired, they and the beehive bomb land on the island where General Galapagos is vacationing.
71	9	"Show Squirls"	Savage Steve Holland	July 18, 1997	EC-57a
Neighbor Steven interrupts the final gripping episode of the Squishy Bearz television miniseries and asks Eek to help the squirrel family in their effort to put on a show for the broken pet hospital. Steven's flamboyant cousin Lawrence from Las Vegas insists on Eek joining in as well. Lawrence appoints a shell-shocked Sharky as the manager of their traveling roadshow. Sharky arranges for them to be the opening act for "Frankie", but Frankie sends them out to play at Area 51 instead. Meanwhile, the base has been taken over by the alien Zoltar, who kidnaps the troupe to his planet. The episode features parodies of the song "Le Freak" as "Eek Out" and a scene from The Adventures of Priscilla, Queen of the Desert.
72	10	"Eekscaliber"	Savage Steve Holland	July 21, 1997	EC-59b
One sunny day, Eek leaves a chocolate bunny for Sharky, who slips and falls on the melted chocolate. After hitting his head, Sharky is transported back to the time of the Arthurian legends. Eek is the king and Sharky accidentally saves the kingdom from attacking armored penguins. In gratitude, Eek makes Sharky a knight by clobbering him with a huge stone, so Sharky pulls a sword from the stone in an attempt to kill Eek. However, he and Sir Elmo inadvertently join Eek in a quest to find the holy grill which had been stolen, ruining the celebratory barbecue. During their quest, Eek earns the gratitude of a fire-breathing dragon with a sore throat who then saves the travelers and Queen Annabelle from Zoltar. The episode features a caricature of Sean Connery as the dragon.
73	11	"The FugEektive"	Savage Steve Holland	July 25, 1997	EC-56a
In an episode of America's Most Wanted, Eek explains how he bought a tree for Sharky on Arbor Day which completely destroyed his home and created a series of events where Sharky was suspected of robbing an armored car. "Weird Al" Yankovic appears on the show to defend Sharky who has since gone missing. Eventually, John Walsh and Eek find Sharky and after a chase in the sewers. Sharky agrees to return, but Eek completely messes up the rescue.; Guest appearances: John Walsh and "Weird Al" Yankovic as themselves.
74	12	"The Sound of MusEek" "TTL: Oh... The Humanity"	Savage Steve Holland	July 28, 1997	EC-58
Sharky is the leader of a gang of "droogs", but after he leaves the milk bar, he is hit on the head and finds himself dressed as a '70s pimp. Meanwhile, Elmo forms a band with Eek and Mittens to play at a benefit concert called Timmystock and raise money for an operation to remove a piggy bank from Timmy's nose. They call on Chris Leary on Fox Kids Radio to promote the concert, to little success. Meanwhile, after a series of mishaps, Sharky attacks a set of garbage cans and Elmo and Mittens bring him in as the band's drummer. They then play a set of popular rock music at the concert, drawing a huge crowd. This episode is a parody of A Clockwork Orange and The Elephant Man and features music in the styles of Curtis Mayfield, ZZ Top, Jethro Tull, Village People and Kiss.; Guest appearance: Chris Leary as himself.: Dr. Steggy finds a huge fossilized bone and General Galapagos pulls the Thunderlizards from their game of Twister to protect him and his valuable paleontological find on their return to Jurassic City. Elsewhere, Scooter invents dental hygiene and tries it out on Bill, although the dental swisher is much too powerful. Meanwhile, the Thunderlizards both lose and recover the bone, incidentally causing Bill even more pain and discomfort.
75	13	"Rock-Eek 6"	Savage Steve Holland	August 1, 1997	EC-59a
Eek dreams that Annabelle is a 50-foot giant with an appetite to match. A 50-foot woman then delivers a letter for Sharky with an invitation to see Platinum speak at an obedience school reunion, so Elmo and Eek give him a lift. At the ceremony, Eek causes an accident where Sharky injures Platinum so she cannot battle Roboticus the Disturbed Android to raise money for Timmy's latest operation. Feeling guilty, Sharky agrees to take her place in battling Roboticus. Sharky goes into training, but all the pain and discomfort does not prepare him, and he faints at the sight of Roboticus. However, Eek spills a bucket of water over the robot, causing it to short-circuit and fall over, and Sharky crawls out from underneath it to be declared the winner. The episode parodies Attack of the 50 Foot Woman, Rocky, and Karate Kid.

== Sources ==
- Library of Congress (most airdates for seasons 1–4)
