= Deborah Richter =

American actress

- Other names: Debi Richter
- Occupation: Actress
- Years active: 1977-2019
- Spouse: Charles Haid (m. 1985; div. 1988)

Deborah Richter, also known as Debi Richter, is an American actress. She appeared in the films Cyborg (1989), Square Dance (1987), Winners Take All (1987) and Hot Moves (1985). She also appeared on TV in Hill Street Blues (alongside her husband Charles Haid) and All is Forgiven.

== Filmography ==
=== Film ===
| Year | Title | Role | Notes |
|---|---|---|---|
| 1977 | One on One | Kathy | |
| 1979 | Hometown U.S.A. | Dolly | |
| 1979 | Swap Meet | Susan | |
| 1980 | Midnight Madness | Candy | |
| 1980 | Gorp | Barbara | |
| 1984 | Hot Moves | Heidi | |
| 1987 | Square Dance | Gwen | |
| 1987 | Winners Take All | Cindy Wickes | |
| 1987 | Promised Land | Pammie | |
| 1989 | Cyborg | Nady Simmons | |
| 1989 | The Banker | Melanie | |
| 2001 | Cahoots | Vikki | |

=== Television ===
| Year | Title | Role | Notes |
|---|---|---|---|
| 1977 | The Waltons | Darlene Jarvis | Episode: "The Ferris Wheel" |
| 1977 | Baretta | Cary | Episode: "The Reunion" |
| 1977 | Aspen | Angela Morelli | Episode: "Aspen: Chapter I" |
| 1978 | Wheels | Val | |
| 1978 | Centennial | Rebecca | Episode: "The Wagon and the Elephant" |
| 1979 | Charlie's Angels | Patty Cantwell | Episode: "Teen Angels" |
| 1979 | The Rebels | Molly | |
| 1979 | Portrait of a Stripper | Bonnie | TV movie |
| 1979 | Barnaby Jones | Sally Marshall | Episode: "Indoctrination in Evil" |
| 1980 | Stone | | Episode: "Just a Little Blow Between Friends" |
| 1980 | The Misadventures of Sheriff Lobo | Colleen | Episode: "The Dirtiest Girls in Town" |
| 1981 | Bosom Buddies | Melissa | Episode: "Best Friends" |
| 1981 | Twirl | Brigit Kummel | TV movie |
| 1982 | The Phoenix | Co-ed | Episode: "One of Them" |
| 1982–1987 | Hill Street Blues | Daryl Ann / Hooker | 14 episodes |
| 1983 | The Fall Guy | Nurse | Episode: "Trauma" |
| 1984 | Riptide | Honey | Episode: "Double Your Pleasure" |
| 1984 | Hardcastle and McCormick | Kimmy | Episode: "You Would Cry Too, If It Happened to You" |
| 1984 | Mickey Spillane's Mike Hammer | Chi Chi | Episode: "Kill Devil" |
| 1984 | T. J. Hooker | Kelly LaRue | Episode: "Hardcore Connection" |
| 1985 | My Wicked, Wicked Ways: The Legend of Errol Flynn | Lucille Hartley | TV movie |
| 1985 | Cheers | Bambi | Episode: "The Mail Goes to Jail" |
| 1985 | Hotel | Amy | Episode: "Missing Pieces" |
| 1985 | Alfred Hitchcock Presents | Kathy | Episode: "Night Fever" |
| 1986 | Airwolf | Lynn | Episode: "Birds of Paradise" |
| 1986 | All Is Forgiven | Sherry Levy | |
| 1986 | Christmas Eve | Patti | TV movie |
| 1987 | CBS Summer Playhouse | Holly | Episode: "Roughhouse" |
| 1991 | Gabriel's Fire | Cherry Moon | Episode: "Kelly Green" |
| 1991 | Lookwell | Miss Royster | TV movie |
| 1997 | Men Behaving Badly | Tiffany | Episode: "It's Good to Be Dead" |
