= Hot Moves =

1985 film by Jim Sotos

- Directed by: Jim Sotos
- Screenplay by: Larry Anderson; Peter Foldy
- Starring: Michael Zorek; Adam Silbar; Jeff Fishman; Johnny Timko; Jill Schoelen; Deborah Richter
- Distributed by: Cardinal Entertainment
- Release date: October 4, 1984
- Country: United States
- Language: English
- Box office: $2,732,684

Hot Moves is an American 1984 comedy film by director Jim Sotos starring Michael Zorek and Jill Schoelen.

== Synopsis ==
Four friends, annoyed at how almost everyone else they know is having sex but them, agree to do what they can to help each other lose their virginity before the end of the summer. Most of their opportunities are foiled by their inexperience and bad planning. Michael, the most sensible boy of the foursome, really just wants to stay with his long-time girlfriend and take their relationship to an intimate level, but after putting him off for six months he grows impatient and splits up with her to seek his fortune elsewhere.

== Cast ==
- Michael Zorek as Barry
- Adam Silbar as Michael
- Jeff Fishman as Joey
- Johnny Timko as Scotty
- Jill Schoelen as Julie Ann
- Deborah Richter as Heidi
- Monique Gabrielle as Babs
- Tami Holbrook as Sissy
- Gayle Gannes as Jamie
- Heather Ling as Robin
- Clark Jarrett as Roger
- Kerry Noonan as Wendy
- Roger Rose as Cliff
- David Christopher as Female Impersonator
- Virgil Frye as The Porno Man
- Jerry Maren as Arcade Vendor
- Gerardo as Break Dancer

== Reception ==
Peter Stack of the San Francisco Chronicle gave it a rating of "Snoozing Viewer" saying "Dirty old men may like this movie." The Sacramento Bee's reviewer George Williams finished his negative review "But there isn't one original idea. There are no clean jokes, and no dirty ones you haven't heard too many times already. The photography looks like five o'clock news outtakes. The acting is zero. The music is what you might hear anytime, live, from a neighbor's garage. Enough." John Brooker in Hertfordshire Mercury's Video Scene says "there is so little in the way of originality that the laughs are few and far between."
