= Eek! The Cat =

1992 American-Canadian animated TV series

- Title card for Eek! Stravaganza
- Also known as: Eek! and the Terrible Thunderlizards; Eek! Stravaganza
- Genre: Slapstick; Surreal comedy
- Created by: Savage Steve Holland; Bill Kopp
- Directed by: John Halfpenny (seasons 1–3); Jamie Whitney (seasons 4–5)
- Voices of: Bill Kopp; Charlie Adler; Curtis Armstrong; Jaid Barrymore; Dan Castellaneta; Cam Clarke; Elizabeth Daily; Elinor Donahue; Corey Feldman; Sandy Fox; Brad Garrett; Karen Haber; Amy Heckerling; Savage Steve Holland; Kathy Ireland; John Kassir; Tawny Kitaen; Gary Owens; Jason Priestley; David Silverman; Kurtwood Smith; Halle Stanford; Kirk Thatcher; Michael Zorek
- Narrated by: Bill Kopp; Gary Owens
- Music by: Nathan Wang
- Opening theme: by Dee Snider
- Countries of origin: United States; Canada
- Original language: English
- No. of seasons: 5
- No. of episodes: 75 (list of episodes)

Production
- Executive producer: Savage Steve Holland
- Producers: Patrick Loubert; Michael Hirsh; Clive A. Smith
- Camera setup: Single-camera
- Running time: 24 mins.
- Production companies: Savage Studios Ltd.; Nelvana; Film Roman; Fox Children's Productions

Original release
- Network: Fox (Fox Kids) (United States); YTV (Canada)
- Release: September 12, 1992 – August 1, 1997

Related
- The Terrible Thunderlizards; Klutter!

Eek! The Cat (retitled Eek! and the Terrible Thunderlizards and eventually Eek! Stravaganza) is an animated series created by Savage Steve Holland and Bill Kopp. It was produced by Fox Kids, Savage Studios, Ltd. and Nelvana, with animation being outsourced to Wang Film Productions. Episodes were broadcast from 1992 to 1997 on Fox's former Saturday morning children's block Fox Kids, and in Canada on YTV from 1992 to 1998. It revolves around the titular character – a helpful, yet hapless purple cat named Eek – who attempts to help others in need, but only puts himself into crazy situations while doing so.

Ownership of the series passed to Disney in 2001 when Disney acquired Fox Kids Worldwide.

== Premise ==
Eek! the Cat revolves around the misadventures of a jolly purple cat named Eek, who lives in the fictitious city of McTropolis. His motto is "it never hurts to help", an attitude that generally gets him into trouble, from which much of the physical and visual humor of the show is derived. Initially, most of the humor centered around Eek's various injuries during his attempts to help or save another character. Over the course of the series, a far wider variety of humor is utilized and Eek generally has the capacity to unintentionally deal as much, if not more pain to other characters (mainly Sharky the Sharkdog) as he undergoes himself.

Other characters include Eek's human family, with whom he is unable to communicate via spoken language; Sharky the Sharkdog, who despises Eek, something the cat is most of the time oblivious to; and Eek's girlfriend, Annabelle, who he sees as beautiful despite other characters commenting on her weight.

The show featured a guitar riff intro, slapstick humor, and pop culture references. Shows vary from standard cartoon fare to film spoofs (such as Apocalypse Now and A Clockwork Orange). During the second season, a special musical episode titled "Quadrapedia" aired; the first Christmas episode was written almost entirely in rhyme. The show featured many cameos by celebrities, some of whom came back for several episodes.

== Characters ==
=== Main characters ===
Eek is normally very optimistic.

- Eek the Cat (voiced by Bill Kopp) – Eek, a purple cat, always puts others' safety, needs, and comfort before his own. Eek can talk with all animals and most humans. However, he is, oddly enough, unable to converse with his owners: Mom, Wendy Elizabeth, and J.B. He often exclaims "Kumbaya!" His motto is "It never hurts to help!", although with Eek this is rarely the case. The major running gag within the show is that Eek's selfless nature usually gets him (and most of the time Sharky) caught up in painful situations such as getting caught in mail and baggage sorters (both of which appear designed to intentionally damage their contents) and being chased by Sharky, upon which he would scream "Oh gosh, it hurts!" while the Sharkdog's acoustic guitar theme played. Despite his misfortunes, episodes usually end with Eek rewarded in a way due to his selfless nature and willingness to face adversity squarely. He has frequently been shown to be a girl magnet, attracting many beautiful females throughout the series while gently turning them down and informing them that he already has Annabelle as a girlfriend.
- Annabelle (voiced by Tawny Kitaen in 1992–1995, Karen Haber in 1994–1995 and 1997) – A female cat and Eek's girlfriend who appears like a Southern belle with an exaggerated Southern accent. She is extremely fat, although her arms and legs are quite skinny. Eek somehow seems to be unaware of her size and just sees Annabelle as being very beautiful. He is genuinely surprised whenever someone comments on Annabelle's weight, saying that "the more of you there is, the more there is to love". Eek fell in love with Annabelle the first time he saw her, when he was hit by the arrow of a one-winged cupid. Like Wendy Elizabeth, Annabelle is quite emotional and can burst into tears if anything upsets her. Annabelle is implied in many instances to be gluttonous, quickly appearing at buffet tables to scarf down all the food on them and ordering large amounts at restaurants, snack bars and drive-ins. Despite being present in the theme song, Anabelle doesn't appear in the series proper until the episode "Catsanova".
- Sharky the Sharkdog – Annabelle's pet guard dog who defends her house with the viciousness (and also the overall appearance) of a shark. Sharky does not talk, but more than makes up for it in growls (though other animal characters such as Eek can comprehend what he is saying, and subtitles are sometimes provided). Sharky has a distinctive leitmotif that plays whenever he attacks other characters. Sharky typically terrorizes Eek for fun, although occasionally as a reaction to Eek's incessant trouble-causing helpfulness. There are moments where the two get along and partner in the plot line, but they happen to be rare. He can also show rare moments of friendliness towards Eek, such as in "It's a Wonderful Nine Lives" where he shows up at Eek's house on Christmas with his other friends and family near the end of the special. Sharky loves to bite things, mostly mail-carriers. Sharky also has quite a bit of skill as a craftsman; he is constantly rebuilding his doghouse after Eek accidentally destroys it. Like Snoopy's doghouse, the interior of Sharky's doghouse resembles a cavernous mansion with several floors and a garage. Sharky has a curious affiliation with firearms and explosives, which often backfire on him. In many cases, Sharky and Eek's relationship follows a subtle pattern of karma and catharsis. Similar to Tom from Tom and Jerry, Sharky was drawn in a quadrupedal stance in the earliest episodes, but beginning with "Shark Therapy" in season two, he gradually became almost exclusively bipedal and obtained the same level of anthropomorphism as the other animal characters, albeit without the ability to speak.
- Elmo the Elk (voiced by Savage Steve Holland) – Elmo (also known as Elmo: The Brown Nosed Reindeer, The Incredible Elmo) is an elk and Eek's extremely inept but loyal friend who typically maintains a courageous façade, but is actually quite cowardly. He is often trying to raise money to pay for some operation on his younger brother Timmy, which often involves him and Eek in dangerous stunts or some form of action adventure. He also believes that there are 31 days in the month of June. In his first appearance, Elmo had a thick Italian accent which proceeded to get more downplayed as the series progressed.
  - Timmy – Elmo's younger brother who apparently suffers from a range of obscure medical ailments and is constantly in need of expensive medical treatments. This results in Elmo trying to raise money, often with Eek's help, although these activities usually involve dangerous stunts which only end in pain for Eek.
- Mom (voiced by Elinor Donahue) – The apparently single mother of the family that owns Eek. She loves studying foreign languages and a running gag features her absent-mindedly listening to foreign language cassettes, reciting the nonsensical translations of English phrases while cleaning the house, unknowingly causing mayhem in the process - a particular favorite is "Spangalese". Once on a flight to England she listened to a tape of British-accented English, a language she found especially challenging. She is very warm and loving towards Wendy Elizabeth and J.B., often indulging them and giving them their favorite treats. She has an optimistic personality similar to Eek, and always tends to look on the bright side despite the mayhem that arises.
- Wendy Elizabeth and J.B. (voiced by Elizabeth Daily and Charlie Adler) – The children of the family that owns Eek, Wendy Elizabeth and J.B. are whiny (the latter to a lesser extent) and hyperactive. They watch a lot of television, and often eat strange things like literal bags of sugar or meals such as "their favorite", herring and toothpaste sandwiches. Their favorite show is The Squishy Bearz Rainbow of Enchanted Fun Minute, a spoof of the Care Bears. They have similarities in their personalities, but also differences. J.B. is slightly low on overall intelligence, but has a more even temper and better control of his emotions, while Wendy Elizabeth is a bit smarter, but also very emotionally fragile, crying or sobbing over the slightest bad or undesirable thing that may happen to her (such as getting a defective bicycle bell for her birthday, getting a "D" on a test, or initially getting no treats on Halloween), sometimes causing natural disasters like earthquakes in doing so. Nonetheless, both children are generally shown to be goodhearted and love Eek and their mother very much.
- Mittens (voiced by Dan Castellaneta in 1992–1994, John Kassir in 1995–1997) – Eek's friend, a fellow cat, has light blue fur, always wears red mittens (owing to his name), and he belongs to an old woman with failing sight. He suffers from extreme paranoia and he always ends a sentence with the word "Man" (e.g. "Look out, man!"). Mittens appears to have been based on Dennis Hopper's unnamed photojournalist character from Apocalypse Now, even portraying the equivalent character in the episode "Eekpocalypse Now!"

=== Supporting characters ===
- The Squishy Bearz – Four colorful bears with their own children's TV program called The Squishy Bearz Rainbow of Enchanted Fun Minute set in the land of Toodlesnook in a parody of the Care Bears.
  - Kozy (voiced by Jaid Barrymore in earlier episodes, Elizabeth Daily in later episodes) – A yellow bear who has a happy and friendly attitude.
  - Puffy (voiced by Cam Clarke) – A blue bear who has a happy and friendly attitude.
  - Wuz Wuz (voiced by Cam Clarke) – A pink bear who has a happy and friendly attitude.
  - Pierre (voiced by Bill Kopp) – A green bear who speaks with a French accent, wears a beret, is bitter and cynical, but also carries considerably more intelligence and common-sense than the others and often has to save them from their own naivety and stop disasters in the making.
- Granny (voiced by Charlie Adler) – An old lady that Eek often encounters.
- Steven – A squirrel who lives in a nearby tree. Steven and his family are too incredibly boring for even Eek to stand being around them for long. Eek first met them during one of his evasions from Sharky. They even prove to be boring when Sharky finally gets in.
  - Susan – The wife of Steven.
  - Steven Junior – The son of Steven.
  - Hally – The daughter of Steven.
  - Acorn – The son of Steven.
  - Gunter – The son of Steven.
- Piggy the Penguin (voiced by Cam Clarke) – First appearing in the episode "The Lord of the Fleas" (a parody of Lord of the Flies), Piggy is a small penguin with thick eyeglasses who can often be seen sporting a pig mask. He is often seen in the company of a larger and deeper-voiced penguin as they take part in the bizarre circumstances of the show. Often, in a running gag, Piggy will discover something strange and attempt to inform his larger companion, who then responds by saying "Shut up Piggy!" Piggy has a distinct British accent, another reference to Lord of the Flies. Piggy returns several times in quick cameos and occasionally takes a larger role.
- Hank and Jib (voiced by Dan Castellaneta and Bill Kopp) – A pair of government scientists working at Cape Carbunkle a ground control station. A running gag has them clutching cups of coffee and conversing in dull tones while in the company of other scientists attempting to get the Hubble Space Telescope operational. However, a character or object from the show's main story usually causes the telescope either malfunction or to point to somewhere on Earth like a beach where Fabio is relaxing. Once one of the outcomes happen, Hank would ask "Who wants lunch?" or a variation of that. On other occasions, Hank and Jib would work on an experiment with drawbacks that the governor had forewarned them about.
- Platinum - A woman wrestler and member of the Patriotic Warriors team who wears a stars and stripes outfit. She is Sharky's main love interest although she seemingly doesn't return his affection except for in "Lord of the Fleas", where she comes to Sharky's pool party and feeds him grapes. She, like many other female characters on the show, has shown herself to be attracted to Eek, mainly in "Eek's Funny Thing That He Does".

=== Villains ===
- Zoltar (voiced by Brad Garrett in normal form) – An evil alien bent on invading or destroying Earth for various reasons that often involves using Annabelle to power his laser, but his attempts are always thwarted by Eek and his friends. He would often use different disguises of an innocent figure in order to get close to Annabelle.
- The Rat Pack -Four rats who are described by a narrator as "four sinister rodents from the wrong side of the tracks whose sole occupation is making life miserable for others". They first appear in the episode "Bearz N' the Hood".
  - Ringo (voiced by Eddie Deezen) – The leader of the Rat Pack.
  - Shifty – The tallest member of the Rat Pack.
  - Loser – The shortest member of the Rat Pack.
  - Stinky – The least intelligent member of the Rat Pack.

== Cast ==
- Bill Kopp – Eek! The Cat, Pierre, Jib, Day Z. Kutter ("The Terrible Thunderlizards" segment), Additional Voices
- Charles Adler – JB, Granny (1992, 1995), Bill ("The Terrible Thunderlizards" segment), Additional Voices
- Curtis Armstrong – Scooter ("The Terrible Thunderlizards" segment")
- Jaid Barrymore – Kozy (earlier episodes)
- Dan Castellaneta – Mittens (1992–1994), Hank, Mel Erving ("Klutter!" segment), Additional Voices (1992–1995)
- Cam Clarke – Puffy, Wuz Wuz, Piggy the Penguin, Dr. Steggy ("The Terrible Thunderlizards" segment), Ryan Heap ("Klutter!" segment), Additional Voices
- Elizabeth Daily – Wendy Elizabeth (1992–1995), Kozy (II, on "Cape Fur" until the end of the show), Additional Voices
- Elinor Donahue – Mom (1992–1995, 1997), Additional Voices
- Corey Feldman – Bo Diddly Squatt ("The Terrible Thunderlizards" segment; 1996–1997)
- Sandy Fox – Sandee Heap ("Klutter!" segment)
- Brad Garrett – Zoltar, Thuggo ("The Terrible Thunderlizards" segment), Additional Voices
- Karen Haber – Annabelle (II, filled in for Tawny in 1994–1995, and permanently in 1997)
- Amy Heckerling – Nel Irving ("Klutter!" segment)
- Savage Steve Holland – Elmo The Elk, Doc Tari ("The Terrible Thunderlizards" segment), Wade Heap ("Klutter" segment), Additional Voices
- Kathy Ireland – Andrea Heap ("Klutter!" segment)
- John Kassir – Mittens (1994–1997), Additional Voices
- Tawny Kitaen – Annabelle (I, 1992–1995)
- Gary Owens – Announcer, Narrator, Additional Voices
- Jason Priestley – Bo Diddly Squatt ("The Terrible Thunderlizards" segment; 1994–1996)
- David Silverman – John Heap ("Klutter!" segment)
- Kurtwood Smith – General Galapagos ("The Terrible Thunderlizards" segment), The Brain (in "Eek's International Adventure")
- Halle Stanford – Vanna Erving ("Klutter!" segment)
- Kirk Thatcher – Klutter ("Klutter!" segment)
- Michael Zorek – Kopp ("Klutter!" segment)

=== Guest stars ===
The following are listed under this billing in the credits:

- Gillian Anderson – Agent Dana Scully (in "Eek Space-9")
- Shane and Sia Barbi – Themselves (in "It's a Very Merry Eek's Mas" and "Honey I Shrunk the Cat")
- Don Cornelius – Himself (in "Shark Doggy Dog")
- Tim Curry – Narrator (in "It's a Wonderful Nine Lives")
- Eddie Deezen – Ringo
- David Duchovny – Agent Fox Mulder (in "Eek Space-9")
- Adam Goldberg –
- Nina Goldin –
- Bobcat Goldthwait – Blitzen (in "It's a Very Merry Eek's Mas")
- Chuck Jagger – Himself (1997)
- Fabio – Himself (in "Dazed and Eekstremely Confused" and "Fists of Furry")
- Phil Hartman – Psycho Bunny (in "Cape Fur")
- Buck Henry – Cupid (in "Catsanova")
- Nia James – Herself (1995)
- Kimberley Kates – Witch (in "HallowEek")
- John Landis – Himself (in "Dazed and Eekstremely Confused")
- Chris Leary – Himself (in "Shark Doggy Dog" and "The Sound of MusEek")
- Heather Locklear – Alice (in "Fatal Eekstraction")
- Margaret Loesch – Herself (in "Eek's SnEek PEek" and "Nightmare on Elmo St.")
- Gayle Obonzinski –
- Bronson Pinchot –
- Cynthia Rothrock (Black Belt Hall of Fame/Stunt Woman/Actress); Herself (in "Fists of Furry")
- William Shatner – Santa Claus (in "It's a Very Merry Eek's Mas"), Commander Berzerk (in "Eek Space-9")
- Dee Snider – Dee Snidersaur (in "Molten Rock-n-Roll")
- Julie Strain – Herself (1997)
- Mr. T – Mr. T-Rex ("The Terrible Thunderlizards" segment) (1994–1996)
- John Walsh – Himself (in "The FugEektive")
- "Weird Al" Yankovic – Himself (in "The FugEektive")
- Ralph Cirella (The Howard Stern Show)

== Other segments ==
=== The Terrible Thunderlizards ===
The Terrible Thunderlizards segment was introduced in the middle of the second season of Eek! The Cat. Like Eek!, this segment was also created by Holland and Kopp. It ran from November 20, 1993, to July 28, 1997. The show was originally intended to be a spin-off from Eek! The Cat, but it aired as a weekly segment on Eek! Stravaganza.

Like Eek!, the segment was produced by Fox and Savage Studios with animation by Nelvana. The segment chronicled the misadventures of a trio of dinosaur mercenaries named Doc Tari (voiced by Savage Steve Holland), Bo Diddly Squat (voiced by Jason Priestley in 1994–1996, Corey Feldman in 1996–1997), and Day Z. Cutter (voiced by Bill Kopp) who were released from incarceration by General Galapagos (voiced by Kurtwood Smith) and charged with the task of eliminating two primitive human beings Bill and Scooter (voiced by Charlie Adler and Curtis Armstrong). Despite their superior size and firepower and the obliviousness of their targets, the mercenaries always fail with comedic results. When they are not after the humans, the Thunderlizards must protect Jurassic City from the Thuggosaurs led by Thuggo (voiced by Brad Garrett).

=== Klutter! ===
Another segment, this time titled Klutter!, was introduced in the fourth season of Eek! Stravaganza in 1995. It followed Ryan and Wade Heap (voiced by Cam Clarke and Savage Steve Holland) and their pet Klutter (vocal effects provided by Kirk Thatcher), who they created from a static reaction to pile of junk that their mother Andrea (voiced by Kathy Ireland) wanted them to pick up because the constant allergies of their father John (voiced by David Silverman) made it impossible for them to have a real dog. There are other characters in the show, like Sandee Heap (voiced by Sandy Fox), who was lonely at first, before Klutter came into their lives. They went on mysteries, a la Scooby-Doo, to save animals and solve crimes.

Klutter! concluded its run in February 1996 with eight segments. Unlike Eek! and Thunderlizards, the segment was created by David Silverman and Holland along with being animated by Film Roman.

== Production and broadcast ==
The original idea for the show came from Savage Steve Holland's experience as a cat owner. One of his cats was named Eek.

The show premiered on the now-defunct Fox Kids block in 1992 as Eek! The Cat. Thirteen 20 minute episodes were produced for its first season. A recurring character named Mr. Iwanter was a caricature of then-Fox Kids executive Sid Iwanter.

For the second season in 1993, the show's format was retooled (except for "It's a Very Merry Eek's Mas", which originally aired as a prime-time special). In each episode were two nine-minute segments. One was Eek! the Cat. The other was The Terrible Thunderlizards. The Thunderlizards segments were intended to air at the start of the season, but it began two months later because of production delays. When they started airing, the series title was changed to Eek! and the Terrible Thunderlizards. Also, the creators originally intended to include two one-minute segments. The first would feature the Squishy Bearz, and the second one were to feature other characters from Eek!, but because the show turned out to be too long, the one-minute segments were scrapped. In January 1994, Fox aired four Thunderlizards segments as two Thunderlizards specials.

During the season, Kopp left the show (though he still did the voice of Eek and others) for his own show, The Shnookums and Meat Funny Cartoon Show for Disney.

In the fall of 1995, another segment called Klutter was added, rotating with the Thunderlizards. This segment lasted a year. Kato Kaelin was originally scheduled to be a guest voice in an episode, but Fox network refused.

== Home media ==
For years, all that was available commercially was a single VHS tape with the episodes "Catsanova" and "HawaiiEek 5–0" on it. It was released in 1995.

In July 2001, Eek! and other properties of Saban Entertainment were sold to The Walt Disney Company. As of 2026, no word from Disney has been spoken about releasing the series to DVD in North America. Episodes of the show have also yet to appear on streaming services, like Disney+.

As with many other Saban Entertainment series, the only major English-language DVD release is by Czech distributor North Video, featuring both Czech and English audio and original video (with English-language text) in the original production order. The first 39 episodes were released on 12 volumes, from June 25 to September 17, 2010.

== Video game ==
Reception (Video game)

Review score
Publication	Score
Nintendo Power	12.5/20

An Eek! The Cat video game was released for the Super NES in 1994 which was reskin of the 1993 Amiga game Sleepwalker Time Extension listed Eek! The Cat as one of the worst SNES games.
