= Square Dance (film) =

1987 film by Daniel Petrie

- Theatrical release poster
- Directed by: Daniel Petrie
- Screenplay by: Alan Hines
- Based on: Square Dance by Alan Hines
- Produced by: Daniel Petrie
- Starring: Jason Robards; Jane Alexander; Winona Ryder; Rob Lowe
- Cinematography: Jacek Laskus
- Edited by: Bruce Green
- Music by: Bruce Broughton
- Production companies: Island Pictures; NBC Productions
- Distributed by: Island Pictures
- Release dates: January 16, 1987 (U.S. Film Festival); February 20, 1987 (United States)
- Running time: 112 minutes
- Country: United States
- Language: English
- Budget: $4 million
- Box office: $225,358

Square Dance (television broadcast title: Home Is Where the Heart Is) is a 1987 American coming-of-age drama film directed by Daniel Petrie from a screenplay by Alan Hines, based on his novel of the same name. The film stars Jason Robards, Jane Alexander, Winona Ryder, and Rob Lowe, and was released on February 20, 1987, by Island Pictures. It earned Lowe his only Golden Globe Award nomination for a film role.

== Plot ==
Gemma Dillard is a 13-year-old country girl who lives with her Grandpa Dillard on a farm in the Texas Panhandle. Gemma is visited by her mother, who lives in Fort Worth, with an offer to come stay with her in the city. Her mother (who had Gemma when she was still only a teenager) is now married with a job as a hair stylist and can provide for her.

Gemma at first experiences slight culture shock in regards to big city life, but soon comes to accept her new surroundings. She becomes acquainted with a man with an intellectual disability, 21-year-old Rory Torrance. They play together, hang out together, and imagine that they are married.

The story focuses on a series of bittersweet experiences that eventually return Gemma to the country.

== Cast ==
- Winona Ryder as Gemma Dillard
- Jason Robards as Grandpa Dillard
- Jane Alexander as Juanelle King, Gemma's mother
- Rob Lowe as Rory Torrance
- Guich Koock as Frank
- Deborah Richter as Gwen

== Production ==
After coming across the Alan Hines novel Square Dance, Charles Haid who was looking to move into film production decided the book would make a good film. Haid brought the project to Jane Alexander who agreed to star and executive produce the film, with the two in turn bringing in Daniel Petrie to direct who collaborated with Hines in adapting the novel to film. After an initial financing deal with FilmDallas fell through, Michael Nesmith of The Monkees put up $2.5 million through his production company Pacific Arts Pictures while Haid was able to secure the remaining $1.5 million from NBC as Haid was friends with then NBC President Brandon Tartikoff and was starring in the network's popular Hill Street Blues.

=== Casting ===
Emilio Estevez was initially slated to play the role of Rory; however, when the opportunity came for Estevez to direct, write, and star in Wisdom, Estevez left the project and passed the script along to his friend Rob Lowe. Lowe had his manager accept the part and accepted one-twentieth of his usual salary. In order to convincingly portray the intellectually disabled Rory, Lowe attended adult special-needs classes and spent four days working with a speech therapist to perfect the slurred manner of speaking he would use for the audition.

Gregory Peck had initially been cast as Grandpa Dillard, but dropped out and was replaced by Jason Robards.

== Reception ==
Square Dance received mixed reviews from critics and was a box office bomb. However, Lowe was nominated for the Golden Globe Award for Best Supporting Actor – Motion Picture. Vincent Canby of The New York Times cited Lowe's performance as "arresting", while Rita Kempley of The Washington Post felt that Lowe's character of Rory was "played with extraordinary sweetness". Roger Ebert called it "a weary morality play that sinks under the weight of its good intentions."

On April 17, 1988, the film aired on NBC under the title Home Is Where the Heart Is.
