= Sandy Fox =

American voice actress (born 1963)

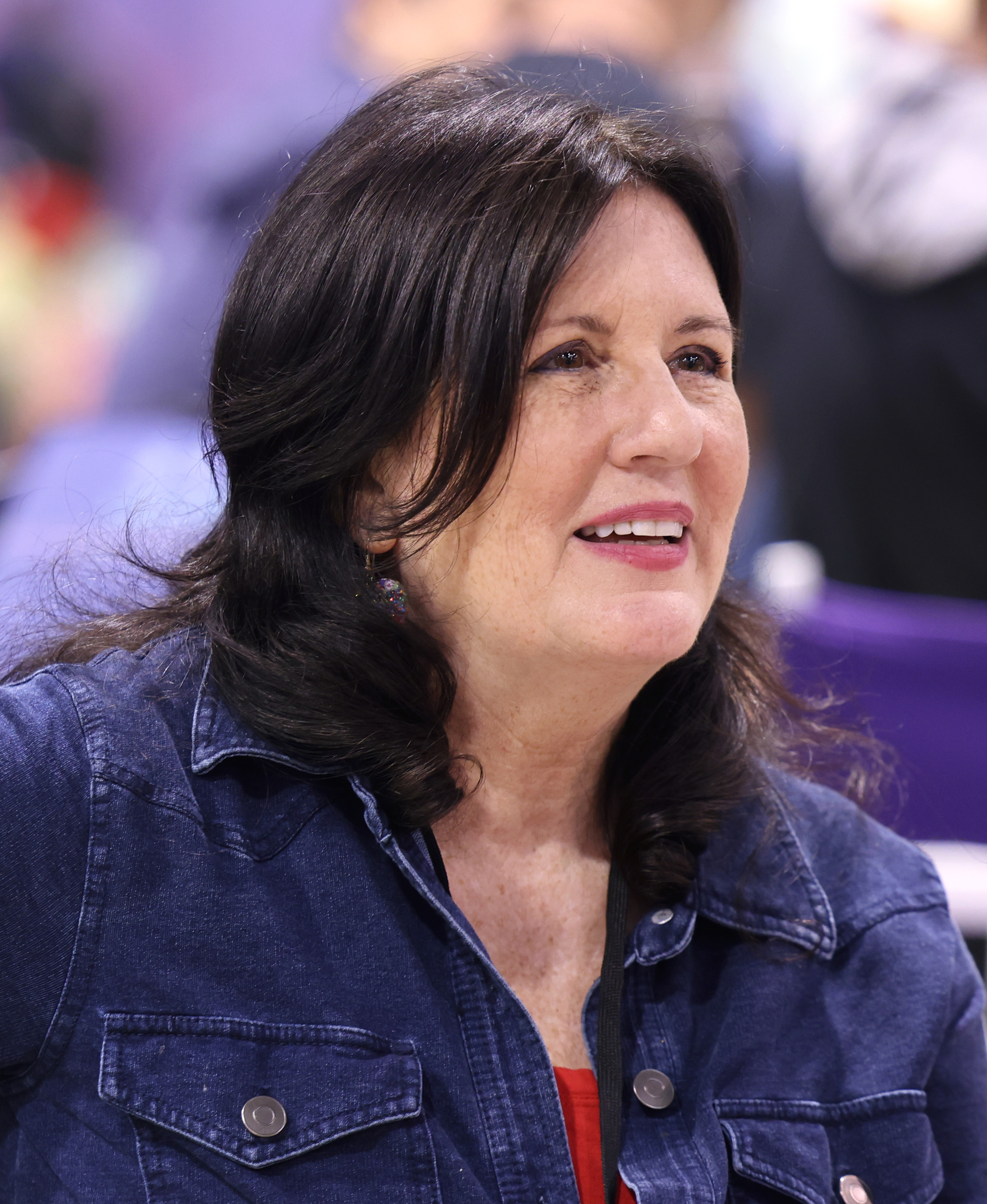
- Fox in 2026
- Born: Sandra Marie Kessler; July 13, 1963 (age 63); Pittsburgh, Pennsylvania, U.S.
- Occupation: Voice actress
- Years active: 1986 – present
- Agent(s): Vox.Inc (Voice Overs), CESD Talent (Convention Appearances)
- Spouse: Lex Lang (m. 2004)
- Website: sandyfox.com

Sandra Marie Fox (née Kessler; born July 13, 1963) is an American voice actress, who has had numerous roles in various animated cartoons, anime, and video games. She portrayed the live-action Betty Boop and has provided her voice for Universal Studios and King Features Syndicate for much of their promotional activities and related media and merchandise from 1991 to 2024. She began voice acting on various animated shows such as The Simpsons, King of the Hill, and Futurama. Her first major roles in anime were as Kiyoko in the Animaze dub of Akira and Lady Aska in Magic Knight Rayearth. Other anime characters include Mina and Momiji in Naruto, Sumomo in Chobits, Tachikoma in Ghost in the Shell: Stand Alone Complex, and Paiway in Vandread. In video game franchises, she provides the English voice of Mistral and A-20 in the .hack series, Peashy in Hyperdimension Neptunia, and Flonne in Disgaea. In cartoons, she voiced Harmony in Hi Hi Puffy AmiYumi and Mipsy Mipson in As Told by Ginger. In 2014, she was announced as the voice of Chibiusa/Black Lady/Sailor Chibi Moon in the Viz Media dubs of Sailor Moon and Sailor Moon Crystal.

== Early life and career ==
Fox was born in Pittsburgh, Pennsylvania on July 13, 1963, and grew up in Swissvale. She performed in musicals in high school, and worked at Kennywood amusement park during some of the summers. In the early 1980s, she worked for the Walt Disney Company in Orlando where she would participate in their live stage shows. She was working as a hostess at a Bennigan's Irish pub when she was asked to audition with the 1920s-themed jazz band The Cocoanut Manor Orchestra as their singer. She sang with the group for 11 years, performing songs done by singers Helen Kane and Annette Henshaw; the former was an inspiration for the Betty Boop character. In 1988, she joined the Orlando Magic's inaugural dance team, and was part of the Magic Girls for three years.

In 1991, she was cast as the official Betty Boop for Universal Studios. She moved to Los Angeles and began performing as Betty Boop at Universal Studios Hollywood, as well as on national and worldwide tours, visiting shows such as Good Morning America and The Rosie O'Donnell Show. In 1998, she voiced Betty Boop for "The Toon Lagoon Betty Boop" attraction at Universal Orlando's Islands of Adventure in addition to voicing Olive Oyl from the Popeye franchise for Popeye & Bluto's Bilge-Rat Barges, a water ride in the same park. In 2012, she joined a Lancome promotion in Paris as the voice of Betty Boop in their commercials.

== Voice-over career ==
Fox was inspired to go into voice acting after having taken a voice-over workshop in 1990 with Sue Blu, a Los Angeles-based animation director and producer. After moving to Los Angeles, she voiced supporting and background characters for The Simpsons, mostly with kids voices and loop groups, which she did for three years. She also voiced characters for Futurama and King of the Hill.

Fox voiced several anime characters, including Sakura in Ninja Cadets; T-AI in a 2001 version of Transformers: Robots in Disguise; Kyoko in the Pioneer/Animaze dub of Akira; Paiway, the ship's nurse in Vandread, Sumomo in Bang Zoom's dub of Chobits. Maya in Burn-Up Scramble and Tachikoma in the Ghost in the Shell: Stand Alone Complex series, Momiji and Mina in Naruto, and Piyoko in Digi Charat. In addition, she voiced Lady Aska, a major character in the second season of Magic Knight Rayearth, a series in which she also rewrote lyrics and sang the theme songs.

In 2003, she voiced the title characters in Omishi Magical Theater Risky Safety and Ground Defense Force! Mao-chan. In his review of Mao-chan, Ryan Mathews of Anime News Network wrote that "Bang Zoom picked the perfect actress to play the lead role. [Fox], the owner of perhaps the cutest "little girl" voice in anime dub acting, is her usual adorable self as M.A.O."

In 2007, she and Lex Lang hosted a Voice Actor Boot Camp at Bang Zoom! Entertainment to help up and coming voice actors get into the business. In 2014, when Viz Media redubbed Sailor Moon and dubbed its new Sailor Moon Crystal series, Fox was chosen to voice Chibiusa.

In video games, she voiced Mistral and A-20 in the .hack video game series, Flonne in various incarnations of Disgaea and Marona in Phantom Brave. She voiced Peashy in the Hyperdimension Neptunia series.

== Personal life and other ventures ==
Fox is married to fellow voice actor Lex Lang. They live in Studio City, California. In 1998 they co-founded the Love Planet Foundation, a non-profit organization which creates educational materials for children on the importance of recycling, world water awareness, and the preservation of the planet. They also created Love Planet Productions, which includes several multimedia projects such as anime presentation shows, toddler shows and products, and Zen programming. In 2006, they founded a bottled spring water business called H2Om Water with Intention, which has received recognition as a sponsor at several events including Sting's Rainforest Foundation Carnegie Hall Concert and the Elevate Film Festival. Fox and Lang are Deepak Chopra meditation instructors.

== Filmography ==
=== Anime ===
List of voice performances in anime
Year	Title	Role	Notes	Source
1998	Battle Athletes series	Various characters	OAV	Resume
1999	Serial Experiments Lain	Myu-Myu		Resume
1999	Cowboy Bebop	Bowhead, Orphan, Pinky		Resume
2000	Ninja Cadets	Sakura	OAV	Resume
2000	Flint the Time Detective	Talen the Pink Squirrel		Resume
2000	Magic Knight Rayearth series	Lady Aska, Hikari, Hikaru's Friend A	Also theme songs	
2000	Dual! Parallel Trouble Adventure	Kazuko Yotsuga		
2001	Nightwalker	Guni		Resume
2001	Mobile Suit Gundam: The 08th MS Team	Child, Sweeter Twin	OAV	Resume
2001	Hand Maid May	Miyuki Zin		Resume
2001	Vampire Princess Miyu	Various characters	TV series, grouped under "Also featuring voice talents of"	
2001	Saint Tail	Various characters	grouped under "English language cast"	
2001	Transformers: Robots in Disguise	T-AI		Press
2002	Vandread series	Celtic Midori, Paiway Underberg		Press
2002	Love Hina	Moé		Resume
2002	Shinzo	Este		Resume
2002	eX-Driver	Girl A, Student	OAV	Resume
2002	Hello Kitty's Paradise	Lacey the Raccoon, Jody		Resume
2003	.hack//SIGN	A-20, Mistral		
2003	Argento Soma	Harriet "Hattie" Bartholomew		Resume
2003	Ai Yori Aoshi	Akiko, Chararin, Utsume, others		Resume
2003	Chobits	Sumomo	Also OAV, specials	Press
2003	Rurouni Kenshin		Theme song performance: "Freckles"	Press
2003	Please Teacher!	Maho Kazami, Marie	OAV and TV series	Press
2003	Geneshaft	Tiki Musicanova		Press
2003	Omishi Magical Theater Risky Safety	Risky		
2003	Heat Guy J	Monica Gabriel, others		Resume
2003	Mao-chan	Mao Onigawara		
2004	.hack//Legend of the Twilight	Mireille		Resume
2004	Rave Master	Reina (young)		Resume
2004	Angel Tales	Kurumi the Hamster		
2004	Burn Up Scramble!	Maya Jinguu		Resume
2004	Ghost in the Shell: Stand Alone Complex	Tachikoma	Also 2nd GIG, Tachikomatic Days shorts	Press
2004	Please Twins!	Marie	OAV and TV series	Resume
2005	Hanaukyo Maid Team: La Verite	Cynthia Landlavizar / Grace		Resume
2005	Saiyuki Reload	Seika, Shion, Sibling's mother	Eps. 1,13	Resume
2005	Ultra Maniac	Luna		Resume
2005	Scrapped Princess	Cin		
2005	Kyo Kara Maoh!	Yuri (Young)		Resume
2005	Di Gi Charat	Pyocola		Resume
2005	Naruto	Momiji, Mina		Press
2005	Mars Daybreak	Shie		Resume
2005	.hack//Unison	Mistral	OAV	Resume
2005	Leave it to Piyoko!	Pyocola Analogue III / Piyoko		Resume
2006	Haré+Guu	Marie		
2006	Immortal Grand Prix	Amy	microseries	Resume
2006	Kannazuki no Miko	Nekoko		
2006	Karas	Amefuriko	OAV	Resume
2006	Saiyuki Reload Gunlock	Kid, Daughter	Eps. 10,13,14	Resume
2006	Green Green	Sanae Minami		Resume
2006	Disgaea	Flonne		Press
2007	MÄR	Loco		Resume
2008	Bleach	Ritz		Press
2009	Naruto Shippūden	Naho	Ep. 196	Resume
2011	Durarara!!	Haruna Niekawa		Resume
2015–19	Sailor Moon	Chibiusa/ Sailor Chibi Moon/Black Lady	Viz Media dub	
2015	Aldnoah.Zero	Eddelrittuo		
2016	Sailor Moon Crystal	Chibiusa/ Sailor Chibi Moon/Black Lady		
2016	Pokémon Generations	Courtney	ONA; Episode: The Vision	Press
2017	Mobile Suit Gundam SEED	Haro	NYAV Post dub	
2018	Granblue Fantasy The Animation	Vyrn		

=== Film ===
List of voice performances in direct-to-video films and specials
Year	Title	Role	Notes	Source
1998	The Land Before Time VI: The Secret of Saurus Rock	Dinah		
2000	Catnapped!	Meeko	Animaze dub	Resume
2001	Akira	Kyoko	Animaze dub	Press
2004	Mobile Suit Gundam F91	Kochun Hein, Leah Mariba	Bandai/Bang Zoom dub	Resume

List of voice performances in feature films
Year	Title	Role	Notes	Source
2014	Maleficent	Fairies and creatures		Press
2016	Robinson Crusoe aka The Wild Life	Epi		
2017	Sailor Moon R: The Movie	Chibiusa	Viz Dub; Limited theatrical release	
2018	Sailor Moon S: The Movie	Chibiusa / Sailor Chibi Moon	Viz Dub; Limited theatrical release	
2018	Sailor Moon SuperS: The Movie	Chibiusa / Sailor Chibi Moon	Viz Dub; Limited theatrical release	

=== Animation ===
List of voice performances in animation
Year	Title	Role	Notes	Source
1991–94	The Simpsons	Various characters		
1995–96	Eek! the Cat	Sandee Heap	("Klutter!" segment)	Credits
1997–10	King of the Hill	Various characters		Press
1998	Toonsylvania	Darla Dolly		
1998	Mad Jack the Pirate	Magic Pink Fairy, others		
1999–13	Futurama	Various characters		Press
2000	As Told by Ginger	Mipsy Mipson		
2001–05	Jay Jay the Jet Plane	Tracy, Snuffy, Tuffy	(as Marie Danielle; replacing Gina Ribisi)	Website
2003–07	My Life as a Teenage Robot	Melody Locus		Tweet
2004–06	Hi Hi Puffy AmiYumi	Harmony	Recurring role	Resume
2019	Miraculous: Tales of Ladybug & Cat Noir	Roaar, Various characters		Tweet

=== Video games ===
List of voice performances in video games
Year	Title	Role	Notes	Source
1998	Brave Fencer Musashi	Princess Fillet	As Marie Danielle	
2003–04	.hack video game series	Mistral, A-20	Infection, Mutation, Outbreak and Quarantine	
2003	Disgaea: Hour of Darkness	Flonne		
2003	Phantom Brave	Marona		
2003	Go! Go! Hypergrind			
2005	Makai Kingdom: Chronicles of the Sacred Tome			Press
2006	Atelier Iris 2: The Azoth of Destiny			Press
2006	Tales of the Abyss	Mieu		
2006	.hack//G.U. vol.1//Rebirth	Asta		
2007	Atelier Iris 3: Grand Phantasm			
2007	Elsword	Aisha Landar		
2008	Soulcalibur IV		Press	
2010	Disgaea Infinite	Flonne		Press
2011	Disgaea 4: A Promise Unforgotten	Flonne		Resume
2012	Rise of the Dragonian Era			Press
2013	Pac-Man and the Ghostly Adventures	Cyli		
2013	Hyperdimension Neptunia series	Peashy (Yellow Heart)	Starting with Victory, then Re;birth1 and Re;Birth2	
2015	Bravely Second: End Layer	Minette		
2018	Tales of Vesperia	Patty Fleur	Definitive Edition	Tweet
2019	God Eater 3			
2020	Granblue Fantasy Versus	Vyrn		
2020	The Legend of Heroes: Trails of Cold Steel IV	Renne Bright		
2023	Granblue Fantasy Versus: Rising	Vyrn		
2024	Granblue Fantasy: Relink	Vyrn		

=== Other voice roles ===
List of appearances on television and film
Year	Title	Role	Notes	Source
1994	Old MacDonald's Sing-a-Long Farm	Lucinda Chick	Live-action pre-school series, Voice role	Tweet
	LeapFrog toys and videos	Lily		Website

=== Other live-action roles ===
List of live-action appearances on television and film
Year	Title	Role	Notes	Source
2002	Whammy! The All-New Press Your Luck	Contestant	Three episodes; Finalist in the Whammy Tournament of Champions	
