= The Terrible Thunderlizards =

- The Terrible Thunderlizards title card
- Genre: Animated segment
- Created by: Savage Steve Holland; Bill Kopp
- Written by: Savage Steve Holland; Bill Kopp; Kati Rocky
- Directed by: John Halfpenny (1993–95); Jamie Whitney (1995–97)
- Starring: Savage Steve Holland; Bill Kopp; Jason Priestley; Corey Feldman; Curtis Armstrong; Charlie Adler; Kurtwood Smith; Brad Garrett
- Theme music composer: Dee Snider
- Composer: Nathan Wang
- Countries of origin: United States; Canada
- No. of episodes: 36 (list of episodes)

Production
- Executive producer: Savage Steve Holland
- Producers: Patrick Loubert; Michael Hirsh; Clive A. Smith
- Running time: 11 minutes
- Production companies: Savage Studios Ltd.; Nelvana; Fox Children's Productions 20th Century Fox Television

Original release
- Network: Fox Kids; YTV
- Release: November 20, 1993 – July 28, 1997

The Terrible Thunderlizards is an animated segment that aired in the United States as part of Eek! Stravaganza on the Fox Kids programming block, and in Canada on YTV. It aired from November 20, 1993, to July 28, 1997. The series was originally intended as a spin-off from Eek! The Cat. The segment was supposed to air at the start of Eek's second season in September 1993, but due to production delays, it began in November. Like Eek!, the segment was also a co-production of Nelvana and Fox Kids in association with Savage Studios Ltd. Dee Snider, of the band Twisted Sister, composed the show's theme song.

Ownership of the series, alongside Eek! The Cat and Klutter!, passed to Disney in 2001 when Disney acquired Fox Kids Worldwide.

== Plot ==
The series chronicles the misadventures of a trio of dinosaur mercenaries released from incarceration after they were falsely accused of helping an enemy Thuggosaur in a time of war when they actually found it injured. They are charged by General Galapagos with the task of eliminating two primitive human beings after scientists realize that, if humanity is allowed to multiply, it will mean the end of dinosaur supremacy. Despite their superior size and firepower and the obliviousness of their targets, the mercenaries always fail to kill the humans with comic results. Their usual preferred method of attacking the humans is throwing bombs full of bees, which upon impact would usually then go after the dinosaurs, forcing them to run to water to get away from the bees. Although the mercenaries fail to eliminate the humans, they have better luck in defending Jurassic City from enemies, and are successful in dangerous missions such as rescuing the kidnapped daughter of the president, which might explain why the team is allowed to continue working and not return to prison.

== Characters ==
=== Doc Tari ===
Doc Tari or "Doc" (voiced by Savage Steve Holland) is a Parasaurolophus and the leader of the Thunderlizards team. He has a hole in the center of his crest that contains many gadgets such as a buzz-saw and a grappling hook. More often than not, he is the team's most focused member, but is every bit as unfocused as Kutter and Squatt when not chasing the humans or performing missions. Doc both in voice and mannerisms is a parody of various Arnold Schwarzenegger film characters such as John Matrix from Commando, Dutch from Predator, and with a bit of the Terminator.

=== Day Z. Kutter ===
Day Z. Kutter or "Kutter" (voiced by Bill Kopp) is a Styracosaurus and the second-in-command of the team. As his name suggests, he is good with knives, being the master with knives. He is often shown fooling around with Squatt and, at times, requires Doc's quick wit and strength to help him focus.

=== Bo Diddley Squatt ===
Bo Diddley Squatt or "Squatt" (voiced by Jason Priestley in 1994-1996, Corey Feldman in 1996-1997) is the third member of the team and their top sniper. He is an Allosaurus. He is the typical "dim-witted clumsy screw-up" character, although in some instances, he has been fairly competent. Squatt is often used as the volunteer to assess dangerous situations. His catchphrase involves asking if a particular event would qualify as a "bad thing", to which Kutter or occasionally Doc would respond, "Yes Squatt, that would fit nicely into the bad things category!".

=== General Galapagos ===
General Galapagos

General Galapagos (voiced by Kurtwood Smith) is a Tyrannosaurus who is the boss of the Thunderlizards. He oversees the missions of the Terrible Thunderlizards to hunt down the humans but is continually frustrated that they never accomplish their mission.

=== Dr. Steggy ===
Dr. Steggy is a Stegosaurus scientist (voiced by Charlie Adler) who works for the Jurassic City Military. He has a nephew called Huckleberry (voiced by Cam Clarke) who befriends the humans, Bill and Scooter.

=== Mr. T-Rex ===
Mr. T-Rex is Galapagos's best soldier. He is a Tyrannosaurus who is based on and voiced by Mr. T. Mr. T-Rex is a parody of Mr. T's characters Clubber Lang from Rocky III and B. A. Baracus from The A-Team, even using some of Mr. T's popular catch phrases. His anger frequently gets him into trouble resulting in the Thunderlizards having to save him.

=== Nate the Dragon ===
Nate the Dragon (voiced by Nathan Wang) is a Velociraptor who is a stealth and martial arts expert using uses a Bo staff.

=== El Gordo ===
El Gordo is a small Ceratosaurus who is an expert in camouflage and can disappear by sticking a plant in his hat.

=== Bill & Scooter ===
Bill (voiced by Charlie Adler) and Scooter (voiced by Curtis Armstrong) are the two humans—Homo sapiens, called "mankinds"—that the Thunderlizards try to eliminate so they will never evolve into the humans of today. Both Bill and Scooter wear animal skins and shoes. While both are aware that the Thunderlizards are trying to kill them, they have no idea why, being unaware of the anti-human prejudice from Dinosaur City. In spite of this, they befriend Huckleberry, who initially wished to keep them as pets, in the episode "Ice Age Capades".

=== Babs ===
Babs is the first female human and was created by dinosaur scientists using recovered genetic material from Bill and Scooter spliced together, then doubling the X-chromosome to create a female. Her name comes from the acronym for Bio-engineered Animated Biped Specimen (BABS). The Thunderlizards' goal was to use Babs to entrap the two men for the dinosaurs. However, Babs is more intelligent than them and abandons her original mission to live alone in the jungle. In later appearances, Babs tries to use Bill and Scooter to further her aspirations.

=== The Thuggosaurs ===
The Thuggosaurs are a race of black-hooded skeletal undead dinosaurs that live in the X-Zone on the outskirts of Jurassic City. The Thuggosaurs are a parody of the hooded and mutated survivors living in the Forbidden Zone from the films Beneath the Planet of the Apes and Battle for the Planet of the Apes. Thuggo (voiced by Brad Garrett in most appearances, understudied by Kurtwood Smith in four episodes) is a Megalosaurus who is the leader of the Thuggosaurs. Biff is Thuggo's wimpy, flower-loving, second-in-command.

=== The Primates ===
The primates are a group of simians who co-exist in the X-Zone like Bill and Scooter, whom they regard as backward and primitive. They are more advanced than the humans, living in condominiums and with an advanced social structure.
