= Klutter! =

- Klutter title
- Genre: Segment
- Created by: David Silverman; Savage Steve Holland
- Voices of: Kirk Thatcher; Cam Clarke; Savage Steve Holland; Sandy Fox; Michael Zorek; Halle Stanford; Kathy Ireland; David Silverman; Dan Castellaneta; Amy Heckerling
- Country of origin: United States
- No. of episodes: 8 (list of episodes)

Production
- Executive producers: David Silverman; Savage Steve Holland; Phil Roman
- Running time: 11 minutes
- Production companies: Savage Studios; Film Roman; Fox Children's Productions

Original release
- Network: Fox (Fox Kids)
- Release: September 9, 1995 – February 8, 1996

Klutter is an American animated segment that ran on Eek! Stravaganza's fourth season from 1995 to 1996 on the Fox Kids block. It was created by David Silverman and Savage Steve Holland. The segment was animated by the same people who used to work for Fox's The Critic, which was canceled that year. The executive producers were David Silverman, Savage Steve Holland, and Phil Roman. Unlike the Eek and Thunderlizard segments, this was a Fox Children's Productions and Savage Studios co-production in association with Film Roman for animation. Eight episodes were produced.

Ownership of the series, alongside Eek! The Cat and The Terrible Thunderlizards, passed to Disney in 2001 when Disney acquired Fox Kids Worldwide.

== Plot ==
The segment follows Ryan and Wade Heap, who cannot have a pet because their father is allergic to pets. They decide to make a pet on their own, out of a pile of junk (Klutter) by static electricity. There are other characters in the show, like Sandee Heap, who was lonely at first, before Klutter came into their lives. They went on mysteries, a la Scooby-Doo, to save animals and solve crimes.

== Characters ==
=== Klutter ===
Klutter (vocal effects provided by Kirk Thatcher) is the eponymous star of the show. He is a pet made from a pile of clothes from static electricity by Ryan and Wade Heap. Klutter is portrayed mostly as a dog in nature, mainly due to his habit of licking other characters' faces (with Vanna being the most common victim of this), and alerting the gang of inevitable danger or an ensuing disaster. Klutter is sometimes ignored by Ryan, Wade and the gang while alerting or rescuing somebody, squashed by heavy objects, hauled off to the dump or other unsavory locations, etc. The parents of the Heap children are unaware of his sentience, incorrectly passing him off as just a mess of "clutter" that the kids bring around.

=== Ryan Heap ===
Ryan Heap (voiced by Cam Clarke) is the oldest of the Heap children. He wants to be a reporter just like his father, but his father laughs at him because he believes the things Ryan tells him about are not real. He's the unofficial leader of the gang. His hairdo would change different colors in almost every episode.

=== Wade Heap ===
Wade Heap (voiced by Savage Steve Holland) is the middle child with a mild attitude. He does not say much and is very soft-spoken, carrying a distinctive low voice.

=== Kopp ===
Kopp (voiced by Kirk R Thatcher) is a character that is very crazy, paranoid, and sometimes lazy. He is an underachiever who has a not so secret crush on Vanna. He also has frequent bad luck and is the segments' main target for slapstick. It is known that Kopp was based on the real Bill Kopp, who could not participate to work on Klutter at the time.

=== Sandee Heap ===
Sandee Heap (voiced by Sandy Fox) is the youngest of the Heaps. She is a preschooler that was previously lonely until Klutter came around and brightened up her day. She is often noted for her extremely high voice.

=== Vanna Erving ===
Vanna Erving (voiced by Halle Stanford) is Ryan, Wade, and Sandee's neighbor that lives next door. She is a teacher's pet, bright, and sometimes mean and bossy. She cannot stand Kopp or Klutter at times for their silly antics and actions. Despite her sometimes cold nature, she loves animals and treats them with affection.

=== John Heap ===
John Heap (voiced by David Silverman) is the father of Ryan, Wade and Sandee Heap. He is a news reporter that most of the time claims that the town he lives in is dull, although exciting (and scary) things happens when he does not look.

=== Andrea Heap ===
Andrea Heap (voiced by Kathy Ireland) is the mother of Ryan, Wade and Sandee Heap. She wants Ryan and Wade to focus on growing up (and picking up their Klutter off the floor). While she can be strict at times, she loves the children at the end of the day. She can be a bit unaware at times like her husband. She is also a library employee.

=== Mel Erving ===
Mel Erving (voiced by Dan Castellaneta) is the cranky, bitter father of Vanna Erving.

=== Nel Erving ===
Nel Erving (voiced by Amy Heckerling) is the cheerful, doting mother of Vanna Erving.

== Cast ==
- Kirk Thatcher .... Klutter
- Cam Clarke .... Ryan Heap
- Savage Steve Holland .... Wade Heap
- Sandy Fox .... Sandee Heap
- Michael Zorek .... Kopp
- Halle Stanford .... Vanna Ervin
- David Silverman .... John Heap
- Kathy Ireland .... Andrea Heap
- Dan Castellaneta .... Mel Ervin/Additional Voices
- Amy Heckerling .... Nel Ervin
- Gary Owens .... Additional Voices
- Brad Garrett .... Additional Voices
- Charlie Adler .... Additional Voices
