= Michael Zorek =

American film and television actor (born 1960)

- Born: May 25, 1960 (age 66); New York City, New York, United States
- Occupation: Actor
- Years active: 1983–1995
- Spouse: Shelly Friedland
- Children: 2

Michael Zorek is an American film and television actor who has appeared in films and television series such as Private School, Family Ties, The Facts of Life, Hot Moves, The Woman in Red, Camp Nowhere and Teen Wolf Too.

== Personal life ==
In June 2002, Zorek was featured in an article in The New York Times about life as a stay-at-home father after leaving his job as an account executive at a Manhattan public relations firm. In May 2013, The Huffington Post published a follow-up article by the same author of The New York Times piece, Lisa Belkin.

Zorek's son Jeremy is also an actor and performed in a 2011 national tour of Billy Elliot, and his daughter Diana has acted in an AT&T commercial.

== Filmography ==
=== Film ===
Year	Title	Role	Notes
1983	Private School	Bubba Beauregard	
1984	The Woman in Red	Shelly	
1984	Hot Moves	Barry	
1987	Teen Wolf Too	Squirrely Assistant	
1988	Spellcaster	Harlan	
1994	Camp Nowhere	Chez Cheez Guy	

=== Television ===
Year	Title	Role	Notes
1983	High School U.S.A.	Chuckie Dipple	TV movie
1984	Young Hearts	Beef	TV movie
1984	Diff'rent Strokes	Benjamin	Episode: "Undercover Lover"
1984	The Facts of Life	Victor	Episodes: "Talk, Talk, Talk", "Slices of Life"
1984–1986	Family Ties	Flaum	Episodes: "Starting Over", "Best Man"
1985	Newhart	Mr. Duncan	Episode: "The Prodigal Darryl"
1986	Life with Lucy	Pizza Delivery Man	Episode: "World's Greatest Grandma"
1989	Matlock	Cultist #2	Episode: "The Cult"
1995	Can't Hurry Love	Man	Episode: "Glove Story"
1995	Eek! The Cat	Kopp (voice: Klutter! segment)	Main role
