= Barbi Twins =

American identical twin sister models

Shane and Sia Barbi
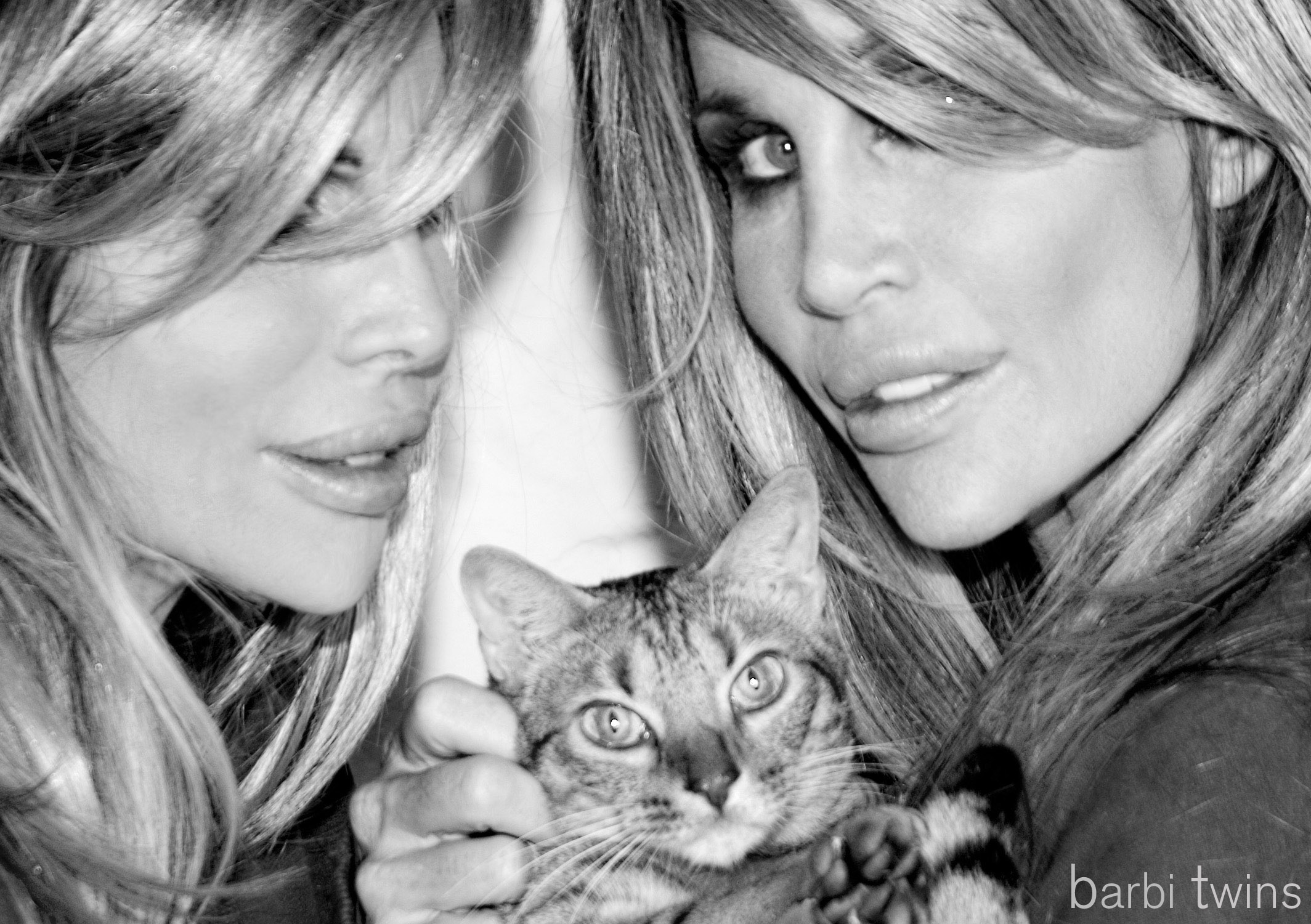
- Shane and Sia Barbi circa 2001
- Born: Shane and Sia Carlson; April 2, 1963 (age 63); San Diego, California, U.S.
- Other name: Barbi Twins
- Years active: 1990s–present
- Spouse(s): Shane: Ken Wahl (m. 1997)
- Website: Official website

Shane and Sia Barbi (née Carlson; born April 2, 1963), popularly known as The Barbi Twins, are American identical twins, cover models, co-authors, and frequently nude spokespersons as part of their animal rights advocacy.

== Modeling ==
Shane and Sia began modeling at the age of seven when they posed for a layout in the Sears mail-order catalog. As adults, their career has included fashion and mainly pin-up modeling. The Los Angeles Times did a cover story about the Barbi Twins when their billboard went up on Sunset Boulevard in 1989 immediately catapulting them to worldwide attention. In 1989, 1990, and early 1991, they modeled for Chanel, Thierry Mugler, Jean Paul Gaultier, John Galliano and others.

=== Playboy ===
According to their 2001 E! True Hollywood Story, the billboard, and the press that came from it, caught the eye of Hugh Hefner. The twins were put on the cover of Playboy magazine in the September 1991 issue, which broke records by selling out in less than two weeks. In an unprecedented move, Hefner erected a billboard to promote the Barbi Twins and their second Playboy issue (which also broke sales records).

=== Other print work ===
USA Today said that the twins career brought them "caviar dreams and champagne life styles of the rich and famous". Playboy called their covers "legendary" and credited their subsequent television appearances with "the highest ratings", remarking that the twins became Hollywood landmarks and global obsessions. The twins have also generated a degree of controversy – a Saturday morning cartoon and an MTV show were criticized for being "too sexy" or "too controversial".

Magazines and tabloids called them everything from "the sexiest twins alive" and "the best selling calendar models of the world" (Cosmopolitan UK) to referring to them as both "bizarre and bulimic" and "sexual icons and America's cartoon sweethearts" (Entertainment Weekly) They were a favorite for cover models appearing on the covers and inside not only Playboy but mainstream national and international magazines including Cosmopolitan and Redbook. Newspapers, magazines and tabloids including USA TODAY.

Shane Barbi was among the many notable quotables when Newsweek's "Overheard" section (syndicated from the New York Post, Page Six) picked up a quote from her during an interview, "You can ask us about our cup size or favorite positions but please no personal questions."

Redbook magazine took excerpts from the book Diana's Boys, which reveals how Prince William had his first crush on the Barbi Twins.

After four years of the "best selling calendars", photographs from a photo shoot were stolen from a NY film lab and "held for ransom" but were later returned.

In 2011 were featured and voted as one of MAXIM's Hottest Famous Twins, were featured in numerous movie posters on behalf of animal causes (see Animal Activism below) and on covers and featured articles in True Cowboy Magazine.

=== Merchandising ===
Shane and Sia posed together in several internationally distributed Barbi Twins calendars from 1993 to 2007. After the success of their 1993 calendar the "Barbi Mania" continued with dozens of posters, a comic-art calendar and two comic books. Other merchandise such as promotional trading cards, postcards, gift cards, gift wrap, mugs, lighters and just about any product that could have their images (or more specifically bodies) stamped on it were for sale. The Daily Star UK ran a comic strip called "The Barbi Twins", and featuring the twin models with psychic abilities. Gift shops worldwide contained Barbi Twin products and every Spencer Gifts had dedicated a corner to Barbi Twin merchandise as E! True Hollywood Story reported.

=== Film and television ===
48 Hours did a special on the Barbi Twins in 2002 on their eating disorders, and the E! True Hollywood Story did a biography on the twins in 2001. They also had several guest appearances on talk shows for television and radio, such as The Geraldo Rivera Show and The Howard Stern Show. The twins made several appearances along with William Shatner, John Landis, and many others in the American animated series Eek! The Cat playing twin rocket scientists, "Dr. Shane and Dr. Sia". In 2007, they received an associate producer credit on Curt Johnson's animal activist documentary titled Your Mommy Kills Animals, which received highly acclaimed reviews from Variety, The Hollywood Reporter and Los Angeles Times.

In 2010 the twins again showed their support for the animal community and were featured in the movie Skin Trade.

In 2012 the twins announced their first feature documentary called I HAVE A DREAM about breed discrimination. Breed discrimination was at the root of the recent death of Lennox, a dog that was destroyed just for being a breed too similar to a pit bull.

=== Barbi v. Flynt ===
In November 2003, the Barbi Twins sued Larry Flynt and Hustler magazine for shots taken at Playboy studios that eventually found their way into the January 2004 issue of Hustler without permission. The twins had a vitamin line they were planning to be introduced in 2004 and they claimed that the pictures, allegedly taken by Shane's then-husband Ken Wahl, were never meant to be published. They sued for both the pictures and a fictional story that appeared in Hustler as the Barbi Twins claimed it ruined their health image. However, the twins' lawsuit was not successful, as Flynt possessed a valid photo release signed by the twins.

== Personal lives and history ==
=== Parents ===
The twins are the daughters of property developer Bob Carlson (d. October 2001), a devout Christian, and Marsha Barbi, a former Miss Ohio, but their parents divorced when the twins were just two. The twins believe that their mother was always a lesbian and when she left their father, she and they traveled to West Hollywood where Marsha became an "outspoken lesbian feminist". According to the twins, Marsha had numerous lesbian lovers including some quite famous women. Then she met closeted singer Dusty Springfield in 1975 and the two women lived together for two years.

=== Spouses ===
Shane Barbi married actor Ken Wahl in 1997.

=== Health issues ===
The twins struggled with bulimia. According to their E! True Hollywood Story and a candid interview in USA TODAY their bulimia and insecurities caused them to be obsessed with crash-dieting, bingeing and purging, abusing laxatives and destructive exercise routines for up to 10 hours a day. Their disorders manifested into agoraphobia preventing them from attending the Hollywood major premieres and invitations they received, causing them to cancel events, and to turn down offers for their own television shows and movies, and even dates with their high-profile suitors.

During their recovery, the twins armed themselves with degrees in health and nutrition, and began lecturing in 2000 on "How to eat to live, not live to eat". They lectured at the Learning Annex, universities and high schools as well as on radio, television and on-line. In early 2001, they came out to the nation on the CBS television program 48HRS in a piece about eating disorders, entitled "Slim Chance". They also shared their recovery story in a chapter in a celebrity addiction book called Feeding the Fame.

The twins' first health and fitness book, Dying To Be Healthy: A Breakthrough Diet, Nutrition and Self Help Guide (1999), tells the story of their struggles with eating disorders and how they overcame it. Their second book, The Eco Anti-Diet, Plus Confession (2006), helps people understand how to be "eco and animal friendly" while being healthy and fit. 100% of the proceeds of the books go to animal charities.

=== Miscellaneous ===
By the year 2000 the twins began using their modeling career to help show support and draw focus on other issues they felt important, including publishing books on fitness and health issues, showing their support for the military with their patriotic images and words of support, and animal rights.

== Animal activism ==
=== Early years ===
According to the twins, their interest in animal activism began in childhood, after experiencing, at their father's ranch, animals they'd befriended and named would end up going to slaughter. In response, they drafted a heartfelt manifesto they called "Civil Rights for Animals".

=== Website ===
The twins founded a website for animal activism called TheKittyLiberationFront.org, which has now become TwinBunnies.com, and help animal charities and rescue groups worldwide, volunteer with shelters for walking and rehabilitating dogs, participate in the TNR (Trap, Neuter and Return). They made a calendar featuring shelter animals called "Pinup Pets", which was to support the hurricane animal rescue efforts (as seen in their documentary Your Mommy Kills Animals).

In a 2009 article by Fox News called the twins "the Willie Nelson of pin-up girls", interviewing the twins where they spoke of how they (the twins) use their "seven and a half minutes each of fame" to speak out for animals. They participate in animal protests, such as anti-pet shops, anti-puppy mill, anti-circus, and anti-animal experimentation (vivisection) and are vegan. They held a vigil for pets lost during the pet food poisoning that occurred that same year. They also help lobby animal bills, such as the pet food safety bill.

=== Wild horses ===
In 2009 they became very active in lobbying in favor of the ROAM act for wild horses along with Willie Nelson, and continued their support speaking openly about the horse slaughter ban, the ban on de-clawing and the fight against factory farms and animal cruelty.

=== Marine life ===
In 2010 they helped bring public awareness to the ban on seal hunting in Canada by doing a media blitz to help end the brutality of seal hunting, the dangers to the sea turtles and other endangered species affected by the BP oil spill, and helped lobby and pass HR5566, the Animal Crush Video Prohibition Act Bill (banning violent images against animals on websites).

=== Film and video ===
The Twins use their celebrity status in every way they can including offering their images up in posters displaying their "wacky humor and good looks", such as their 2010 posters to support causes such as the Anti Fur movie Skin Trade and the cruelty that happens in the dairy industry in the documentary Earthlings.=, and their 2011 covers and featured articles in True Cowboy Magazine and their continuing fight to save the wild horses (February and April 2011 issues).

=== Other efforts ===
The twins participate in animal rescue projects. In 2011, they worked the Animal Welfare Institute to support the ban on horse slaughter. and appeared in the documentary The Petition about the issue.

==== Finding Luka Magnotta ====
In 2012, the twins spearheaded a movement to track down a person posting online videos of killing kittens, believed to be Luka Magnotta. They have been searching for him since 2008. Their search ended after his capture in 2012.

== Publications ==
=== Books ===
- Barbi, Sia and Greg Gorman (photographer). Dying To Be Healthy: Millennium Dieting and Nutrition. Pentimento Entertainment, 1999. ISBN 1-892676-11-7
  - Reprinted as: Dying To Be Healthy: A Breakthrough Diet, Nutrition and Self-Help Guide. 2nd Edition. Triumph Books, 2001. ISBN 1-892049-42-2
- Conte, Robert. History of the Barbi Twins. Studio Books, 1998. ISBN 1-890313-01-7
- The Barbi Twins. The Eco Anti-Diet, plus confessions AuthorHouse, 2006 ISBN 1-4259-2722-X

=== Calendars ===
- Barbi Twins: Shane and Sia – 1993 Calendar
- The Barbi Twins 1995 Swimsuit Comic Art Calendar Topps Comics, 1994
  - Artists include John Byrne, Adam Hughes, Julie Bell, Miran Kim, Linser, et al.
- Best of the Barbi Twins 1997 Calendar. H & H Global Inc.
- Barbi Twins 2000 Health & Fitness Calendar. Pentimento Entertainment, 1999
- "Barbi Twins" calendars for the years 2002 through 2007

=== Comic book ===
- Conte, Robert, Peter Hsu, Matt Haley, Fastner and Larson. The Barbi Twins Adventures. Topps Comics.

== See also ==
- List of people in Playboy 1990–1999
- List of twins
- List of animal rights advocates
