= Savage Steve Holland =

American filmmaker (born 1959 or 1960)

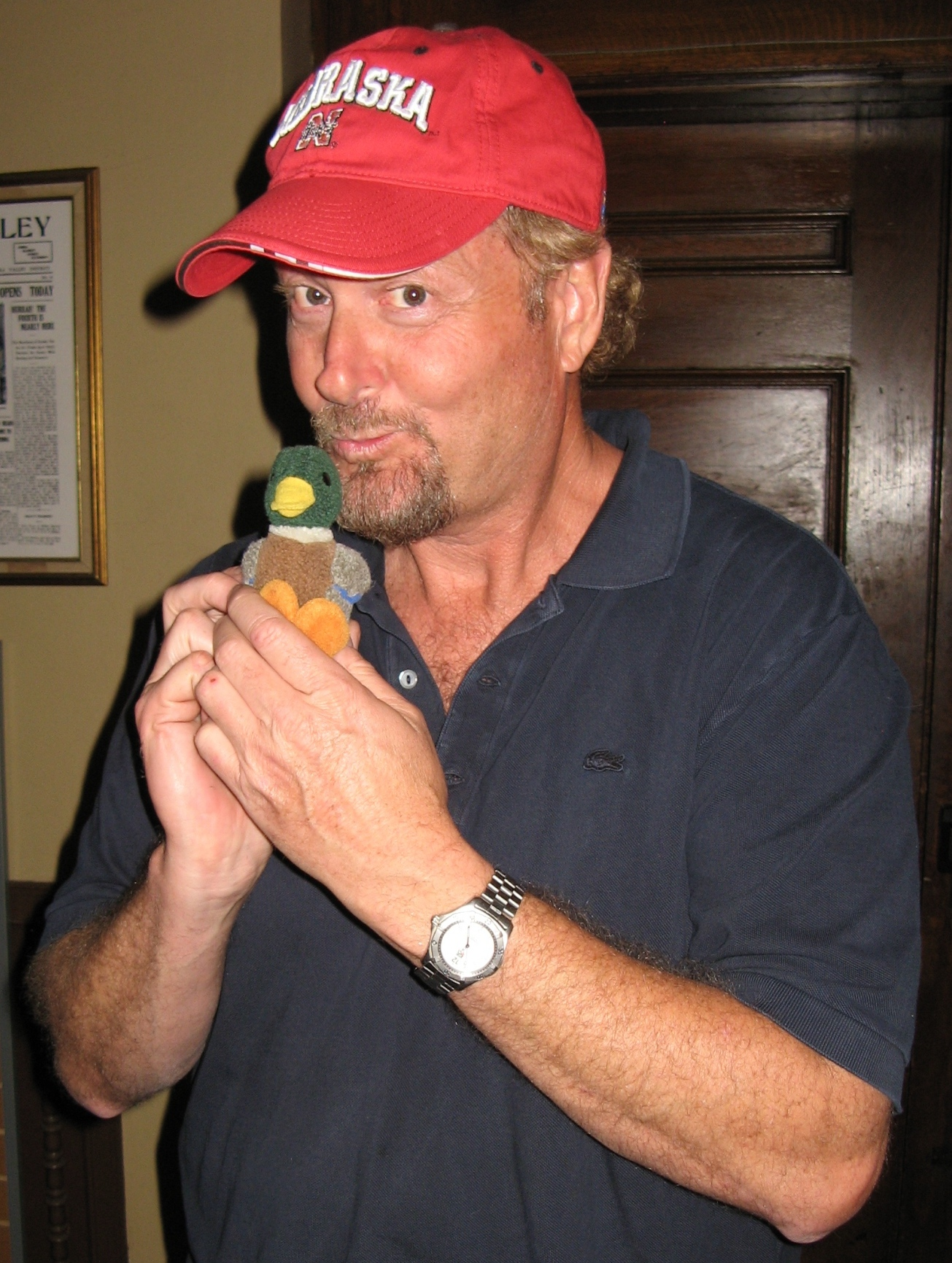
- Holland at a screening of Better Off Dead in San Francisco in 2009
- Born: 1959 or 1960 (age 66–67); Albuquerque, New Mexico, U.S.
- Occupations: Film director, writer, producer, animator, voice actor
- Years active: 1983–present
- Children: 2

Savage Steve Holland (born 1959 or 1960) is an American film and television director, writer, producer, animator, and actor most known for directing Better Off Dead (1985) and One Crazy Summer (1986), starring John Cusack. He also directed the film How I Got into College (1989), and animated the "Whammy" on the game show Press Your Luck. He later went on to create and produce Eek! the Cat and The Terrible Thunderlizards for Fox Kids.

Holland now manages his own studio, Savage Studios Ltd., and directs shows for Disney Channel and Nickelodeon.

== Biography ==
From a young age, Holland had an avid interest in animation, and went to the California Institute of the Arts. While there, he became more interested in filmmaking and made a semi-autobiographical short titled My 11-Year-Old Birthday Party, which played at some minor film festivals and ended up opening the LA Film Festival. Another one of his student projects, Going Nowhere Fast (1980), was exhibited at the Museum of Modern Art show Tomorrowland: CalArts in Moving Pictures. Through Henry Winkler, who saw his work and liked it, Holland soon landed a deal to direct his first feature.

In 1985 and 1986, Holland directed the teen comedy films Better Off Dead and One Crazy Summer respectively, back-to-back. Both starred John Cusack before he rose to fame. Upon release, they were financial bombs but quickly found an audience through television reruns on HBO and home video rentals.

Subsequently, Holland struggled to find work in Hollywood and took on a work-for-hire job directing How I Got into College (1989), after the original director had dropped out last minute. According to Holland, the film "seemed a little doomed from the start", and ended up doing poorly as well.

How I Got Into College was the last film Holland made that had a theatrical release. He instead turned his attention toward television production; directing children's shows such as The New Adventures of Beans Baxter, Encyclopedia Brown and Lizzie McGuire. He would return to his roots in animation with Fox's Eek! The Cat.

In 2007, Holland wrote a script for a new film called The Big 1-3, and was attached to begin production that fall. Unfortunately, he wasn't able to successfully "sell" the film at the time, but hopes to make it in the future. "That's kind of my dream script," he said. "That's the one I wanna make and then I just wanna, like, go off into the sunset."

In 2016, he was reportedly developing a potential semi-sequel to One Crazy Summer with Bobcat Goldthwait, one of the film's original stars, but was unsure if Cusack and Demi Moore would return to reprise their roles.

== Filmography ==
Films

- Better Off Dead (1985)
- One Crazy Summer (1986)
- How I Got into College (1989)
- The Last Halloween (1991)
- The Incredible Crash Dummies (1993) (writer only)
- Safety Patrol (1998)
- Stuck in the Suburbs (2004)
- Shredderman Rules (2007)
- Legally Blondes (2009)
- Ratko: The Dictator's Son (2009)
- A Fairly Odd Movie: Grow Up, Timmy Turner! (2011)
- Big Time Movie (2012)
- A Fairly Odd Christmas (2012)
- A Fairly Odd Summer (2014)
- Santa Hunters (2014)
- Rufus (2016)
- Rufus 2 (2017)
- Malibu Rescue: The Movie (2019)
- Malibu Rescue: The Next Wave (2020)

Television series

- Press Your Luck (1983–1986) (designer and animator of the "Whammy", all episodes)
- Saturday Night Live (1988–1990) (assistant director for two seasons)
- The New Adventures of Beans Baxter (1987–1988) (wrote and directed most episodes)
- Encyclopedia Brown (1989–1990) (director)
- Bill & Ted's Excellent Adventures (1990–1991) (writer)
- Eek! the Cat (1992–1998) (co-creator, executive producer, and wrote most of the episodes)
  - The Terrible Thunderlizards (1993–1997) (co-creator, executive producer, writer)
  - Klutter! (1995–1996) (co-creator, executive producer, writer, voice actor)
- The Puzzle Place (1994–1998) (directed 2 episodes)
- V.I.P. (1998–2002) (directed many episodes)
- Honey, I Shrunk the Kids: The TV Show (1997–1998) (directed 3 episodes)
- Sabrina: The Animated Series (1999) (creator, developer, casting director, voice director and executive producer)
- Even Stevens (2000–2002) (directed 3 episodes)
- Lizzie McGuire (2001–2003) (directed 9 episodes)
- Phil of the Future (2004) (directed 4 episodes)
- Unfabulous (2005–2007) (directed 7 episodes)
- Zoey 101 (2005–2007) (directed 5 episodes)
- Ned's Declassified School Survival Guide (2005–2007) (directed 11 episodes, 1 of them the one-hour series finale)
- Zeke and Luther (2009–2011) (directed 11 episodes)
- Big Time Rush (2009–2013) (directed 20 episodes, 5 of them being 2-part specials)
- Kirby Buckets (2014–2017) (directed 6 episodes)
- School of Rock (2016) (directed 1 episode)
- Bizaardvark (2016) (directed 3 episodes)
- Malibu Rescue (2019) (creator)
